= List of shoegaze bands =

The following is a list of notable shoegaze bands and musicians.

== Artists ==
- Adorable
- Air Formation
- Airiel
- Alcest
- Alcian Blue
- Alison's Halo
- Alvvays
- Amesoeurs
- Apollo Heights
- Asobi Seksu
- Astreal
- Astrobrite
- Autolux
- The Autumns
- The Away Days
- Bardo Pond
- Beach Fossils
- Beach House
- Benoit Pioulard
- Bipolar Explorer
- The Black Ryder
- Bleach
- Blind Mr. Jones
- Blonde Redhead
- The Boo Radleys
- Boris
- Bowery Electric
- Braids
- The Brian Jonestown Massacre
- The Brother Kite
- Butterfly Explosion
- Candy Claws
- Catherine Wheel
- Chapterhouse
- Cheatahs
- Clarion
- Cloakroom
- Coaltar of the Deepers
- Cocteau Twins
- Cranes
- The Curtain Society
- Curve
- The Dandy Warhols
- Daughter
- Deerhunter
- Deftones
- DIIV
- Drop Nineteens
- Dust Moth
- Echo Lake
- Engineers
- Th' Faith Healers
- The Fauns
- Feeble Little Horse
- Film School
- Fleshwater
- Flower Flower
- Flying Saucer Attack
- For Tracy Hyde
- Glare
- Glitterer
- Hatchie
- Have a Nice Life
- Her New Knife
- The High Violets
- The Horrors
- Hot Zex
- Hotline TNT
- Hum
- Hundredth
- I Break Horses
- Io Echo
- Jane Remover
- Julie
- Jesu
- The Jesus and Mary Chain
- Kill Hannah
- Kinoko Teikoku
- Kitchens of Distinction
- Knifeplay
- Kraus
- Kyte
- Letting Up Despite Great Faults
- Lilys
- Loathe
- Loop
- Lost Velvet
- Lovesliescrushing
- LSD and the Search for God
- Lulabox
- Lush
- M83
- Mahogany
- Maps
- Mazzy Star
- Medicine
- Mercury Rev
- Moodring
- Moose
- Moving Panoramas
- My Bloody Valentine
- My Vitriol
- Narrow Head
- No Joy
- Nothing
- Oversize
- Ovlov
- Pale Saints
- Palm Ghosts
- Parannoul
- Parting Gift
- Pinkshinyultrablast
- Pity Sex
- A Place to Bury Strangers
- Quannnic
- The Radio Dept.
- Ratbag
- Rev Rev Rev
- Ride
- Ringo Deathstarr
- Ulrich Schnauss
- School of Seven Bells
- Secret Shine
- Seefeel
- She's Green
- Sianspheric
- Silversun Pickups
- Shin Hae Gyeong
- A Shoreline Dream
- Sleep Party People
- Slow Crush
- Slowdive
- Smush
- Soda Stereo
- Softcult
- Soundpool
- The Spirit of the Beehive
- Spiritualized
- Spotlight Kid
- Spunsugar
- Starflyer 59
- A Sunny Day in Glasgow
- Superheaven
- Sweet Jesus
- Sweet Trip
- Swervedriver
- Swim Deep
- Swirlies
- Tanukichan
- Tape Deck Mountain
- The Telescopes
- Temple of Angels
- Terraplana
- They Are Gutting a Body of Water
- Tokyo Shoegazer
- True Widow
- Trust Company
- The Twilight Sad
- Universe Nekoko
- Vaadat Charigim
- Van She
- The Veldt
- The Verve
- Vision Eternel
- Wednesday
- Whirr
- Whitelands
- Wild Nothing
- Windy and Carl
- Wisp
- Yves Tumor
- Zzzaam

== See also ==
- List of dream pop artists
- List of post-rock bands
- List of neo-psychedelia artists
- List of noise rock bands
- List of ambient music artists
- List of mainstream rock performers
