= List of dream pop artists =

This is a list of dream pop artists. Individuals are alphabetized by their surname.

== A–M ==
- Air
- All About Eve
- Alvvays
- A.R. Kane
- Atlas Sound
- Au Revoir Simone
- The Autumns
- Azure Ray
- Basement Revolver
- Bat for Lashes
- Beach Fossils
- Beach House
- Bell Hollow
- Belly
- Blonde Redhead
- The Boo Radleys
- Braids
- Broadcast
- Candidate
- Candy Claws
- Catherine Wheel
- Chapterhouse
- Chromatics
- Cigarettes After Sex
- Cocteau Twins
- Cranes
- Julee Cruise
- Crumb
- Cults
- Curve
- The Depreciation Guild
- Devics
- DIIV
- Dina Ögon
- Echo Lake
- Elysian Fields
- Engineers
- Eskobar
- Ethel Cain
- Fear of Men
- Field Mouse
- Fishmans
- For Against
- For Tracy Hyde
- Galaxie 500
- Kenneth James Gibson
- Girl in Red
- Grimes
- Hatchie
- Her's
- High Highs
- The High Violets
- The Hundred in the Hands
- I Break Horses
- The Innocence Mission
- It Hugs Back
- Japanese Breakfast
- Jay Som
- Jadu
- jj
- The Joy Formidable
- Julee Cruise
- Kitchens of Distinction
- Lab Partners
- Landing
- Lana Del Rey
- Letting Up Despite Great Faults
- Lykke Li
- Little Dragon
- London Grammar
- Lorde
- Lost Velvet
- Lovesliescrushing
- Lower Dens
- Lush
- M83
- Magic Wands
- Mahogany
- Mazzy Star
- Medicine
- Men I Trust
- Mira
- Mr Twin Sister
- My Bloody Valentine

== N–Z ==
- New Constellations
- The Nightblooms
- The Ocean Blue
- The One AM Radio
- Pale Saints
- Palm Ghosts
- Papercuts
- Parannoul
- Parekh & Singh
- Parker and Lily
- Plastic Flowers
- Porcelain Raft
- Purity Ring
- The Radio Dept.
- The Raveonettes
- Ride
- Sarah P.
- Alexandra Savior
- Say Lou Lou
- School of Seven Bells
- Secret Shine
- Seely
- Sigur Rós
- Troye Sivan
- Slowdive
- Snakadaktal
- Snow & Voices
- Soundpool
- Spirea X
- Spotlight Kid
- SRSQ
- Still Corners
- Stripmall Architecture
- Sugar Plant
- The Sundays
- Sweet Trip
- Tanukichan
- The Telescopes
- Them Are Us Too
- This Empty Flow
- This Mortal Coil
- Trance to the Sun
- Turnover
- Vansire
- Venus Hum
- Vision Eternel
- Vivian Girls
- Warpaint
- Washed Out
- Wet
- White Violet
- Wild Nothing
- Wolf Alice
- The xx
- Your Friend
- The Zephyrs

== See also ==
- List of shoegaze bands
