= List of alternative rock artists =

This is a list of alternative rock artists. Bands are listed alphabetically by the first letter in their name (not including "The"), and individuals are listed by the first name.

== 0–9 ==
- +44
- 3 Doors Down
- 4 Non Blondes
- 8stops7
- 10 Years
- 12 Stones
- 13 Engines
- 54-40
- The 77s
- 311
- The 1975
- 10,000 Maniacs

== A ==
- A
- A-ha
- A Day to Remember
- A Perfect Circle
- A Rocket to the Moon
- A Silent Film
- Aaroh
- Abandon Kansas
- Abandoned Pools
- The Academy Is...
- Acceptance
- Acid Bath
- Acroma
- Adam Again
- Adam Gontier
- Adema
- Adorable
- The Afghan Whigs
- AFI
- After Midnight Project
- Against Me!
- Against the Current
- Age of Chance
- Air
- Alanis Morissette
- The Alarm
- Alex Clare
- Alexandros
- Alice in Chains
- Alien Ant Farm
- Alkaline Trio
- The All-American Rejects
- All Time Low
- The Almost
- Alpha Rev
- Alt-J
- Alter Bridge
- American Authors
- American Hi-Fi
- American Standards
- The Amps
- Amplifier
- Anathema
- Anberlin
- Andy Biersack
- Angels & Airwaves
- APB
- The Apex Theory
- Arcade Fire
- Arcane Roots
- Architecture in Helsinki
- Arctic Monkeys
- Area 11
- Arkells
- Armor for Sleep
- ArmsBendBack
- Art of Anarchy
- As Everything Unfolds
- As Tall As Lions
- Ash
- Asian Kung-Fu Generation
- At the Drive-In
- The Ataris
- Athlete
- Atlas Genius
- Atom Smash
- Audioslave
- The Auteurs
- Autolux
- Avenged Sevenfold
- Avril Lavigne
- Awolnation

== B ==
- B-52s
- Babes in Toyland
- Baby Chaos
- The Backseat Lovers
- Bad Books
- Bad Suns
- Badflower
- Balance and Composure
- Band of Horses
- Barenaked Ladies
- Baryonyx
- Bastille
- Battles
- Bayside
- Be Your Own Pet
- Beady Eye
- Beastie Boys
- Beatsteaks
- Beck
- Beirut
- Belly
- Ben Folds Five
- Ben Kweller
- Beth Orton
- Better Than Ezra
- Betzefer
- Beware of Darkness
- Biffy Clyro
- Big Black
- Big Dipper
- Big Wreck
- The Big Pink
- Billy Corgan
- Billy Talent
- Birds of Tokyo
- Björk
- Blackfield
- Black Kids
- Black Light Burns
- Black Rebel Motorcycle Club
- Bleachers
- Bleech 9:3
- Blind Melon
- Blind Pilot
- Blindside
- Blink-182
- Bloc Party
- Blonde Redhead
- Blood Red Shoes
- Bloodhound Gang
- Blue October
- Blumfeld
- Blues Traveler
- Blur
- Bôa
- Bob Mould
- Bodyjar
- Bon Iver
- Bowling For Soup
- Boys Like Girls
- Bracket
- Brand New
- Brandon Flowers
- Breaking Benjamin
- The Breeders
- Bring Me the Horizon
- Broder Daniel
- The Brobecks
- Buck-Tick
- The Buck Pets
- Buffalo Tom
- Bully
- Bush
- Butthole Surfers

== C ==
- The Cab
- Cage the Elephant
- Cake
- The Calling
- Camper Van Beethoven
- Candlebox
- Canterbury
- Carbon Leaf
- Cartel
- Carter the Unstoppable Sex Machine
- Catatonia
- Catherine
- Catherine Wheel
- Cave In
- The Charlatans
- Chevelle
- Chris Cornell
- Chronic Future
- Chumbawamba
- The Church
- Circa Survive
- Citizen Cope
- Civil Twilight
- CKY
- The Classic Crime
- Cog
- Coheed and Cambria
- Cold
- Cold Beat
- Cold War Kids
- Coldplay
- Collective Soul
- Concrete Blonde
- The Connells
- Consolidated
- The Constellations
- The Cooper Temple Clause
- Copeland
- Counting Crows
- The Cranberries
- Crash Karma
- Crash Test Dummies
- Crazy Town
- Creed
- Crossfade
- Cui Jian
- The Cure
- Curve
- Cyclefly

== D ==
- The Dandy Warhols
- Dark New Day
- Daron Malakian and Scars on Broadway
- Das Damen
- Dashboard Confessional
- Dave Matthews Band
- Dave Navarro
- Days of the New
- Deacon Blue
- Dead by Sunrise
- Dead Letter Circus
- Dead Poetic
- Dead Sara
- Deaf Havana
- Deep Blue Something
- Default
- Deerhoof
- Deftones
- Delaire the Liar
- Demon Hunter
- Depeche Mode
- Desaparecidos
- Dig
- Dinosaur Jr.
- Dir En Grey
- Dishwalla
- doubleDrive
- Dredg
- Drill
- Duran Duran
- Dutch Uncles

== E ==
- Eagle-Eye Cherry
- The Early November
- Econoline Crush
- Eddie Vedder
- Editors
- Eels
- Eisley
- Elbow
- Electrasy
- Eleventh Dream Day
- The Elms
- Elvis Costello
- Embodyment
- Emery
- Emil Bulls
- Enter Shikari
- Envy on the Coast
- Eraserheads
- Evanescence
- Evans Blue
- Eve's Plum
- Eve 6
- Everclear
- Everything Everything
- The Exies
- The Exit

== F ==
- Failure
- Faith No More
- The Fall
- Fall Out Boy
- Falling in Reverse
- Far-Less
- Fastball
- Fatboy Slim
- Fatherson
- Feeder
- Feist
- Felt
- Fiction Plane
- Fightstar
- Filter
- Finch
- Finger Eleven
- Fiona Apple
- Fishbone
- Five for Fighting
- The Flaming Lips
- Fleshwater
- Foo Fighters
- The Format
- Forty Foot Echo
- Fountains of Wayne
- Franz Ferdinand
- The Fray
- Freeze the Atlantic
- Fuel
- Fugazi
- Fun Lovin Criminals
- Funeral For A Friend
- Further Seems Forever
- Future Palace

== G ==
- The Gandharvas
- Garbage
- The Get Up Kids
- Gin Blossoms
- Glassjaw
- Glasvegas
- Gnarls Barkley
- Godsmack
- The Golden Palominos
- Gomez
- Goo Goo Dolls
- Good Charlotte
- Gorillaz
- Go Sailor
- Gotye
- Grant Lee Buffalo
- The Grapes of Wrath
- Grayscale
- Grass Widow
- Greek Fire
- Green Apple Quick Step
- Green Day
- Guano Apes
- The Gufs
- Guided by Voices
- Gumball
- Guster

== H ==
- Half Moon Run
- Halestorm
- HalfNoise
- Happy Mondays
- Hawksley Workman
- Hawthorne Heights
- Headstones
- Headswim
- Helium
- Helmet
- Hey Violet
- HIM
- Hindsights
- The Hives
- Holding Absence
- Hole
- Hoobastank
- Hootie & The Blowfish
- Hopesfall
- Hot Hot Heat
- Hum
- Hundred Reasons
- Hurt
- Hüsker Dü

== I ==
- I Dont Know How but They Found Me
- I Love You But I've Chosen Darkness
- I Mother Earth
- The Icarus Line
- Idlewild
- Ima Robot
- Imogen Heap
- Incubus
- Injected
- The Innocence Mission
- Inspiral Carpets
- Institute
- Interpol
- Island of Love
- Ivoryline

== J ==
- Jack White
- Jack's Mannequin
- Jaguares
- James
- James Iha
- Jane Air
- Jane's Addiction
- Jars of Clay
- Jeff Buckley
- Jejune
- Jellyfish
- Jerry Cantrell
- The Jesus and Mary Chain
- Jesus Jones
- The Jesus Lizard
- Jet
- Jimmie's Chicken Shack
- Jimmy Eat World
- Jitters
- John Butler Trio
- Joywave
- The Joy Formidable
- The JudyBats
- Julian Cope
- Juliana Hatfield
- The Juliana Theory
- July Talk
- Jump, Little Children

== K ==
- K's Choice
- Kagoule
- Kaiser Chiefs
- Kaizers Orchestra
- Kaleo
- Kane
- Kara's Flowers
- Karnivool
- Kasabian
- Katatonia
- Keane
- KennyHoopla
- Kent
- Kevin Devine
- Kill Hannah
- The Killers
- The Kills
- King Charles
- Kings Kaleidoscope
- Kings of Leon
- Kitchens of Distinction
- Kisschasy
- Klaxons
- KMFDM
- Kodaline
- Kongos
- The Kooks
- Korn
- Kula Shaker
- Kutless

== L ==
- The La's
- Lacuna Coil
- LANY
- L'Arc-en-Ciel
- Jasper Leach
- The Lemonheads
- Lemon Demon
- Less Than Jake
- Letters to Cleo
- Life of Agony
- Lifehouse
- Limblifter
- Limp Bizkit
- Linkin Park
- Lit
- Live
- The Living Tombstone
- Liz Phair
- Local H
- Lord Huron
- Lostprophets
- Love Battery
- Lovedrug
- Lower Than Atlantis
- The Lowest of the Low
- Lucero
- Ludo
- Luscious Jackson

== M ==
- Mad Season
- Madrugada
- Mae
- The Maine
- Major Moment
- Mallory Knox
- Manchester Orchestra
- Mando Diao
- Måneskin
- Manic Street Preachers
- Mansun
- Marcy Playground
- Marilyn Manson
- Marlene Kuntz
- Marvelous 3
- Mary's Danish
- Matchbox Twenty
- The Matches
- Material Issue
- Matthew Good
- Matthew Sweet
- Maxïmo Park
- Mayday
- The Mayfield Four
- Mazzy Star
- The Mekons
- Melvins
- Metric
- MewithoutYou
- Middle Class Rut
- Midori
- The Mighty Lemon Drops
- Millencolin
- Mobile
- Moby
- Modest Mouse
- Moist
- Moke
- Tony Molina
- Monoral
- Morningwood
- Morphine
- Morrissey
- Mor ve Ötesi
- Moses Mayfield
- Moth
- Mother Love Bone
- Mother Mother
- Motion City Soundtrack
- Mudhoney
- Mudvayne
- Mumford & Sons
- Muse
- Mutemath
- My Chemical Romance
- My Midnight Creeps
- My Vitriol
- Myles Kennedy

== N ==
- N.E.R.D
- Nada Surf
- The Naked and Famous
- Natalie Merchant
- The National
- Needtobreathe
- The Neighbourhood
- Neon Trees
- Neutral Milk Hotel
- Neverending White Lights
- New Empire
- New Found Glory
- New Model Army
- New Order
- New Politics
- New Radicals
- Nick Cave and the Bad Seeds
- Nickel Creek
- Nickelback
- Nico Vega
- Nine Black Alps
- Nine Days
- Nine Inch Nails
- Nine Lashes
- Nirvana
- No Devotion
- No Doubt
- Noah
- Noel Gallagher's High Flying Birds
- Nothing But Thieves

== O ==
- O.A.R.
- Oasis
- The Ocean Blue
- Oceansize
- The Offspring
- Of Monsters and Men
- Of Montreal
- OK Go
- Oleander
- Olivia Rodrigo
- One OK Rock
- OneRepublic
- Orbit
- Orgy
- Ostava
- Our Lady Peace
- Ozma

== P ==
- P.O.D.
- Palaye Royale
- Pale Saints
- Palm Ghosts
- Panic! at the Disco
- Papa Roach
- Parabelle
- Paramore
- Paul Westerberg
- Paul Weller
- Pavement
- Pearl Jam
- Pete Yorn
- Phantom Planet
- Phoenix
- Phoxjaw
- Pierce the Veil
- The Pillows
- Pixies
- PJ Harvey
- Placebo
- Plain White T's
- Plastic Tree
- Pleymo
- Pluto
- Poets of the Fall
- Poor Old Lu
- Pop Evil
- Pop Will Eat Itself
- Porcupine Tree
- Porno for Pyros
- Portishead
- Portugal. The Man
- The Posies
- Possum Dixon
- The Postal Service
- Poster Children
- Powerman 5000
- The Presidents of the United States of America
- The Pretenders
- The Pretty Reckless
- Primal Scream
- Prime Circle
- Prime STH
- Primitive Radio Gods
- The Primitives
- Primus
- The Prodigy
- Project 86
- The Psychedelic Furs
- Public Image Ltd.
- Puscifer
- Puddle of Mudd
- Pulled Apart By Horses
- Pulp
- Punchline
- Puressence
- PVRIS
- Pylon

== Q ==
- Queenadreena
- Queens of the Stone Age
- Quietdrive

== R ==
- R.E.M.
- Ra
- Ra Ra Riot
- The Raconteurs
- Radiohead
- Radwimps
- Rage Against the Machine
- The Railway Children
- Rammstein
- The Rasmus
- The Raveonettes
- Red
- Red Hot Chili Peppers
- The Red Jumpsuit Apparatus
- Redd Kross
- Reef
- The Refreshments
- Regina Spektor
- Relient K
- Remy Zero
- The Rentals
- Renegade Soundwave
- The Replacements
- Republica
- Revis
- Rhythm Corps
- Rocket from the Crypt
- The Rocket Summer
- Royal Bliss
- Royal Blood
- The Rubens

== S ==
- SafetySuit
- Said the Whale
- Saint Asonia
- Saliva
- Sambomaster
- Saosin
- Saving Abel
- Say Anything
- School of Fish
- The Score
- Scott Stapp
- Scott Weiland
- Screaming Trees
- The Script
- The Seahorses
- Seaweed
- Sebadoh
- Seether
- Semisonic
- Serj Tankian
- Seven Mary Three
- Sevendust
- The Shamen
- Shawn Mullins
- Shed Seven
- Sheila on 7
- Sherwood
- Shihad
- Shinedown
- The Shins
- Shiny Toy Guns
- Shudder to Think
- Sick Puppies
- Silverchair
- Silverstein
- Silversun Pickups
- Simple Minds
- Simple Plan
- Sinéad O'Connor
- Siouxsie and the Banshees
- Sister Hazel
- Sixpence None the Richer
- Skillet
- Skindred
- Skunk Anansie
- Slaves On Dope
- Sleater-Kinney
- Sleeper Agent
- Sleeping with Sirens
- Sleigh Bells
- Sloan
- Slowdive
- Smash Mouth
- The Smashing Pumpkins
- The Smithereens
- The Smiths
- Snail Mail
- Snow Patrol
- Soccer Mommy
- Social Code
- Something Corporate
- Sonic Youth
- Sons of Elvis
- Sorry About Your Daughter
- Sort Sol
- Soul Asylum
- Soul Coughing
- Sound City Players
- Soundgarden
- Space
- Spacehog
- SPAN
- Sparta
- Spiderbait
- Spin Doctors
- Spirit of the West
- Sponge
- Spoon
- Squeeze
- St. Vincent
- Stabbing Westward
- Staind
- Starflyer 59
- Starsailor
- Starset
- State Radio
- Stereolab
- Stereophonics
- Steve Burns
- Steve Taylor
- Steve Taylor & The Perfect Foil
- Stir
- The Stone Roses
- Stone Sour
- Stone Temple Pilots
- Story of the Year
- The Stranglers
- Stroke 9
- The Strokes
- The Subways
- Sucioperro
- Suede
- Sugar
- Sugar Ray
- The Sugarcubes
- Sugarcult
- Sullen
- Sullivan
- Sum 41
- The Sundays
- Sunny Day Real Estate
- Sunrise Avenue
- Super Furry Animals
- Supercar
- Superdrag
- Supergrass
- Superheaven
- The Superjesus
- Surrounded
- Suzanne Vega
- Sweet Water
- Sweethead
- Swervedriver
- Switchfoot
- System of a Down

== T ==
- Takida
- Taking Back Sunday
- Talk Show
- Talk Talk
- Tame Impala
- Tantric
- Taproot
- The Tea Party
- Team Sleep
- Teenage Fanclub
- Tegan and Sara
- Temple of the Dog
- Terrible Things
- Texas
- That Dog
- The The
- Them Crooked Vultures
- Therapy?
- There for Tomorrow
- They Might Be Giants
- Thin White Rope
- Third Day
- Third Eye Blind
- Thirty Seconds to Mars
- Thom Yorke
- Thornhill
- Thornley
- Thousand Foot Krutch
- Three Days Grace
- Thrice
- Throwing Muses
- Thursday
- Tiger Please
- Toad the Wet Sprocket
- Toadies
- Tokio Hotel
- Tokyo Police Club
- Tomahawk
- Tom Morello
- Tom Waits
- Tonic
- Tonight Alive
- Tool
- Too Much Joy
- Tracy Bonham
- The Tragically Hip
- Train
- Transmatic
- Transvision Vamp
- Trapt
- Trashcan Sinatras
- Travis
- The Trews
- The Butterfly Effect
- Tripping Daisy
- Troy Baker
- TrustCompany
- TTNG
- TV on the Radio
- Tweaker
- Twenty One Pilots
- Twin Atlantic
- Two Door Cinema Club
- Type O Negative

== U ==
- U2
- Ubiquitous Synergy Seeker
- Ultra Vivid Scene
- Uncle Tupelo
- Under the Influence of Giants
- Underoath
- Uniklubi
- Unsane
- Unwritten Law
- Upsahl
- Urge Overkill
- Urgh!
- Us Amongst The Rest
- The Used

== V ==
- The Vaccines
- Vampire Weekend
- The Vaselines
- VAST
- Velvet Revolver
- Vendetta Red
- Verdena
- Veridia
- VersaEmerge
- Versus
- Vertical Horizon
- Veruca Salt
- The Verve
- The Verve Pipe
- VHS or Beta
- Vic Chestnutt
- The Vines
- Violent Change
- Violent Femmes
- Violent Soho
- Virgos Merlot
- The Voidz
- Volcano Suns
- The Von Bondies
- Vonray

== W ==
- Wakey Wakey
- Walk Off The Earth
- Walk the Moon
- Wallflower
- The Wallflowers
- Wallows
- Walt Mink
- The Wannadies
- Wargasm
- Warpaint
- The Watchmen
- Waterparks
- Wavves
- We Are Scientists
- We Are the Ocean
- We the Kings
- The Weakerthans
- Weathers
- The Wedding Present
- Ween
- Weezer
- Whale
- Wheatus
- White Lies
- The White Stripes
- White Town
- Wilco
- Will Haven
- Wintersleep
- Wolf Alice
- Wolf Parade
- The Wombats
- The Wonder Stuff
- The Working Title
- WZRD

== X ==
- X Ambassadors
- The Xcerts

== Y ==
- Yeah Yeah Yeahs
- Yellowcard
- Yo La Tengo
- You Am I
- You Me at Six
- Young Guns
- Young the Giant
- Yungblud

== Z ==
- Zebrahead
- Zoé
- The Zolas
- Zox
- The Zutons
- Zwan

== See also ==
- List of alternative metal artists
- List of Britpop musicians
- List of dream pop artists
- List of gothic rock bands
- List of indie pop artists
- List of indie rock musicians
- List of industrial rock bands
- List of math rock groups
- List of post-grunge bands
- List of post-punk revival bands
- List of post-rock bands
- List of shoegaze bands
- Lists of musicians
