= Özen =

Özen is a Turkish name, it may refer to:

- Ali Özen (born 1971), Turkish wrestler
- Eren Özen, Turkish footballer
- Gökhan Özen (born 1979), Turkish singer and songwriter
- Mahmut Özen (born 1988), Turkish footballer
- Önder Özen, footballer, coach, football club director
- Oğuz Can Özen, Turkish artist, member of the band The Away Days
- Sinan Özen (born 1964), Turkish singer, musician, songwriter, composer, actor and TV presenter
- Tülin Özen (born 1979), Turkish actress
- Önder Özen (born 1969), Turkish footballer

== See also ==
- Özen Dam, dam in Turkey
- Ozen (disambiguation)
