= Hotel Insomnia =

Studio album by For Tracy Hyde
- Released: December 14, 2022
- Genre: Shoegaze, dream pop, jangle pop
- Length: 56:53
- Label: P-Vine

For Tracy Hyde chronology
Ethernity (2021)	Hotel Insomnia (2022)

Professional ratings
Review scores
Source	Rating
Pitchfork	7.6/10

Hotel Insomnia is the fifth and final studio album by Japanese shoegaze band For Tracy Hyde, released on December 14, 2022, through P-Vine Records.

== Themes ==
The album was inspired by the unease and anxiety of living in a post-COVID world. The band cites shibuya-kei as a major influence on the album's sound.

== Release ==
The album was released on December 14, 2022. It was preceded by the singles "Subway Station Revelation" and "Milkshake". Milkshake was released as part of a split single with Thai shoegaze band Death of Heather. A tour was announced for the album, featuring three dates around Tokyo and Osaka, and a co-headline with Lovely Summer Chan. On January 5, 2023, it was announced that the band would break up on March 25, after the final show of the tour.

== Reception ==
Pitchfork featured the album on their "6 New Albums You Should Listen to Now" list. Joshua Kim of NPR praised the song "Undulate", saying that it "feels like we're being launched into space, leaving the stratosphere to find a new home among the stars."

== Track listing ==
Regular edition
No.	Title	Length
1.	"Undulate"	4:32
2.	"The First Time (Is The Last Time)"	4:31
3.	"Kodiak"	5:54
4.	"Lungs"	3:38
5.	"Estuary"	5:07
6.	"Bleachers"	2:12
7.	"Friends"	4:02
8.	"Natalie"	4:11
9.	"Sirens"	5:11
10.	"House of Mirrors"	5:03
11.	"Milkshake"	3:41
12.	"Subway Station Revelation"	4:14
13.	"Leave The Planet"	4:27
Total length:		56:53

== Chart positions ==
Chart (2022)	Peak position
Oricon Albums Chart	240
