= White violet =

White violet may refer to:

- Violets with white flowers, including:
  - Viola alba
  - Viola blanda
  - Viola renifolia
  - Viola canadensis
- White Violet (band)
- White Violet Center for Eco-Justice
