= Ozen =

Ozen may refer to:

- Özen, a Turkish surname, including a list of people with the name
- Barbara Lynn Ozen (born 1942), American musician
- Clifton J. Ozen High School, in Beaumont, Texas, U.S.
- Ozen, a fictional character in Made in Abyss
- Özen Dam, in Turkey
