= The Peggies =

Japanese rock band

- The Peggies in 2021. From left to right: Makiko, Miku, Yuho.

Background information
- Origin: Kawasaki, Kanagawa, Japan
- Genres: Alternative rock; pop rock
- Years active: 2011–2022 (Note: Indefinite hiatus)
- Labels: Poppo Express; Epic Records Japan
- Members: Yuuho Kitazawa; Makiko Ishiwata; Miku Onuki
- Past members: Maiko Nagasaka
- Website: thepeggies.jp

The Peggies (stylized as the peggies) was a Japanese rock band formed in Kawasaki, Kanagawa, in 2011. The band is signed with Poppo Express and is currently affiliated with Epic Records Japan. Their name originates from the female name Peggy.

On July 8, 2022, the band announced that they would be going on indefinite hiatus in September the same year, following the release of a best of compilation album MMY and final tour "the peggies tour 2022 My White".

== Members ==
- Yūho Kitazawa (北澤ゆうほ, Kitazawa Yūho) (born December 2, 1995; Tokyo, Japan) is the vocalist and the guitarist of the band, and is in charge of songwriting, composition, and arrangement of songs. Her band nickname is "Yuyūho".
  - In July 2024, Yuuho announced her first solo album and corresponding tour under the name of "Q.I.S." to be released in September.
- Makiko Ishiwata (石渡マキコ, Ishiwata Makiko) (born August 27, 1995; Tokyo, Japan) is the bassist of the band. Her band nickname is "Megamakiko".
- Miku Ōnuki (大貫みく, Ōnuki Miku) (born April 23, 1995; Kanagawa Prefecture, Japan) is the drummer of the band. Her band nickname is "Minimiku".

== Discography ==
=== Singles ===
	Release date	Title	Catalog No.	Tracklist	Remarks
1st	October 19, 2016	"スプートニク/LOVE TRIP" ("Sputnik/LOVE TRIP")	POCS-9153	5 songs: 1. "スプートニク" ("Sputnik"); 2. "LOVE TRIP"; 3. "LOVE in the TOKYO" (ぺぺぺぺ remix); 4. "青春なんかに泣かされて" (live 2016.7.28 at clubasia) ("Seishun Nanka Ni Nakasa Rete" (live 2016.7.28 at clubasia)); 5. "ときめきシンフォニー" (live 2016.7.28 at clubasia) ("Tokimeki Symphony" (live 2016.7.28 at clubasia))	Limited Edition
2nd	May 10, 2017	"ドリーミージャーニー" ("Dreamy Journey")	ESCL-4844 (Limited Edition); ESCL-4846 (Regular Edition)	2 songs: 1. "ドリーミージャーニー" ("Dreamy Journey"); 2. "ちゅるりらサマフィッシュ" ("Chururirama Fish")	Aired on TV Tokyo's Boruto: Naruto Next Generations as an ending theme. It is a limited edition with a DVD and a recording of MV's "Dreamy Journey".
3rd	September 6, 2017	"BABY!"	ESCL-4907, 4908 (Limited Edition); ESCL-4909 (Regular Edition)	2 songs: 1. "BABY!"; 2. "ずっと" ("Zutto")	Its release comes in a form of limited edition with the recording of MV's "BABY!". Also an insert song in Rascal Does Not Dream of Bunny Girl Senpai, covered by cast members Maaya Uchida and Sora Amamiya.
4th	November 22, 2017	"I 御中～文房具屋さんにあった試し書きだけで歌を作ってみました。～ " ("I Onchu - Bunbouguyasanni Attata Tameshigakidakede Uta O Tukuttemimashita～")	ESXX-1744	1 song: 1. "I 御中 ～文房具屋さんにあった試し書きだけで歌をつくってみました。～" ("I Onchū ~ Bunbōguyasan ni Atta Tameshi-gaki Dake de Uta o Tsukutte Mimashita.~")	Won the 2018 Good Design Award (Japan)
5th	November 7, 2018	"君のせい" ("Kimi No Sei")	ESCL-5120, 5121 (Limited Edition); ESCL-5119 (Regular Edition)	2 songs: 1. "君のせい" ("Kimi no Sei"); 2. "最終バスと砂時計" ("Saishū Basu to Sunadokei")	Opening theme for Rascal Does Not Dream of Bunny Girl Senpai
6th	May 29, 2019	"スタンドバイミー" ("Stand by Me")	ESCL-5245, 5246 (Limited Edition); ESCL-5244 (Regular Edition)	2 songs: 1. "スタンドバイミー" ("Stand by Me"); 2. "DIVE TO LOVE"	Ending theme for Sarazanmai
7th	August 26, 2020	"センチメートル" ("Centimeter")		1 song: 1. "センチメートル" ("Centimeter"); 2. "花火" ("Hanabi"); 3. "君のせい" ("Kimi no Sei"(Live ver.))	Opening theme for Rent-A-Girlfriend
8th	March 28, 2021	"足跡" ("Footprints")		1 song: 1. 足跡" ("Footprints"); 2. "Unleash"	Ending theme for My Hero Academia (season 5)
9th	March 31, 2022	"ハイライト・ハイライト" ("Highlight Highlight")		1 song: 1. "ハイライト・ハイライト" ("Highlight Highlight")	Opening theme for In the Heart of Kunoichi Tsubaki

=== Extended plays ===
	Release date	Title	Catalog No.	Tracklist	Remarks
1st	May 27, 2015	PPEP1	DDCZ-2030	5 songs: 1. JAM; 2. どきどきレボリューション (Dokidoki Revolution); 3. カウンター! (Counter!); 4. 僕らの戦争 (Bokura no sensō); 5. ヘルズ (Hells)	
2nd	January 24, 2018	super boy ! super girl!!	ESCL-4956	6 songs: 1. GLORY; 2. ネバーランド (Neverland); 3. 恋の呪い (Koi no Noroi); 4. 遠距離恋愛 (Enkyori Ren'ai); 5. ハートビート (Heartbeat); 6. I 御中 ～文房具屋さんにあった試し書きだけで歌をつくってみました。～ (I Onchū ~ Bunbōguyasan ni Atta Tameshi-gaki Dake de Uta o Tsukutte Mimashita.~)	
3rd	July 5, 2019	なつめきサマーEP (Natsumeki Summer EP)	ESCL-4956	4 songs: 1. サマラブ超特急 (Samarabu Chō Tokkyū); 2. かみさま (Kami-sama); 3. ボーイミーツガール (Boy meets Girl); 4. ちゅるりらサマフィッシュ～ラブリーサマーちゃんRemix～ (Chururirama Fish ~Lovely Summer Chan Remix~)	
4th	April 8, 2020	アネモネーEP (Anemone EP)	ESCL-5382	4 songs: 1. アネモネ(Anemone); 2. 青すぎる空 (Aosugiru Sora); 3. weekend 4. ロンリー (Lonely); 5. いきてる -弾き語り (Ikiteru -Hikigatari)	

=== Albums ===
	Release date	Title	Catalog No.	Tracklist	Remarks
1st	November 19, 2014	goodmorning in TOKYO	DDCZ-9039	8 songs: 1. アイラブユー (I Love You); 2. MOTTO; 3. ボーイミーツガール (Boy Meets Girl); 4. ATOM; 5. 金曜日の夜 (Kin'yōbi no Yoru); 6. メロディメーカー (Melody Maker); 7. 人形のやつ (Ningyō no Yatsu); 8. goodmorning in TOKYO	
2nd	November 11, 2015	NEW KINGDOM	DDCZ-2061	9 songs: 1. グライダー (Glider); 2. 青春なんかに泣かされて (Seishun Nanka ni Nakasa Rete); 3. LOVE in the TOKYO; 4. ブリキ (Buriki); 5. 花 (Hana); 6. いきてる (Ikiteru); 7. 深海 (Shinkai); 8. ときめき♡シンフォニー (Tokimeki ♡ Symphony); 9. P/F	
3rd	February 6, 2019	Hell like Heaven	ESCL-5164-5 (Limited Edition); ESCL-5166 (Regular Edition)	12 songs: 1. 君のせい (Kimi no Sei); 2. する (Suru); 3. マイクロフォン (Microphone); 4. ドリーミージャーニー (Dreamy Journey); 5. はちみつ (Hachimitsu); 6. そうだ、僕らは (Sōda, Bokurawa); 7. かみさま (Kami-sama); 8. BABY!; 9. Fortune; 10. サマラブ超特急 (Samarabu Chō Tokkyū); 11. LOVE TRIP; 12. 明日 (Ashita)	
4th	October 20, 2021	The GARDEN	ESCL-5564-5 (Limited Edition); ESCL-5566 (Regular Edition)	10 songs: 1. センチメートル (Centimeter); 2. ドラマチック (Dramatic); 3. スタンドバイミー (Stand By Me); 4. Hello Sugar; 5. ドア (Door); 6. Contrast; 7. 足跡 (Ashiato); 8. アネモネ (Anemone); 9. スプートニク(2021) (Sputnik (2021)); 10. TAIKIKEN	

== Tours ==
=== Solo live ===
	schedule	title	venue
1st	December 4, 2014	the peggies presents "declaration of war vol.1"	tokyo / shibuya www
2nd	March 23, 2015	the peggies presents "declaration of war vol.2"	tokyo shindaita fever
3rd	July 3, 2015	the peggies presents "declaration of war vol.3"	tokyo / shinjuku mars
4th	December 10, 2015	the peggies presents ONEMAN LIVE "Declaration of War vol.4"	Tokyo / Shibuya WWW
5th	July 28, 2016	Declaration of War vol.5 ~ Peggies Midsummer Victory Declaration !!! ~	Tokyo clubasia
6th	December 2, 2016	Declaration of War Vol.6 ~ The day Yuho was born ~	Osaka / Abeno Rock Town
7th	December 8, 2016	Declaration of War final (Christmas coming soon) -Pray for Miku, love for Makiko, sushi for Yuho !!-	Shibuya CLUB QUATTRO, Tokyo
8th	September 15, 2017	Dub Dab de Baby Baby	Tokyo / Shibuya WWW
9th	November 22, 2017	the peggies One-man Nagoya edition ~ Dera Peggies ~	Nagoya CLUB UPSET
10th	November 23, 2017	the peggies One-man Osaka edition that can't be carried -It's really peggies-	Osaka, Shangri-La
11th	April 23, 2018	Tobidase Pegi-chan Man! Onuki Miku Women's College Graduation Commemorative Live; ~ Looking for My Miku ~	Shimokitazawa, Tokyo CLUB251
12th	August 27, 2018	Tobidase Pegi-chan Man! ～ Born in the ME.GA.MAKIKO ～	Shimokitazawa SHELTER, Tokyo

=== Live Tour ===
Schedule
Title
Details
1st
June 3, 2017 – June 17, 2017
the peggies Dreamy Journey Tour 2017
~ Wild Peggies Appeared !!! ~

Performance date / venue (6 performances in 6 locations)

Performance date	City name	Venue
June 3	Sendai	LIVE HOUSE enn 3rd
June 7	Hiroshima	CAVE-BE
June 8	Fukuoka	Quebilck
June 10	Osaka	JANUS
June 11	Nagoya	JAMMIN'
June 17	Tokyo	Ebisu LIQUIDROOM

Remarks

- Held after the release of "Dreamy Journey".
  My first national tour.
2nd
February 21, 2018 – March 25, 2018
the peggies super boy! Super girl !! tour 2018
~ SUPERMARKET TRIP !!! ~

Performance date / venue (10 performances in 10 locations)

Performance date	City name	Venue
February 21	Takamatsu	DIME
February 23	Fukuoka	Drum Be-1
March 4	Sapporo	COLONY
March 9	Niigata	CLUB RIVERST
March 10	Sendai	enn 2nd
March 14	Kanazawa	vanvan V4
March 17	Nagoya	Nagoya CLUB QUATTRO
March 18	Osaka	Umeda CLUB QUATTRO
March 25	Tokyo	My Navi BLITZ Akasaka
