= You Be My Heart =

Compilation album for charity by Various
- Released: December 9, 2013
- Genre: Alternative rock, indie pop, indie rock
- Length: 63:39
- Language: English
- Label: Devon Reed
- Producer: Devon Reed

Professional ratings
Review scores
Source	Rating
IndieLondon	4/5 stars

You Be My Heart is a benefit album for 826 Valencia.

== Track listing ==
No.	Title	Performer(s)	Length
1.	"You Be My Heart"	Becky Stark	3:24
2.	"Prove Myself"	Horse Feathers	3:14
3.	"Seven Wonders"	Bowerbirds	2:57
4.	"Christen My Ship"	Fruit Bats	3:44
5.	"Half as Much"	Marissa Nadler	4:44
6.	"Made-Up Lines"	Ghost & Gale	3:02
7.	"While It All Away"	Danielle Ate the Sandwich	2:14
8.	"Melt This Heart of Mine"	Marble Sounds	3:29
9.	"Somewhere Feet Have Never Tread"	Letting Up Despite Great Faults	3:44
10.	"Mrs. Marquis de Sade"	The Cloud Room	3:49
11.	"Excuse Me"	The Spinto Band	2:34
12.	"She's Like a Hologram"	Maps & Atlases	4:29
13.	"I Know"	Mark Kozelek	4:29
14.	"The Reconciliation Song"	The Finches	4:01
15.	"More Than Just One Lifetime"	Key Losers	3:37
16.	"Consider My Chariot"	Field Report	5:11
17.	"You Gave Me a Reason"	Saturday Looks Good to Me	4:57
