= Bipolar Explorer =

American experimental dreampop trio

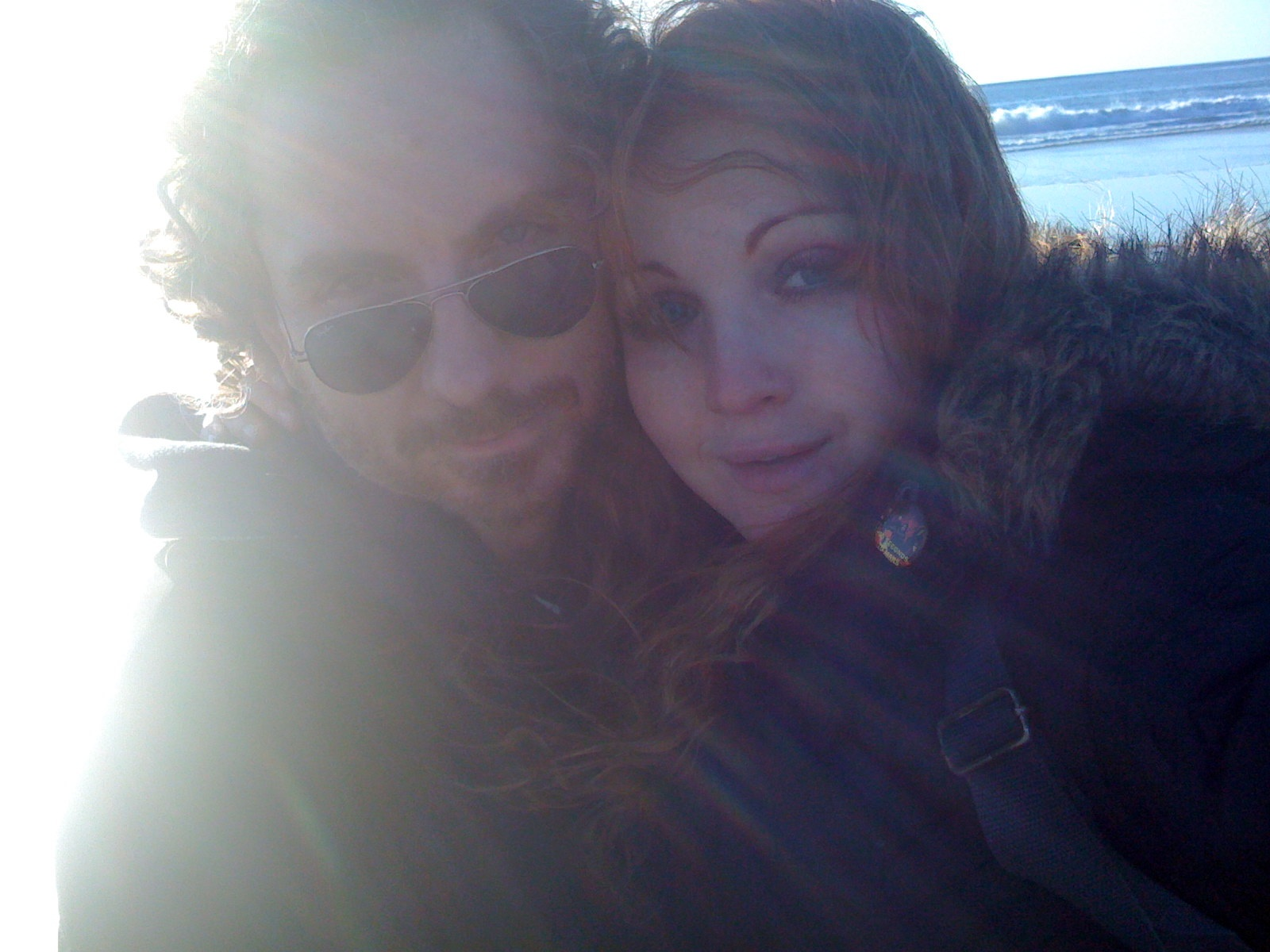
- Summer and Michael, cofounders of indie band Bipolar Explorer

Background information
- Origin: New York City, United States
- Genres: Dreampop, Shoegaze, Experimental music, Post-Rock, Ambient music, Electroacoustic music
- Years active: 2008–present
- Label: Slugg Records
- Members: Summer Serafin (deceased); Michael Serafin-Wells; Sylvia Solanas
- Website: bipolarexplorer.info

Bipolar Explorer is an American dreampop band from New York City. Formed in its present state and genre by band co-founders Summer Serafin (vocals, spoken word) and Michael Serafin-Wells (guitars, bass guitar, percussion, vocals, spoken word), the group has released thirteen albums and eight singles on Slugg Records beginning with 2012's double-album "Of Love and Loss". The band became a trio with the addition of French spoken word artist Sylvia Solanas in 2018.

== Formation and Of Love and Loss ==
After an initial indie rock release – Go Negative (2005, Slugg Records) featuring former Uncle bandmates Michael Serafin-Wells (songwriter, guitars, bass guitar, vocals) and Yves Gerard (drums, backing vocals) – Bipolar Explorer changed direction and personnel, re-configuring under the influence of co-founder and vocalist Summer Serafin.

Debuting the new sound in live performance at New York's Cooper Square Hotel, PopMatters described the band as "eclectic, powerful and steadfast" and the group began work on an EP recording for Slugg Records in Brooklyn.

Before it could be completed, on March 18, 2011, Ms. Serafin died after an accident. She was 31.

Many months later, armed with newly written songs post-tragedy, Serafin-Wells and the band returned to those recordings and in October 2012 released a double-album about Ms. Serafin. Entitled Of Love and Loss, Ground Control Magazine's Daryl Darko Barnett pronounced it "the most significantly stirring and addictive musical accomplishment we’ve come across in some time", naming it to their Critics Poll of Best Albums of the Year.

== Angels and BPXmas ==
At the end of 2014, the band released two albums in quick succession, a holiday one BPXmas on December 3, 2014, and Of Love and Loss’s follow-up, Angels on New Year's Day 2015.

Both critically acclaimed, NPR’s "On Being" noted the band's reworking holiday classics in their signature dream pop style and both albums began rotation on WFMU, notably finding favor with the station's legendary deejay Irene Trudel who called their sound "great, beautiful drifty-pop".

Ground Control's Daryl Darko Barnett wrote a feature about the former "Bipolar Explorer Work a Double-Shift Through the Holidays" and ended 2015 by naming Angels to his number one spot in the magazine's Best Albums of the Year round up, calling it "electrifying -what music fueled by raw love and emotions sounds like".

== Electric Hymnal ==
In June 2016, the band released their fifth album, a collection of devotional songs and spoken word, both sacred and secular, described as "a sonic prayer" for their fallen bandmate, Ms. Serafin. Their first foray into the use of spoken word as a component of their sound, Serafin-Wells would return to its use, composing narrative poetry for a female voice and underscoring it with ambient, post-rock guitars in subsequent releases. Again, Ground Control hailed the work "...Get ready to be swept up and away by a prayerful reverie of melodies. Listening, I began to feel like I was flying. Don't forget that Bipolar Explorer is a post-rock band. Low growling vocals, gnarly grinding tempos, rhythmic looping strands that escape and rise above the weight of this world, where angels and the living mingle..."

Featuring album art by American artist Michael Creese, Electric Hymnal was released as a limited-edition CD only (no digital) and given away by the band to fans upon request as "a gift of faith".

== Dream Together ==
On New Year's Day 2017, the band released their sixth album, Dream Together. WFMU’s Liz Berg featuring tracks on her show called it "just a great record". Again, WFMU’s Irene Trudel, praising it as "beautiful, full of sadness and wonder". The album made its way onto the charts of California's free-form KDVS, as well, starting as the station's No. 4 New Add the first week of January and rising to No. 18 overall in the weeks after.

Reaching Europe, the album was praised by France's Indiemusic as "Magical and majestic – an ultimate tour-de-force".

On February 20, 2017, the magazine's associate editor, Raphael Duprez, followed up with an interview with Michael. In answer to a question about how he and the band continue in light of the tragic events of 2011 he replied, "All of this is entirely for her. I often say that our music, each album, is of, for and about her. It's my way of telling people about her and talking to her myself. That's the "for’ and "about" parts of the equation. And Summer remains an integral part of the band – not only as its inspiration but, because I have lots of her isolated vocals from other recording sessions – as her voice, both spoken and singing, graces each record. I'll write songs and fly in her voice. Summer isn't the main reason BPX goes on, she's the only reason. She is the reason. And I think I can trust that I'm doing things for the right reason if I always know the reason for it is her. Not out of any ambition other than to honor and conjure her. She's my conscience."

== Sometimes in Dreams ==
On New Year's Day 2018, the band released their seventh album, a double-album, called Sometimes in Dreams. Surface Noise's Joe McGasko called it "Epic and affecting", the new album again found its way quickly onto playlists at WFMU, notably both Irene Trudel and Gaylord Field's shows, on Tuesday and Sunday nights, respectively.

On January 2, France's Indiemusic called the new album "Unforgettable and essential. Have no doubt, this is a major record."

By May 2018, Sometimes in Dreams had reached the No. 19 position on WFMU's album charts, leading medium rotation and officially entered the North American College and Community Radio (NACC) charts, tracking college radio airplay in the US and Canada.

== Til Morning Is Nigh ==
In November 2018, the band's eighth album,Til Morning Is Nigh: A Dream of Christmas, was released. Featuring new additional instrumentation including synth, organ and melodica, the band also welcomed a new member, Sylvia Solanas, who voices spoken word and with whom Serafin-Wells started a parallel dreampop band under the name Tremosphere.

As they started working on both an EP for Tremosphere and the Christmas album for Bipolar Explorer, Serafin-Wells got hit by a car in New York City, suffering from several severe injuries followed by a near-fatal pulmonary embolism, thus being hospitalized for several weeks.

Both albums were eventually recorded and released, Til Morning Is Nigh: A Dream of Christmas later than planned, at the end of 2018, and the Tremosphere EP turned into a full album, Interiors, in 2019, with Serafin-Wells still in convalescence.

Til Morning Is Nigh: A Dream of Christmas was well received, getting radio plays in Australia, as well as in America on WFMU, and in the UK on The Sound Projector Radio Show on London's Resonance FM.

== The Dark Outside, The Light Within/Til Morning Is Nigh Documentary ==
In July 2019 the band released their fifth single, The Dark Outside, The Light Within – composed and recorded for London's experimental radio show "The Dark Outside" and premiered in a special event broadcast on June 20, 2019, on London's 87.7fm.

July 2019 also marked the group's Dutch radio debut on Radio Hoogeveen's post-rock show, De Mist, and the completion of a six-part mini documentary about their eighth album – The Making of "Til Morning Is Nigh", which premiered episodically August–September 2019 on the band's YouTube channel.

== Deux Anges ==
On November 13, 2020, the band released its ninth album, the double-album, Deux Anges. UK zine The Sound Projector found the record "steeped in a very wistful melancholy, a poignant longing - with allusions in the lyrics to the afterlife, heaven, angels, mortality, ghosts, miracles - and the gentle, lulling pull of their mesmerizing songs." Deux Anges was named to multiple Best Albums of the Year lists - including Resonance FM's "Fog Cast", Radio Hoogeveen's "De Mist", The Irene Trudel Show WFMU and that of BBC 3 /Soho Radio’s broadcaster Max Reinhardt. Deux Anges reached the Heavily Played radio charts of both California’s KFJC - who premiered the album during a three hour special about the band on September 19, 2020 - and WFMU, where it stayed at the #23 spot seven months after its release.

== Forests, Voices, Coastlines, Dreams: Recordings for The Dark Outside/The Other Room Radio Show ==
On December 1, 2021, the band released their tenth album Forests, Voices, Coastlines, Dreams: Recordings for The Dark Outside comprising the seven experimental music pieces Serafin-Wells composed and the band recorded for the UK’s Dark Outside radio project between 2019 and 2021. WFMU DJ Irene Trudel, called it "Wondrous! A great album!" - Forests also found airplay on both London's Resonance FM and Soho Radio. On December 17, 2021,BBC 3 and Soho Radio broadcaster Max Reinhardt reviewed the new album on air, pronouncing it "Sublime. Maybe their finest. Brilliant. Brilliant."

France's CAMP Radio (cited by The Wire in their 100 Essential Online Stations feature), offered the band, in November 2021, their own monthly show. The first episode of Bipolar Explorer's "The Other Room", a monthly one-hour program of "experimental and ambient music, field recordings and otherness" aired on January 4, 2022, and can be found, archived, as future broadcasts will be, on the station's MixCloud page.

== Tenth anniversary Of Love and Loss ==
2022 marked the 10th anniversary of the release of Of Love and Loss. Michael Serafin-Wells, co-founder of the band, recorded and released a special solo live set for the occasion, and participated to an hour-long podcast with longtime friend actor Neal Huff called "Of Love" A Conversation with Michael Serafin-Wells and Neal Huff (available on SoundCloud).

== In The Hours Left Until Dawn ==
On April 7, 2023, the band released their 11th album, their 4th double-album, In The Hours Left Until Dawn. The new album was singled out for two important aspects in the development of their work - their continued multi-genre long-form recordings in the creation of soundscapes, and the spirituality under-pining these works.

In an extensive hour-long interview with BBC 3 and Soho Radio broadcaster Max Reinhardt introduced the segment by pronouncing the band "holy sonic icons" and characterized the new album as "breaking ground because it feels and sounds like a whole, an unstoppable beating heart that's emanating fragile sonics and thoughts and words at the fringes of consciousness and subconsciousness, sleep and waking, dream and vision."

Mr Reinhardt also posited that the work struck him as "almost like sacred music" - a theme that others would return to in describing the double-album. Jeffrey Davison of Montreal's CKUT-FM calling it "just a gorgeous, gorgeous album" and adding that "a lot of their music has a really strong spiritual undercurrent and maybe never more evident than on this new record’; while Portland's Uncertain Reverie found the album "Beautiful, shimmering, hypnotic, dreamlike; always a sense of passage through unnameable dimensions; the haunt is palpable but as an enveloping wonder and at times I felt I was listening to stained glass…"

Returning to the band's evolving musical style, the UK's music zine Fog Songs said "this is an album of nocturnal dreamscapes, a sprawling 2-hour long double-disc album, which is a bold and ambitious move to make in the year 2023. The band use effects-laden guitars, moody basslines, spoken word poetry, ambient synths, airy drones, abstract field recordings, swirling vocalizations, percussive instruments and trippy audio manipulation techniques to create these gorgeous shimmering soundscapes that both haunt and comfort...'In The Hours Left Until Dawn' is an album of pure atmosphere and feeling. It's an epic accomplishment, and a gorgeous work of art that contains pop sensibilities, trippy experimentations and everything in between."

As regards chart positions, the double-album held spots in Heavily Played Albums lists of both California's KFJC and New York's WFMU throughout the spring of 2023.

== The Distant Horizon and Memories of the Sky ==
In 2024, the band released a new single, The Distant Horizon, commissioned by Cities and Memory project. They also announced their new album, their twelfth, Memories of the Sky.

== Last Lights ==
Released on Summer Solstice 2026, their 13th album Last Lights was reviewed in edition 511 of The Wire (magazine) "like Windy & Carl at their gothiest - which is very welcome" and, according to Serafin-Wells's liner notes, was greatly inspired by French masters such as Gustave Courbet and Francois Truffaut.

== Former and affiliated members ==
- Sean Lahey (2008–2012, on hiatus) – guitar
- Kim Donovan (2015–2018) – spoken word
- Jason Sutherland (2012–2017) – guitar
- Eva Potter (2013–2014) – bass guitar
- Elizabeth Rossa (2009–2011) – bass guitar
- Alan Foreman (2012, on hiatus) – guitar, bass guitar
- Yves Gerard (early indie rock line up, 2005) – drums

== Discography ==
=== Albums ===
Year	Title
2005	Go Negative (earlier line-up)
2012	Of Love and Loss
2014	BPXmas
2015	Angels
2016	Electric Hymnal
2017	Dream Together
2018	Sometimes in Dreams
2018	Til Morning Is Nigh: A Dream of Christmas
2020	Deux Anges
2021	Forests, Voices, Coastlines, Dreams: Recordings for the Dark Outside
2023	In the Hours Left Until Dawn
2024	Memories of the Sky
2026	Last Lights

=== Singles ===
Year	Title
2013	(O Come O Come) Emmanuel
2015	Downtown Train
2016	We’ll All Go Together
2017	Watchers and Holy Ones
2018	Better Girl
2019	The Dark Outside, The Light Within
2020	eleven:eleven
2024	The Distant Horizon
2025	Dreams of the Bell Tower Watchman

== See also ==
- List of shoegazing musicians
- List of experimental musicians
