= Dotstokyo =

2010s former Japanese shoegaze idol group

dotstokyo
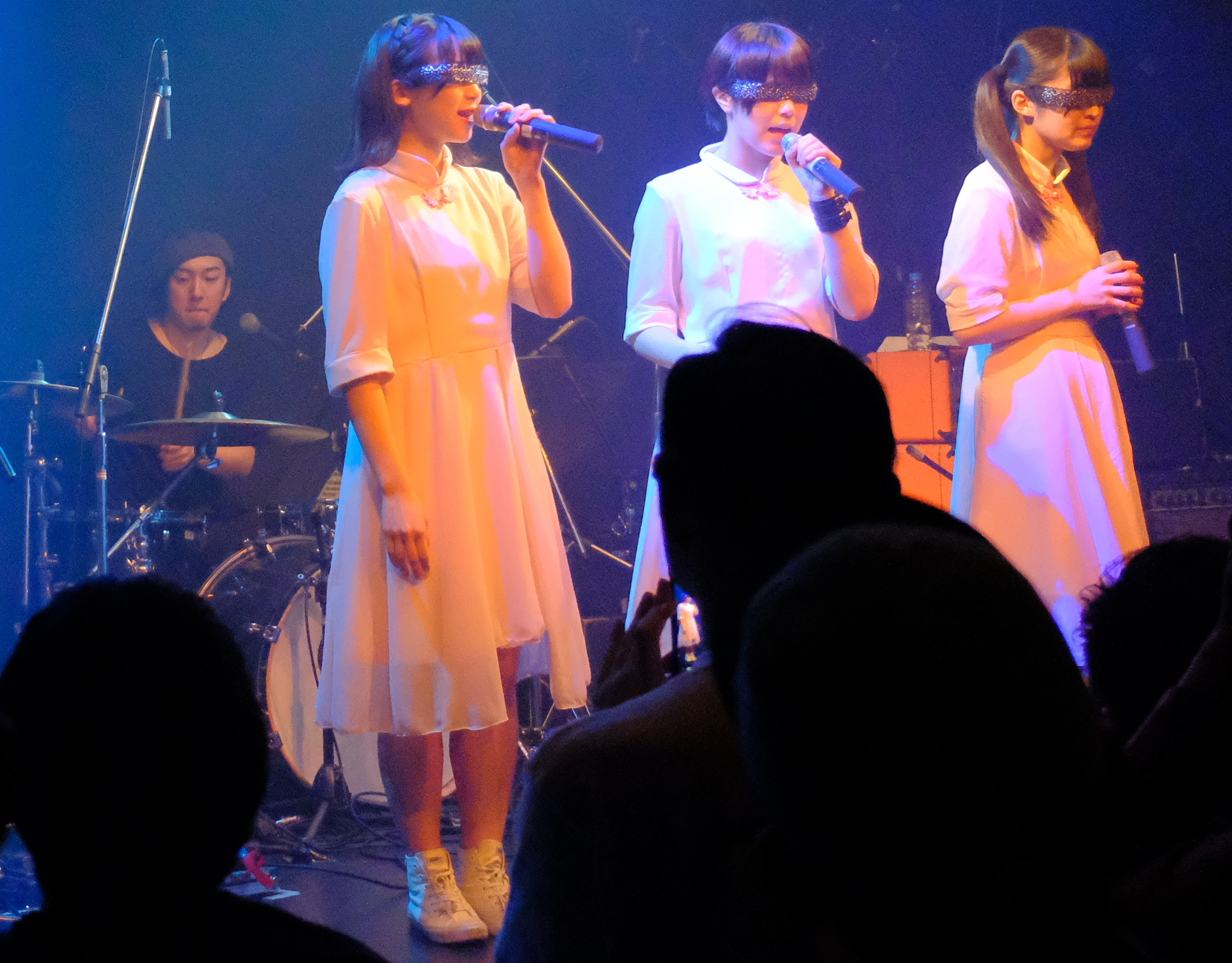
- dotstokyo performing in 2018

Background information
- Also known as: ・・・・・・・・・, dots, dotsnine, tenten, tenkyu
- Origin: Japan
- Genre: Shoegaze
- Years active: 2016–2019
- Labels: TRASH-UP!! RECORDS, Japan Connection Inc.
- Website: dots.tokyo

dotstokyo (stylized as ・・・・・・・・・) was a Japanese idol group active from 2016 to 2019.

== Name and members ==
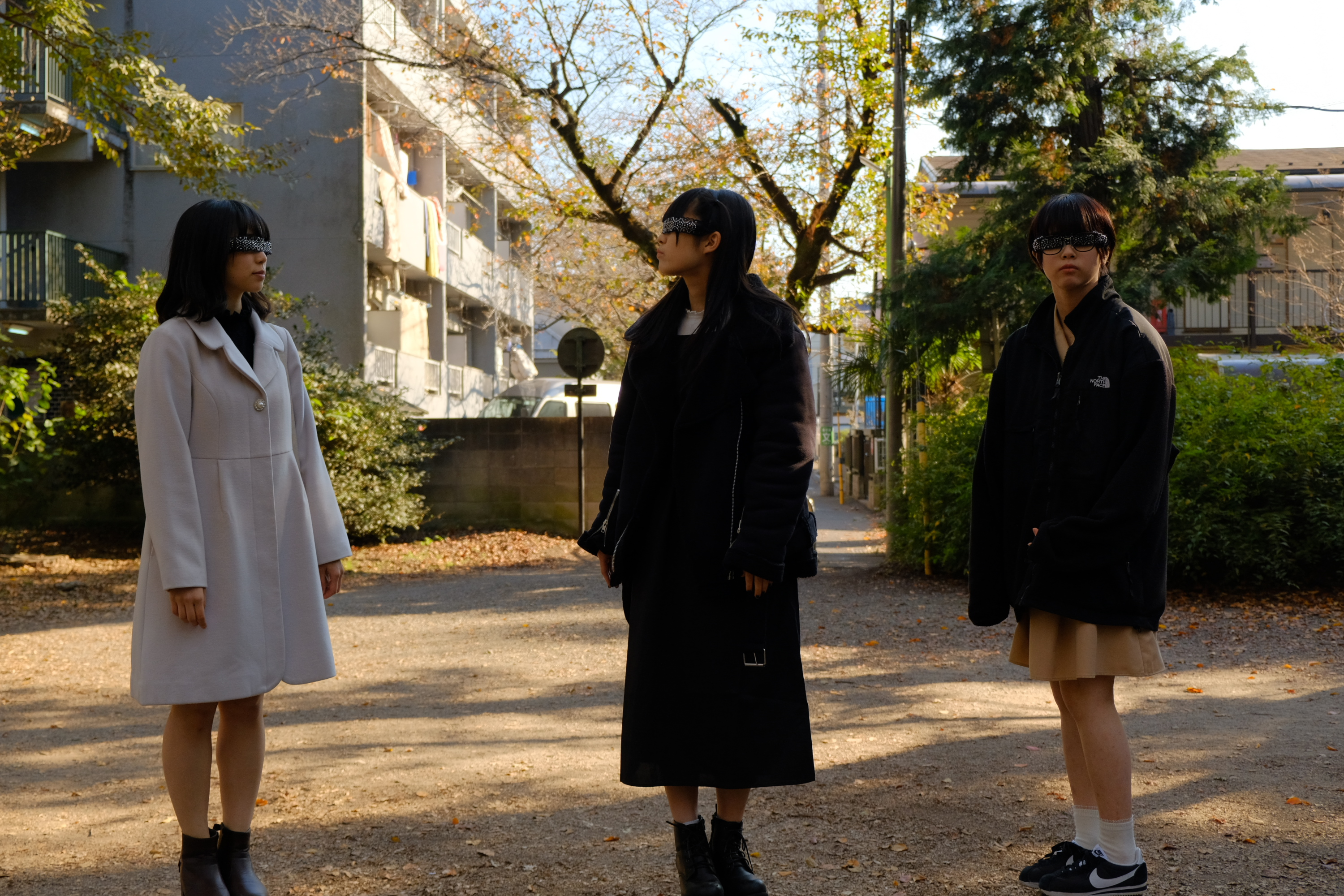
Three members of dotstokyo

There is no official pronunciation of the name – which consists of nine interpuncts originally representing the nine founding members, although the actual number of members varied over the history of the group and ten performers have been in the group in total, albeit not at the same time – but the group has referred to themselves in interviews and online variously as dots, dotstokyo, dotsnine, tenten, tenkyu (indicating that there are nine dots but also a pun off "thank you"), and so on.

== Background ==
A group members were selected at the Let's Create Tokyo for Girls!! Project Idol Audition held in April 2016.

All members are often given nicknames (identification symbols). "・(dot) is a new type of idol that can be in any form. It can become sound, light, smell, taste, vibration, symbols, words, 2D or 3D, inorganic or living things. Sometimes it takes the shape of a girl, and this state (the condition of a girl who actually meets at the scene with some kind of sunglasses and her face is hidden) is・(dot) chan. "

The song follows shoegaze and underground punk, and features performances using technology. Live shows are called observation and fans are called observers or dotchers (dot + watchers).

Live activities ended with the solo show Tokyo in Natural Machine on March 24, 2019. In terms of the concept, there is no definition of graduation or disbandment, and it is described as returning to the city without taking the form of a girl. The management team supports the activities of RAY, which was formed in the same year, and solo career of Uchiyama Yua, an ex-member of group.

== Discography ==
=== Singles ===
#	Release date	Title	Record label	Distribution format	Catalogue code (release ID)	Tracklist/notes
1	2017-01-09	Crunchy EP (an onomatopoeia, 'shuwashuwa')	Self-produced	CD-R		First CD-R, a limited edition for live venues; available in limited quantities at Tower Records Shinjuku starting October 14, 2017: 1. Satellite; 2. Cider; 3. Hey; 4. Satellite feat. Hatsune Miku; 5. Cider feat. Hatsune Miku; 6. Hey feat. Hatsune Miku
2	2017-08-16	CD	Trash-Up!! Records	CD	TUR-019	First single, the group's first nationally distributed disc; it consists conceptually of a single track broken into seven parts.: 1. Tokyo (composed by Tokyo1, Tokyo2, Tokyo3, Tokyo4); 2. Slide; 3. Trinity Dive; 4. Hey
3	2017-09-30 to 2017-10-22	Tokyo in Cage	Trash-Up!! Records presents: Idols and the Arts exhibit (Sep 30, 2017 - October 22, 2017)	Exhibited works		Second single
4	2017-10-17 to 2017-10-21	∞	Trash-Up!! Records presents: Idols and the Arts exhibit (Sep 30, 2017 - October 22, 2017)	CD		Third single

=== Albums ===
#	Release date	Title	Record label	Distribution format	Catalogue number	Tracklist/Notes
1	2018-01-12	Blank (styled as『 』)	Trash-Up!! Records	CD	TUR-021	The first album contains 10 tracks: 1. Ne; 2. That Night I Fell in Love With You; 3. Trinity Dive; 4. Feels Like a Soda Float; 5. Literary Girl; 6. Stardust Feedback; 7. Cider; 8. Satellite; 9. Slide; 10. 1998–
2	2019-04-04	Points	Trash-Up!! Records	CD	TUR-031	The second album contains 7 tracks.: 1. Shiduka No Umi; 2. Can You Feel the Change of Seasons?; 3. Two Diaries; 4. Sign; 5. Yolo No Taki; 6. Cream Soda No Yuutsu; 7. Several Nights, Some Goodbye (Until You Awake from the Dream Mix)

=== Split singles ===
#	Release date	Title	Record label	Distribution format	Catalogue code (release ID)	Tracklist/Notes
1	2018-08-15	「Tokyo Sentimental」 tipToe./・・・・・・・・・	6jomaProject	CD	AMOJ-6010	Split single CD with tipToe. Includes versions of the two groups that have been adapted independently.: 1. Soda Pop Aquarium / tipToe.; 2. Can You Feel the Change of Seasons? / ・・・・・・・・・; 3. Soda Float Kibun / tipToe.; 4. Cream Soda No Yuutsu / ・・・・・・・・・

== See also ==
- Japanese idols
