= Mary Cassidy =

Irish-born singer

Mary Cassidy is an Irish-born singer best known as the vocalist in bands Lulabox and Agnes.

In 2010, she collaborated with Chris Standring for the one-off project Blond.
