= Dina Ögon =

Swedish dream pop band

- Origin: Stockholm, Sweden
- Genres: Dream pop, indie pop, sunshine pop, retro-soul
- Years active: 2020–present
- Labels: Sing a Song Fighter Records, Playground Music Scandinavia, Mr Bongo Records
- Members: Anna Ahnlund; Daniel Ögren; Christopher Cantillo; Love Örsan

Dina Ögon is a dream pop and retro-soul band from Sweden who won two Grammis awards in 2024. The group was founded in Stockholm in 2020 by guitarist and singer Anna Ahnlund, multi-instrumentalist Daniel Ögren, bassist Love Örsan and drummer Christopher Cantillo. They released their first album in 2021: Dina Ögon. In 2022, the group composed their second album, Oas, released in 2023, winning in two Grammis categories. Their third album, Orion, followed one year later in February 2024, becoming the band's first appearance on the Swedish pop chart Sverigetopplistan at number 11. They released a double album on 6 February 2026 – Människobarn – examining love and heartbreak with darker pop sounds.

Dina Ögon, which means "Your Eyes" in English, features songs with Swedish language lyrics. The band has been compared to the Swedish psychedelic rock band Dungen, the Cocteau Twins, Khruangbin, Fleetwood Mac, ABBA and more. Their music draws from many different genres including hip-hop, sunshine pop, soul, R&B, folk, jazz, indie pop, synth-pop and Brazilian bossa nova.

== Formation ==
The members of Dina Ögon worked together in various combinations in Stockholm prior to forming the group. Guitarist and singer Anna Ahnlund won the award for Lyricist of the Year (Årets Textförfattare) in 2015 at Manifestgalan. Bassist Love Örsan had met multi-instrumentalist Daniel Ögren while they were both supporting Swedish composer Sven Wunder. Ögren's 2020 album Fastingen – 92 involved Ahnlund and drummer Christopher Cantillo recording the song "Idag" in 2019, with lyrics by Ahnlund. This project directly sparked the idea of Dina Ögon.

Dina Ögon formed in 2020 and released the album Dina Ögon in October 2021, through Sing a Song Fighter Records, the imprint of Karl-Jonas Winqvist of First Floor Power. Mixed by Ögren, the singles "Tombola 94", "Efter natten" and "Undantag" received airplay, and "Tombola 94" was listed as a favourite track by Tyler, the Creator. The press compared the band to the Texas psychedelic trio Khruangbin and the British-American band Fleetwood Mac. The band toured in 2022, playing sets at Nattjazz in Norway and many other Scandinavian venues.

== Second album and Grammis awards ==
After signing to Playground Music Scandinavia, the band spent almost a year composing and rehearsing songs for their second album, Oas (English: Oasis). The recording of ten basic tracks for Oas took only one day at Studio Gagarin owned by composer Andreas Tengblad, mainly capturing the desired drum sound in the professional studio. Overdubs and vocals were added at the band's own rehearsal space, the total process taking about two weeks. The album was released in February 2023, preceded by the single "Mormor" (English: "Grandma"). The website Scandinavian Soul described the band as "Swedish soul" reminiscent of the Swedish pop band Gimmicks combined with the sunny optimism of ABBA. The British label Mr Bongo Records handled foreign distribution of Oas, and also re-issued the first album. Dina Ögon performed a live set at Atlantis Studios, videos of which were uploaded to YouTube, including "Mormor" and "Undantag". The band performed at Lollapalooza in Stockholm in June, filling in for Beabadoobee who had cancelled. In August 2023, Playground Music released a 7-inch 45 rpm single from the Atlantis sessions: "Mellan Slagen" (English: "Between the Battles") featuring the Swedish rapper Broder John. Another collaboration was made in October 2023 featuring Swedish singer Seinabo Sey and Dina Ögon covering the 2013 Håkan Hellström hit song "Fri till slut" (English: "Free at Last"), produced by Spotify. In May 2024, the album Oas earned Dina Ögon two Grammis awards, for Album of the Year and for Alternative Pop of the Year. The band performed "Mormor" at the ceremony. They performed select dates in Europe and the UK from April to September, played the Stortorget stage at Malmöfestivalen in August, and they headlined Amnesty International's September concert Amnesty Live 2024.

== Orion and Människobarn ==
After such a positive response to Oas, Dina Ögon created a third album, Orion, which was released one year later, in February 2024. Orion was praised by the media, with D2 magazine saying that the band had "made Sweden exotic again." The album gave the band their first pop chart entry, hitting number 11 on the Sverigetopplistan album listing. Orion was nominated for a Grammis award in February 2025, once again in the alternative pop category. The band toured to support the album, including a March–April 2025 spin through Scandinavia managed by Headstomp Productions. Dina Ögon played MaiJazz in Stavanger in May, Parksnäckan in Uppsala in June, and further Scandinavia dates during July–August 2025. They recorded new material in May 2025 at Svenska Grammofonstudion in Göteborg.

In 2025, the band announced their fourth album, Människobarn. The album, the title of which translates to Human child in English, is scheduled to be promoted by a tour through Sweden, Denmark and Norway, managed again by Headstomp. Människobarn was released as a double album on 6 February 2026. Writing for the Swedish newspaper Aftonbladet, music producer Per Magnusson described the album as high fidelity, delivering "a melancholic twilight" with the band leaning toward a darker style of pop, and lyrics covering a wide spectrum of topics including new love, sadness and contentment. The newspaper Borås Tidning said the album displays the band's affinity for trip hop and avant pop, with touches of lounge music, funk and teen pop.

== Members ==
- Anna Ahnlund – vocals, guitar
- Daniel Ögren – guitar, keyboards
- Christopher Cantillo – drums
- Love Örsan – bass guitar

== Discography ==
- Dina Ögon (2021)
- Oas (2023)
- Orion (2024)
- Människobarn (2026)

== See also ==
- List of dream pop artists
- List of Swedes in music
