= Lulabox =

- Lulabox, 1993.

Background information
- Origin: London
- Genres: Shoegaze, downtempo
- Years active: 1993–1994
- Labels: MCA; Radioactive Records
- Past members: Mary Cassidy; Michael Cozzi; Stephen Ferrara

Lulabox were a London-based three-piece shoegaze band, active from 1993 to 1994. The band, who were signed to Radioactive Records consisted of Mary Cassidy (vocals), Michael Cozzi (guitar) and Stephen Ferrara (drums, bass, keyboards, percussion, programming). Recorded and Mixed by Kevin Killen.

== Discography ==
=== Studio albums ===
- Lulabox CD (1993, Radioactive Records)

=== Singles and EPs ===
- "Full Bleed EP" CD / Maxi / 12" (1992, Radioactive)
- "Choked" CD / Maxi / 12" (1993, Radioactive)
- "Prayer For Rain" CD / 12" (1993, Radioactive)
- "I Believe" CD / 12" (1993, Radioactive)
- "Ride On" 12" (1993, Radioactive)
