= Us Amongst The Rest =

English hard rock band

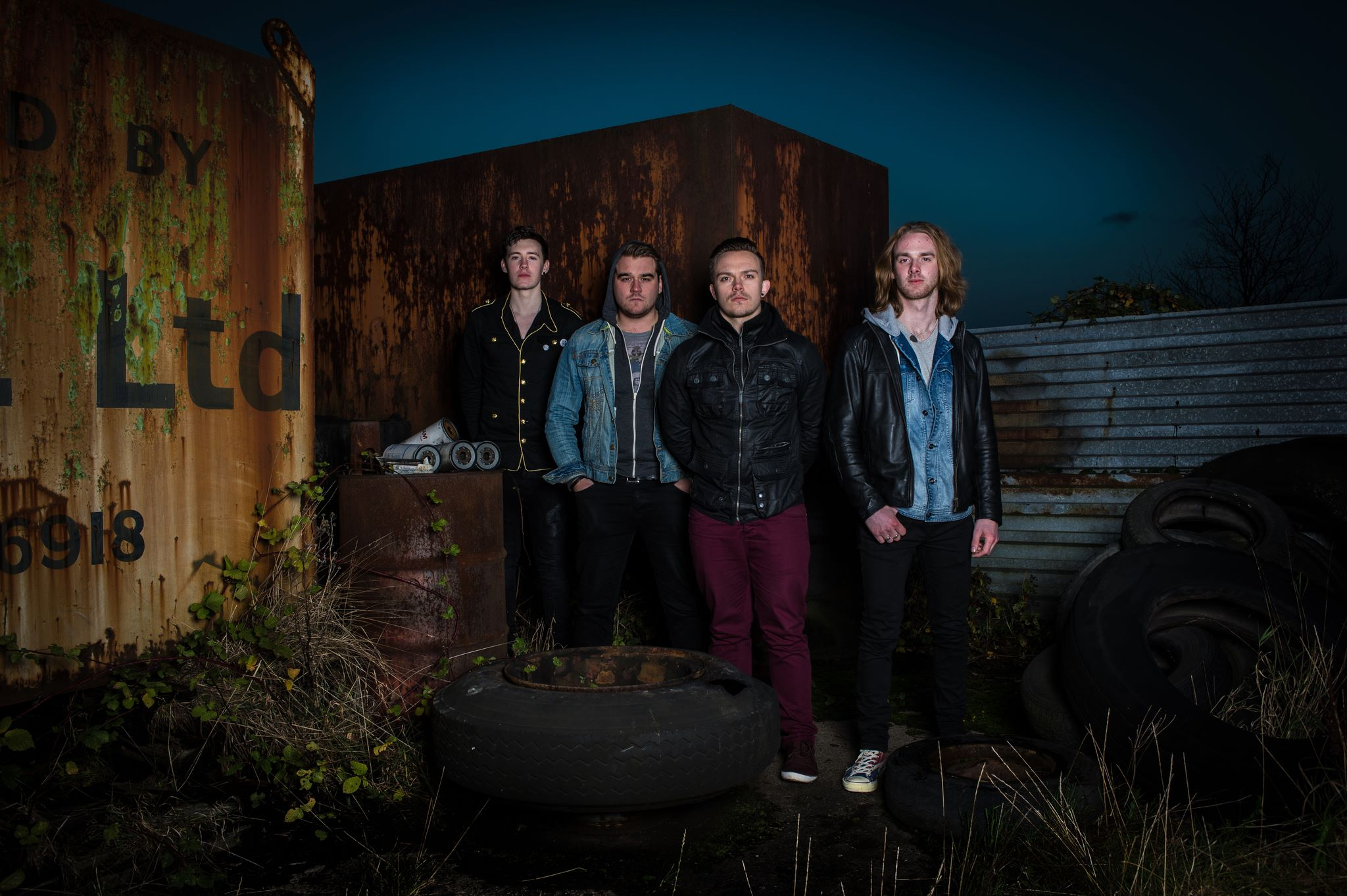
- Us Amongst The Rest

Background information
- Origin: York, North Yorkshire, England
- Genres: Hard rock, post-hardcore, alternative rock
- Years active: 2012–present
- Members: Karl Sandor; Paul Fernandez; Danny Beardmore; Dan Stockdale
- Website: www.uatrband.com

Us Amongst The Rest is an English hard rock band from York, England. The band has shared stages with Heaven's Basement and were at a show with members of Asking Alexandria in their hometown of York to perform a secret DJ set. Us Amongst The Rest recorded their debut studio album at Innersound Studios. It was released in 2014. The name of the band derives from an ironic perception that all new bands sound the same.

== Media ==
Us Amongst The Rest's debut BBC radio broadcast was on "Introducing" Jericho Keys' BBC Radio York show on 10 August 2013 when he played the track "Fields of Fray". This was followed this up by playing the re-mastered version of the track "Fields of Fray" during the following show on 25 January 2014 being played before The Voice contestant Beth McCarthy. It was during this show Jericho Keys announced the band's plans to completely re-record the album on self release. Bearded described the "Fields of Fray" as "Hauntingly good. Phenomenal." The band were interviewed in January 2014 by Hassle Magazine and cited their main musical influences as Alter bridge and Alexisonfire.

== Debut album ==
Us Amongst The Rest recorded their debut album at Innersound Studios, York, and it was produced by Sam and Joe Grave (who have notably worked with Glamour of the Kill, With One Last Breath, Axewound, Asking Alexandria, Deaf Havana and Yashin). The release date was 29 September 2014.
