= Lovely Summer Chan =

Japanese singer and songwriter

Lovely Summer Chan ラブリーサマーちゃん
- Born: Aika Imaizumi (今泉 愛夏); July 29, 1995 (age 30); Tokyo, Japan
- Genres: J-pop; rock
- Occupations: Singer; songwriter
- Years active: 2013-present
- Labels: Bubbly Summer; Victor Entertainment; Nippon Columbia
- Formerly of: For Tracy Hyde
- Website: www.lovelysummerchan.com

Aika Imaizumi (今泉 愛夏, Imaizumi Aika; born July 29, 1995), known professionally as Lovely Summer Chan (ラブリーサマーちゃん, Raburī Samā-chan), is a Japanese singer and songwriter. From 2014 to 2015, she was the lead vocalist of the band For Tracy Hyde.

== Career ==
=== 2013-2015: Early music career ===
In high school, Lovely Summer Chan was part of her high school's light music club. The first song she composed was "Tsuki no Hikarikata." In 2013, she began producing music at home and posting music on SoundCloud.

Lovely Summer Chan sang on the chorus of Tofubeats's second single, "Disco no Kami-sama", which was released on March 14, 2014. In April 2014, she released the song "Hajimemashite" digitally, and in July of the same year, she and singer Yoshino Arakawa opened a crowdfunding campaign on Picnic to release a physical version of their collaboration album, Yoshi Yoshi, Summer! The campaign was successful and the album was later sold in February 2015. In December 2014, she collaborated with Universe Nekoko, releasing "Universe Nekoko and Lovely Summer Chan" digitally.

From 2014 to 2015, Lovely Summer Chan was the lead vocalist of the band For Tracy Hyde. Lovely Summer Chan appeared on Kosmo Kat's extended play, Eresora, as a featured artist in the title track "Eresora", which was released on July 8, 2015. For her 20th birthday, Lovely Summer Chan released the single "Bedroom no Yume" digitally on July 29, 2015. The single later saw a physical release on September 9, 2015, under the title "Bedroom no Yume E.P." On November 11, 2015, Lovely Summer Chan released her debut album, #Lovely Music, with "Watashi no Suki na Mono" as the lead track.

=== 2016-present: Major label debut ===
In April 2016, Lovely Summer Chan announced she would be releasing one monthly single over the next three consecutive months. The first of the singles, "Love Desho?", was produced by Muteki Dead Snake and released digitally on April 6, 2016. "Part-Time Robot", which was inspired by Britpop, was later released digitally on May 18, 2016. "Aoi Mabataki no Tochū de", a rock tune, was released digitally on June 22, 2016.

On August 20, 2016, Lovely Summer Chan announced that she would be making her major label debut on Victor Entertainment's label, Speedstar Records, with the release of her album, LSC, on November 2, 2016. The lead track of the album is "Anata wa Tobacco Watashi wa Shabon." "202", which featured rapper Makura Izumi, was pre-released as a vinyl single on September 28, 2016, to promote the album. LSC also included her earlier compositions such as "Tsuki no Hikarikata" and "My Sweet Chocolate Baby!" Lovely Summer Chan revealed that Victor Entertainment offered to sign her to their agency through Twitter as early as Q2 2014, after hearing her original demo for "Anata wa Tobacco Watashi wa Shabon" on SoundCloud. Her major label debut was originally planned for 2015, but she delayed it to produce more songs for the album.

On August 2, 2017, Lovely Summer Chan released her first extended play, Ningen no Tochi. The extended play is named after the Japanese translated title of the 1939 novel Wind, Sand and Stars. "Fly Fly Fly", the lead track, was inspired by a skydiving trip Lovely Summer Chan took while trying to think of ideas for her next song.

Lovely Summer Chan was featured on a remix of "Chururira Summer Fish" by the Peggies, which appeared in their extended play Natsumeki Summer E.P. and was released digitally on July 5, 2018. She appeared as a featured artist on Makura Izumi's song "Inochi", which was released digitally on November 7, 2018. On April 22, 2019, Lovely Summer Chan released "Millennium" and "Ima wa Shōnen no Mama no Kimi" as a double A-side digital single, with "Millennium" featured in a commercial for Fujitsu's Lifebook laptop product line. Later in the year, Lovely Summer Chan re-released "Universe Nekoko and Lovely Summer Chan" on vinyl on October 23, 2019. In December 2019, she released "LSC2000" and "Santa Claus ni Onegai" as a double A-side single at one of her live events.

On September 15, 2020, Lovely Summer Chan released her third studio album, The Third Summer of Love, as a digital download, CD, and vinyl. The album was nominated for a Music Award at the 4th Apple Vinegar Music Award in 2021. On December 11, 2020, "LSC2000" and "Santa Claus ni Onegai" were re-released on vinyl.

== Personal life ==
Lovely Summer Chan attended middle school and high school with all three members of The Peggies, and they graduated in the same year. In 2019, she revealed she was studying at Nihon University. She graduated in March 2020. She keeps her face hidden in her public appearances.

== Artistry and influences ==
Lovely Summer Chan describes herself as a "youthful rock gal." She cites The Brilliant Green and their lead vocalist, Tomoko Kawase, as influences to her music. She uses Cubase to produce her songs.

Ningen no Tochi, Lovely Summer Chan's first extended play, experimented with Shibuya-kei sounds, drawing inspiration from The Brilliant Green and Cymbals.

== Discography ==
=== Studio albums ===
List of albums, with selected chart positions, sales figures and certifications
Title	Year	Album details	Peak chart positions		Sales
Title	Year	Album details	JPN Oricon	JPN Hot	Sales
Yoshi Yoshi, Summer! (よしよし、サマー！) (with Yoshino Yoshikawa)	2014	Released: February 4, 2014; Label: —; Format: CD, digital download	—	—	—
#Lovely Music (#ラブリーミュージック)	2015	Released: November 11, 2015; Label: Bubbly Summer; Format: CD, digital download	95	—	—
LSC	2016	Released: November 2, 2016; Label: Victor Entertainment; Format: CD, digital download	26	60	—
The Third Summer of Love	2020	Released: September 16, 2020; Label: Nippon Columbia; Format: CD, digital download, vinyl	30	43	JPN: 931 (digital)
"—" denotes releases that did not chart or were not released in that region.

=== Extended plays ===
List of extended plays, with selected chart positions, sales figures and certifications
Title	Year	Album details	Peak chart positions	Sales
Title	Year	Album details	JPN	Sales
Ningen no Tochi (人間の土地)	2017	Released: August 2, 2017; Label: Victor Entertainment; Format: CD, digital download	52	—
"—" denotes releases that did not chart or were not released in that region.

=== Singles ===
==== As lead artist ====
List of singles, with selected chart positions, sales figures and certifications
Title	Year	Peak chart positions	Sales	Album
Title	Year	JPN	Sales	Album
"Hajimemashite" (はじめまして)	2014	—	—N/a	Yoshi Yoshi, Summer!
"Oyasumi" (おやすみ)	2014	—	—N/a	#Lovely Music
"Luminescence" (ルミネセンス)	2014	—	—N/a	#Lovely Music
"Universe Nekoko and Lovely Summer Chan" (宇宙ネコ子とラブリーサマーちゃん) (with Universe Nekoko)	2014	—	—N/a	Non-album single
"Bedroom no Yume" (ベッドルームの夢) (Note: "Bedroom no Yume" was physically released under the title "Bedroom no Yume E.P." The chart and sales ranking reflects the physical release.)	2015	74	—N/a	#Lovely Music
"Love Desho?" (LOVE♡でしょ？) (prod. by Muteki Dead Snake)	2016	—	—N/a	Non-album single
"Part-Time Robot"	2016	—	—N/a	LSC
"Aoi Mabataki no Tochū de" (青い瞬きの途中で)	2016	—	—N/a	LSC
"202" (feat. Makura Izumi)	2016	—	—N/a	LSC
"Millennium" (ミレニアム) (Note: "Millennium" and "Ima wa Shōnen no Mama no Kimi" were released as a double A-side single. The chart and sales ranking reflects both songs combined.)	2019	—	—N/a	The Third Summer of Love
"Ima wa Shōnen no Mama no Kimi" (今は少年のままの君)	2019	—	—N/a	Non-album single
"LSC2000" (Note: "LSC2000" and "Santa Claus ni Onegai" were released as a double A-side single. The chart and sales ranking reflects both songs combined.)	2019	—	—N/a	The Third Summer of Love
"Santa Claus ni Onegai" (サンタクロースにお願い)	2019	—	—N/a	Non-album single
"—" denotes releases that did not chart or were not released in that region.

==== As featured artist ====
List of singles, with selected chart positions, sales figures and certifications
Title	Year	Peak chart positions	Sales	Album
Title	Year	JPN	Sales	Album
"Inochi" (いのち) (Makura Izumi feat. Lovely Summer Chan)	2018	—	—N/a	Non-album single
"—" denotes releases that did not chart or were not released in that region.

=== Other appearances ===
Title	Year	Peak chart positions	Sales	Album
Title	Year	JPN	Sales	Album
"Eresora" (エレ空) (Kosmo Kat feat. Lovely Summer Chan & Cherry Brown)	2015	—	—N/a	Eresora
"Chururira Summer Fish" (ちゅるりらサマフィッシュ) (Lovely Summer Chan remix) (The Peggies)	2018	—	—N/a	Natsumeki Summer E.P.
"—" denotes releases that did not chart or were not released in that region.
