= For Tracy Hyde =

Japanese shoegaze group

- Origin: Tokyo, Japan
- Genres: J-pop, Shoegaze, Dream pop
- Years active: 2012-2023
- Members: Eureka, Natsubot, Mav, Soukou
- Past members: Marcie, Lovely Summer Chan, U-1
- Website: fortracyhyde.com

For Tracy Hyde was a J-pop band, formed in 2012. The group started as the solo project of Natsubot, real name Azusa Suga, before adding more members over time. At the time of its breakup, it consisted of guitarist Suga, singer and guitarist Eureka, bassist Mav, and drummer Soukou. The band's music was primarily written by Suga. The group was named after the song "Tracy Hide" by American band Wondermints. Suga was unaware of actress Tracy Hyde at the time.

== History ==
=== 2010s ===
The band released their debut album, "Film bleu", on December 2, 2016, through P-Vine Records. The album had two release parties, one in Tokyo and one in Osaka, featuring artists including dotstokyo, who the band has composed songs for. They released their next album, "he(r)art", under a year later on November 2, 2017. Also in 2017, the band was named as one of Space Shower's New Force artists. In 2018, Sougou joined the band, replacing Marcie.

The band released their third album, "New Young City", on September 4, 2019. The album was heavily inspired by Shibuya-kei. They toured the album through Asia, including countries like the Philippines and Singapore.

=== 2020s ===
The band's fourth album, "Ethernity", was released on February 17, 2021. In May 2022, they released a split single with shoegaze idol group Ray, whose album "Green" was produced by Suga. In October 2022, the band played at the Baybeats festival in Singapore. On December 14, 2022, the band released their fifth album "Hotel Insomnia". The album received praise from Pitchfork and NPR. The band announced a 2023 Japan tour for the album, featuring a co-headline with former singer Lovely Summer Chan. The band disbanded on March 25, 2023, following the final show of their tour, in Tokyo.

== Discography ==
=== Studio albums ===
- 2016: Film bleu
- 2017: he(r)art
- 2019: New Young City
- 2021: Ethernity
- 2022: Hotel Insomnia

=== EPs ===
- 2012: Juniper and Lamplight
- 2013: Satellite Lovers
- 2013: All About Ivy
- 2014: In Fear of Love
- 2014: Born to Be Breathtaken
