= Rev Rev Rev =

Italian contemporary shoegaze band

Rev Rev Rev is an Italian shoegaze and psychedelic band formed in Modena in 2011 by Sebastian Lugli and Laura Iacuzio, then joined by Andrea Dall'Omo and Greta Benatti.

Since the beginning, they made wide use of self-built guitar pedals.

Their debut single "Catching a buzz", released in October 2014 with WinWin Records (created by former One Little Indian head of press Tones Sanson), has been featured on Steve Lamacq's show on BBC 6 Radio and premiered on Clash Music. Their eponymous debut album was hailed at by the critics as one of the best self released albums in Italian indie rock and was followed by a string of singles and a couple of european tours hitting UK, France, Germany, Belgium, Czech Republic, Slovenia, Austria, Switzerland and Italy.

In February 2016 they released their sophomore album "Des Fleurs Magiques Bourdonnaient" on the Canadian label Northern Light Records and the American label Custom Made Music. The album contains several references to Symbolist poetry and in particular to Rimbaud and Baudelaire. After quickly selling out, the album was reprinted by US label Neon Sigh (Ringo Deathstarr, The Telescopes). The album was included among the best of 2016 by main genre webzines and independent radios like Drowned in Sound, Sounds Better With Reverb, DKFM Radio, Shoegazer Alive, TBTCI, Primal Music.

Their live set at Manchester's Cosmosis Festival, headlined by The Jesus and Mary Chain, Brian Jonestown Massacre, The Raveonettes and WIRE, started a 44-date tour touching UK, France, Belgium, Austria, Switzerland and Italy, during which the quartet shared the stage with The Telescopes, Ringo Deathstarr and Gonjasufi.

The band were invited overseas at SXSW 2019 in Austin, Texas, where their live set impressed Bob Boilen of All Songs Considered and earned them a feature on NPR's SXSW wrap-up as well as airplay on the network's radios.

In 2017 they have been named as "one of Europe’s finest 'gazer bands of the last decade" by Daily Bandcamp.

In 2019 they signed with cult indie psych label Fuzz Club and released their third album 'Kykeon', produced by James Aparicio (who had produced, among others, Spiritualized, Mogwai, Nick Cave).

“Kykeon” was a psychedelic drink made up of several ingredients, consumed during Eleusinian Mysteries, a set of rites, ceremonies and experiences held in the ancient Greece. Rev Rev Rev's Kykeon has been defined on American print magazine Big Takeover "Abrasive, fuzzed-up and feedback-jammed amalgamation of woozy shoegaze warp, psychedelic noir drone and corrosive noise rock".

According to NPR, "fuzzy psych outfit Rev Rev Rev have perfected an atmospheric wall-of-sound that brings to mind shoegaze predecessors like My Bloody Valentine."

Belgian Sideline Magazine commented that '“Kykeon” is much more than simply shoegaze. There also is a solid industrial touch running through the work. It creates a real heavy production, dominated by industrial guitar play. The guitar play is absolutely impressive, injecting a true spirit to the work."

At the beginning of 2020 the band performed at Eurosonic 2020, where they have been recommended by Clash Magazine among the "five new bands to watch out for".

Also Crack Magazine mentioned their live set among the best performances seen at the festival.

In 2021 the band was selected as INES Talent by the Innovation Network of European Showcases, and played UK's Liverpool Sound City and Argentinian NMER Festival, both taking place online due to Covid pandemic restrictions.

In 2022 the song '3 not 3', excerpt from their third album "Kykeon", was included in the soundtrack of the short movie "In Quanto a Noi" by Italian filmmaker Simone Massi, alongside the narrating voice of German filmmaker Wim Wenders. The film was presented at Venice Film Festival.
