= Ray (girl group) =

Japanese idol girl group

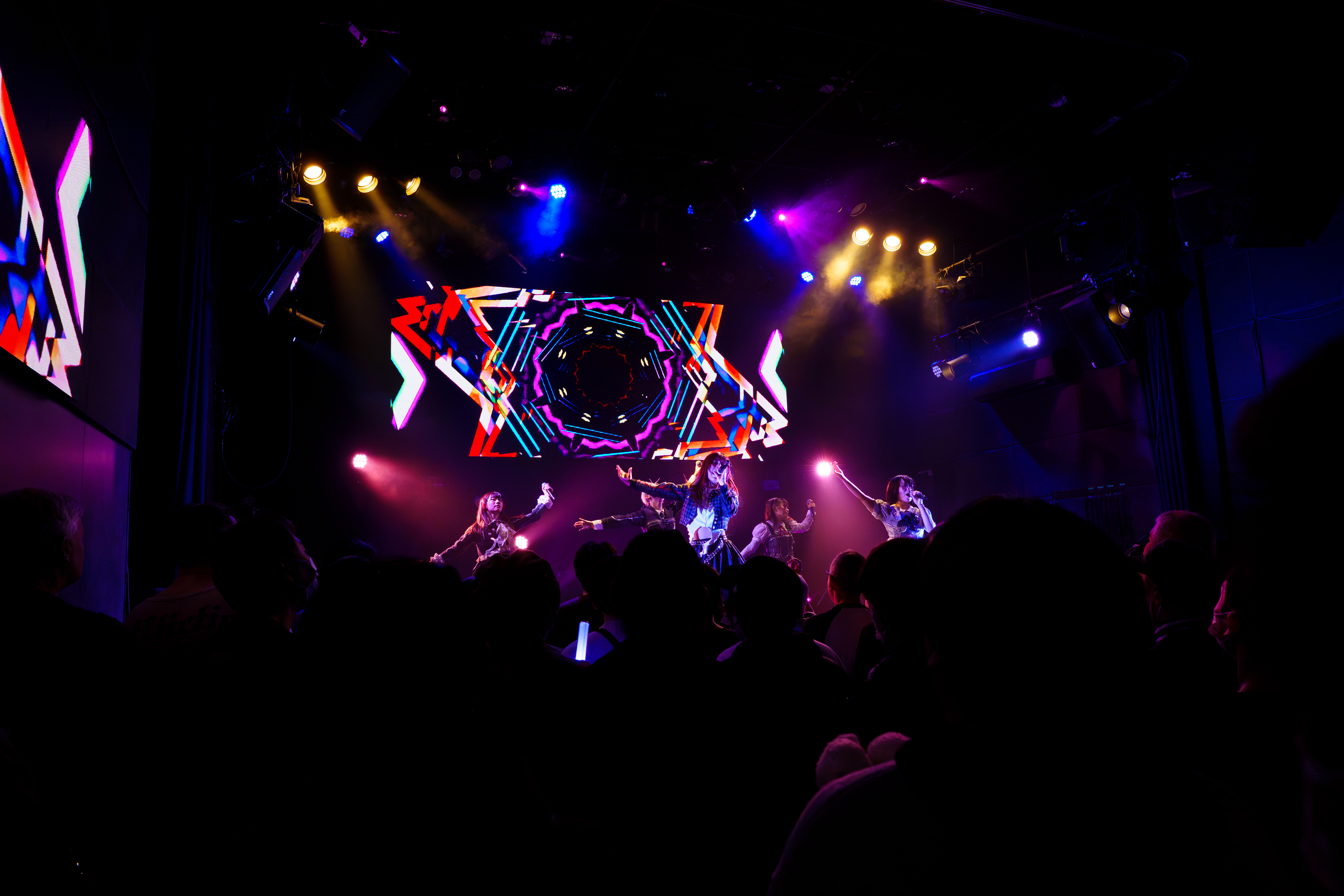
- Ray in February 2026

Background information
- Origin: Japan
- Genres: J-pop; shoegaze
- Years active: 2019–present
- Label: Sova
- Members: Yūa Uchiyama; Mao Tsukiumi; Mikoto Tsumugi; Yuki Harune
- Past members: Sayaka Shirakawa; Marino Kai; Tsukihi; Shizuku Kotoyama; Ami
- Website: r-a-y.world

Ray (レイ); stylized in all caps, is a Japanese idol girl group that formed in 2019.

== History ==
Ray was formed on April 15, 2019. The initial line-up consisted of four members: Sayaka Shirakawa, Tsukihi, Marino Kai, and Yūa Uchiyama. They performed live for the first time on May 1. They released their debut single, "Blue", on October 30. The lead track from the single, titled "Meteor", was produced by American shoegaze band Ringo Deathstarr, while the second track "Butterfly Effect" was produced by Natsubot of For Tracy Hyde, and the third track "Sekai no Owari wa Kimi to Futari de" was produced by Yusuke Hata of Cruyff in the Bedroom.

They released their debut album, Pink, on May 23, 2020. They held their first solo concert on May 11. On November 19, Ray transferred to the agency Sova.

Sayaka Shirakawa graduated from the group on February 23, 2021. Shizuku Kotoyama joined the group on July 3.

They released their second album, Green, on May 25, 2022. On July 23, Marino Kai and Tsukihi left the group. Mao Tsukiumi and Mikoto Tsumugi joined the group on September 19.

On February 1, 2023, they released the split EP, Atmosphere, with Dai Dai Dai and Crossnoesis. In 2023, Ray released a digital single every month from February to July. The first of the singles, "Dokusho Nikki" was released on February 19, followed by "Himitsu ga Itaiyo" on March 25, then "Tameiki wo Sagashite" on April 23, then "Frontier" on May 27, then "This is not a love song" on June 25, and "Bloom" on July 29. All six of the digital singles were featured on their third album, Camellia, which was released on October 18.

Their first EP, Vase, was released on April 3, 2024.

Their second EP, Seasons, was released on March 5, 2025. Ami graduated from the group on May 4. They released their fourth album, White, on October 1. On October 30, Yuki Harune joined the group.

Shizuku Kotoyama graduated from the group on September 23, 2026.

== Members ==
=== Current ===
- Yūa Uchiyama (内山結愛)
- Mao Tsukiumi (月海まお)
- Mikoto Tsumugi (紬実詩)
- Yuki Harune (春音友希)

=== Former ===
- Sayaka Shirakawa (白川さやか)
- Marino Kai (甲斐莉乃)
- Tsukihi (月日)
- Ami (愛海)
- Shizuku Kotoyama (琴山しずく)

== Discography ==
=== Studio albums ===
List of studio albums, with selected details and chart positions
Title	Details	Peak chart positions	
Title	Details	JPN	JPN Hot
Pink	Released: May 23, 2020; Label: Distorted Records; Formats: CD, digital download, streaming	—	—
Green	Released: May 25, 2022; Label: Lonesome Record; Formats: CD, digital download, streaming	46	71
Camellia	Released: October 18, 2023; Label: Lonesome Record; Formats: CD, digital download, streaming	45	56
White	Released: October 1, 2025; Label: Lonesome Record; Formats: CD, digital download, streaming	—	—

=== Live albums ===
List of live albums, with selected details
Title	Details
Keep Idol & Shoegaze (Live at Club Seata, 2024)	Released: October 30, 2024; Label: Ray; Formats: digital download, streaming

=== Extended plays ===
List of EPs, with selected details
Title	Details
Atmosphere Split EP with Dai Dai Dai and Crossnoesis	Released: February 1, 2023; Label: Lonesome Record; Formats: CD, digital download, streaming
Vase	Released: April 3, 2024; Label: Lonesome Record; Formats: CD, digital download, streaming
Seasons	Released: March 5, 2025; Label: Lonesome Record; Formats: CD, digital download, streaming

=== Singles ===
List of singles, with selected chart positions, showing year released and album name
Title	Year	Peak chart positions	Album
Title	Year	JPN	Album
"Blue"	2019	—	Pink
"Yellow"	2021	22	Green
"Furanbowāzu Parfait no Tame ni" (フランボワーズ・パルフェのために) with For Tracy Hyde	2022	—	Non-album single
"Moment"	2022	—	Vase
"Dokusho Nikki" (読書日記)	2023	—	Camellia
"Himitsu ga Itaiyo" (秘密がいたいよ)	2023	—	Camellia
"Tameiki wo Sagashite" (ため息をさがして)	2023	—	Camellia
"Frontier" (フロンティア)	2023	—	Camellia
"This is not a love song" (ディス・イズ・ノット・ア・ラブソング)	2023	—	Camellia
"Bloom"	2023	—	Camellia
"Winter Greetings (冬の手紙)	2024	—	Non-album singles
"Tsugare Yosare Bushi (津軽よされ節)	2024	—	Non-album singles
"I see the light"	2024	—	Non-album singles
"Hatsukoi Cider" (初恋サイダー) Cover of Buono!	2024	—	Non-album singles
"See ya!"	2024	—	White
"Otogi" (おとぎ)	2025	—	White
"Tentai" (天体)	2025	—	White
"Bittersweet"	2025	—	White
"—" denotes a recording that did not chart or was not released in that territory.
