= Uchuu Nekoko =

Japanese shoegaze band formed in 2012

- Origin: Kanagawa, Japan
- Genres: Dream pop, Shoegaze, alternative rock
- Years active: 2012–present
- Labels: LOOM; P-Vine Records
- Members: Nemuko Yamanaka; Kano
- Past members: Kо̄hei Tanabe

Uchuu Nekoko (宇宙ネコ子, Uchū Nekoko), also known as Universe Nekoko, is a Japanese dream pop duo from Kanagawa formed in 2012. It was formed by Nemuko Yamanaka and Kо̄hei Tanabe, but currently comprises Yamanaka and Kano. The duo have never released their faces, instead choosing to identify themselves through anime avatars.

== Background ==
Uchuu Nekoko was initially formed by Nemuko Yamanaka (vocals, guitar) and Kо̄hei Tanabe (bass). Their cover artwork is made by Tomoko Ōshima.

In 2014, they collaborated with Lovely Summer Chan, releasing in December Uchuu Nekoko and Lovely Summer Chan.

On 17 August 2016, they released their debut album Hibi no Awa (Japanese: 日々のあわ). Earlier in the year, on 20 July, they released a compilation of four remixes of their song Online Love (along with the song itself) in the form of Online Love -Remixes-. Between these releases, on 3 August, group released an EP titled Summer Sunny Blue EP (comprising four songs from Hibi no Awa).

On 2 August 2017, Kano announced they were joining the band as a vocalist. After Kano joined, Tanabe left the group.

On 9 August 2017, the single Night Cruising Love / parks was released.

On 24 May 2019, Uchuu Nekoko released Kimi No Youni Ikiretara (Japanese: 君のように生きれたら). It was named as an "essential release" by the Bandcamp Daily Staff, who connected the sound to My Bloody Valentine.

On 28 September 2021, the band released Hino Ataru Basyo Ni Kiteyo (Japanese: 日のあたる場所にきてよ).

== Discography ==
Albums

#	Title	Released in	Labels
1	Hibi no Awa	2014	P-Vine Records, LOOM Records
2	Kimi no Youni Ikiretara	2019	LOOM Records
3	Hino Ataru Basyo Ni Kiteyo	2021	LOOM Records

Singles and EPs

#	Title	Released in
1	Uchuu Nekoko and Lovely Summer Chan	2014
2	Online Love -Remixes-	2016
3	Summer Sunny Blue	2016
4	Night Cruising Love / parks	2017
5	flowing in the wind	2026
