= The Fauns =

British rock band

- Origin: Bristol, England
- Genres: Indie rock; shoegazing; dream pop
- Years active: 2007–present
- Labels: Invada; Laser Ghost Recordings
- Members: Alison Garner; Will Slater; Michael Savage; Guy Rhys-Davies
- Website: None

The Fauns are a British rock band that formed in 2007 in Bristol, England. The band consists of Alison Garner (vocals), Will Slater (guitar), Michael Savage (bass) and Guy Rhys-Davies (drums).

== History ==
The band released their self-titled debut album on their own label, Laser Ghost Recordings. Despite the lack of a publicity campaign, they received support from disc jockey Steve Lamacq and their debut sold more than 5000 copies by "word of mouth." The band released their follow-up album, Lights, produced by band member Michael Savage and engineered by Tim Allen and Get the Blessing bassist Jim Barr, on 2 December 2013, via Invada Records.

The band's song, "Fragile" was remixed by English composer Clint Mansell. The remix was eventually released as a limited edition single for Record Store Day.

The band opened for the French electronic music act College in 2013. They also toured with French post-rock/shoegaze band Alcest in early 2014 in Europe.

In October 2023, they released a new single, "How Lost", and then, in November 2023, "Mixtape Days," each from their forthcoming album How Lost.

== Members ==
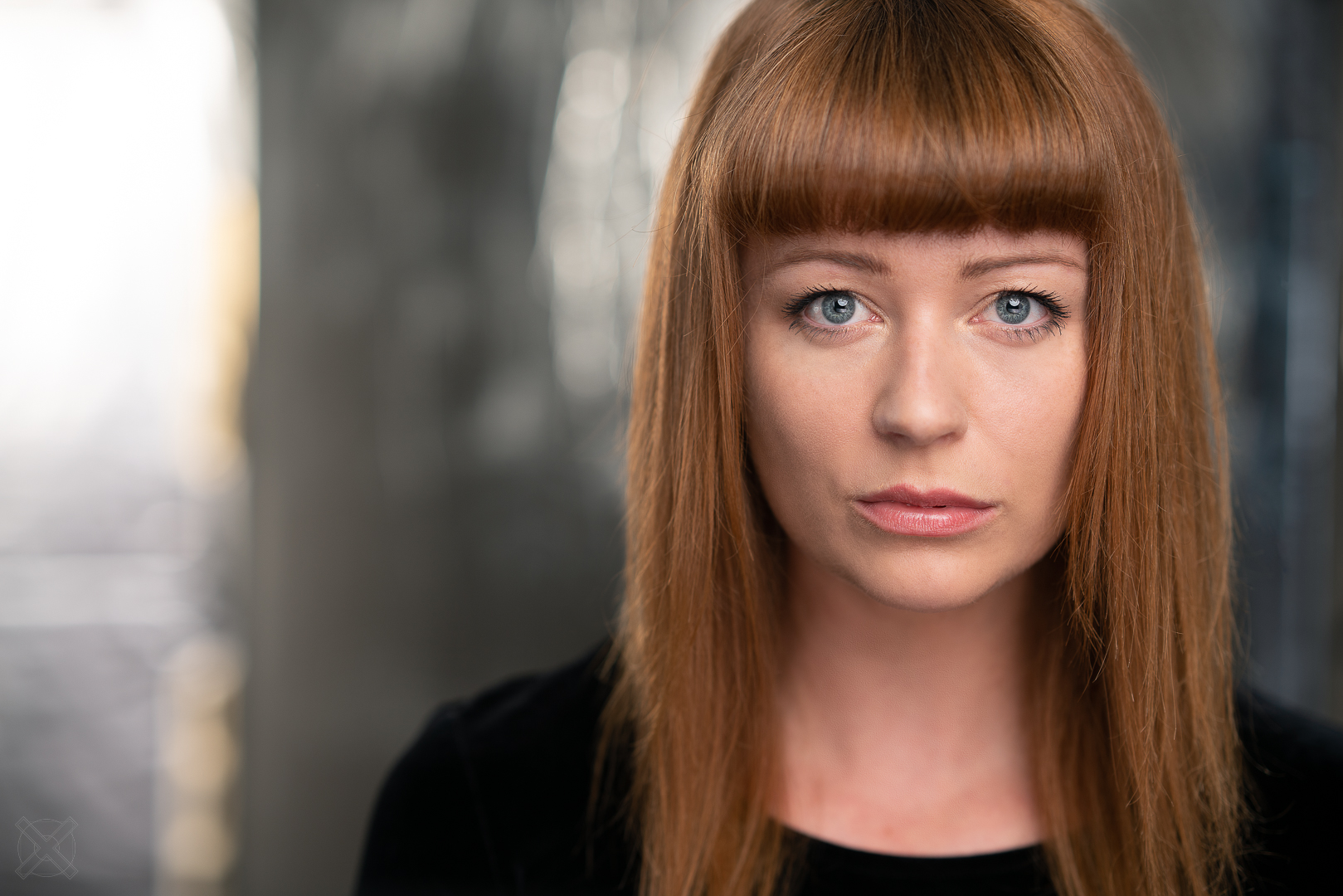
Alison Garner

- Alison Garner - Vocals
- Michael Savage - Bass
- Guy Rhys-Davies - Drums
- Will Slater - Guitars

Past Members

- Lee Woods -Guitar
- Elliot Guise -Guitar
- Tom Adams - Drums
- Kevin West - Guitar
- Olly Hares - Guitar
- Matthew O'Connor - Keys
- Martin Hommel - Bass

== Discography ==
Studio albums

- The Fauns (2009, Laser Ghost Recordings)
- Lights (2013, Invada Records)
- How Lost (2024, Invada Records)

Singles

- "Fragile Clint Mansell Mix" / "The Sun Is Cruising Redg Weeks Re-work" (Record Store Day 12" 2013, Invada Records)
- "Power Glove 'EP II' MINI-LP" features 4AM Power Glove Remix' (2015, Invada Records)

Music videos

- "Lovestruck" (2009, directed by Chris Lucas)
- "1991" (2010, directed by Chris Lucas)
- "Fragile Clint Mansell Mix" (2013, directed by Jonny Clooney)
- "Seven Hours" (2013, directed by John Minton)
- "Lights" (2013, directed by Chris Lucas)
- "4AM" (2014, directed by Tia Salisbury)
