= Lost Velvet =

- Origin: Reading, England, United Kingdom
- Genres: Alternative rock; post-rock; shoegaze
- Years active: 2024-present
- Members: Robert Butcher; Melissa Morris
- Website: https://lostvelvet.com

Lost Velvet are a British alternative rock / post-rock duo from Reading, England, formed in 2024. The band consists of multi-instrumentalist Robert Butcher and vocalist Melissa Morris. Their music blends cinematic textures, dual vocals and a ‘90s dream-scape aesthetic, drawing on shoegaze, post-rock and alternative rock influences.

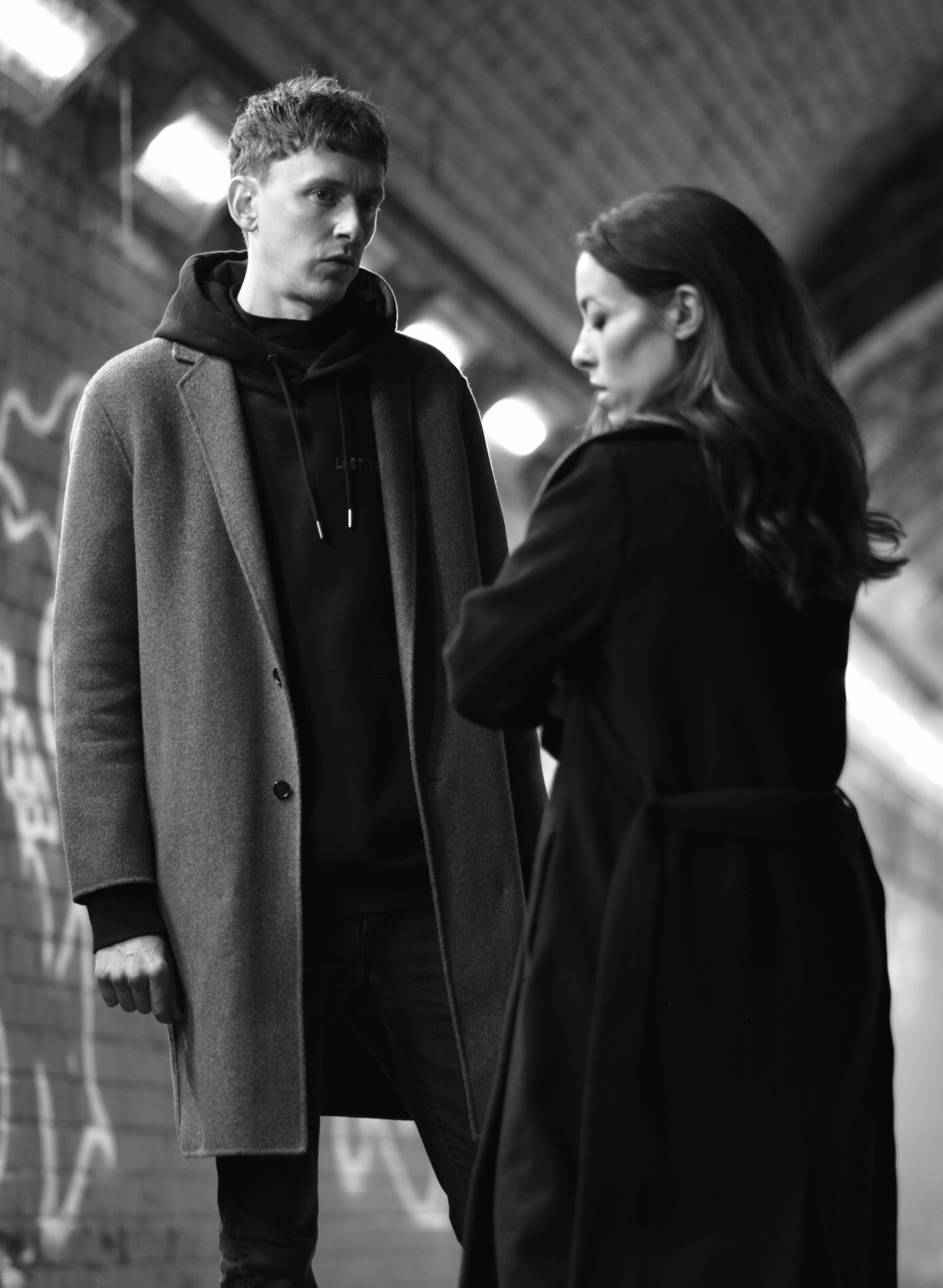
Lost Velvet photoshoot in Reading, 13.02.2025

== History ==
Lost Velvet first emerged in 2024 when Butcher and Morris began collaborating in Reading. Their debut single, “Endless”, was released in 2025 and received attention in several independent music publications, described as “a thoroughly consuming success… their knack for atmosphere-heavy, witching-hour rock intrigue is on full display”. The band's self-description declares: “Grunge, post-rock and pop collide in a haunting ’90s dreamscape”.

Later that year, they followed up with the singles “Wasted” and “Make It Alright”, and announced their debut album “Dark Cells’’ set for release in 2026.

In January 2026, the band released the album’s title track as a single. “Dark Cells” was mixed by Michael Patterson and mastered by Maor Appelbaum, and was reported by music publications as a stylistic shift toward a heavier and more expansive sound.

Throughout the remainder of 2026, the duo issued a succession of follow-up singles: “Burnt”, “Right Back” and “2003”, building momentum towards their debut full-length record. The 10-track self-produced album, also titled “Dark Cells”, was released on 4 September 2026. The record received positive critical reviews, with music publication P&L Tunes awarding it a 4 out of 5 rating and praising its atmospheric mix of shoegaze, post-rock and heavy guitar arrangements.

== Musical style and influences ==
Lost Velvet’s sound has been characterised as melding ambient, cinematic post-rock with the layered guitars and ethereal vocals of shoegaze. One reviewer wrote: “A sound fit for late-night drives… jangly mystique and dreamily enticing vocals …” Another noted that the band bridges the gap between atmospheric and aggressive alternative rock while retaining a moody nostalgic core.

On BBC Introducing in Oxfordshire and Berkshire, presenter Dave Gilyeat described the band’s sound as having a “Lynchian” atmospheric quality.

== Band members ==
- Robert Butcher – multi-instrumentalist, vocals
- Melissa Morris – vocals

== Discography ==
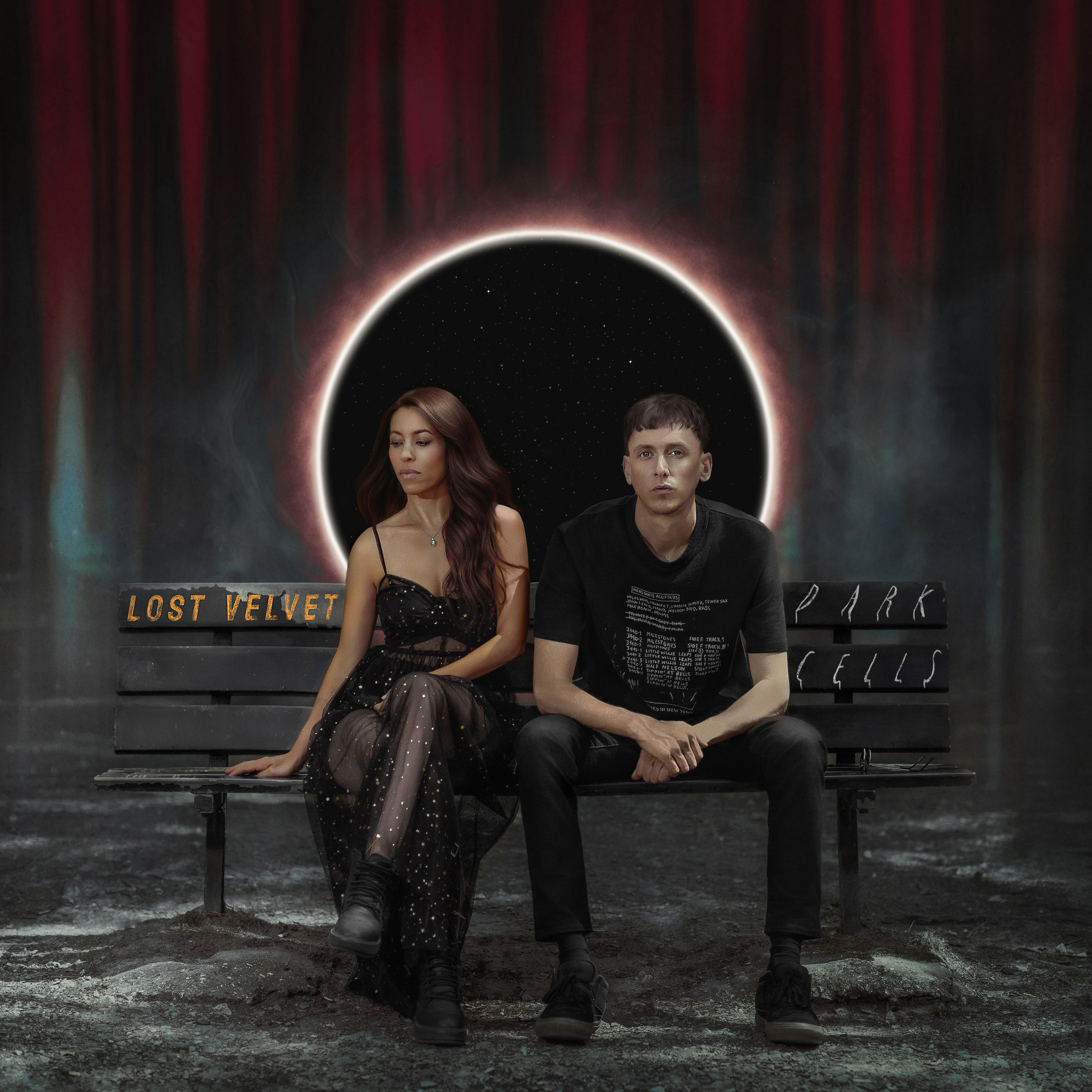
Lost Velvet "Dark Cells" cover art by Natalia d'Ark.

=== Singles & EPs ===
- Endless (single) – 2025
- Wasted (single) – 2025
- Make It Alright (single) – 2025
- Endless (EP) – 26 Sep 2025
- Dark Cells (single) – 2026
- Burnt (single) – 2026
- Right Back (single) – 2026
- 2003 (single) – 2026

=== Albums ===
- Dark Cells – 4 Sep 2026
