= White Violet (band) =

- Origin: Athens, Georgia, USA
- Genres: Indie rock Indie folk
- Years active: 2012-present
- Labels: Normal Town Records
- Members: Vaughan Lamb; Lemuel Hayes; Brad Morgan; Nate Nelson
- Past members: Brad Elliott; Josh McCauley
- Website: www.whiteviolet.com

White Violet is an indie rock band from Athens, Georgia, composed of Vaughan Lamb, Brad Morgan, Lemuel Hayes, and Nate Nelson. They released their debut album, Hiding, Mingling, in August 2012 with Normal Town Records.

== Discography ==
- Hiding, Mingling (2012)
