= Letting Up Despite Great Faults =

- Origin: Los Angeles, California, USA
- Genres: Indie rock, indiepop, dreampop, indietronica, shoegaze
- Years active: 2006–present
- Members: Mike Lee; Kent Zambrana; Daniel Schmidt; Annah Fisette
- Website: www.lettingup.com

Letting Up Despite Great Faults is an American indie pop/dream pop group, founded in 2006 by Los Angeles native Mike Lee, who currently resides with the rest of the band in Austin, TX. Pitchfork has dubbed them "shoegaze-y indie pop." Rolling Stone and Canada's Exclaim! have compared them to The Postal Service, while the consensus in the blogosphere has been more M83 and The Radio Dept. The name stems from Blonde Redhead's song "Loved Despite of Great Faults." One of their first songs, "Disasters Are Okay," appeared on the television show One Tree Hill. In 2011 their single "Teenage Tide" appeared on 90210. All songs are written and produced by Mike Lee.

== Discography ==
=== Albums ===
- Letting Up Despite Great Faults (October 13, 2009 US / April 14, 2010 Japan)
- Untogether (October 9, 2012 US / July 25, 2012 Japan)
- Neon (August 12, 2014 US / June 4, 2014 Japan)
- IV (March 4, 2022)

=== EPs ===
- Movement (August 15, 2006 / Re-released February 24, 2021)
- Paper Crush (August 2, 2011 US / October 24, 2011 UK & Europe)
- Japan Tour EP (October 10, 2012)
- Neon Japan Tour EP (August 6, 2014)
- Alexander Devotion (February 10, 2017 US, UK & Europe)

=== Singles ===
- Starlet (January 20, 2017)
- Pageantry (February 3, 2017)
- Keepsake (February 25, 2020)
- Call your girlfriend (April 23, 2021)

=== Remixes ===
- Passion Pit – "Little Secrets" (2009)
- Tape Deck Mountain - "On My Honor" (2009)
- MillionYoung - "Cynthia" (2010)
- Montauk - "Holiday" (2010)
- Silver Swans - "Secrets" (2010)

=== Other appearances ===
- You Be My Heart (December 2013)

== Film and TV ==
- "Teenage Tide" in 90210's episode Mama Can You Hear Me? (season 4, episode 14)
- "Disasters Are Okay" in One Tree Hill's episode Ashes of Dreams Let You Die (season 4, episode 19)
- "Shift" in Now Apocalypse's episode Where Is My Mind? (season 1, episode 2)

== Music videos ==
- "Teenage Tide" was directed by Chris Ewing and stars Milana Vayntrub
- "Details Of My World" was directed by Simón Brand and stars Siri Blomquist
- "Gemini" was directed by urzulka
- "Corners Pressed" was filmed by Mike Mangalindan
- "She Spins" was directed and edited by Vanessa Pla
