= The Away Days =

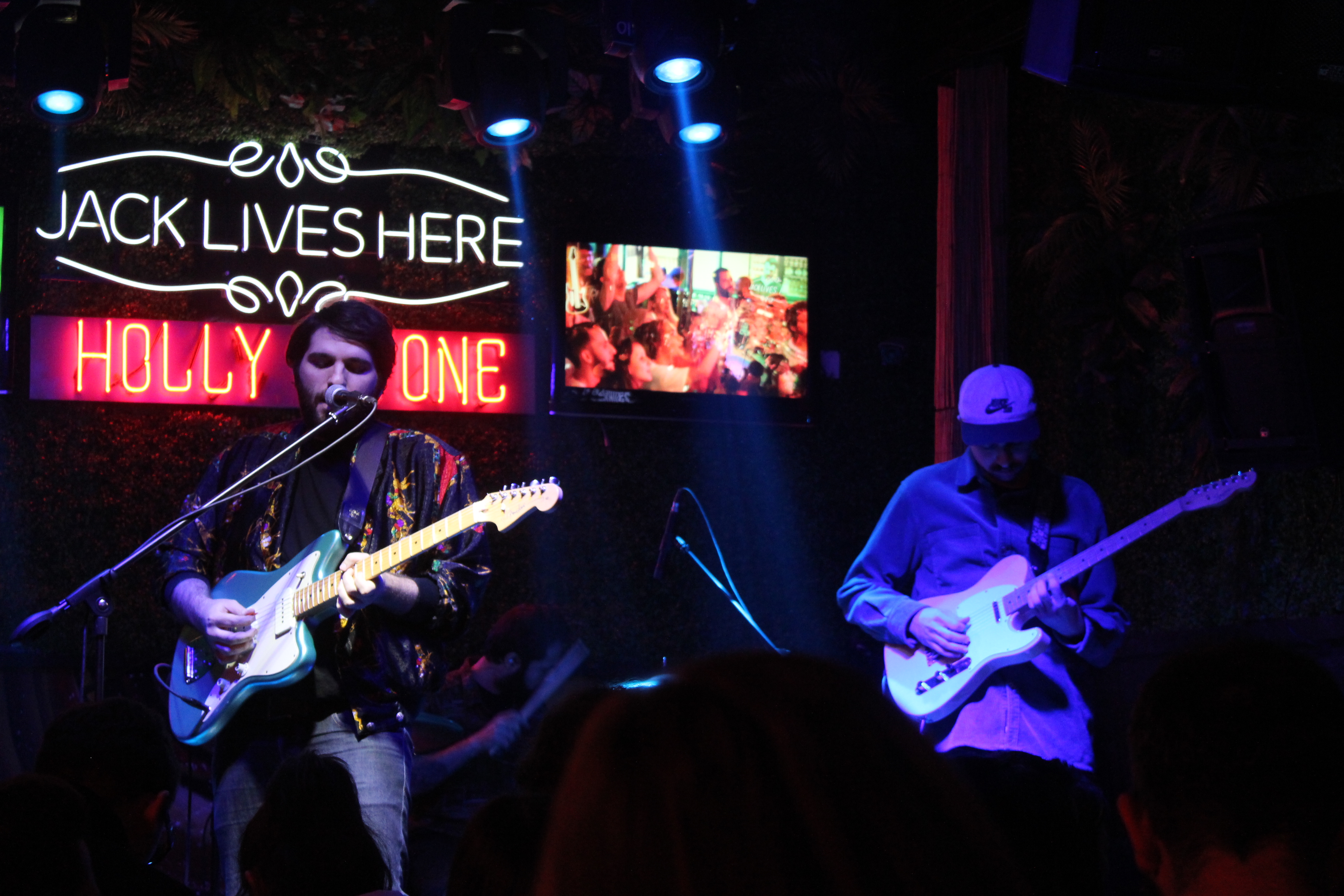

Background information
- Origin: Istanbul, Turkey
- Genres: Dream pop; shoegazing
- Years active: 2012–present
- Label: Unsigned
- Members: Oğuz Can Özen

The Away Days is a Turkish dream pop band formed in Istanbul, Turkey, in 2012 by Can Özen (vocals, guitar) and Sezer Koç (guitar, bas guitar), but the current line-up consists of Can Ozen and Orkun Atik.

== History ==
Formed in 2012 by Oğuz Can Özen and Sezer Koç, the band released their debut EP, How Did It All Start, independently in late 2012. Following year, the band released their first music video, "Galaxies", and performed at South by Southwest festival, attracting international attention. In addition, the band performed at The Great Escape Festival and toured United Kingdom. The band also opened for artists such as Portishead, Paul Banks and Owen Pallett.

In 2014, the band released the singles "Your Colour" and "Paris" with respective music videos. The music videos were premiered by Clash and Spin, respectively.

== Musical style ==
The band's musical style has been described as "dream pop" and "shoegazing." Clash magazine editor Robin Murray wrote that "the band's material matches the citrus-sharp songcraft of School of Seven Bells with the whirlwind drumming of early Ride," while also noting that "there's even a bit of Swervedriver's rock edge in there." Mischa Pearlman of The Guardian wrote: "Turkish shoegaze might not be a major phenomenon, but given the breadth of their [The Away Days'] talent, it soon could be." Zachary Lipez of Vice described the band's style as "a solid mix of 2006 Brooklyn, forever Flying Nun, and The La’s if they were mentored by the Reid brothers." The band's lyrics are sung entirely in English.

On the band's name, lead vocalist Oğuz Can Özen stated: " We called the band The Away Days, not because we feel we don’t belong to Istanbul or Turkey, but because we don’t feel like belonging anywhere. And maybe Istanbul didn’t have a great deal of influence to our music, but it has been a great home for us." On the influences, Özen further stated: "We [Özen and Koç] both listened to Selda and The Strokes when we were kids. But now, as we begin our twenties, we're trying to find some rare music influences through far east and India." He also listed Joy Division, The Stooges and The Smiths as personal influences.

== Members ==
Current members

- Can Özen

== Discography ==
Albums

- Dreamed at Dawn (2017)

EPs

- How Did It All Start (2012)
- THIS (2015)

Singles

- "Your Colour" (2014)
- "Paris" (2014)
- "Best Rebellious" (2014)
- "Paris (Portecho Remix)" (2014)
- "World Horizon" (2016)
- "Places to Go" (2016)
- "You Think You're High" (2018)
- "Designed" (2019)
- "Sadness Will Last Forever" (2020)

Music videos

- "Galaxies" (2013)
- "Your Colour" (2014)
- "Paris" (2014)
- "Sleep Well" (2014)
- "Best Rebellious" (2015)
- "Calm Your Eyes" (2015)
- "World Horizon" (2016)
- "White Whale" (2017)
- "Designed" (2019)
