= Palm Ghosts =

American rock band (2013–present)

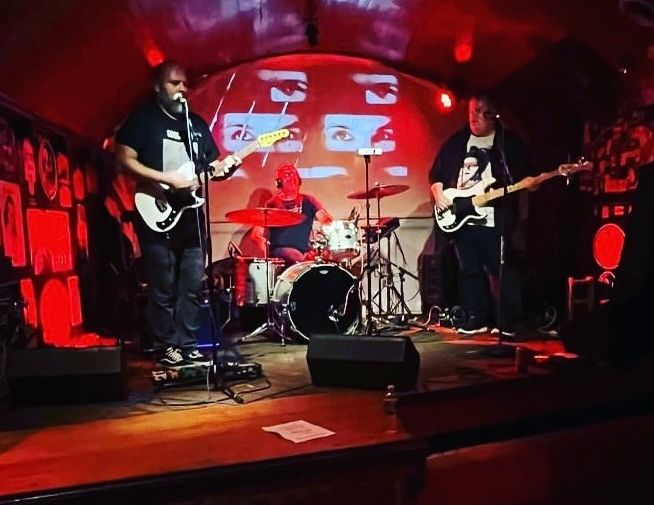
- Palm Ghosts playing at Kung Fu Necktie in Philadelphia on 3 March 2023; left to right: Benjamin Douglas, Walt Epting, Joseph Lekkas.

Background information
- Origin: Philadelphia, Pennsylvania; Nashville, Tennessee; United States
- Genres: Alternative rock, post-punk, indie rock, shoegaze, dream pop, indie folk
- Years active: 2013–present
- Labels: Surreal Sound Studios; Flour Sack Cape Nashville; Ice Queen; Golden Robot; Utopia Unearthed; Sweet Cheetah, Poptek; Sell The Heart; Engineer; Steadfast
- Members: Joseph Lekkas; Walt Epting; Benjamin Douglas
- Past members: Jim Becker; Alec Meltzer; Vince Tampio; Rene Lambert; Erika Wilkes; Jason Springman
- Website: www.palmghosts.net

Palm Ghosts is an American indie rock band formed in 2013 in Philadelphia, Pennsylvania. The band's music "offers a balanced blend of cinematic dream pop with dark indie rock." PopMatters said the band recalls "the long night of the soul sounds of Joy Division and Gang of Four" while sounding thoroughly contemporary "Palm Ghosts prove that the dead (inside) can indeed dance."

== History ==
=== Formation and early years (2013–2017) ===
Palm Ghosts was founded by singer-songwriter and record producer Joseph Lekkas, who had been formerly involved in various musical projects in the Philadelphia music scene, including Hilliard and Grammar Debate!

Following a personal transformation after battling a clinical anxiety disorder, Lekkas began writing songs that would later become the foundation for the band. Initially starting as a solo project, Lekkas handled all songwriting, recording, and production duties.

In 2014, Palm Ghosts independently released their self-titled debut album, which received positive reviews for its ethereal soundscapes and introspective songwriting. The album's mix of indie rock and folk was acclaimed as "elegant and sweeping pop" by the WXPN (88.5 FM) blog The Key.

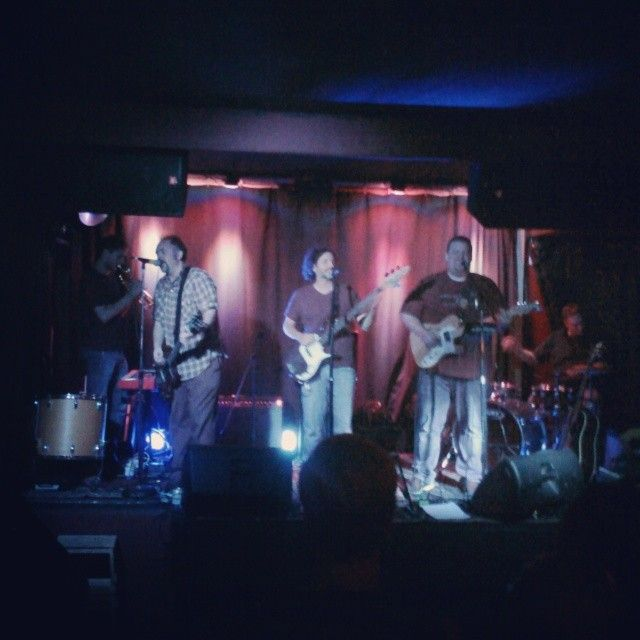
Palm Ghosts playing at Bourbon and Branch in Philadelphia in 2014; left to right: Vince Tampio, Jim Becker, Alec Meltzer, Joseph Lekkas, Walt Epting.

After the debut album release, following a short concert tour, Lekkas moved to Nashville to insert himself in the southern city's rich musical landscape. He began recording songs that became the album Greenland, adding songwriter and multi-instrumentalist Benjamin Douglas on guitar and keyboards and drummer Erin Nelson. Greenland was recorded and mixed in the spare bedroom of a rented house on Greenland Avenue in the Inglewood neighborhood of Nashville. The album expanded the indie folk sensibilities of the self-titled debut. Milwaukee Journal Sentinel said its sound "calls upon the jangle of R.E.M., the limpid folk of Simon & Garfunkel and lots of country and folk rock touchstones."

=== Expanding lineup and musical growth (2018–2023) ===
In 2018, Lekkas recruited new members and steered Palm Ghosts in a different musical direction with the release of Architecture. The album showcased the band's evolution and musical growth, "incorporating male and female vocals throughout, reminiscent of the caged drum sounds and keyboard and guitar duets found in the New Wave records of The Cure, XTC, and Peter Gabriel." England's Dancing About Architecture said the record was "a fantastic slice of all things that sit on the border of cultish and commercial, cool enough to appeal to the discerning tastes of the underground and hot enough to sell to the masses." Music News (UK) added "The commodified and codified 80's are here to stay, from the fake consciousness pop culture nostalgia that dominates the virtual shopping aisles to recreated and reimagined movie memories that manipulate and skew the present. Saddled with the past, culture's inertia offers up facsimile pop and Xerox rock. However, hope exists, listen as true light continues to glisten, appearing through the cracks and haunting the NOW are Nashville's Palm Ghosts."

In 2020, the COVID-19 pandemic impacted the band, causing a lineup reduction to a quartet and a pause in live performances. Vocalist Erica Wilkes and drummer Rene Lambert left, and original drummer Walt Epting rejoined the band.

Despite the setback, the band maintained creative momentum by trading files remotely, through email including iPhone 6-recorded drums, and pieced together their next album, Lifeboat Candidate. The album delved into themes of political and societal unrest, showcasing "a dense, unified and anthemic sound" with "biting shards of guitar, arpeggiated synths, and pulsating drums." The Associated Press praised the album's richness, textures, and evolution. The Nashville Scene said Lifeboat Candidate was "a superb soundscape: dance music for an age of chaos."

In late 2021, the band released The Lost Frequency, blending moody post-punk and dream pop into a sound that pays homage to legends like The Cure, Joy Division, and Echo and the Bunnymen while evoking modern imagery and addressing current topics. Milwaukee alternative newspaper The Shepherd Express said "The band simply does dark, brooding music well" Alt Revue proclaimed that the record was "Whimsical and playful lyrically, the band toys with juxtaposing themes of confrontation and calm. What emerges is a sound that has one foot firmly planted in the arena of their predecessors, while the other evokes modern imagery and exposes today's topics. Yes, you can listen to The Lost Frequency as a nostalgia trip with an ear thinking about some of the bands in the past. However, to do solely that does the Tennessee four-piece a great disservice. While they're not shy about their roots, they also are making music for the now. And we love it."

With the release of The Lost Frequency, the band embarked on a tour of the United States and their first trip to Canada, further solidifying their presence. In 2022, guitarist Jason Springman left the band due to tour fatigue, resulting in Palm Ghosts continuing as a trio with Lekkas, Douglas, and Epting.

In late 2022, the band released their sixth album, Post Preservation. Spin magazine described the album as embracing '80s influences, conjuring the soundtrack to a long-lost John Hughes film, and highlighted the band as a heat-seeking missile for early alternative rock fans. Ghettoblaster Magazine said the album "strikes a bit differently. What does that mean? Well, this time around it looks as if the group sees the light at the end of the proverbial tunnel. If they're ok with it, we should all be. But that doesn't mean the group has relinquished its cynicism."

In reviewing the band's late 2023 album, Ghettoblaster said: "Throughout the past decade, the band has honed its skill, combining a wide array of textures into post-punk riffing, wrapped around electronic tones. Through its seventh album, nothing has changed, save for its maturation. Through I Love You, Burn In Hell, the band moves in a number of ways, through songs working through the band's strengths. But in all honesty, there's nary a point of weakness". ... "Where does Palm Ghosts fall in the grand scheme of things? Well, considering its past few releases were strong, showing continual growth, the band's I Love You, Burn In Hell finds the group at its peak."

=== Year of Music and new release strategies (2024–present) ===
The band declared 2024 as their "Year of Music", during which they released 25 songs. The foundation was a series of 20 singles, one every two weeks. Each time five were released, once every 10 weeks, those became one pre-planned pre-named EP, and were re-released, in a series of four EPs, in order, named Escape, Masks, Channeling, and Decoder. Finally, once all 20 songs, in four EPs, were released, those became one pre-planned pre-named album, and were re-released as a double album named Façades, of which Your Tuesday Afternoon Alternative wrote "... Facades is a glorious, hypnotic propulsive attack of an album that makes you feel both like you're drifting through a dream and stumbling through the wreckage of something you can't quite recall." Synchronized one week after each of those four EPs, and fitting between them and after the last one, the band released four singles, all covers, one every 12 weeks, in order: Up the Down Escalator by The Chameleons, Don't Change by INXS, Losing My Religion by R.E.M., No Surprises by Radiohead, with all earnings donated in turn to one of four different charitable organizations. About mid-year, 9 August, between Masks and Channeling, the band released the second song in a split single, Shoulder Your Own / Fellow Immortalists, with Chris Broach of the band Braid. In support of the year, the band performed at 34 live events. At year's end, the band still had many pieces already sequenced, and mostly recorded, for later 2025 release.

On 10 October 2025, the band released the album Content Providers. WhiteLight//WhiteHeat terms the album "a thematic concept album addressing the struggles of artists in the modern music industry, particularly the demands of being a 'content provider' for algorithms and social media." Ghettoblaster Magazine said "With [the album], the band has found new ways to stir up emotions. ... it may not be something that's actually new, but it’s something much more deliberate and focused."

In 2026, the band released a monthly series of singles, some of which are socially reactive. Of January's God Help the Poor Billionaires, Ghettoblaster opined: "The result is a track that feels both timely and timeless: a commentary on greed, complicity, and the surreal normalization of inequality." Of March's Walk Into Your New Life, Atwood Magazine wrote: "Nashville's Palm Ghosts peel back the illusion of modern life on Walk Into Your New Life, a sharp, provocative indie rock jolt that turns the language of advertising into a haunting portrait of manipulation, control, and the uneasy search for something real beneath it all."

Palm Ghosts' music has been featured in television series including Netflix's 13 Reasons Why (2022), CBS's Clarice (2022), and Hulu's Tell Me Lies season 3 episode 4 (2026) with 2017's single Heavy Eyes. The band has played at Summerfest in Milwaukee, Wisconsin, the Mile of Music festival in Appleton, Wisconsin, and the Dark Spring festival in Boston, Massachusetts.

In late May 2026, Lekkas began volunteer programming, producing, and hosting a weekly one hour eclectic free-form music show named Golden Spiral Radio on Nashville's listener-supported broadcast community radio WXNA-LP 101.5 FM.

== Musical style and influences ==
The band's music is characterized by its dreamy and introspective qualities, combining elements of gothic rock, dream pop, post-punk, and shoegaze. Their sound features ethereal guitar textures, lush vocal harmonies, and atmospheric synthesizers. Lyrically, the band explores themes of personal introspection, love, loss, and the human condition.

The band cites various musical influences, including The Cure, Peter Gabriel, Echo and The Bunnymen, Joy Division & New Order, Japan, The Blue Nile, and Radiohead. These influences are evident in their music, which blends classic and contemporary elements to create a distinct sonic identity. Rock and Roll Globe says "this quartet is hardly another bro country group trying to own Music City USA. In fact, the only thing "Big Country" these folks are down with is the underrated post-modern rock band. The group echoes the sonic terrain of New Order, The Cure, Gene Loves Jezebel and John Carpenter soundtracks."

== Labels ==
The band has distributed music through several labels, including: Surreal Sound Studios (US, 2014), Flour Sack Cape Nashville (US, 2015–2017), Ice Queen Records (US, 2017–2023), Golden Robot Records (US, 2019–2020), Utopia Unearthed Records (US, 2023), Sweet Cheetah, Poptek (US, 2023), Sell The Heart Records (US, 2023), Engineer Records (UK, 2023), Steadfast Records (US, 2025).

== Members ==
=== Current members ===
- Joseph Lekkas – vocals, bass, guitar, keyboards, programming, production (2013–present)
- Walt Epting – drums, percussion (2013–2014, 2020–present)
- Benjamin Douglas – vocals, guitar, keyboards (2016–present)

=== Past members ===
- Jim Becker – guitar (2013–2014)
- Alec Meltzer – bass, keyboards (2013–2014)
- Vince Tampio – bass, guitar, trumpet (2013–2014)
- Rene Lambert – drums (2018–2020)
- Erika Wilkes – vocals (2018–2020)
- Jason Springman – vocals, guitar, keyboards, drums (2018–2022)

=== Guest members, collaborators ===
- Dan Storer – bass (2013)
- Alexander Yaker – keyboards (2013)
- Maura Dwyer – cello (2013–2014)
- Erin Nelson – drums (2016–2017)
- Sam Sharp – vocals (2017)
- James Moorehead – keyboards (2022)
- Anne McCue – vocals (2022–2023)

== Discography ==
=== Studio albums ===
- Palm Ghosts (2014)
- Greenland (2017)
- Architecture (2018)
- Lifeboat Candidate (2021)
- The Lost Frequency (2021)
- Post Preservation (2022)
- I Love You, Burn In Hell (2023)
- Façades (2024)
- Content Providers (2025)
- Love Factions (2026)

=== Studio EPs ===
- Wide Awake and Waiting (2020)
- Loop Arcade (2020)
- Dead Stars (2022)
- Cold Spells (2023)

=== Remix albums ===
- Deconstructed (2023)

=== Compilation albums ===
- Singles and B Sides (2022)
- Season for a Smile (2022)

=== Singles ===
- Heavy Eyes (2017)
- Fellow Immortalists (2024)
- God Help the Poor Billionaires (2026)
- Walk Into Your New Life (2026)
- A Limited Hang (2026)

==== Charity covers ====
- Up the Down Escalator (2024)
- Don't Change (2024)
- Losing My Religion (2024)
- No Surprises (2024)
