= Drugstore discography =

List of music by the rock band Drugstore

- Studio albums: 4
- Compilation albums: 2
- Singles: 21

The discography of London-based alternative rock band Drugstore consists of four studio albums, two compilation albums and 21 singles. Drugstore released their debut single "Alive" in 1993, and the same year they released the "Modern Pleasures" single. After various single released from 1994 to 1995, they released their debut self-titled album is 1995. The album peaked in the UK Albums Chart at number 31, the single "Fader", taken from the album, followed and went at number 70 in the UK Singles Chart. They released their second album White Magic for Lovers in 1998, which was a moderate success going to 45 in the UK Albums Chart, and it landed them the top 20 single "El President". The single "Sober" followed and went at number 68. In 2000 they released the single "Dry", and the year after they released their third album Songs for the Jet Set, however they went on a hiatus so little promotion was done. After an eight-year hiatus, they reformed and released their fourth album Anatomy in 2011 through Rocket Girl. In September they released the Best of Drugstore album, and are working on a fifth album with a working title of A Stroll Beyond the Cave and Into the Light, planned to be released in 2014.

== Albums ==
=== Studio albums ===
Year	Album details	Peak chart positions
Year	Album details	UK
1995	Drugstore: Released: April 1995; Label: Go! Discs; Formats: CD, Vinyl	31
1998	White Magic for Lovers: Released: May 1998; Label: Roadrunner Records; Formats: CD, cassette, Vinyl	45
2001	Songs for the Jet Set: Released: 26 February 2001; Label: Global Warming; Formats: CD	—
2011	Anatomy: Released: 8 August 2011; Label: Rocket Girl; Formats: CD, Vinyl, digital download	—

=== Compilation albums ===
- Collector Number One (2002)
- Best of Drugstore (2013)

== Singles ==
1993

- "Alive"
- "Modern Pleasures"

1994

- "Starcrossed" (UK Singles Chart #105)
- "Driving" (fan club single)

1995

- "Nectarine" (UK Singles Chart #86)
- "Solitary Party Groover" (UK Singles Chart #92)
- "Fader" (UK Singles Chart #72)
- "Injection" (UK Singles Chart #77)
- "Xmas at the Drugstore" (fan club single)

1996

- "Mondo Cane" (UK Singles Chart #83)

1998

- "El President" (UK Singles Chart #20)
- "Sober" (UK Singles Chart #68)
- "Say Hello"

2000

- "Dry"
- "I Wanna Love You Like a Man"

2001

- "Song for the Lonely"
- "Baby Don't Hurt Yourself"

2011

- "Sweet Chili Girl/Clouds"
- "Standing Still"

2012

- "Aquamarine"
