= Popular Mechanics (album) =

Studio album by Piano Magic
- Released: November 1997
- Genre: Post-rock
- Length: 51:01
- Label: i/Che
- Producer: Piano Magic

Piano Magic chronology
Popular Mechanics (1997)	A Trick of the Sea (1998)

Professional ratings
Review scores
Source	Rating
AllMusic	3/5 stars
BBC Music	(favourable)
Melody Maker	(favourable)
Vox	4/5 stars
Alternative Press	4/5 stars
The Wire	(favourable)

Popular Mechanics is the debut album by English experimental rock band Piano Magic. It was originally released in 1997 on I/Ché Trading records and then again by Rocket Girl in 2003.

It was recorded in North London by founding members Glen Johnson and Dominic Chennell with contributions from passing friends. At the time, Johnson and Chennell claimed the album to be influenced by the early music of Kraftwerk and Brothers Quay animation films.

== Reception ==
The album was favourably received by both home and international press. David Hemingway's review in The Wire sums up with "Few other releases occupy this fertile middle ground between ambience and experimentation, between pop and abstraction, and none I know succeeds with such effortless finesse. Highly recommended". While Mark Luffman's review in Melody Maker concludes with (in a nod to the lyrics of Wintersort/Cross Country) "Things simply couldn't be finer."

Ngaire-Ruth's review in Vox magazine goes further and claims the album "significantly redefined our means of cultural expression."

=== Opponents ===
While a definite outlier, Angela Lewis in The Independent newspaper is less enthusiastic finding the band's "moody obscurity ... for the art-school crowd and physics students only."

== Recording ==
The album was recorded in their shared North London home by founding members Glen Johnson and Dominic Chennell with contributions from passing friends. An 8 track cassette machine was borrowed from band Urusei Yatsura to make the album recordings.

== Music ==
At the time, Johnson and Chennell claimed the album to be influenced by the early music of Kraftwerk and Brothers Quay animation films and was described by record label Rocket Girl as 'minimalist mood music with whirring keyboards, small beats and the effective deployment of brittle, doll-like voices.". This was reflected by The Wire magazine who reported the music as "ethereal electronic pop and atmospheric soundscapes" and as the band themselves calling it "pre-chip .. radiophonic".

There is evidence of field recordings or 'found sounds' throughout including dripping taps, bird song and ticking clocks.

The album includes the a-sides from Piano Magic's first two single releases, Wrong French and Wintersport featuring the third founding member Dick Rance.

== Sleeve ==
The album front cover shows a grassy bank in front of an anonymous modern building. The reverse cover and internal booklet (CD) and inner sleeve (vinyl) appear to show intimate household details including a kitchen tap; a flaking wall; a knife and spoon (CD only) in high contrast colours.

Dominic Chennell is credited with 'photography'. Lyrics are included in both vinyl and CD editions with Glen Johnson credited with "words".

== Track listing ==
=== Vinyl edition ===
Side 1: A
No.	Title	Length
1.	"Metal Coffee"	1:29
2.	"Wintersport / Cross Country"	8:32
3.	"Everything Works Beautifully"	2:26
4.	"(0:53)"	0:53
5.	"Amongst Russian Lathes & Metal Curls"	4:09
6.	"Birth of an Object"	2:16
Total length:		19:45

Side 2: B
No.	Title	Length
1.	"Revolving Moth Cage"	4:05
2.	"To Be Swished / Dream of the UPS Driver"	9:00
3.	"Freckled Robot"	2:52
4.	"Soft Magnets"	4:57
5.	"Wrong French"	5:36
6.	"You've Lost Your Footing in This World"	4:33
Total length:		27:44

=== CD edition ===
No.	Title	Length
1.	"Metal Coffee"	1:30
2.	"Wintersport / Cross Country"	8:34
3.	"Everything Works Beautifully"	2:27
4.	"(0:53)"	0:53
5.	"Amongst Russian Lathes & Metal Curls"	4:10
6.	"Birth of an Object"	2:16
7.	"Revolving Moth Cage"	4:07
8.	"To Be Swished / Dream of the UPS Driver"	9:02
9.	"Freckled Robot"	3:28
10.	"Soft Magnets"	5:01
11.	"Wrong French"	5:36
12.	"You've Lost Your Footing in This World"	4:33

== Lineup ==
- Glen Johnson – Sounds / Words
- Dominic Chennell – Sounds / Photography
- Martin Cooper – Sounds
- David Griffiths – Sounds
- Dick Rance – Sounds
- Paul Tornbohm – Sounds
- Hazel Burfitt – Voice
- Rachel Leigh – Voice
