= Drugstore (disambiguation) =

A drugstore is an American term for a shop featuring a pharmacy. It may also refer to:

- Drugstore (band), a British-based pop rock trio
  - Drugstore (album), the 1995 debut album recorded by the band Drugstore
- "Drugstore", a 1998 song by Stabbing Westward from Darkest Days
- drugstore.com, a United States-based website in operation from 1999 to 2016
- Drugstore beetle, an insect with a reputation for eating pharmacy products
