= Randall Nieman =

American musician and entrepreneur

Randall Nieman is an American musician and entrepreneur. In addition to being a guitarist and percussionist in several bands, he has played a variety of exotic instruments, including the theremin.

Nieman departed the post-rock band Windy & Carl to form Füxa in 1995. He has since collaborated with several artists and outfits including Stereolab, Add N to (X), Piano Magic, The Telescopes and Kid Rock.

In 1998, Ryan Anderson departed Füxa, with Nieman turning the outfit into a solo act.
