= Vonneumann =

vonneumann
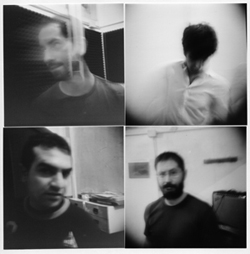
- vonneumann

Background information
- Origin: Rome, Italy
- Genres: Experimental rock Post-rock
- Years active: 1999–present
- Labels: Ammiratore Omonimo Records; Ebria Records; Homemade Avantgarde; Freeland Recordings.
- Website: vonneumann.net

Vonneumann (stylized as vonneumann and abbreviated as nn) is an experimental/post-rock band from Rome, Italy. The band is named after mathematician Johann von Neumann.

== History ==
Vonneumann formed in 1999 as the successor to the members' previous band, Arborio. Arborio was active from 1992 until it disbanded in 1998. They reformed the next year under the name Vonneumann; the decision to change the name was to reflect their changed direction. As Arborio had developed a tight math-rock style, its members decided to try a new approach based on improvisation.

In 2000, Vonneumann released their debut album l'invariante.tmp (self-produced, Ammiratore Omonimo Records) receiving positive reviews from the Italian underground magazines and e-magazines, notably from Blow Up.

The following year, the band recorded and released a short EP titled pulcino angolare [o plurale - EP]. That same year, they signed with Freeland Records and in 2002 released jaser/lægo, the band's first release that wasn't self-produced. That same year, Blow Up dedicated an article to the international free-rock scene, associating Vonneumann with bands such as Boards of Canada, Dntel, Piano Magic, Slicker and Velma. Consequently, the band toured across Italy.

In the following years, Vonneumann was involved in soundtracks for local theatre shows, working mainly with Francesca Staasch.

In 2006, Vonneumann released their third full-length, switch parmenide, a concept album based on Zeno's paradoxes and skateboarding. The album was well received by the underground press, but got little distribution due to limited resources of their label, Homemade Avantgarde. No gigs were ever played of the album.

Following switch parmenide, Vonneumann began work on two twin albums, one of pure improvisation and one of purely written music. This is a deep change in the composition modality, as all the previous works were always a combination of the two elements. In order to mark this change, vonneumann also decides not to record in house the "written" album, but to go professional. The summer of 2007 was devoted to the recording of il de' blues, currently unreleased. The album was recorded by Ivan Rossi and mastered by Giovanni Versari, from the Nautilus studio.

At the same time, vonneumann mixed and mastered by itself the "improvised" album il de' metallo and, after signing with Ebria Records, it was then released early 2009. il de' metallo was reviewed extremely well by major Italian magazines and was rated album #2 of the month by Blow Up.

After a long break, vonneumann is now working on a new concept album.

== Discography ==
- l'invariante.tmp [2000]
- pulcino angolare [o plurale - EP] [2001]
- jaser/lægo [2002]
- switch parmenide [2006]
- il de' metallo [2009]
- il de' blues [2014]
- Sitcom Koan (Live) [2016]
- NorN [2017]
