= Pluxemburg =

Swedish record label

- Founded: 2000
- Founder: Jonas Sevenius, Adam Kammerland, Anders Ekert, Björn Carlberg, Sebastian Tesch, Peter Ström, Martin Ström
- Genre: Electronic music
- Country of origin: Sweden
- Location: Stockholm
- Official website: http://www.pluxemburg.com/

Pluxemburg is an Independent record label based in Stockholm, Sweden. Founded in 2000 by the members of Pluxus, the former head of Slowball Records Jonas Sevenius and brothers Peter Ström and Martin Ström, the label has released records of Pluxus, Andreas Tilliander, Fibes, Oh Fibes! and Jeans Team.

In 2004 Andreas Tilliander was awarded Best Dance/Club Album for his album World Industries at the Grammis Awards after being nominated both 2002 and 2003. The album also rendered two Manifest (The Swedish Independent Record Producers) Awards for Best Post Rock/Electronica and Best Dance/House/Techno.

The first version of the Pluxemburg website, designed by Peter Ström and Martin Ström was awarded Excellent Swedish Design in 2001.

Pluxemburg has been releasing several Jeans Team records in Scandinavia. In 2008 the Pluxus album Solid State was rereleased by Kompakt.

== Selected discography ==
- Andreas Tilliander - World Industries (CD & LP)
- Fibes, Oh Fibes! - Still Fresh (CD)
- Fibes, Oh Fibes! - Emotional (CD)
- Jeans Team - Gold Und Silber (CDEP)
- Jeans Team - Musik von oben (CD)
- Pluxus - Och Resan Fortsätter Här… (CD & LP)
- Pluxus - European Onion (CD)
- Pluxus - Solid State (CD)
