= State River Widening =

London-based music trio

- Origin: London, England
- Genres: Electronica, ambient, folk
- Instruments: Acoustic guitar, drums, keyboards, electronics
- Labels: Rocket Girl; Vertical Form; The Leaf Label
- Members: Keiron Phelan; David Sheppard; Jon Steele
- Website: Official website

State River Widening are a London-based musical trio, formed in May 1998, comprising multi-instrumentalists David Sheppard and Keiron Phelan, along with drummer/percussionist Jon Steele. They are named after the title of a Chinese propaganda photo.

== History ==
Friends from school (in south London) Sheppard and Phelan began experimental recordings in 1996, soon hooking up with percussionist Steele to leaven their intertwining, Nick Drake-like acoustic guitars with vigorous yet dexterous drumming.

The band's debut single, "Unsung Couples", was released on the Gold Hole label in November 1998. SRW's hypnotic cycles of avant-rock melody connected with an audience then thrilling to similarly inclined practitioners such as Godspeed You! Black Emperor and Tortoise. Further singles and compilation tracks appeared before the November 1999 release of SRW's eponymous debut (on rising independent imprint Rocket Girl), drawing plaudits from Delusions of Adequacy, who observed that the band's "intoxicating back-to-nature acoustic explorations supplied the Anglo-agrarian answer to Chicago's urbanite post-rock crowd". A clutch of rare live dates followed, the band performing with, amongst others, Low and Piano Magic.

Summer 2000 saw the release of the single "Desertesque (For Hessen)" / "Radio Valkyrie", on the German label Beau Rivage. Eighteen months of work then followed on the second album, Early Music, which expanded SRW's palette using a vivid miscellany of instruments. Released in spring 2003, the album proved another critical success, with several Early Music tracks finding their way onto TV documentary and advertising soundtracks.

Recorded between late 2003 and spring 2004, the album Cottonhead was released at the end of October 2004 on a new label, Vertical Form. With strings, additional percussion and, on one track, the voice of reclusive 1960s folk singer Anne Briggs, Cottonhead was SRW's most artistically ambitious and sophisticated record to date. In 2005, Phelan and Sheppard signed (under their own names) to The Leaf Label and at the end of the year began work on a new album, with ex-Laika mainstay Guy Fixsen assisting. That album, Harps Old Master, was released in September 2006.
