= Pulpo =

Pulpo is the Spanish word for "octopus". It may also refer to:

== Nickname ==
- Antonio Alfonseca (born 1972), Dominican former Major League Baseball relief pitcher nicknamed "El Pulpo"
- Gilberto "Pulpo" Colón Jr. (born 1953), American pianist, composer, arranger, producer and band leader
- Norberto Esbrez (1966–2014), Argentine tango dancer, choreographer and teacher nicknamed "El Pulpo"
- José Luis Quiñónez (born 1984), Ecuadorian footballer nicknamed "El Pulpo"
- Emmanuel Rivera (born 1996), Puerto Rican Major League Baseball third baseman nicknamed "El Pulpo"
- Pulpo Romero (born 1984), Spanish football goalkeeper
- Martín Zúñiga (born 1970), Mexican soccer analyst, sports anchor and former Major League Soccer goalkeeper nicknamed "El Pulpo"
- Eduardo Simián (1915–1995), Chilean politician and football goalkeeper, nicknamed "Pulpo" during his playing career

== Other uses ==
- USS PC-465, a U.S. Navy submarine chaser transferred to the Argentine Navy and renamed ARA Pulpo
- ¡Pulpo!, a 1997 album by Glaswegian lo-fi rock indie band Urusei Yatsura
- Los pulpos, a 1948 Argentine film by Carlos Hugo Christensen
- United Fruit Company, an American corporation sometimes called "el pulpo"
