= Son de Mar =

Son de Mar refers to:

- Son de Mar is a Spanish film
- Son de Mar (soundtrack) is the soundtrack to the Spanish film by the same name.
