= Ger FitzGerald =

Ger FitzGerald may refer to:

- Ger FitzGerald (musician) (born 1970), musician and music industry executive
- Ger FitzGerald (hurler) (1964–2025), Irish hurling manager and player
