= Coldharbourstores =

British experimental ambient pop band

- Origin: London UK
- Genres: Ambient Pop / Dream Pop
- Years active: 1999-Present
- Label: Rocketgirl Records Fire Records Enraptured Records
- Members: Lucy Castro, David Read, Michael McCabe, Liam Greany
- Past members: Daniel Bowling, Samuel R. Laws
- Website: https://www.coldharbourstores.com

Coldharbourstores are a British experimental ambient pop band.

== History ==
Original members David Read and Michael McCabe formed Coldharbourstores in 1998 with original singer Daniel Bowling and drummer Samuel R. Laws. The band, which now includes singer Lucy Castro and drummer Liam Greany, has released singles, albums and collaborative works across various labels including Rocketgirl, Enraptured and Fire Records. Their first album, More Than The Other, was released on the Rocketgirl label in 2002.

They have worked with musicians and producers such as Graham Sutton, Bark Psychosis, Fuxa and American author Scott Heim.

The band has twice musically interpreted the poems of James Joyce, in 2008 as part of the Chamber Music: James Joyce (1907). 1-36. album for Fire Records, and again in 2017 for the online project Waywords and Meansigns Opendoor Edition setting James Joyce's Finnegans Wake to music.

Their third album, Wilderness, was released in 2017 by Enraptured Records. It received a Metacritic score of 77 from 100 based on four reviews indicating generally favourable reviews. The record sleeve, designed by Martin Andersen, was included in "Pop Music 1967-2017. Graphics and Music" at Echirolles Centre Du Graphisme, France, an exhibition to celebrate the most iconic record sleeves (1967–2018). The exhibition re-opened in Paris in June 2018.

A new studio album, 'Vesta', was released in 2019 by Enraptured Records.

'Dearly Devoted', the band’s fourth album, again produced by Graham Sutton was released in November 2020. The album was preceded by first single 'Z E R O', and was followed by second single 'Big Deal'.

A 500 copy limited-edition album 'Coldharbourstores Remixed' was released for Record Store Day 2022, featuring remixes of songs from Vesta and Dearly Devoted, by Pete 'Bassman' Bain (Spacemen 3), Windy & Carl, Gabe Knox, Yellow6, L-Shape, Hyper Ex-Machina & L-Shape/CHS.

Between November 2024 – February 2025, four of the band’s album sleeves designed by Martin Andersen, were selected and showcased at The Rock Pop Underground exhibition, an international graphic design festival in Hungary, GraphicPécs, celebrating the history and influence of rock, pop, and underground graphic design from 1950 to present day.

== Select discography ==
- More Than The Other (2002)
- Chamber Music: James Joyce (1907). 1-36. (2008)
- Wilderness (2017)
- Vesta (2019)
- Dearly Devoted (2020)
- Coldharbourstores Remixed (2022)
