= Rocket Girl =

English independent record label

- Industry: Music and entertainment
- Genre: Experimental, alternative rock, electronic, psychedelic
- Headquarters: London, United Kingdom
- Owner: Vinita Joshi (1997–present)
- Website: rocketgirl.co.uk

Rocket Girl is a London-based independent record label. It has released records by Robin Guthrie, Pieter Nooten, God Is an Astronaut, Ulrich Schnauss, A Place to Bury Strangers, Bell Gardens among others, including many artists associated with ambient music.

== History ==
Before launching Rocket Girl in 1997, Vinita Joshi had been actively involved in running both Cheree Records and Ché Trading, releasing tracks by artists such as The Telescopes, The Tindersticks, Bark Psychosis and Disco Inferno. Ché Trading, an offshoot label co-founded by Joshi and Nick Allport, was responsible for releasing the music of Essex Etherealists, Disco Inferno, and had a roster that also included the Tindersticks, Backwater, Füxa and Slipstream. Ché Trading had two Top 40 hit singles by Lilys ("A Nanny In Manhattan") and Urusei Yatsura ("Hello Tiger"). Joshi has also been involved with a number of other record labels throughout the years, namely Bella Union and One Little Indian.

=== Launch ===
In 1997, Rocket Girl's first release was a split single by the band Silver Apples ("I have known Love") and Windy & Carl ("Fractal Flow"). The label continued to grow with a diverse roster and encouraged cross-pollination between its artists, most notably the 1998 7" single collaboration between Low, Transient Waves and Piano Magic ("Sleep at the Bottom"). Hot on the heels of the Silver Apples & Windy & Carl's 7", 1998 also saw the release of Rocket Girl's first full-length album, A Tribute to Spacemen 3, which was a celebration of the pioneers of drone, with offerings from Bowery Electric, Mogwai, Arab Strap, Piano Magic and Low, among others. In 2000, Rocket Girl released the EP Add N to Fu(x)a. Just four years after its launch, Rocket Girl was credited for the launch of "intriguing lo-fi classics". Late in 2010 the label signed the London-based band Drugstore.

=== Awards ===
In 2001, Rocket Girl enjoyed television exposure being the focus of an entire episode of the BBC series Hit & Miss – An A-Z of the music industry. In the same year, the label won a Young Music Professional Award. In August 2013, the Association of Independent Music nominated Rocket Girl for the 'Best Small Label' award.

=== Offshoot labels ===
Rocket Girl has established a number of offshoot labels, including Indus Sonica, which reissued Piano Magic's seminal debut Popular Mechanics, and Mandita. Both labels remain under the Rocket Girl banner.

=== Partial list of artists ===
Artist	Description
	A Place to Bury Strangers (APTBS) is a New York–based noise rock band that was formed in 2011 and composed of Oliver Ackermann (guitar/vocals), Dion Lunadon (bass guitar) and Robi Gonzalez (drums). The industry describes APTBS as the loudest band in New York. They are suggested to borrow influence of the UK's 1980s indie rock scene and glimmer with nods from early material by The Cure and My Bloody Valentine, specifically with reference to the atmosphere of those recordings rather than just aping their style. The songs are finely fashioned with an eclectic set of hooks and baselines.
Add N to (x)	A collaboration between Barry Smith from Add N To (X) and Randall Nieman from Füxa.
Azusa Plane	The Azusa Plane was the psychedelic music recording and performance project of Jason DiEmilio (1970 – 2006). DiEmilio performed primarily on a Fender guitar and usually through echo effects. The industry suggested that there is a great deal of beauty in this music, some of it close to an ‘accepted’ standard for that abused noun.
Coldharbourstores	Formed in 1998 this London-based band consists of Lucy Castro, David Read, Michael McCabe, Graham Sutton & Liam Greany. Their music is described as a 'hypnotic acoustic ambiance'.
Drugstore	The band was formed in 1993 by Monteiro, Robinson and Chylinski. Drugstore's music has been featured on four film soundtracks : "Superglider", from the album Drugstore, is used on "All Over Me" and "House of America", both released in 1997; "Fader", also from Drugstore, is featured on the credits of the 2000 film Cherry Falls; "Old Shoes", originally written and performed by Tom Waits from the album Step Right Up: The Songs of Tom Waits, is used in the 2004 film East of Sunset. The band's music was also featured throughout the BBC series This Life, whose music producer was Ricky Gervais.
	Eat Lights Become Lights (ELBL) was formed in London in the winter of 2007 by Neil Rudd and fits within the Krautrock genre. Eat Lights Become Lights have repackaged krautrock for a new audience without compromising on the long-standing musical codes and conventions. The name "Eat Lights Become Lights" was intended to be something memorable, but not the one word band name, which Rudd suggested was commonplace in the industry. It is suggested to be a "mantra" or "statement" that alludes to something "nebulous" and offers audiences an anchor point from which to explore the sound. The trademark Eat Lights Become Lights sound owes much to Neil's love of German avant-garde progressive rock and electronic music of the 1970s, which some suggest is not just "pastiche" or "homage", but rather a "soulful extension" conveyed through a concoction of motorik grooves, overpowering noise, and then balanced with a uniqueness that indicates most clearly the brands "burgeoning potential". The sound sample opposite shows how Neil uses analogue and software synths alongside traditional guitar, bass and drums to construct an ever-evolving synthetic landscape of harmony and melody, feedback and drones but always underpinned with driving, insistent motorik percussion. ELBL's sounds are finely fashioned with an eclectic set of hooks and baselines.
Experimental Audio Research	Experimental Audio Research (commonly shortened to E.A.R. or EAR) is a psychedelic / drone project formed in 1990 by Peter Kember (a.k.a. Sonic Boom), formerly of Spacemen 3. Their approach is underlined with an ere of experimentation.
	Füxa (pronounced Fyoo-sha, or like the color fuchsia) was created in 1994 and consists of Detroit musicians Ryan Anderson (formerly of Asha Vida and later to join DELTA WAVES) and Randall Nieman. Füxa focus on a lo-fi, electronics-heavy blend of droning, treated guitars, vintage synths, and sparse percussion in the vein of suicide. Their fast ascension into cult status is the result of their experimental approach to their work.
Frausdots	Frausdots is a band from Los Angeles, California, United States. The band consists of Brent Rademaker, formerly of The Tyde and Beachwood Sparks, and Michelle Loiselle, a former backing singer for Guns N' Roses, Carl Tapia, Roger Brogan, Exiquio Talavera and David Baum.
Gnac	GNAC (pronounced niak, as in the last syllable of cognac). The name gnac is a pseudonym used by songwriter and music producer Mark Tranmer. The name is derived from a short story by Italo Calvino in Marcovaldo entitled Luna e GNAC (or ""moon and gnac""). Since the story refers to a cognac factory it is reasonable to pronounce it 'niyak' but some people say 'guh-nac' and the odd person says 'gee-nac'.
	God is an Astronaut (GIAA) are a five piece band from Glen of the Downs, Ireland. The band was formed by twin brothers Niels and Torsten Kinsella in 2002. Their album, titled "The End Of The Beginning" was intended to be a farewell to the industry. Many now consider GIAA as of the world's biggest instrumental bands. In mid-2006 a licensing deal with U.K. label Rocket Girl saw both their E.P. and second album "All Is Violent, All Is Bright" being re-released.
Jon DeRosa	Jon DeRosa (born 21 December 1978) is a guitarist, composer and singer/songwriter from Brooklyn, New York. His work contains a mix of influences and is quite simply: sophisticatic pop music.
Pieter Nooten	Pieter Nooten composes all of his music solely on a MacBook Pro. But the power of Nooten's machine is not to be underestimated, and neither should his talent as a composer. Nooten's aesthetic is rooted loosely in a minimalistic compositional technique with the detailed production and unexpected musical depth enveloping the melancholia in a comforting shroud. Pieter Nooten increases the level of musical involvement during his live performances by the images processed by Miryam Chachmany, an emerging talented video maker whose works are currently on display in galleries in Miami, New York City, New Mexico and also in an important upcoming art-festival in Amsterdam. The music is created and mixed using the Mac Book Pro, the only equipment chosen by the musician. Pieter's music is suggested to create emotion, highlighting harmonic areas mainly directed towards nostalgia and reflection through elements of elegant piano-violin orchestrations, piano sound with keyboard elements.
Robin Guthrie	Guthrie's more recent releases Emeralds is, according to critics, his most consistent yet, blending the peerless haze of his patented Cocteau Twins sound with a more modern, cinematic bent.
Roy Montgomery	Roy Montgomery is a guitarist from Christchurch, New Zealand. His music consists of mostly instrumental solo works with elements of post-rock, lo-fi, folk and avant-garde experimentation. His signature sound might be described as atmospheric or cinematic, often featuring complex layers of chiming, echoing and/or droning guitar phrases.
Ulrich Schnauss	At once uplifting and otherworldly, the music of Ulrich Schnauss combines multi-layered synthesizers with beats and ethereal vocals, serving as an aural escape route from the trappings of reality. Today, Schnauss expresses a renewed interest in more direct electronic sounds, and aims to substitute traditional verse-chorus-verse structures for more freeform atmospherics. Stripping back the orgiastic excess of multilayered instrumentation
Whipping Boy	The Irish band Whipping Boy was made up of Fearghal McKee (vocals, guitar) Paul Page (guitar), Myles McDonnell (bass, backing vocals) and Colm Hassett (drums). They reformed in 2011, where only McKee and Hassett remain from the original band. The new members are Finn O’Connor, Killian McGowan and Joey McGowan (bass). Critics describe Whipping Boy as light years ahead of this Irish quartet's obscure, out-of-print debut Submarine.
Various Artists	Named for the U.K.-based label that put it out, the 3...2...1... A Rocket Girl Compilation includes a wide range of turn of the century psych, ambient, and indie bands. Critics describe Rocket Girl's compilation as a fine portrait of a great outfit, one that pursues its vision of music and quality above all else excellently.
Silver Apples	Silver Apples are a psychedelic electronic music duo from New York City, formed in 1967 and composed of Simeon Coxe III, who performs as Simeon, on a primitive synthesizer of his own devising (also named The Simeon), and until his death in 2005, drummer Danny Taylor. Silver Apples were one of the first groups to employ electronic music techniques extensively within a rockidiom, and their minimalistic style, with its pulsing, driving beat and frequently discordant modality, anticipated not only the experimental electronic music and krautrock of the 1970s, but underground dance music and indie rock of the 1990s as well.
State River Widening	Named after the title of a Chinese propaganda photo, London-based trio State River Widening comprises multi-instrumentalists David Sheppard and Keiron Phelan, along with drummer/percussionist Jon Steele. Critics have described State River Widening as a graceful Tortoise backing an instrumental Nick Drake set and a very distinctive sound from one of the most consistently brilliant groups operating on the UK scene.
Television Personalities	Commonly categorised as the finest cult band in the UK. Television Personalities is led by Dan Treacy – the bands one constant. Their mixture of neo-psychedelia, pop and punk spread over nearly twenty albums has been pivotal for generations of devotees. The bands colourful and erratic history – taking in addiction, homelessness, nervous breakdowns, insanity, numerous line-up changes, and all points in-between – have ensured that while they may never have reaped huge commercial success, they most definitely have never been boring.
The Brothers Movement	The Brothers Movement is composed of brothers Neil (guitars/vocals), Conor (bass), Danda Paxton(guitar/vocals) along with Scott Glennon (guitar) and Andy Parkes on drums. They formed in Dublin in 2007. The Brothers Movement released their self-titled debut album worldwide through Rocket Girl.
Windy & Carl	Windy & Carl are an ambient group based in Dearborn, Michigan, U.S. Formed in 1993 around the core husband-and-wife duo of guitarist Carl Hultgren and bassist/singer Windy Weber. Their drones are primarily derived from guitar, particularly via usage of delay effects, reverb effects, and E-Bow, rather than synthesizers. Another noteworthy aspect of W&C's sound is the absence of drums.
White Ring	White Ring, commonly described as a duo that dwell on the outskirts of pop music. Bryan Kurkimilis and Kendra Malia met on the internet in 2007 and ever since have been creating a sound that blends heavy, distorted electronics with sublime vocals. White Ring's music is highly sought after and very rare indeed.
The Sleeping Years	The Sleeping Years are: Dale Grundle (vocals, guitars, piano, etc.), Tom Page (drums, percussion), Dan Wood (piano, keyboards), Alex Beamont (Cello). Since the release of the Sleeping Years’ debut album ‘We’re Becoming Islands One by One’ (Rocket Girl), Dale Grundle and his band have been busy playing shows in Europe and the UK. With We're Becoming Islands One By One, The Sleeping Years have a record full of timeless melodies that only Bon Iver's For Emma, Forever Ago can rival. When Dale Grundle, aka The Sleeping Years, sings about his hometown and all the magic and misery that surrounds it, he seems quite unique in the plaintive way he can turn simple observations into fascinating tales detailing the struggle and deprivation he quite possibly endured in the sleepy Northern Ireland town of Coleraine, from where he originates.
Transient Waves	Transient Waves were a Philadelphia-based three-piece that emerged from within the shifting network of US 'post-rock' operators that came to prominence in the latter half of the nineties. Critics suggest that by abandoning the linear drive and dynamics of traditional rock in favour of a more textural approach that included the use of the sampler and a shift away from the foregrounding of the 'song' and the 'voice'. Falling somewhere between Slowdive's dream pop and Robert Fripp's sparse electronic work, Transient Waves knows all the right studio tricks to create one stellar, hypnotic treat.
Bell Gardens	Pitchfork Media describe Bell Gardens as a dreamy, chamber-pop ensemble. Their second album, Slow Dawns for Lost Conclusions, has been released on the Rocket Girl label. The band is a collaboration between Kenneth James Gibson and Brian McBride. Mojo (magazine) described Slow Dawns For Lost Conclusions as a mellowed mix of Americana, folk, gospel, and orchestral pop with pedal steel, strings and trumpet adding melancholic texture to the spacious, softly sung arrangements.
White Noise Sound	White Noise Sound are an experimental psychedelic rock band. Their electronic, guitar-based, sound is said to be inspired by the likes of Spacemen 3, Suicide and The Velvet Underground. It has been suggested that their drones and psychedelic melodies are impeccably well done, and at times sublime. The band is suggested to show similarities to Spacemen 3, My Bloody Valentine whilst sharing notes with OMD and Slipstream.

=== Discography ===
Release Year	Artist	Title	Reference
1997	Silver Apples and Windy & Carl	Fractal Flow / I Have Known Love	Rgirl1
1998	Various Artists	Tribute to Spacemen 3	Rgirl2
1998	Roy Montgomery with Kirk Lake	London Is Swinging By His Neck	Rgirl3
1998	Low, Piano Magic & Transient Waves	Sleep at the Bottom / Green Acres	Rgirl4
1999	Loopdrop & The Azusa Plane	Siempre Azul / United States Direct Investment in Other Countries	Rgirl5
1999	Piano Magic	Low Birth Weight	Rgirl6
1999	Gnac	Sevens	Rgirl7
1999	State River Widening	State River Widening	Rgirl8
1999	P.S. I Love You	Where On Earth Is Kevin Shields?	Rgirl9
1999	Various Artists	Sounds from Psychedelphia	Rgirl10
1999	Mazarin	Wheats	Rgirl11
1999	Piano Magic	There's No Need For Us To Be Alone	Rgirl12
2000	Füxa	Techno Light	Rgirl14
2000	Mazarin	Watch It Happen	Rgirl15
2000	Coldharbourstores	A Day Gone By	Rgirl16
2000	David Sheppard & Keiron Phelan	David Sheppard & Keiron Phelan	Rgirl17
2000	Experimental Audio Research	Vibrations	Rgirl18
2000	Piano Magic	Artists' Rifles	Rgirl19
2000	Mazarin	Chasing The Girl	Rgirl20
2000	David Sheppard & Keiron Phelan	2	Rgirl21
2000	Add N to (X)	Add N To Fü(X)a and Another Thing!	Rgirl22
2000	Coldharbourstores	A Day Gone By	Rgirl23
2000	Füxa	Fuxa 2000	Rgril24
2001	P.S. I Love You	Heart of Stone	Rgirl25
2001	Various Artists	An Introduction to Rocket Girl	Rgirl26
2001	Loopdrop	Loopdrop	Rgirl27
2001	Pluxus	...och Resan Fortsätter här	Rgirl28
2001	Mazarin	A Tall Tale Storyline	Rgirl29
2001	Coldharbourstores	More Than The Other	Rgirl30
2001	Piano Magic	Seasonally Affective	Rgirl31
2002	July Skies	Dreaming Of Spires	Rgirl32
2002	Füxa	Supercharged	Rgirl33
2002	Mazarin	Suicide Will Make You Happy / Flying	Rgirl34
2002	Pluxus	Agent Tangent	Rgirl35
2002	Pluxus	European Onion	Rgirl36
2002	Keiron Phelan & David Sheppard	O, Little Stars	Rgirl37
2002	Byrne	Sleeping Giant / Greener	Rgirl38
2002	Byrne	Tidal Wave	Rgirl39
2002	State River Widening	Early Music	Rgirl40
2003	Byrne	Tidal Wave	Rgirl41
2003	Frausdots	Dead Wrong	Rgirl42
2004	Frausdots	Couture, Couture, Couture	Rgirl43
2004	Robin Guthrie	Continental	Rgirl44
2006	The Lilys	Everything Wrong Is Imaginary	Rgirl45
2006	Robin Guthrie	Everlasting	Rgirl46
2006	God Is An Astronaut	A Moment of Stillness	Rgirl47
2006	God Is An Astronaut	All Is Violent, All Is Bright	Rgirl48
2006	Robin Guthrie	Waiting for Dawn	Rgirl49
2006	Lilys	A Diana's Diana (radio edit) / With Candy	Rgirl50
2008	The Sleeping Years	We’re Becoming Islands One by One	Rgirl51
2009	Sam Kills Two	Sam Kills Two	Rgirl52
	Robin Guthrie	3:19	Rgirl53
2008	A Place to Bury Strangers	I know I'll see you	Rgirl54
2008	A Place to Bury Strangers	A Place to Bury Strangers	Rgirl55
2009	A Place to Bury Strangers	Missing You	Rgirl56
	Sam Kills Two	No. 6	Rgirl57
2010	Television Personalities	You're My Yoko / the girl from nowhere	Rgirl58
2009	Robin Guthrie	Angel Falls	Rgirl59
2009	Robin Guthrie	Carousel	Rgirl60
	Robin Guthrie	Songs to help my children sleep	Rgirl61
2010	Ulrich Schnauss	Missing Deadlines	Rgirl62
	The Brothers Movement	Standing Still / Lay Alone	Rgirl63
2009	The Brothers Movement	The Brothers Movement	Rgirl64
2010	The Brothers Movement	Blind / Sister	Rgirl65
2010	Television Personalities	A Memory Is Better Than Nothing	Rgirl66
	Project Skyward	Moved by Opposing Forces	Rgirl67
2010	Peter Daltrey	Heroine / Tattoo double	Rgirl68
2010	Kennedy Green	Kennedy Green	Rgirl69
2010	Robin Guthrie	Sunflower Stories	Rgirl70
2010	Pieter Nooten	Here is Why	Rgirl71
	Kennedy Green	Cocopah	Rgirl72
	aM™[aem]	Belong to Galaxy	Rgirl73
2011	Various Artists	3...2...1... A Rocket Girl Compilation	Rgirl74
	Sam Kills Two	Pretty Ugly	Rgirl75
2012	Füxa	Our Lips Are Sealed / Crystal Blue (dean and britta song remixed by Fuxa)	Rgirl76
	Robin Guthrie	Emeralds	Rgirl77
2011	Drugstore	Sweet Chili Girl / Clouds	Rgirl78
2011	Drugstore	Anatomy	Rgirl79
2012	Füxa	Electric Sound of Summer	Rgirl80
	White Ring	Black Earth That Made Me	Rgirl81
	Drugstore	Standing Still	Rgirl82
2012	Azusa Plane	Where The Sands Turn To Gold	Rgirl83
2012	Drugstore	Aquamarine	Rgirl84
2012	Pieter Nooten	Surround Us	Rgirl85
2012	Anthony Reynolds	A World Of Colin Wilson CD album. Featuring Colin Wilson.	Rgirl86
2012	Whipping Boy	No one Takes Prisoners Anymore / Earth's Last Picture	Rgirl87
2012	Eat Lights Become Lights	Heavy Electrics	Rgirl88
2012	Jon DeRosa	Birds of Brooklyn	Rgirl89
2012	Jon DeRosa	A Wolf in Preacher's Clothes	Rgirl90
2013	Pieter Nooten	Haven	Rgirl92
2013	Füxa	Photon	Rgirl93
2013	Jon DeRosa	Signs of Life	Rgirl95
2013	Eat Lights Become Lights	Modular Living	Rgirl96
2013	Füxa	Dirty D	Rgirl97
2013	God Is An Astronaut	Origins	Rgirl98
2013	God Is An Astronaut	Spiral Code	Rgirl99
2013	Various	Rocket Girl 100	Rgirl100
2014	Eat Lights Become Lights	Into Forever	Rgirl101
2014	Bell Gardens	Slow Dawns for Lost Conclusions	Rgirl103
2015	White Noise Sound	Like A Pyramid of Fire	Rgirl104
2015	White Noise Sound	Heavy Echo	Rgirl107
