= A Trick of the Sea =

Album by Piano Magic

Studio album by Piano Magic
- Released: October 1998
- Genre: Post-rock
- Length: 39:20
- Label: Darla Records

Piano Magic chronology
Popular Mechanics (1997)	A Trick of the Sea (1998)	Low Birth Weight (1999)

Professional ratings
Review scores
Source	Rating
Allmusic	4/5 stars

A Trick of the Sea is the second album by Piano Magic. It is the thirteenth entry in Darla Records' Bliss Out series.

== Track listing ==
1. "A Trick of the Sea" – 20:22
2. "Halloween Boat" – 18:58
