= We Are Urusei Yatsura =

Studio album by Urusei Yatsura
- Released: 20 May 1996
- Genre: Indie rock
- Label: Ché Trading Records

Urusei Yatsura chronology
All Hail Urusei Yatsura (1994)	We Are Urusei Yatsura (1996)	¡Pulpo! (1997)

Professional ratings
Review scores
Source	Rating
AllMusic	4.5/5 stars

We Are Urusei Yatsura is an album by Scottish indie rock band Urusei Yatsura, released on 20 May 1996. In the U.S.A. it is known as We Are Yatsura.

== Track listing ==
1. "Siamese" - 2.38
2. "First Day On A New Planet" - 3.33
3. "Pow R. Ball" - 2.30
4. "Kewpies Like Watermelon" - 2.35
5. "Phasers On Stun / Sola Kola" - 3.07
6. "Black Hole Love" - 5.13
7. "Velvy Blood" - 2.57
8. "Plastic Ashtray" - 2.53
9. "Death 2 Everyone" - 2.48
10. "Pachinko" - 3.52
11. Untitled - 0.23
12. "Kernel" - 3.35
13. "Road Song" - 6.35
