= Low Birth Weight =

Studio album by Piano Magic
- Released: May 1999
- Genre: Post-rock
- Length: 50:36
- Label: Rocket Girl

Piano Magic chronology
A Trick of the Sea (1998)	Low Birth Weight (1999)	Artists' Rifles (2000)

Professional ratings
Review scores
Source	Rating
AllMusic	4.5/5 stars
NME	7/10

Low Birth Weight is the third album by English band Piano Magic, released in May 1999 by Rocket Girl. The cover image is a cropped portion of "The Kittens' Tea Party", by Walter Potter.

The album features the usual contributions from Piano Magic founder Glen Johnson, as well as from Martin Cooper (OMD), Ian Crause (Disco Inferno), and Robin Saville and Antony Ryan (Isan).

== Critical reception ==
Exclaim! wrote that "the sparse use of warm analogue electronics and the soft musical complexion bring to mind American bands like Low, although Piano Magic has a distinctly British vibe, owing an appropriate debt to the hypnotic ambience of Spacemen 3 and My Bloody Valentine."

== Track listing ==
No.	Title	Writer(s)	Length
1.	"Snowfall Soon"	Glen Johnson; Martin Cooper	5:02
2.	"Crown Estate"	Johnson; Matt Simpson	4:33
3.	"Bad Patient"	Johnson; Antony Ryan; Robin Saville	5:00
4.	"The Fun of the Century"	Jen Adam	5:01
5.	"Birdymachine"	Johnson	1:25
6.	"Not Fair"	Johnson; Cooper	4:12
7.	"Dark Secrets Look for Light"	Johnson; Simpson; Simon Rivers; Matt Sawyer	4:52
8.	"Snow Drums"	Johnson; Cooper	4:59
9.	"Shepherds Are Needed"	Johnson	5:20
10.	"I Am the Sub-Librarian"	Johnson; Cooper	4:26
11.	"Waking Up"	Ian Crause	5:49
Total length:			50:39
