= Catchers (band) =

Irish indie pop band

- Origin: Portstewart, Northern Ireland
- Genres: Indie pop, dream pop
- Years active: 1993–current
- Labels: Setanta, Discovery
- Website: www.facebook.com/Catchers-24724604225/

Catchers are an Irish indie pop band formed in 1993 and led by singer-songwriter Dale Grundle with Alice Lemon (vocals/keyboards). Former band members include Peter Kelly (drums), Ger FitzGerald (bass until 1995), Craig Carpenter (bass, 1996 onwards), and Jonathan Lord (lead guitar, 1998). Grundle and Lemon have known each other since their teens in Portstewart, Northern Ireland. In 2006, Grundle formed The Sleeping Years. In 2021, Dale and Alice began writing new material with drummer Roger Luxton, releasing Catchers’ single "Something's Taking Over Me" on 5 November 2021.

== Biography ==
Early demos were sent to various London-based labels in 1994 and caught the attention of Setanta Records supremo, Keith Cullen. Their first release, a 7" called Cotton dress, was recorded with Divine Comedy producer Darren Allison at Dave Stewart's London studio and became Melody Maker's Single Of The Week. "Catchers are sublime, enchanting and some strange kind of wonderful" (Melody Maker). A great deal of press attention followed, especially in France where, on the strengths of the "Cotton Dress" single alone, the band was offered a prestigious Black Session on C'est Lenoir, a legendary Radio France program.

Mute, the band's first album, was produced by Mike Hedges at his studio in Normandy, France. Mute was released at the end of September 1994 to critical acclaim on both sides of the English Channel, especially in France. "Truly wonderful" (Melody Maker). "Deliriously great songs" (NME). ‘’A record of pastoral delights’’ (The Times). From then on, France would become a second home for the band. In 1994, Mute made both the journalists’ and the readers’ top ten albums of the year poll in the influential Les Inrockuptibles magazine. The rest of the year and the first part of 1995 were spent on the road in the UK and mainland Europe opening for the likes of Oasis, Pulp, and Edwyn Collins, as well as headlining their own shows and playing both La Route du Rock and Les Inrocks festivals in France.

In 1995, Catchers signed to Warner Music Discovery in the US, a label run by the legendary Jac Holzman, founder of Elektra Records. Holzman had previously signed The Doors and Love to his fledgling label in the sixties. The band temporarily relocated to New York City and started a three-month tour that would take them from coast to coast, opening for The Innocence Mission as well as headlining their own dates.

In the autumn of 1995, the band returned to London and Dale Grundle started working on new demos in his home studio. Catchers resurfaced in 1998 with a new single, Call Her Name. By this time, the band had become a five-piece with the addition of an extra guitarist, Jonathan Lord, and a new bass player, Craig Carpenter.

Later that year, the band released Stooping to Fit, their second album. Recorded at the Cocteau Twins studios in London, Stooping to Fit displayed some intense and beautiful strings and brass arrangements by Nick Drake's collaborator, Robert Kirby, and revealed a darker edge to Grundle's pop sensibility. Comparisons with The Cure were made in recognition of Dale's ability to write an album with great, straightforward pop songs as well as more moody and searing numbers.

Stooping to Fit was very well received in France and the band was invited to play at La Route du Rock festival in Brittany a second time as well as Les Rockomotives festival in Vendôme. In September 1998, Catchers embarked on a 15-date tour around France for what would ultimately be their last headlining tour.

In spite of glowing reviews ("Wonderfully crafted song smithery" (Time Out), "A soft-spoken masterpiece" (The Times), "The most emotive pop music around" (Totally Wired)), Stooping to Fit was poorly promoted by their UK label, Setanta Records, and sales were disappointing.

On 19 February 1999, Catchers played at The Garage in Highbury, London. This was to be their last show for several years.

In 2006, news of Dale Grundle surfaced in an interview for the French online fanzine Attica in which he announced that he was working on a new project called The Sleeping Years.

In June 2019, Catchers reissued Mute on vinyl through the French record label, Les Disques du 7ème Ciel, and also released a live album and an album of outtakes, We Speak in Flames through TSY Records. That year, Dale and Alice reformed the band to play shows in France to promote the 25th-anniversary edition of Mute.

== Discography ==
=== Albums ===
- Mute (1994)
- Stooping to Fit (1998)
- Mute (Remastered) (2019)
- Catchers Live 1994-1996 (2019)
- We Speak in Flames (2019)

=== Singles and EPs ===
- "Cotton Dress" (1994)
- "Shifting" (1994)
- Shifting EP (1994)
- "Call Her Name" (1998)
- "Come Around" (1998)
- Shifting EP (Remastered) (2019)
- Something's Taking Over Me (2021)
