= Writers Without Homes =

Studio album by Piano Magic
- Released: 10 June 2002
- Genre: Post-rock
- Length: 52:00
- Label: 4AD

Piano Magic chronology
| Son de Mar (2001) | Writers Without Homes (2002) | The Troubled Sleep of Piano Magic (2003) |

Professional ratings
Aggregate scores
| Source | Rating |
|---|---|
| Metacritic | 59/100 |
Review scores
| Source | Rating |
| AllMusic | 2/5 stars |
| The Guardian | 3/5 stars |
| Mojo | 3.5/5 stars |
| Pitchfork | 6.1/10 |
| Q | 3/5 stars |
| Uncut | 8/10 |

Released in 2002, Writers Without Homes is the sixth album by Piano Magic. Track 7, "Crown of the Lost", features vocals by Vashti Bunyan, her first vocal work since 1970.

== Track listing ==
1. "(Music Won't Save You From Anything But) Silence" – 6:40
2. "Postal" – 3:08
3. "Modern Jupiter" – 4:41
4. "(1.30)" – 1:31
5. "The Season Is Long" – 8:43
6. "Certainty" – 3:13
7. "Crown of the Lost" – 4:14
8. "It's the Same Dream That Lasts All Night" – '0:56
9. "Dutch Housing" – 3:14
10. "Already Ghosts" – 4:48
11. "Shot Through the Fog" – 10:48
