= Part Monster =

Studio album by Piano Magic
- Released: 29 May 2007
- Genre: Post-rock
- Length: 48:16
- Label: Important Records

Piano Magic chronology
Disaffected (2005)	Part Monster (2007)

Professional ratings
Review scores
Source	Rating
Pitchfork Media	6.2/10 link

Part Monster is the ninth album by Piano Magic. It was released on 29 May 2007.

== Track listing ==
1. The Last Engineer 5:38
2. England's Always Better (As You're Pulling Away) 6:04
3. Incurable (Reprise) 4:45
4. Soldier Song 5:01
5. The King Cannot Be Found 3:53
6. Great Escapes 4:37
7. Cities & Factories 5:16
8. Halfway Through 4:11
9. Saints Preserve Us 5:53
10. Part Monster 2:58
