= The Sleeping Years =

- Origin: Coleraine, Northern Ireland
- Genres: Indie folk
- Years active: 2007–present
- Labels: Talitres Records, Rocket Girl
- Spinoff of: Catchers
- Website: http://www.sleepingyears.com

The Sleeping Years is the solo project for ex-Catchers singer Dale Grundle.

== Biography ==
Dale Grundle started The Sleeping Years by releasing a trilogy of home recorded EPs, You and Me Against the World, Setting Fire to Sleepy Towns and Clocks and Clones throughout 2007. The EPs were limited to numbers ranging from 500–750 copies and were packaged in handmade sleeves created by the young design company Pika Pika.

Upon their release the EPs garnered critical acclaim, featuring on BBC Radio 1’s Introducing, the Guardian’s writer’s play list and on the cover mount of Rolling Stone and The Word. Songs were also heavily played on Gideon Coe’s 6music show, Stuart Bailie’s BBC Radio show, and on French radio, having been championed by Bernard Lenoir.

Grundle then played his first solo shows. He began working together with cellist Michelle So and recorded a video session for the website Le Cargo on a rooftop in the north of Paris. The duo also held a secret concert at the same venue (Septieme Ciel) for French webzine Popnews. They played across France, appearing at shows in Toulouse, Nevers and Paris. After returning to London, they began working on the first album.

We're Becoming Islands One By One was recorded in London in December 2007. Grundle worked on the album alongside engineer Ian Dowling at the Smokehouse Studios and at the Strongroom. Tom Page from Rothko was invited to play drums on the record and shortly afterwards became a full-time member. Also performing on the record was Ben Eshmade who provided French horn on the song "Human Blues". So played cello and Grundle performed all the vocals and guitars, bass, Hammond organ, Rhodes piano and e-bow parts.

The album was released in 2008 on Talitres Records in France and by Rocketgirl in the UK and Ireland to great reviews: "A record that only Bon Iver's ‘For Emma, Forever Ago’ has really rivaled in recent months. (Drowned in Sound)

In 2007, Grundle collaborated with Mark Beazley from Rothko on a track entitled "While December Turns" for the Arctic Circle Xmas album That Fuzzy Feeling. In 2008, he worked with songwriter Ted Barnes on a song called "This Old World Grown Quiet" for the Arctic Circle's That Fuzzy Feeling EP.

The Sleeping Years have toured across Europe, including dates supporting Bowerbirds, Damien Jurado, Scout Niblett, Edwyn Collins, The Notwist and Okkervil River.

"You and Me Against the World" was featured in Jamie Oliver's series Jamie's American Road Trip.

== Discography ==
=== Albums ===
- We're Becoming Islands One By One 2008

=== EPs ===
- You and Me Against the World 2007
- Setting Fire to Sleepy Towns 2007
- Clocks and Clones 2007

=== Singles ===
- "Into Sunlight" 2009

== Compilations ==
- That Fuzzy Feeling 2007 (Loaf Recordings)
- That Fuzzy Feeling EP 2008 (Static Caravan)
- Ten 2009 (Trace Recordings)
- 3...2...1... A Rocket Girl Compilation (Rocket Girl)
