= The Troubled Sleep of Piano Magic =

Studio album by Piano Magic
- Released: 15 December 2003
- Genre: Post-rock
- Length: 52:41
- Label: Green UFOs

Piano Magic chronology
Writers Without Homes (2002)	The Troubled Sleep of Piano Magic (2003)	Disaffected (2005)

Professional ratings
Review scores
Source	Rating
AllMusic	4/5 stars
Pitchfork	7.3/10

The Troubled Sleep of Piano Magic is the seventh album by Piano Magic.

== Track listing ==
1. Saint Marie 5:40
2. The Unwritten Law 3:20
3. Speed the Road, Rush the Lights 7:44
4. Help Me Warm This Frozen Heart 4:32
5. I Am the Teacher's Son 6:29
6. The End of a Dark, Tired Year 5:01
7. The Tollbooth Martyrs 5:17
8. When I'm Done, This Night Will Fear Me 5:05
9. Luxembourg Gardens 7:27
10. Comets 3:46
