= Eat Lights Become Lights =

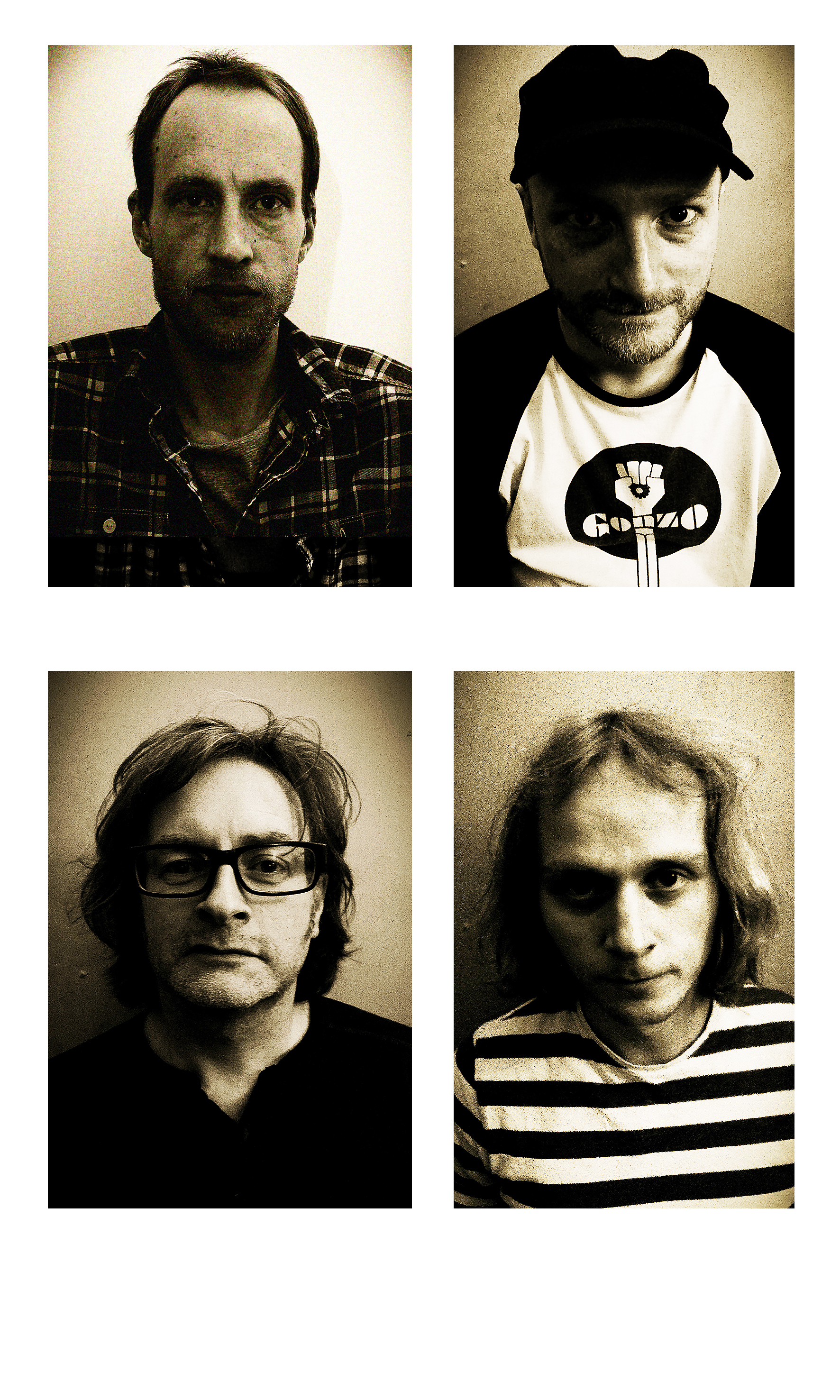

Background information
- Also known as: ELBL
- Origin: London, England
- Genres: Alternative rock, krautrock, electronic, indie rock
- Years active: 2007–present
- Labels: Rocket Girl, Enraptured, The Great Pop Supplement
- Members: Neil Branquinho; John Barrett
- Past members: Carl Harms - Guitars; Claire Watson - Keys; Adam Jacobs - Drums; Mark Parsons - Electric Bass; Paul Lewis - Bass
- Website: eatlightsbecomelights.blogspot.co.uk

Eat Lights Become Lights (abbreviated as ELBL) is a British alternative rock band. They are known for their live performances as the house band at Klub Motorik. The band take inspiration from the likes of Kraftwerk, who were major influences on what would become known as post-punk music. Krautrock has progressively developed internationally, and each region interprets the musical structure differently. Eat Lights Become Lights have repackaged krautrock for a new audience without compromising on the long standing musical codes and conventions.

== Origins ==
Eat Lights Become Lights was formed in London in 2007, by Neil Branquinho, who also serves as the writer and producer of the band's work. Band members include Branquinho on loops guitar and synthesizers, as well as John Barrett on drums. Neil Branquinho was influenced by minimalist and drone artists such as Spacemen 3, early Spiritualized, Loop, Steve Reich, Ali Farka and the more obvious electronic sources. As the music developed, more electronic based influences started to overtake due to their generally wider and sometimes limitless palette of sounds. Using these sources, less as a guidebook and more as a platform, this new dynamic evolved. The name "Eat Lights Become Lights" was intended to be something memorable, but not the one word band name, which Rudd suggested was commonplace in the industry. It is suggested to be a "mantra" or "statement" that alludes to something "nebulous" and offers audiences an anchor point from which to explore the sound. The trademark Eat Lights Become Lights sound owes much to Neil's love of German avant rock and electronic music of the 1970s, which some suggest is not just "pastiche" or "homage", but rather a "soulful extension" conveyed through a concoction of motorik grooves, overpowering noise, and then balanced with a uniqueness that indicates most clearly the bands "burgeoning potential".

== Releases ==
The début single "They Transmit" was released in May 2008. As well as being noted by NME, it was record of the week for both Manchester’s Piccadilly Records and Norman Records in Leeds. "Klustered", the second single, had a more modern inspiration from the krautrock sound. It was suggested to be a tribute to Klaus Dinger of Neu!. Their third single, "Test Drive" came out on square green vinyl in February 2011, featuring a remix by Silver Apples. When the first Eat Lights Become Lights album "Autopia" appeared in March 2011, it received an enthusiastic reception across the music press.

The second album, "Heavy Electrics", which arrived in September 2012 on Rocket Girl, was acclaimed for its motorik beat and uniquely accelerating guitar sounds. It has been suggested that the intricate patterns of the album cover may have been inspired by HR Giger. The album was noted in Q Magazine, The Quietus and Blank Media Collective, where it received a 5/5 rating, in addition to Prog Magazine, DATES and Musik.

The third album, "Modular Living" (July 2013, Rocket Girl) has taken a more organic, electronic approach in places. The album, when performed live with a dual drummer stage setup, has been dubbed "incredible". Some of the adjectives used to describe it include Motorik, progressive, resonating and insistent. Modular Living, is said to borrow from various influences such as Can, Neu!, Kraftwerk, Hillage, Cluster, and a slice of Spiritualized. The sound sample opposite shows how analogue and software synths are used alongside traditional guitar, bass and drums, to construct an ever-evolving synthetic landscape of harmony and melody, feedback and drones, underpinned with driving, insistent motorik percussion.

== Live performances ==
Live Eat Lights Become Lights performances have become somewhat renowned and have a regular attendance by the patrons of Klub Motorik. They have been described by Trebuchet Magazine as a "great band who seem to mix [...] Krautrock-like Prog elements through a Stereolab filter". In 2010, the band toured with Simeon of the Silver Apples, while also serving as guest sound carriers for Can singer Damo Suzuki's live performances.

== Radio appearances ==
Eat Lights Become Lights appeared on BBC Radio 6 Music's "Freak Zone" with Stuart Maconie and "6 Mix" with Andrew Weatherall. The band has also been aired on the BBC's flagship Radio 6 Music programmes of Gideon Coe and Lauren Laverne.

== Discography ==
- Nature Reserve (Eat Lights Recordings / The Great Pop Supplement, March 2017)
- Into Forever (Rocket Girl/ The Great Pop Supplement, May 2014)
- Modular Living (Rocket Girl / The Great Pop Supplement, July 2013)
- "Habitat '67" (Rocket Girl / The Great Pop Supplement, June 2013)
- Heavy Electrics (Rocket Girl / The Great Pop Supplement, September 2012)
- Autopia (Enraptured, March 2011)
- "Test Drive" (The Great Pop Supplement, February 2011)
- "Klustered" (Enraptured, April 2009)
- "They Transmit" (Enraptured, May 2008)
