= Anatomy (Drugstore album) =

Studio album by Drugstore
- Released: 8 August 2011
- Recorded: February – March 2011
- Genre: Dream pop, alternative rock
- Label: Rocket Girl

Drugstore chronology
Songs for the Jet Set (2001)	Anatomy (2011)	The Best of Drugstore (2013)

Singles from Anatomy
- 1. "Sweet Chili Girl" Released: July 2011; 2. "Standing Still" Released: September 2011; 3. "Aquamarine" Released: April 2012

Professional ratings
Review scores
Source	Rating
AllMusic	4/5 stars
Drowned in Sound	7/10
Hot Press	5/5

Anatomy is the fourth studio album by dream pop band Drugstore. It was released in 2011, following an eight-year hiatus by the band, and available both as a CD and as a limited edition clear vinyl. The album was recorded at Panic Button Studios with Steve Lyon on Platts Eyot, Hampton, a small island in the River Thames.

== Artwork ==
The cover of Anatomy features singer-songwriter Isabel Monteiro on a deserted beach holding a pistol. It was shot at Stone Bay, in Broadstairs, Kent.

== Track listing ==
All songs by Isabel Monteiro

No.	Title	Length
1.	"Sweet Chili Girl"	3:21
2.	"Lights Out"	3:17
3.	"Sinner's Descent"	4:04
4.	"Can't Stop Me Now"	4:00
5.	"Aquamarine"	4:57
6.	"Standing Still"	4:16
7.	"Blackholes and BrokenHearts"	3:31
8.	"Falling Rocks"	3:18
9.	"La Brume"	2:26
10.	"Clouds"	4:27
