= Pluxus =

Swedish band

- Origin: Stockholm, Sweden
- Genres: Electronica, trip hop, IDM
- Labels: Pluxemburg, Rocket Girl
- Members: Sebastian Tesch; Adam Kammerland; Anders Ekert
- Past members: Björn Carlberg
- Website: www.myspace.com/pluxus

Pluxus is a Swedish electronic music group from Stockholm, Sweden. The members are Sebastian Tesch, Adam Kammerland and Anders Ekert. Björn Carlberg was with the band until 2003. They use analogue synthesizers, samples and drum programming sets for their songs.

Pluxus has released four major albums on their own label Pluxemburg, as well as a number of singles, EPs and remixes. They also remixed the song Get On With Your Life for musician Stina Nordenstam. Their song Transient was used as the music to the Ford Fiesta TV advert in Europe.

== Records ==
- Pluxus 7" (1998)
- Fas 2 (1999)
- Och resan fortsätter här (2000)
- Agent Tangent EP (2002)
- European Onion (2002)
- Reonion EP (2003)
- Solid State (2006)
- Plu Plux Plan (Best Of) (2006)
- Transient EP (2008)
- Solid State (2008) Kompakt rerelease
