= Andreas Tilliander =

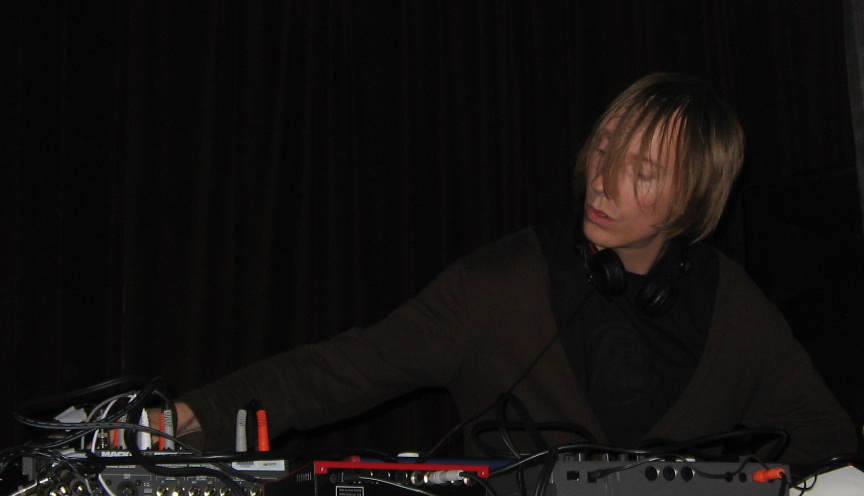
- Andreas Tilliander performing live in 2006

Background information
- Born: Berndt Andreas Tilliander; 1977 (age 47–48); Sweden
- Genres: Electronica; drone; techno
- Occupation: Producer

Berndt Andreas Tilliander (born 1977) is a Swedish electronica, drone and techno producer who significantly contributed to the evolution of the 'clicks & cuts' genre with his first albums Cliphop (Raster.Noton) and Ljud (Mille Plateaux). He has recorded music under many names (Lowfour, Mokira, Rechord, TM404 and more) and worked with some of Europe's influential electronic music labels. He has been awarded a Swedish Grammy music award in 2005, after two consecutive nominations. He also works with Familjen as a live musician. The song "Arlanda" (from Show (2009), featuring vocals from Jocke Berg of the band Kent.

A native of Hässleholm, Tilliander now resides in Stockholm, where he runs Repeatle Studios and apart from creating his own music, works as a mastering engineer for several record labels. He also works for the radio show Elektroniskt (previously, Ström), broadcast on Sveriges Radio P2.

== Selected album discography ==
=== Andreas Tilliander / Tilliander ===
- Ljud (20 March 2001, Mille Plateaux)
- Elit (Nov 2002, Mille Plateaux)
- World Industries (October 2004, Pluxemburg)
- Show (April 2009, Adrian)
- Mini LP (2013, Börft)
- Compuriddim (2017, iDEAL)
- with Elin Franzén – Japan (2017, Repeatle)

=== Mokira ===
- Cliphop(Oct 2000, Raster.Noton)
- Plee(Mar 2002, Mille Plateaux)
- Album (August 2004, Type)
- Fft Pop (October 2004, Cubicfabric)
- Hateless (March 2006, iDEAL)
- Ease (2006, Filippa K)
- Persona (May 2009, Type)
- Time Axis Manipulation (2011, Kontra-Musik)

=== TM404 ===
- TM404 (2013, Kontra-Musik)
- Acidub (2016, Kontra-Musik)

=== Rechord ===
- Skokoll (2002, audio.nl)

=== Komp ===
- Vena (2000, Komplott)

=== Lowfour ===
- Repeatle (2001, Force Lab)
- Ian EP (2002, Echocord)
