= Disaffected =

Studio album by Piano Magic
- Released: 18 April 2005
- Genre: Post-rock
- Length: 46:44
- Label: Darla Records

Piano Magic chronology
| The Troubled Sleep of Piano Magic (2003) | Disaffected (2005) | Part Monster (2007) |

Professional ratings
Review scores
| Source | Rating |
|---|---|
| Allmusic | 4/5 stars |
| Pitchfork Media | (7.6/10) |

Disaffected is the eighth album by Piano Magic.

== Track listing ==
1. "You Can Hear the Room" – 6:22
2. "Love & Music" – 4:50
3. "Night of the Hunter" – 3:16
4. "Disaffected" – 7:18
5. "Theory of Ghosts" – 4:01
6. "Your Ghost" – 5:35
7. "I Must Leave London" – 3:07
8. "Deleted Scenes" – 3:59
9. "The Nostalgist" – 3:58
10. "You Can Never Get Lost (When You've Nowhere to Go)" – 4:18

== Credits ==
- Bass – Alasdair Steer
- Drums, Percussion, Keyboards, Piano, Programmed By – Jerome Tcherneyan
- Guitar, Keyboards – Franck Alba
- Keyboards, Programmed By – Cedric Pin
- Vocals – Angèle David-Guillou; John Grant (musician) ("Your Ghost")
- Voice, Guitar, Programmed By – Glen Johnson
