= Slain by Urusei Yatsura =

Slain By Urusei Yatsura

Studio album by Urusei Yatsura
- Released: 1998
- Genre: Indie rock
- Label: Sire Records
- Producer: Chris Allison

Urusei Yatsura chronology
¡Pulpo! (1997)	Slain By Urusei Yatsura (1998)	Everybody Loves Urusei Yatsura (2000)

Professional ratings
Review scores
Source	Rating
AllMusic	4.5/5 stars
The A.V. Club	(positive)

Slain By Urusei Yatsura is an album by Scottish indie rock band Urusei Yatsura, released in 1998. It contains the band's only Top 40 hit, "Hello Tiger".

== Track listing ==
1. "Glo Starz" - 3:32
2. "Hello Tiger" - 3:17
3. "Strategic Hamlets" - 2:38
4. "No 1 Cheesecake" - 2:44
5. "Superfi" - 3:44
6. "No No Girl" - 4:58
7. "Flaming Skull" - 3:31
8. "Slain By Elf" - 3:36
9. "King Of Lazy" - 3:06
10. "Exidor" - 2:58
11. "Fake Fur" - 3:02
12. "Skull In Action" - 3:13
13. "Amber" - 2:53
