= 30 Amp Fuse =

American pop punk band

- Origin: Knoxville, Tennessee
- Genres: Pop-punk; Punk rock
- Years active: 1995-1997
- Labels: Darla Records; Dedicated Records; Ché Trading
- Past members: Mike Smithers, Rodney Cash, Mike Knott, Don Coffey Jr., John Davis, Dale Harman

30 Amp Fuse was a pop-punk band from Knoxville, Tennessee active in the 1990s and 2000s made up of Mike Smithers, Rodney Cash, Mike Knott, and formerly Don Coffey Jr., Dale Harman and John Davis.

Smithers attended Farragut High School in nearby Farragut, Tennessee and was in various bands in Knoxville, playing with Coffey and Davis before forming 30 Amp Fuse.

Their first album, 1995's Wind-Up, was on Darla Records with a lineup of Smithers, Davis and Coffey, Jr.; the latter two were also members of Knoxville band Superdrag who found success in the 1990s. When Superdrag achieved success and signed to Elektra Records, Coffey and Davis left 30 Amp Fuse and were replaced by Mike Knott and Rodney Cash. They also released a single, "Punk Rock Virtuoso" in 1996 on Ché Trading.

Their 1997 album Saturday Night at the Atomic Speedway on Dedicated Records was recorded in Fort Collins, Colorado by Bill Stevenson and Stephen Egerton of punk band Descendents and received positive reviews from The A.V. Club and the MetroPulse.

The band split up in the late 1990s but played reunion shows for the 15th anniversary of Wind-Up in 2010 and the 20th anniversary of Saturday Night at the Atomic Speedway in 2017.
