= Artists' Rifles (album) =

Studio album by Piano Magic
- Released: May 2000
- Genre: Post-rock
- Length: 39:23
- Label: Rocket Girl

Piano Magic chronology
Low Birth Weight (1999)	Artists' Rifles (2000)	Son de Mar (2001)

Professional ratings
Review scores
Source	Rating
AllMusic	4/5 stars
NME	(6/10)

Artists' Rifles is the fourth album by Piano Magic, released in 2000 on the Rocket Girl label.

== Track listing ==
1. "(1.16)" 1:16
2. "No Closure" 5:11
3. "A Return to the Sea" 5:03
4. "(1.22)" 1:22
5. "You and John are Birds" 5:55
6. "The Index" 3:29
7. "(1.50)" 1:50
8. "Century Schoolbook" 3:47
9. "Password" 7:08
10. "Artists' Rifles" 4:22
