= Everybody Loves Urusei Yatsura =

Studio album by Urusei Yatsura
- Released: 2000
- Genre: Indie rock
- Label: Oni Records

Urusei Yatsura chronology
Slain by Urusei Yatsura (1998)	Everybody Loves Urusei Yatsura (2000)

Professional ratings
Review scores
Source	Rating
Drowned in Sound	8/10
NME	7/10

Everybody Loves Urusei Yatsura is the last album by Scottish indie rock Urusei Yatsura, released in 2000.

The track "Thank You" is noted for containing ZX Spectrum BASIC code, which displays a red background reading "Hail Satan, Lick His Cloven Hoof". The program also contains a comment of "What is sadder a) finding this b) writing it?".

== Track listing ==
No.	Title	Length
1.	"Louche 33"	3:20
2.	"Eastern Youth"	3:26
3.	"Superdeformer"	3:40
4.	"Silver Dragon"	3:32
5.	"Uji Bomb"	5:10
6.	"Our Shining Path"	4:41
7.	"Kubrick In Town"	4:01
8.	"Random Cruise"	4:31
9.	"Faking It"	3:42
10.	"Thank You"	3:23
11.	"Sores"	5:43
12.	"Osaka White"	1:13
Total length:		46:24
