= Füxa =

American rock band

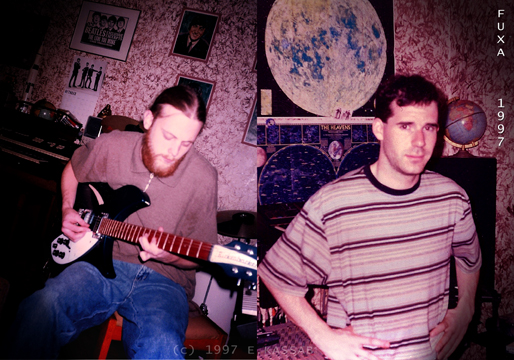
- The two formers of Füxa at Mission Control Studio, Warren, Michigan in 1997. From left to right: Randall Nieman and Ryan Anderson

Background information
- Origin: Detroit, Michigan
- Genres: Space rock
- Years active: 1994–present
- Labels: Rocket Girl, Mind Expansion, Astro Lanes, Burnt Hair, the Great Pop Supplement, Static Caravan, Alley Sweeper, Ché Trading, I (label) and Darla
- Members: Randall Nieman; Tom Meade; Mark Refoy; Jonny Mattock
- Past members: Ryan Anderson; Eric Morrison; Jesse Percival
- Website: www.fuxamusic.com

Füxa (pronounced like the color fuchsia) is an American rock band.

Füxa was formed in Detroit in 1994 by musicians Randall Nieman (formerly of Windy & Carl) and Ryan Anderson (formerly of Asha Vida and later to join Delta Waves). Band members include Randall Nieman (synths/ guitars/ percussion/ Space), Tom Meade (synths/ electronic percussion/ studio effects) Mark Refoy, Jonny Mattock and Stefan Persson. The band quickly achieved cult status with their split recordings with artists such as the Azusa Plane, The Telescopes, Martin Rev, Dean and Britta and Stereolab.

== History ==
Füxa's first collaborative effort, which was immediately bracketed within the psychedelic and experimental category, was a collection of short, guitar and synth driven, primal instrumental space rock songs, recorded at home on a borrowed 6-track cassette recorder. The tapes were later brought to friend Erik Kassab of Gravity Wax for mixing and mastering at his Mission Control home studio. The resulting masters totaled over 90 minutes, and the best hours worth of music was selected for their first release, a hand colored, labeled and numbered cassette. This tape was sold at local indie record shops, and quite a few copies were given away by the band. College DJ Lunar Larry played many selections from this tape on his Friday night program, "The Life According to Larry", on WHFR radio. Nieman & Anderson at that time began to play at Detroit coffee houses, quickly building a cult following with their brief, psychedelic, erratic performances. The duo performed with the assistance of an old, literally falling apart Korg Mono/Poly synthesizer, often left to its own devices to produce loud, random arpeggios throughout the entire performance, which almost always emulated in a drum circle where audience participation was encouraged to "feel good" with the band. It has been suggested that the Detroit-based experimental rock band focus on a lo-fi, electronics-heavy blend of droning, treated guitars, vintage synths, and sparse percussion in the vein of suicide, Spacemen 3 / Spiritualized, and neu!. Ryan Anderson departed from the outfit in 1998, and Randall Nieman took over Füxa as a solo project. In 2001-2003 Ryan Anderson Joined Delta Waves to play drums and perform on a few recordings.

== Releases ==
Their debut single was the self-released split with friends Gravity Wax, followed by "Free Your Soul" EP, which featured the song, "Photon". Füxa's first full-length CD was a compilation of their first 3 singles, entitled "3 Field Rotation", released by England's Che Records in May 1996. To correspond with the release of the disc, the duo was invited over to London to play shows supporting the disc. Later that year, the band was featured on a split 7-inch with Stereolab, and performed a few shows with Stereolab in the United States. Other bands they have split recordings with include Azusa Plane, Orange Cake Mix, Flowchart and Bright. The band's second full-length came out in late 1996, entitled "Very Well Organized" - a collection of songs composed around a 1963 Hammond organ situated in the band's living room. 1997 saw the release of "Venoy", a contribution to Darla Records famous Bliss-out series of EPs. The band also focused on the publication of their fanzine, Masstransfer, with the first issue arriving in November 1997. Fuxa's swirling electronica and atmospheric downbeats are suggested to evoke a forgotten transient landscape.

Füxa's first album in a decade, Electric Sound of Summer, was released on Rocket Girl in 2012. Both Britta Phillips and Dean Wareham (of Luna and, later, Dean & Britta) donate vocals, as does Seefeel’s Sarah Peacock, while members of Spiritualized, Spacemen 3 and Spectrum all contribute. It is suggested to be the cross-pollination of these collaborators’ talents which gives Electric Sound of Summer its strength and bottomless depth. It was dubbed as a "celebration of creativity; of community; of music past, present… and Füxa".

Comprising a sixteen-strong army of collaborators, including BJ Cole, Ann Shenton of Add N to (X), Judy Dyble and Britta Phillips. Füxa's tenth full-length album, Dirty D, was released on Rocket Girl in 2013. It is suggested to display a penchant for swirling electronica and atmospheric downbeats that have been compiled in a way which is constantly pleasing to the ear. The dirty ‘D’ of the title could refer to a number of disquieting facets of today's society – the dominance of Disney, the illusion of democracy, dereliction – and, in contrast to Disney's sickly saccharine supremacy over our children's imaginations.

== Selected discography ==
=== Singles and EP's ===
- 100 White Envelopes 1995 (Mind Expansion - Split 7-inch with Gravity Wax)
- Free Your Soul 1995 (Burnt Hair - 7-inch)
- Dreamlanding 1995 (Mind Expansion/Blue Flea - Split 7-inch with Windy & Carl)
- Standing Under U 1996 (Alley Sweeper - 7-inch)
- Pivot 1996 (Mind Expansion - 7-inch)
- City/Metro 1997 (Darla - Split 7-inch with Bright)
- Greenfield 1997 (Ché Trading/Mind Expansion - CD5/12"EP)
- Venoy 1997 (Darla - CD5/12"EP)
- Green Field 1997 (12-inch I (label))
- Techno Lite 2000 (Rocket Girl - 7-inch)
- Hideaway 2001 (Mind Expansion - 7-inch)
- Fuxa Vs. Six Clips 2004 (Mind Expansion - CDEP)
- Electric Sound Of Summer 2006 (Static Caravan - 7-inch)
- Fuxa Commits Suicide 2007 (Mind Expansion - CDEP)
- Füxa / Dean & Britta 2011 (Rocket Girl Split 7-inch)
- Füxa / Martin Rev Marty Suicide / Coyote 2011 (7-inch The Great Pop Supplement)
- Sun Is Shining 2013 (7-inch Rocket Girl)
- Photon 2013 (7-inch Rocket Girl)
- Füxa, Cheval Sombre - I Love You / You've Got To Hide Your Love Away 2013 (7-inch Mind Expansion)

=== CD/LP/Cassette ===
- In Another Direction 1994 (High Tokes - Limited Edition cassette only)
- 3 Field Rotation 1996 (Ché Trading/Mind Expansion - CD/LP)
- Very Well Organized 1996 (Ché Trading/Mind Expansion - CD/LP)
- Inflight Audio 1998 (Ché Trading/Mind Expansion - CD)
- Accretion 1998 (Mind Expansion - CD/LP)
- Fuxa2000 2000 (Rocket Girl/Mind Expansion - CD)
- Supercharged 2001 (Rocket Girl/Mind Expansion - CD)
- The Modified Mechanics Of This Device 2001 (Antenna Records - CD)
- Füxa Versus Ectogram - Füxa Versus Ectogram 2001 (Ochre Records - CD, MiniAlbum)
- Electric Sound Of Summer 2012 (Rocket Girl - CD/LP)
- Dirty D 2013 (Rocket Girl - CD/LP)
- Füxa & Neil Mackay - Apollo Soyuz 2015 (Emotional Response Records - LP, MiniAlbum)

=== Compilations ===
- Mind Expansion Vol. 1 1995 (Mind Expansion - 4-way split 7-inch)
- Mind Expansion Vol. 2 1996 (Mind Expansion - 4-way split 7-inch)
- Noise Reduction 1996 (Alley Sweeper - CD)
- Disco Sucks 1996 (Ché Trading- CD)
- Elsie, Jack & Chair 1996 (EJC - CD)
- An Evening In The Company Of Vespertine 1997 (Vespertine - CD)
- A Mind Expansion Compilation 2007 (Mind Expansion - 2xCD)
