= Slipstream (band) =

English indie rock band

Slipstream are an English indie rock band, not to be confused with the American band "The Slipstream". They were formed in 1994 after Mark Refoy left Spiritualized, and released their single, "Sundown" the same year. The band consisted of Ian Anderson on guitar, Gary Lennon on bass, Steve Beswick on drums and occasional appearances from Jonny Mattock who had also stopped drumming for Spiritualized later that year. Over the following five years the band released two albums, Slipstream and Be Groovy Or Leave, and a compilation CD, Side Effects, all on Ché Trading.

In 1999, the band ceased recording after releasing a final single, "Everything And Anything", on the Enraptured label. The track featured on the soundtrack to the BBC Three sitcom, Ideal starring Johnny Vegas.

In 2004, Slipstream now down to a two-piece consisting of the former Spacemen 3 members, Mark Refoy and Jonny Mattock, decided to play live again, with the help of electronic augmentation. Both men reside in their home town of Northampton.

In January 2008, Slipstream released their new album Mantra as a download at www.northernstarrecords.co.uk. The twelve-track album was mixed by Pete Gleadall at his West London studio, Hoedown City. Mantra was released on CD on the Enraptured label on 27 October 2008. All songs were written by Mark Refoy and Jonny Mattock. The album Stereo Brain Mono Heart, was released in 2013 on the Mind Expansion label in the US.

He appeared alongside former Levitation and Dark Star guitarist Bic Hayes on the world tour for the Pet Shop Boys, including an appearance headlining the Live 8 concert, Moscow.

Refoy and Mattock have also played on the Freelovebabies album by former Spacemen 3/Spiritualized bassist Will Carruthers.

== Discography ==
=== EPs and singles ===
Year	Title	Label	Other information
1993	Sundown	Ché Trading (CHE14)	First Release (7" only)
1994	Your Presence	Ché Trading (CHE19)	Released on CD single (bagged) and 7"
1994	Feel Good Again	Ché Trading (CHE23)	Free With Initial Copies Of First Album
1995	Computer Love	Ché Trading (CHE21)	One Sided Pink Etched Vinyl 7"
1995	Up In Heaven	Ché Trading (CHE35)	
1995	Come Back	Ché Trading (CHE36)	
1997	Madeleine	Ché Trading (CHE73)	
1999	Everything And Anything	Enraptured Records	Final full band release

=== Albums ===
Year	Title	Label	Other information
1995	Slipstream	Ché Trading	Produced By Zion Train, Initial Copies On White Vinyl and Contained Free CHE 23 7"
1996	Side Effects	Ché Trading	Compilation of previous singles and b-sides
1997	Be Groovy or Leave	Ché Trading	
2002	Transcendental	Enraptured Records	Collection of four-track demos
2008	Mantra	Enraptured Records	
2013	Stereo Brain / Mono Heart	Mind Expansion Records	

=== Compilation albums ===
Year	Title	Label	Other information
1993	Does The Word Duh Mean Anything?	Ché Trading(CHE73)	Label compilation featuring Dart, 18th Dye, Magic Hour, Urusei Yatsura, Bardo Pond, Kirk Lake and Disco Inferno
