= Son de Mar (soundtrack) =

Son de Mar (Music from the Film by Bigas Luna)

Soundtrack album by Piano Magic
- Released: 6 August 2001
- Recorded: Woodbine Studios, Warwickshire
- Genre: Post-rock
- Length: 37:39
- Label: 4AD
- Producer: John A. Rivers and Matt Simpson

Piano Magic chronology
Artists' Rifles (2000)	Son de Mar (Music from the Film by Bigas Luna) (2001)	Writers Without Homes (2002)

Professional ratings
Review scores
Source	Rating
AllMusic	4/5 stars

Son de Mar is the fifth album by Piano Magic, released on 6 August 2001. It is the soundtrack to the film of the same name (translated into English as Sound of the Sea), directed by Bigas Luna. The album was also the band's first release on 4AD. It was reissued on vinyl for the first time by Public House Recordings in May 2016.

== Track listing ==
All tracks are written by Glen Johnson, Jerome Tcherneyan, Miguel Marin, and James Topham

No.	Title	Length
1.	"(Part I)"	6:13
2.	"(Part II)"	2:44
3.	"(Part III)"	2:06
4.	"(Part IV)"	1:31
5.	"(Part V)"	9:35
6.	"(Part VI)"	15:33
Total length:		37:39
