= Urusei Yatsura (band) =

Scottish rock band

- Also known as: Yatsura
- Origin: Glasgow, Scotland
- Genres: Alternative rock; indie rock
- Years active: 1993–2001
- Labels: Ché Trading, Oni Records, Rocket Girl
- Spinoffs: Projekt A-ko
- Members: Fergus Lawrie; Graham Kemp; Elaine Graham; Ian Graham

Urusei Yatsura were a Scottish rock band formed in Glasgow in 1993.

== History ==
Founding members Fergus Lawrie and Graham Kemp met in the summer of 1993, whilst attending the University of Glasgow. They recruited Elaine Graham as bassist, and the line-up was completed with the subsequent addition of Elaine's brother, Ian Graham, on drums. They took their band name from the manga Urusei Yatsura, written by Rumiko Takahashi.

Their first recording, "Guitars Are Boring" was a contribution to a compilation album released by the Kazoo Club. This was based in Glasgow, and run at one point by the future Franz Ferdinand singer Alex Kapranos.

This record in turn brought them to the attention of the BBC Radio DJ John Peel, who brought them in to do a session in 1994. They recorded four Peel Sessions, between Glasgow and Maida Vale Studios, as well as appearing on the Evening Session for Steve Lamacq.

They released three albums: We Are Urusei Yatsura (1996), Slain By Urusei Yatsura (1998) and Everybody Loves Urusei Yatsura (2000). Albums in America and Japan were released under the name of Yatsura for legal reasons. The band had one Top 40 hit single, 1997's "Hello Tiger", which reached number 40 in the UK Singles Chart. Other singles released by the band include "Strategic Hamlets" and "Slain By Elf".

Urusei Yatsura split in June 2001, leaving Kemp to work on solo material and the other band members to form Projekt A-ko. In 2011, Lawrie formed the three-piece band, Angel of Everyone Murder, with Sarah Glass and Lea Cummings on bass, and released a self-titled double album on Kovorox Sound. The release featured six drone compositions of 15–20 minutes each, made with self-modified guitars he called HALO guitars. In 2012, Angel of Everyone Murder 2 was released.

In 2016, Rocket Girl released a 'best of' album called You are my Urusei Yatsura, consisting of recordings they had made for the BBC sessions.

In 2020, a compilation of b-sides and rarities, Can You Spell Urusei Yatsura - Lost Songs 1993-2000, was released.

== Discography ==
=== Albums ===
- We Are Urusei Yatsura (1996) Ché Trading / (2023 expanded remaster) Rocket Girl
- Slain by Urusei Yatsura (1998) Ché Trading
- Everybody Loves Urusei Yatsura (2000) Oni Records

=== Live ===
- You are my Urusei Yatsura (2016) Rocket Girl

=== EPs ===
- All Hail Urusei Yatsura (1994)
- Yon Kyoku Iri (1999) (CD / double 7-inch: "Kaytronika"/"Still Exploding"/"Nobody Knows We're Stars"/"Mother of the MBK")

=== Compilations ===
- ¡Pulpo! (1997)
- Can You Spell Urusei Yatsura - Lost Songs 1993-2000 (2020)

=== Singles ===
- "Siamese" (1995 - Ché 38 - 7-inch - "Siamese" / "Lo-Fi")
- "Pampered Adolescent" (1995 - M.I.R. 001 - 7-inch - "Pampered Adolescent" - split single Blisters)
- "Stolen Ecstasy 45 Chapter 3" (1995 - DAWN-03 - 7-inch - "Silver Krest" - split single Delgados)
- "Kernel" (1995 - PUBE08 - 7-inch - "Kernel" / "Teen Dream")
- "Plastic Ashtray" (1995 - Ché 46 - CD / 7-inch - "Plastic Ashtray" / "Got the Sun" / "Miramar" (CD) / "Yatsura Kill Taster" (CD))
- "Kewpies Like Watermelon" (1996 - Ché 53 - CD / 7-inch - "Kewpies Like Watermelon" / "Majesty" / "Sucker" (CD) / "Burriko Girl" (demo) (CD))
- "Tour EP" (Ché 59 - 7-inch - "Phasers on Stun" (live))
- "Phasers on Stun" (1996 - Ché 62 - CD / double 7-inch - "Phasers on Stun" / "The Power of Negative Thinking" / "The Love That Brings You Down" / "Sid & Nancy")
- "Strategic Hamlets" (1997 - Ché 67 - CD / 7-inch (×2) - "Strategic Hamlets" / "Down Home Kitty" / "Kozee Heart" / "Revir")
- "Fake Fur" (1997 - Ché 70 - CD1/10"/7" - "Fake Fur" / "Silver Krest" / "Nova Static" (not 7-inch) / "Secret Crush" (not 7-inch))
- "Fake Fur" (1997 - Ché 70 - CD2/10" "Fake Fur" / "Pampered Adolescent" / "Bewitched" / "Saki & Cremola")
- "Hello Tiger" (1997 - Ché 75 - CD1/7-inch - "Hello Tiger" / "Vanilla Starlet" / "Vent Axial" (not 7-inch)
- "Hello Tiger" (1997 - Ché 75 - CD2 - "Hello Tiger" (Peel session version) / "Dice, Nae Dice" (Peel session version) / "Everybody Hang Out")
- "Slain By Elf" (1998 - Ché 80 - CD1 "Slain By Elf" / "Subatomic" / "Nu Style")
- "Slain By Elf" (1998 - Ché 80 - CD2 / 7-inch "Slain By Elf" / "Hail To The New Poor" / "What's Wrong With Me?")
- "Louche 33" (2000 - ONIV71 - CD / 7-inch - "Louche 33" / "Planet Of The Skulls" / "I'm Vexed")
- "Eastern Youth" (2000 - ONIV73 - 7-inch - "Eastern Youth" / "The Hearts You Break")

=== Compilation appearances ===
- "Guitars Are Boring" on Kazoo Collection 12-inch
- "First Day on a New Planet" on Camden Crawl II CD
- "Kozee Hearts" on Noises From the Sound Cupboard 12-inch
- "Powerball" (demo) and "Black Hole Love" (demo) on Does The Word 'Duh' Mean Anything To You? CD
- "Exidor" (live) on Abuse Your Friends CD
- "Phasers on Stun" on Japanese Magazine CD
- "Skull in Action" on NME C96
- "Plastic Ashtray" (live) on Phoenix: The Album
- "Plastic Ashtray" on Generation X - The Definitive Sound of 90s Indie
- "Low Fi" on 12 into 10 cassette

==== Projekt A-ko ====
- "Elkloft" (vinyl, Piloft Recordings 2006)
- "Yoyodyne" (CD, 20 April 2009)
- "Project A-ko" / Horowitz (split 7-inch)
