= ¡Pulpo! =

Compilation album by Urusei Yatsura
- Released: 1997
- Genre: Indie rock
- Label: Primary

Urusei Yatsura chronology
We Are Urusei Yatsura (1996)	¡Pulpo! (1997)	Slain by Urusei Yatsura (1998)

¡Pulpo! is a collection of singles and B-sides by Glaswegian lo-fi rock indie band Urusei Yatsura, released in 1997.

== Track listing ==
1. "Strategic Hamlets" - 2:37
2. "Down Home Kitty" - 3:39
3. "Pampered Adolescent" - 5:54
4. "Kozee Heart" - 3:12
5. "Miramar" - 3:03
6. "Saki & Cremola" - 5:17
7. "Fake Fur" - 3:05
8. "Silver Krest" - 3:17
9. "Got the Sun" - 4:00
10. "Nova Static" - 3:06
11. "Revir" - 4:05
12. "The Power of Negative Thinking/The Love That Brings You Down" - 10:45

original release dates:
1995 3, 8, 9
1996 12
1997 1, 2, 4, 5, 6, 7, 10, 11
