= Ger FitzGerald (musician) =

Gerald "Ger" FitzGerald (born 19 November 1970) played bass for Setanta Records band Catchers. In 1999, he was hired as general manager of Stratosphere sound, a recording studio founded by James Iha (Smashing Pumpkins), Adam Schlesinger (Fountains of Wayne, Ivy) and Andy Chase (Ivy, Brookville). During this period, FitzGerald also ran Scratchie Records, Iha and Schlesinger's boutique record label, overseeing releases by artists such as The Frogs and Dan Bryk.

In late 2000, FitzGerald started working with the New York group Hem. During FitzGerald's tenure as Hem's manager, the band released two albums, Rabbit Songs and Eveningland.
