= Jeans Team =

German electronic music group

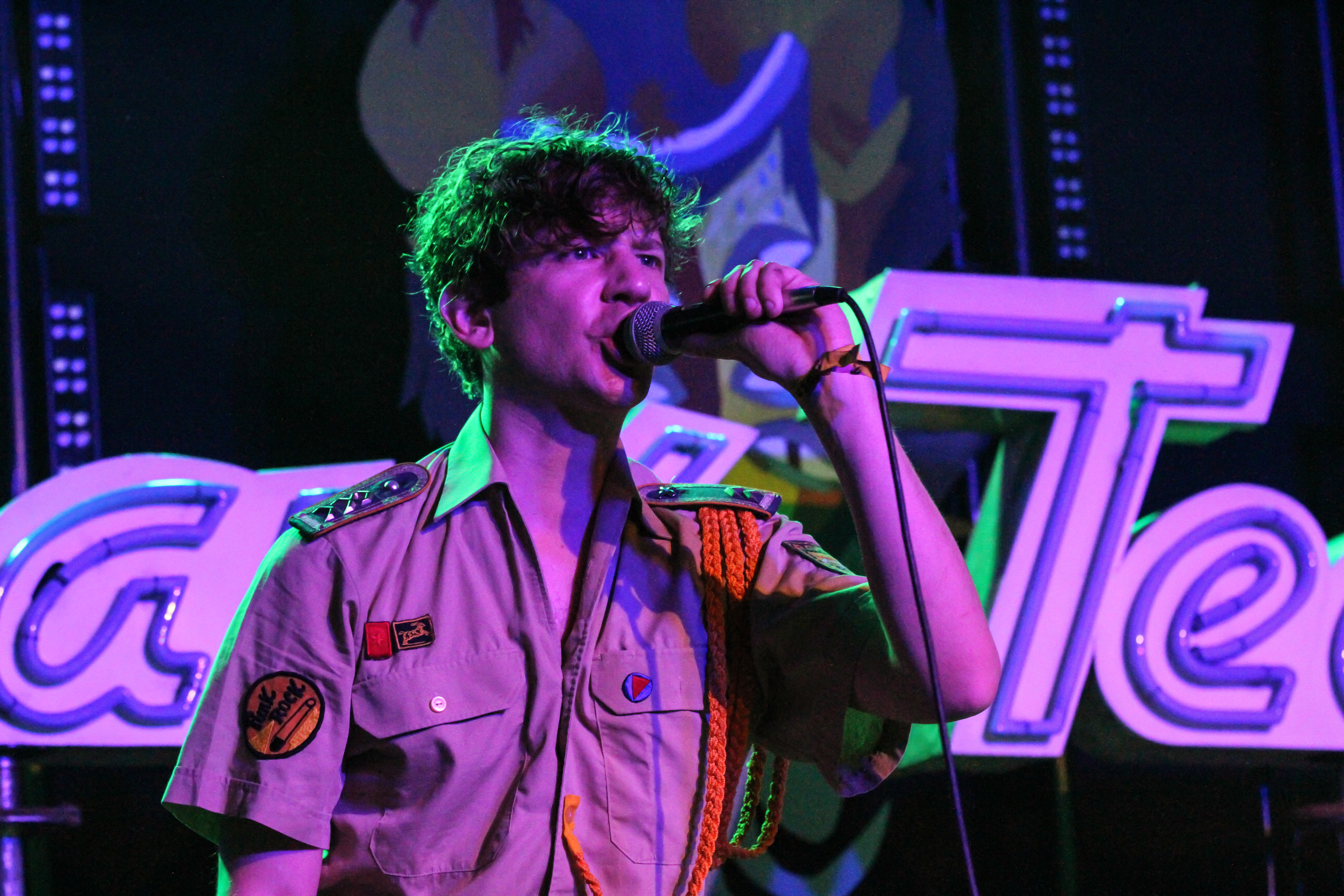

Background information
- Origin: Wedding, Berlin, Germany
- Genres: Electronic
- Years active: 1995–present
- Members: Franz Schütte; Reimo Herfort
- Past members: Gunther Kreis; Henning Watkinson
- Website: www.jeansteam.de (en)

Jeans Team are a Berlin-based electronic music group. The group was founded by Franz Schütte and Reimo Herfort 1995 in the borough of Wedding and started as a duo as a video art performance group.

== History ==
Jeans Team took their name from a blue and white curved neon sign that hung on a street in the Wedding district above a shoe shop that had previously sold jeans. In 1996, Franz Schütte and Reimo Herfort helped to set up Galerie Berlintokyo, a multi-purpose gallery and performing artspace at Hackescher Markt in Berlin. Early shows performed in the venue by Schütte and Herfort's consisted of a pre-produced 45-minute video film called Baby, to which they contributed electronic sounds. The performance was recorded on VHS, were subsequently sold in the gallery with each video cassette inserted in a self-sewn bag made of denim.

In 1997, Gunther Kreis and Henning Watkinson joined founders Schütte and Herfort. In 1999, the Jeans Team recorded their debut album Ding Dong and after the release in June 2000 on Kitty-Yo they toured Germany.. Following the release Jeans Team performed a number of concerts at music festivals including the 2000 Benicàssim Festival, 2001 Roskilde Festival and Melt Festival.

Jeans Team would split with Kitty-Yo records when long time collaborator Patrick Wagner left the company. They spent 2002 and 2003 without a label working on their second album. During this time, they were featured on John Peel Sessions at Maida Vale, prior to a multi-date tour of Russia organised by the Goethe Institute. In 2005, after joining Wagner's new record label Louisville Records, Jeans Team released Musik von oben. By the end of the year, Jeans Team had recorded and released the album Kopf auf.

By 2009, Watkinson left the group citing fatigue. Keine Melodien was featured in a commercial for the new Volkswagen Golf later in the same year.

Schütte and Herford, who also perform as the DJ duo Tracht & Prügel, began to re-release their back catalogue in 2017, along with previously unreleased recordings.

== Discography ==
	Year	Title	Type
	1998	"Ein Atom"	Single
	1998	"Hi Fans"	Single
Jun	2000	Ding Dong	Album
Nov	2000	"Keine Melodien"	Single
	2002	"Gold Und Silber"	Single
Oct	2004	"Berlin Am Meer"	Single
Feb	2005	Musik von oben	Album
	2005	"Oh Bauer"	Single
Oct	2006	"Das Zelt"	Single
Dec	2006	Kopf auf	Album
	2013	Das ist Alkomerz	Album
