= The Best of Drugstore =

Greatest hits album by Drugstore
- Released: 9 September 2013
- Recorded: 1995–2013
- Genre: Indie rock, alternative rock, dream pop
- Label: Cherry Red Records
- Compiler: Drugstore

Drugstore chronology
Anatomy (2011)	The Best of Drugstore (2013)

The Best of Drugstore is a best of compilation by dream pop band Drugstore, which was released in September 2013 on Cherry Red Records.

== Background ==
The record combines a selection of 20 songs taken from the band's previous four albums, and includes an exclusive version of 'I Know I could' recorded especially for this collection, a previously unreleased version of 'No More Tears', a remastered version of 'Wayward Daughter, and a new version of 'Say Hello' recorded especially for this Best Of. The songs and artwork were put together by Isabel Monteiro, with direct input from their fanbase.

== Track listing ==
1. "Devil"
2. "El President" (featuring Thom Yorke)
3. "Sweet Chili Girl"
4. "Alive"
5. "I Know I Could"
6. "Navegando"
7. "Solitary Party Groover"
8. "Accelerate"
9. "No More Tears"
10. "Superglider"
11. "The Night the Devil Came to Me"
12. "Sinner's Descent"
13. "Song for Pessoa"
14. "Little Girl"
15. "White Magic for Lovers"
16. "Wayward Daughter"
17. "The Party is Over"
18. "Saturday Sunset"
19. "The Funeral"
20. "Clouds"

Secret track

1. "Say Hello - Hobosville"
