= White Magic for Lovers =

Studio album by Drugstore
- Released: 4 May 1998
- Studios: El Cortijo studios, Spain
- Genres: Alternative rock, dream pop, Britpop
- Length: 51:34
- Label: Roadrunner
- Producers: Clive Martin, Drugstore

Drugstore chronology
Drugstore (1995)	White Magic for Lovers (1998)	Songs for the Jet Set (2001)

Singles from White Magic For Lovers
- 1. "Mondo Cane" Released: 8 November 1996; 2. "El President" Released: 20 April 1998; 3. "Sober" Released: 22 June 1998; 4. "Say Hello" Released: September 1998

Professional ratings
Review scores
Source	Rating
AllMusic	4/5 stars

White Magic for Lovers is the second studio album released by the London-based band Drugstore. It reached the UK albums chart at number 45. The album was noted for the "Song for Pessoa", about the Portuguese modernist poet Fernando Pessoa, "The Funeral" and the song "El President", a duet between Isabel Monteiro and Radiohead's Thom Yorke, which reached the UK singles chart at number 20.

== Track listing ==
All tracks written by Isabel Monteiro; except "Sober" by Daron Robinson and Monteiro, "Never Come Down" by Robinson, and "Tips for Travelling" by Mike Chylinski.

No.	Title	Length
1.	"Say Hello"	3:30
2.	"Mondo Cane"	3:35
3.	"El President"	2:50
4.	"Sober"	4:05
5.	"I Know I Could"	4:10
6.	"Spacegirl"	4:25
7.	"Never Come Down"	4:13
8.	"Song for Pessoa"	3:42
9.	"I Don't Wanna Be Here Without You"	3:40
10.	"White Magic for Lovers"	4:26
11.	"Tips for Travelling"	2:08
12.	"The Funeral (But Most of All)" (includes hidden track "Everything a Girl Should Have")	10:50

== Personnel ==
Personnel per booklet.

Drugstore

- Daron Robinson – guitar, vocals
- Isabel Monteiro – vocals, bass
- Mike Chylinski – drums
- Ian Burdge – cello

Additional musicians

- Thom Yorke – vocals on "El President"
- The Mariachi Band of Orlando Rincon – "Say Hello"
- Terry Edwards – horns on "Never Come Down"
- Mike Kearsey – horns on "Never Come Down"
- Ollie Kraus – cello on "I Know I Could" and "I Don't Wanna Be Here Without You"
- James Banbury – cello on "Mondo Cane"; keyboards on "Never Come Down" and "The Funeral (But Most of All)"
- Kathleen Chylinski – violin on "Tips for Travelling"

Production

- Clive Martin – producer, recording
- Drugstore – producer
- Paul Reed – house engineer
- Lee Butler – house engineer
- Doug Cook – house engineer
- Adi Winman – house engineer
- Tom Rixton – house engineer
- Lem Lattimer – house engineer
- Ray Lombard – band shots
- Andy Willsher – centrefold
- Isabel Monteiro – artwork, voodoo dolls

== Charts ==
Chart (1998)	Peak position
UK Albums Chart	45
