= Tripmaster Monkey (band) =

American indie rock band

Tripmaster Monkey, 1996

Tripmaster Monkey is an indie rock band from the Quad Cities in Illinois and Iowa. Members of the band are originally from Davenport, Iowa, Rock Island, Illinois, and East Moline, Illinois. They broke up in 1996 after a long American tour. They played straightforward guitar-driven rock, influenced by punk, grunge and other alternative or college rock. The name is a reference to the novel, Tripmaster Monkey.

Lead guitarist Jamie Toal currently resides in Chicago, IL and used to perform as part of the band Tenki. Lead vocalist Chris Bernat still resides in the Quad-Cities and performs with his band, Chrash. Bassist Wes Haas currently resides in Portland, OR. Drummer Marty Reyhons briefly played drums with another Quad-City band, Einstein's Sister.

The cover art for Tripmaster Monkey's album, Practice Changes, was done by Pete Schulte.

Their single "Present Tense" appeared on the soundtrack for the 1993 film Naked in New York.

In 2019, Tripmaster Monkey reunited and recorded their third full-length album, My East is Your West.

== Line-Up ==
Band members:

- Chris Bernat, vocals
- Jamie Toal, guitars
- Wes Haas, bass
- Marty Reyhons, drums

== Discography ==
- Faster than Dwight (EP, 1993) See How/Warner Bros.
- Present Tense (EP, 1993) Che 7
- Goodbye Race (LP, 1994) Reprise/Sire
- Practice Changes (LP, 1996) Sire
- Bright Orange End (EP, 2000) Independent release
- My East is Your West (LP, 2019)
