= Drugstore (band) =

Alternative and dream pop band

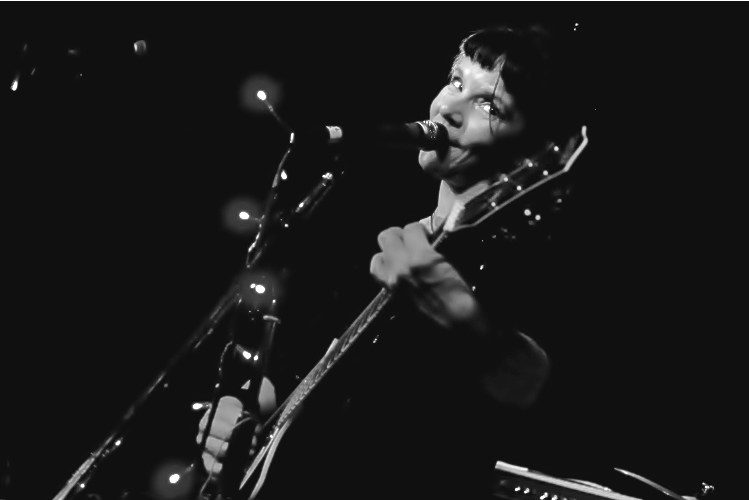
- Drugstore, live at the Lexington, 2012

Background information
- Origin: London, England
- Genres: Alternative rock, dream pop, Britpop
- Years active: 1993–2002, 2009–present
- Labels: Go! Discs; Roadrunner; London; Rocket Girl; Cherry Red
- Members: Isabel Monteiro; Peter Allinson; Nils Eyre; Steve Dixon
- Past members: Daron Robinson; Mike Chylinski; Dave Hunter; Lee Moulds
- Website: drugstoreband.blogspot.com

Drugstore are a London-based alternative and dream pop band, led by Brazilian singer-songwriter and bassist Isabel Monteiro (born 9 September 1965, São Paulo, Brazil), formed with Dave Hunter (later replaced by Daron Robinson) on guitar and Mike Chylinski on drums.

The band's name is taken from the 1989 Gus Van Sant film Drugstore Cowboy.

== Career ==
=== Formation and Drugstore (1993–1995) ===
The band was formed via a flat-share in East London, when Monteiro and American drummer Mike Chylinski met. They were joined by guitarist Dave Hunter and soon released their debut single, "Alive", on their own label Honey Records in 1993. The following year Hunter was replaced by Daron Robinson, and after only a handful of gigs, the band signed a major record deal with Go! Discs. Their debut album Drugstore was released on 27 March 1995 and it reached number 31 in the UK Albums Chart. The following three years were spent touring with Radiohead, Tindersticks, Jeff Buckley and The Jesus and Mary Chain, and playing at festivals such as Reading and Glastonbury.

=== White Magic for Lovers, Songs for the Jetset and hiatus (1997–2002) ===
Following the sale of Go! Discs to PolyGram, the band signed to Roadrunner Records and began work on their second album, White Magic for Lovers, which was recorded at El Cortijo, in Spain, the music studio run by Trevor Morais, Björk's drummer. The album was released on 9 June 1998, peaking in the UK Chart at No. 45, and also landing the band their first top 20 hit single with "El President", a duet with Thom Yorke, a tribute to former Chilean president Salvador Allende, who was ousted in a 1973 coup d'état.

In 2000, the band signed to Global Warming Records and recorded their third album, Songs for the Jet Set, at Battery Studios in London. The track "Baby, Don't Hurt Yourself" featured Lambchop's Paul Niehauss on pedal-steel. Whilst promoting the album, Monteiro decided to 'walk away from it all', and the band went into an eight-year hiatus. Drugstore Collector Number One, a compilation of b-sides and outtakes, intended initially as a fan-only recording, was subsequently released commercially by the label in 2002.

=== Reformation and Anatomy (2009–present) ===
In September 2009, the band reappeared with a reunion gig at Dingwalls, London. Early in 2010, Monteiro announced a revamped line-up, and performed at the Institute of Contemporary Arts (ICA) in London, on 5 May 2010. The following summer the band performed at Glastonbury Festival, for the charity 'Attitude is Everything', and at the Secret Garden Party Festival in Huntingdon.

In October 2010, Drugstore signed a one-off recording contract with the London-based indie label Rocket Girl, and in 2011 the band's fourth album, Anatomy, was released. The BBC said "The odds would have been long that, 18 years after their formation, they would reappear with some of their strongest material. Drugstore have been both placed at the dreamier end of the indie spectrum and compared with Leonard Cohen. Anatomy shows that there's more of an overlap there than one might have imagined".

In 2012 the band performed outside London for the first time in over a decade, with shows at the Trades Club, in Hebden Bridge, and at the Norwich Arts Centre, in Norwich.

The band returned in 2013 with a sold-out gig on 18 January at St Pancras Old Church.

To commemorate their 20th anniversary in September 2013 the band released The Best of Drugstore via Cherry Red Records, a compilation of tracks spanning the band's career with a selection of songs from their previous four albums. The album was launched with a sold-out show at London's Soho nightclub Madame Jojo's.

In early 2015, Isabel Monteiro moved to her hometown of São Paulo, Brazil, and with the help of local musicians, performed a string of selected dates.

=== Soundtracks ===
Drugstore's music has been featured on four film soundtracks. "Superglider", from the album Drugstore, is used on All Over Me, and House of America, both released in 1997. "Fader", also from Drugstore, is featured on the credits of the 2000 film Cherry Falls.

"Old Shoes", originally written and performed by Tom Waits from the album Step Right Up: The Songs of Tom Waits, is used in the 2004 film East of Sunset. The band's music was also featured throughout the BBC series This Life, whose music producer was Ricky Gervais, and on the Channel 4 TV series Teachers.

== Discography ==
Studio albums

- Drugstore (1995)
- White Magic for Lovers (1998)
- Songs for the Jet Set (2001)
- Anatomy (2011)
