= Ché Trading =

UK independent record label

- Industry: Music and entertainment
- Genre: Electronica, alternative country, ambient, art rock, space rock, dream pop, shoegazing, indie rock
- Headquarters: London, United Kingdom

Ché Trading was an independent UK record label co-founded by Vinita Joshi and Nick Allport, and was responsible for releasing the music of Disco Inferno. Other artists on their roster included the Tindersticks, Füxa, and Slipstream. Ché was also responsible for two Top 40 hit singles by Lilys, "A Nanny in Manhattan" and Urusei Yatsura's 1997 track "Hello Tiger". The I label is an offshoot of Ché Trading, which specialises in alternative and left field releases.

== Discography ==
Title	Artist	Release year & reference
Entertainment / Arc in Round	Disco Inferno	1991 (che01)
Open Doors / Closed Windows	Disco Inferno	1991 (che02)
Science	Disco Inferno	1991 (che03)
In Debt	Disco Inferno	1992 (che04)
50 Dresses	Animals That Swim	1992 (che05)
Sugared-Up	Delta	1993 (che06)
Faster Than Dwight	Tripmaster Monkey	1993 (che07)
Camomile	Fur	1993 (che08)
Don't Know You're Born	Frost Suite	1994 (che09)
Whole Wide World / Fragile Stars	18th Dye	1994 (che10)
Shutters Closed	Tripmaster Monkey	1994 (che11)
Done	18th Dye	1994 (che12)
Sundown	Slipstream	1994 (che14)
Dive	18th Dye	1994 (che15)
St Petersburg	Fur	1994 (che16)
Joy Compilation	Various	1994 (che17)
After Tomorrow	Magic Hour	1994 (che18)
Your Presence	Slipstream	1994 (che19)
No Excess Is Absurd	Magic Hour	1994 (che20)
Computer Love	Slipstream	1994 (che21)
Slipstream	Slipstream	1995 (che22cd)
Feel Good Again II	Slipstream	1995 (che23)
Sleepless / And Before The First Kiss	Dart	1994 (che24)
Play w/ You / Gout S.F. / F	18th Dye	1995 (che25)
Tribute to a Bus	18th Dye	1995 (che26)
So, You Got Anything Else?	Kirk Lake	1995 (che27cd)
Doggie / Submarine	Dart	1995 (che28)
I Had A Thought / America	Magic Hour	1995 (che29)
Will They Turn You on Or Will They Turn on You	Magic Hour	1995 (che30cd)
Ché Trading Limited Presents... Majesty Crush And Spare Snare	Spare Snare / Majesty Crush	1995 (che31)
Hey Latasha / Mellow Noise U.S.A.	Seam	1995 (che32)
Bufo Alvarius, Amen 29:15	Bardo Pond	1995 (che33)
If There's Such A Thing As Angels / New Drunks	Bear / Bardo Pond	1995 (che34)
Up in Heaven	Slipstream	1995 (che35)
Come Back	Slipstream	1995 (che36)
Side Effects	Slipstream	1995 (che37)
Siamese	Urusei Yatsura	1995 (che38)
36 Cents An Hour	Dart	1994 (che39cd)
Does The Word Duh Mean Anything To You? - Another Ché Compilation CD	Various	1995 (che40)
Bugger / Protection	Dart	1995 (che41)
Rarly Voo / Losing My Grip	Ligament / Space Bike	1995 (che42)
Carrion	The Bardots	1995 (che43)
V-Neck	The Bardots	1995 (che44)
Bugs	Bear	1996 (che45)
Plastic Ashtray	Urusei Yatsura	1996 (che46)
Ché Trading Limited Presents...	The Golden Mile /The Delgados / Bis / Merzbow	1995 (che47)
Supercool	Backwater	1996 (che48)
Turn Me On, Dead Man / Punk Virtuoso	Exit / 30 Amp Fuse	1996 (che49)
Shady	Backwater	1996 (che50)
Returns Every Morning / Touch The Water	Lilys	1996 (che51)
Better Can't Make Your Life Better	Lilys	1996 (che52)
Kewpies Like Watermelon	Urusei Yatsura	1996 (che53cd)
We Are Urusei Yatsura	Urusei Yatsura	1996 (che54lp)
Taster	Various	1996 (che55)
Memory	Backwater	1996 (che56)
Angels Are Cool	Backwater	1996 (che57)
Disneytime	Bear	1996 (che58)
Tour Split EP	Mogwai / Backwater / Urusei Yatsura	1996 (che59)
Disco Sucks	Various	1996 (che60)
Angels vs. Aliens / Buzzsong	Dweeb / Mogwai	1996 (che61)
Phasers on Stun	Urusei Yatsura	1996 (che62)
Love in Amarillo / Avalanche	Lazerboy / The Zambonis	1996 (che63)
Things Look Better When I Think of You	Backwater	1996 (che64)
A Nanny in Manhattan	Lilys	1996 (che65)
Katia Movement #1	Superstar Disco Club	1996 (che66)
Strategic Hamlets	Urusei Yatsura	1997 (che67)
Wavelength And Divided	Transient Waves / Dakota Suite	1997 (che68)
Be Groovy Or Leave	Slipstream	1997 (che69)
Fake Fur	Urusei Yatsura	1997 (che70)
Skyscraper Island (The Motion Picture) / Moonshaft	Superstar Disco Club	1997 (che71)
Does Your Heart Go Boom	Helen Love	1997 (che72)
Madeleine / Healing Hands	Slipstream	1997 (che73)
Vent-Axia	Helen Love / Superstar Disco Club / Urusei Yatsura	1997 (che74)
Hello Tiger	Urusei Yatsura	1997 (che75)
Slain By Urusei Yatsura	Urusei Yatsura	1998 (che76)
A Nanny in Manhattan	Lilys	1998 (che77cd)
Better Can't Make Your Life Better	Lilys	1998 (che78)
Slain By Elf	Urusei Yatsura	1998 (che80cd1)
Rosie & Jim	Gel	1998 (che81)
Long Live The UK Music Scene	Helen Love	1998 (che82)
Love Your Early Stuff	Spare Snare	1999 (che83)
Catching Ants	Gel	1999 (che84)
Sunshine	Gel	1999 (che86)
Love And Glitter, Hot Days And Muzik	Helen Love	2000 (che87)
Does Your Heart Go Boom (Remixes)	Cuban Boys / Helen Love	2000 (che88)
Shifty Disco Girl	Helen Love	2000 (che89)
Jump Up And Down / Atomic Beat Boy	Helen Love	2000 (che90)
Slipstream	Slipstream	1995 (che22lp)
So, You Got Anything Else?	Kirk Lake	1995 (che27lp)
Will They Turn You on Or Will They Turn on You	Magic Hour	1995 (che30lp)
36 Cents An Hour	Dart	1994 (che39lp)
We Are Urusei Yatsura	Urusei Yatsura	1996 (che54cd)
Fake Fur	Urusei Yatsura	1997 (che70cd1)
Fake Fur	Urusei Yatsura	1997 (che70cd2)
Hello Tiger	Urusei Yatsura	1997 (che75cd1)
Slain By Elf	Urusei Yatsura	1998 (che80cd2)
Kewpies Like Watermelon	Urusei Yatsura	1996 (che53)
