= Songs for the Jet Set =

Studio album by Drugstore
- Released: February 2001
- Recorded: 2000
- Genre: Alternative rock, dream pop
- Label: Global Warming
- Producer: Drugstore

Drugstore chronology
White Magic for Lovers (1998)	Songs for the Jet Set (2001)	Anatomy (2011)

Singles from Songs For The Jet Set
- 1. "I Wanna Love You Like A Man" Released: October 2000; 2. "Song For The Lonely" Released: May 2001; 3. "Baby Don't Hurt Yourself" Released: November 2001

Professional ratings
Review scores
Source	Rating
AllMusic	4.5/5 stars
NME	4/5 stars
PopMatters	(favorable)

Songs for the Jet Set is the third studio album by the band Drugstore. It was recorded at Battery Studios in London in under two weeks, and the track "Baby Don't Hurt Yourself" features Paul Niehauss, from Lambchop, on pedal steel.

== Track listing ==
No.	Title	Length
1.	"Baby Don't Hurt Yourself"	4:50
2.	"Song For The Lonely"	3:50
3.	"I Wanna Love You Like A Man"	2:58
4.	"Navegando"	3:10
5.	"The Party Is Over"	4:36
6.	"Hate"	3:31
7.	"Little Girl"	3:36
8.	"Wayward Daughter"	3:51
9.	"Thin Air"	4:08
10.	"Allegro Ma Non Troppo"	2:28
11.	"Flying Down To Rio (plus hidden track)"	11:33

== Personnel ==
- Isabel Monteiro - bass, vocals, piano, acoustic guitar, artwork, lyrics
- Daron Robinson - electric guitar, acoustic guitar, vocals
- Mike Chylinski - drums, percussion, backing vocals
- Ian Burdge - cello, piano, keyboards, backing vocals
