= Backwater (band) =

American jazz fusion band

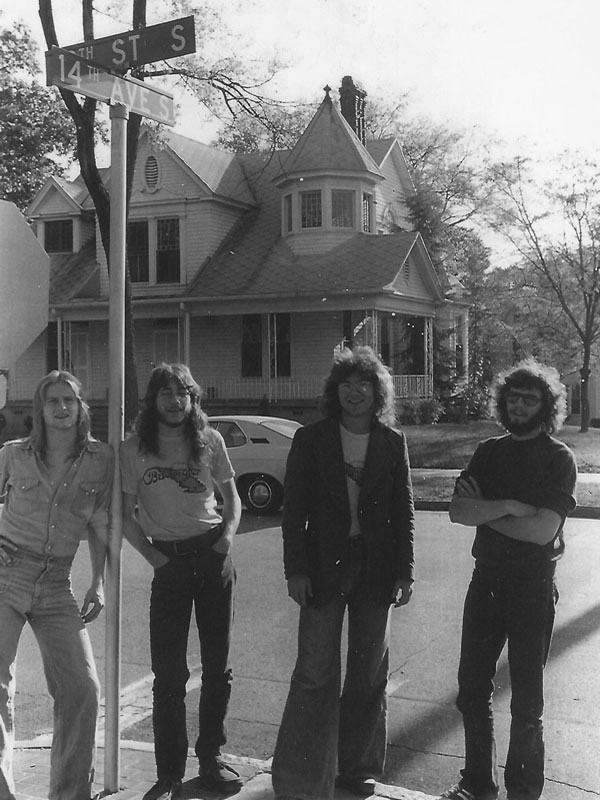

Background information
- Origin: Mobile, Alabama, U.S.
- Genres: Jazz; jazz fusion
- Years active: 1975–79, 1997 (reunion)
- Label: Bongwater
- Past members: Robby Catlin; Larry Hardin; Trippe Thomason; Scott Pettersen

Backwater was an American jazz fusion band formed in Mobile, Alabama, active in the 1970s. The band was formed by vocalist and bassist Robby Catlin. After relocating to Birmingham in 1975, the group became known for blending jazz, blues, rock, and Southern musical influences. Its best-known lineup included Catlin, saxophonist Larry Hardin, drummer Scott Pettersen, keyboardist Trippe Thomason, and guitarist Gerry Groom. The band released two independently produced albums: Backwater (1976) and North of the Mason-Dixon and the Heart of Dixie (1978).

Though Backwater never achieved national commercial success, the group's music received radio airplay throughout the southeastern United States and earned a devoted regional following. Their debut album's single "Alto Ego" became the band's most recognizable song, while the group shared stages with artists including B.B. King, Bonnie Raitt, and Emmylou Harris. The band's principal members reunited for a one-off concert in 1997, and its debut album was remastered and reissued on compact disc the same year.

== History ==
=== Formation and debut album (early to mid 1970s) ===
Backwater originated in the early 1970s as a Mobile, Alabama-based cover band founded by vocalist and bassist Robby Catlin. Initially performing Top 40 material as a trio with guitarist Bob Bishop, the group became a popular fixture at fraternity parties and high school dances throughout the Gulf Coast. In 1975, Catlin reunited with childhood friend Larry Hardin and assembled a new lineup that included Scott Pettersen, Steve Ferrell, Jim Reid, Jim Henderson, and Bishop. Several members had previously performed together in the middle school band Free Will. Seeking broader opportunities, the group relocated to Birmingham, Alabama, where it performed regularly at The Morris House nightclub.

As several members departed to return to college, Catlin, Hardin, and Pettersen recruited keyboardist Trippe Thomason, establishing the core lineup that would record the band's debut album. The group's musical direction shifted significantly following the arrival of guitarist Gerry Groom in early 1976. A former child prodigy who had studied under and performed with Duane Allman, Groom encouraged the band to move beyond cover material and develop an improvisational style rooted in jazz fusion, blues, and progressive rock. He also introduced the musicians to blues performer John Hammond Jr., whom they backed during a Birmingham concert. At the time, the band lived communally in a condemned house on Birmingham's south side and traveled in a converted bread truck. Drawing inspiration from artists such as Herbie Hancock, Weather Report, and the Mahavishnu Orchestra, Backwater began developing an original repertoire.

Rather than pursue a traditional recording contract, Catlin, Hardin, and Pettersen established their own independent label, Bongwater Records, after reportedly rejecting offers that would have required them to alter their musical direction. The band's members worked as session musicians at New London Recording in Homewood, Alabama, in exchange for studio time, allowing them to finance their debut album independently. Released in September 1976, Backwater featured a combination of studio recordings and live performances captured at the Birmingham nightclub The Midnight's Voice. During recording, rock musician Edgar Winter performed with the band at a live appearance and encouraged the group to pursue a national audience.

To promote the album, Backwater mailed copies directly to radio stations throughout the United States. The record received airplay across the South, including stations in Mobile, Auburn, Tuscaloosa, Montgomery, New Orleans, and Birmingham. The songs "Alto Ego" and "A Song for Don" emerged as the album's most successful radio tracks. The growing regional exposure helped the band secure opening performances for artists including B.B. King, Bonnie Raitt, and Emmylou Harris. Reviewing the album in The Auburn Plainsman, A.J. Wright wrote that Backwater challenged prevailing stereotypes about Southern music: "Southern popular music is often typecast as refried boogie produced by a faceless series of Allman Brothers clones [...] Backwater will soon change that false image."

=== Lineup change, second record and breakup (late 1970s) ===
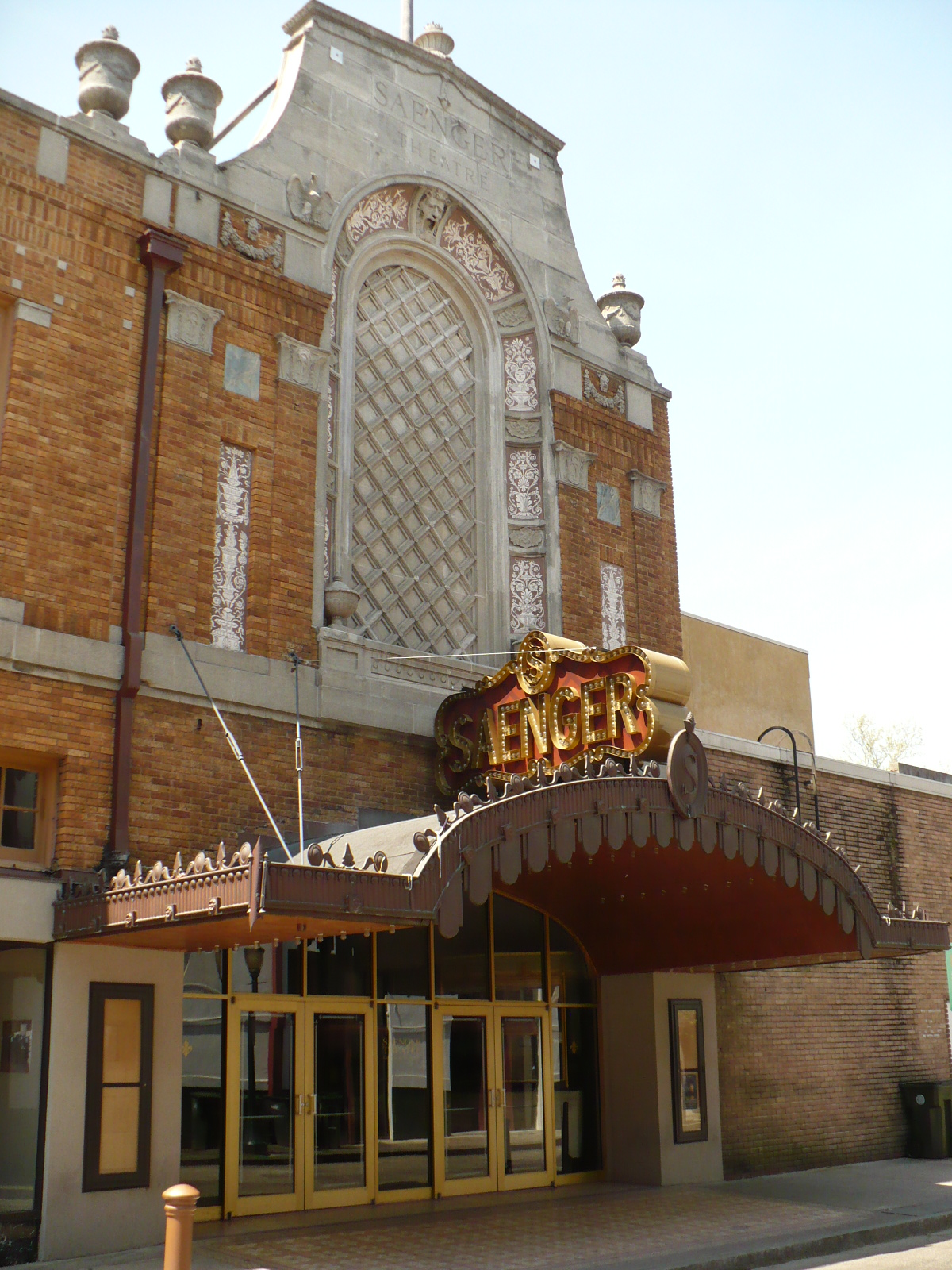
Mobile's Saenger Theatre, where Backwater recorded and later reunited in 1997.

In 1977, Hardin and Thomason left the group, citing creative differences. Hardin later reflected that internal tensions stemmed from "too many kids with too many egos." Catlin and Pettersen continued the band with a rotating cast of musicians, including Tom and Myra Woodruff, and recorded a second album, North of the Mason-Dixon and the Heart of Dixie, released in 1978. The album combined studio recordings made at Fifth Floor Recording Studios in Cincinnati, Ohio, during the Great Blizzard of 1978 with live performances recorded at Mobile's Saenger Theatre and Solomon Alfred's Night Club in Memphis, Tennessee. It also included a bonus extended play record, Punk Jazz, featuring a collection of experimental pieces. Like its predecessor, the release achieved modest regional success.

Backwater continued performing through the end of the decade with additional members, including Frank Garcia. The band's live repertoire blended original material with songs by artists such as John Coltrane, Herbie Hancock, Little Feat, and Billy Joel. Around this period, Hardin returned to the group, rejoining Catlin and Pettersen for the band's final years. Despite its musical versatility, the group struggled to fit neatly within the commercial categories favored by record labels. In a 1979 interview, Catlin remarked that the band's eclectic style made it difficult for the music industry to market them effectively. "Our basic problem is that our sound is too diversified," he asserted. "There is a recognizable style, but it's not real hip — to a record company — to go from a 1940's tune to a modern one. They don't quite know where to put us. They could put us in the funk category, but we're not quite enough commercial disco." The group dissolved shortly thereafter. Reflecting on the breakup, Pettersen later stated that the band had reached a point where it had become "just another bar band."

The band's principal members reunited for a one-night performance at Mobile's Saenger Theatre in 1997, sponsored by radio personality Catt Sirten. That same year, Backwater was remastered and reissued on compact disc. In subsequent years, the group lost several of its founding members, including co-founder Robby Catlin in 2006, drummer Scott Pettersen in 2021, and saxophonist Larry Hardin in 2026.

== Band members ==
Former members

- Larry Hardin – alto, tenor, and baritone saxophones, clarinet, flute, percussion (1975–77; 1979; 1997)
- Robby Catlin – bass guitar, vocals (1975–78; 1997)
- Trippe Thomason – keyboards (1975–77; 1997)
- Scott Pettersen – drums, percussion (1975–78; 1997)
- Gerry Groom – guitar (1976)
- Tom Woodruff – keyboards (1977–1979)
- Nick Rayner – drums (1979)
- Frank Garcia – congas (1979)
- Myra Woodruff – backing vocals (1977–1979)

== Discography ==
- Backwater (1976)
- North of the Mason-Dixon and the Heart of Dixie (1978)
