= Drugstore (album) =

Studio album by Drugstore
- Released: 27 March 1995
- Genre: Dream pop, Britpop
- Length: 42:56
- Label: Go! Discs, London
- Producer: Drugstore

Drugstore chronology
Drugstore (1995)	White Magic for Lovers (1998)

Singles from Drugstore
- 1. "Alive" Released: April 1993; 2. "Starcrossed" Released: September 1994; 3. "Nectarine" Released: 2 January 1995; 4. "Solitary Party Groover" Released: 6 March 1995; 5. "Fader" Released: 29 May 1995

Drugstore is the self-produced debut album by the Brazilian/British band Drugstore. It was released by Go! Discs in 1995 and it entered the UK chart at 31.

== Critical reception ==
Professional ratings
Review scores
Source	Rating
AllMusic	4.5/5 stars
Robert Christgau	(neither)

The Guardian likened the album to "Jesus and Mary Chain feedback meets Portishead's eerie languor."

== Track listing ==
1. "Speaker 12"
2. "Favourite Sinner"
3. "Alive"
4. "Solitary Party Groover"
5. "If"
6. "Devil"
7. "Saturday Sunset"
8. "Fader"
9. "Super Glider"
10. "Baby Astrolab"
11. "Gravity"
12. "Nectarine"
13. "Starcrossed"
14. "Accelerate"

== Personnel ==
- Mike Chylinski – drums
- Isabel Monteiro – bass, vocals
- Daron Robinson – guitar, piano
