= Piano Magic =

Musical collective scale

- Origin: London, England
- Genres: Indie rock, ambient pop, post-rock, indietronica
- Years active: 1996–2017
- Labels: Second Language; Make Mine Music; Important Records; Saint Marie Records; Talitres; Darla Records; Green UFOs; Monopsone Records; 4AD; Rocket Girl; Acuarela Records; Morr Music; Acetone Records; Lissy's Records; Bad Jazz Records; Staalplaat; Piao! Records; i (label); Ché Trading
- Members: Glen Johnson; Jerome Tcherneyan; Alasdair Steer; Franck Alba; Paul Tornbohm
- Past members: Dominic Chennell (musician); Dick Rance; Alexander Perls; Jen Adam; Ezra Feinberg; Charles Wyatt; Caroline Potter; Miguel Marin; John Cheves; Angèle David-Guillou; Cédric Pin
- Website: www.piano-magic.co.uk

Piano Magic was a musical collective formed in the summer of 1996 by Glen Johnson, Dominic Chennell, and Dick Rance in London, England. Their sound has been described as ambient pop, post-rock, indietronica, dark wave, "arty baroque pop" and "English radiophonic soundscapers". While later releases saw them operating in a traditional band format, they originally intended to base their recordings around their small nucleus and whoever else would like to contribute. Glen Johnson was the only remaining member from the original trio when the group disbanded in 2017.

== History ==
=== Formation and early years: 1996–1998 ===
Piano Magic was formed in the summer of 1996 by Glen Johnson, Dominic Chennell, and Dick Rance in London, as a 'bedroom-studio' project with the intention to base their recordings around their small nucleus and whoever else would like to contribute.

Originally reluctant to perform live, they gave way to label pressure when their first single proved popular on the BBC Radio 1 John Peel show and was awarded Single of the Week in Melody Maker. While recruiting Paul Tornbohm to play drums at these gigs, they pointedly refused to play or sound like any of their released material.

Popular Mechanics appeared on I (label)/Ché Trading in 1997, a debut album which the press variously described as "ethereal electro pop atmospheric soundscapes" or "simply delighting in... making silly noises" and which the band thought of as "Small Beat, pre-chip... radiophonics". It included vocals by Hazel Burfitt and Raechel Leigh but, with Rance having quit the band, combined two previous single releases with a set of new recordings by Johnson and Chennell.

The duo then briefly recruited American music students Alexander Perls, Jen Adam and Ezra Feinberg to complete the band, though Chennell too had departed by the time of the second album release Low Birth Weight in 1998, a record described as "dreamy, trance and organic psychedelia". It introduced the vocals of Caroline Potter, who would sing on one further album.

=== Mid-period: 1999–2004 ===
By 1999 only Johnson remained from the original trio, and the departure of Chennell left him free to lead the band into a much more conventional format and sound. A line-up of Glen Johnson, Miguel Marin, John Cheves and Paul Tornbohm recorded the third album, Artists' Rifles, with John A Rivers (producer of Dead Can Dance and Felt), and showcased its guitar-based sound, "a mixture of chiming guitars and processional rhythms", at the Benicassim and BAM music festivals. By now, Piano Magic was proving more popular abroad than in their homeland, and the next few years' activity included mainly European tours.

The band, now minus Cheves, signed to 4AD Records in 2000 and released the soundtrack for Spanish director Bigas Lunas' film Son de Mar in 2001, described as "ethereal, delayed guitar lines... accompanied by various ambient sounds."

Jerome Tcherneyan then replaced Miguel Marin on drums, and the second and last album with 4AD, Writers Without Homes in 2002, was released with mixed press reaction; "exquisite, if a touch diffident." Its myriad guest artists imported talents from Cocteau Twins, The Czars, Tarwater, Life Without Buildings and Tram. It also featured the first vocal recording for thirty-three years of lost '60s/'70s folk heroine Vashti Bunyan.

With the addition of Franck Alba and Alasdair Steer, The Troubled Sleep of Piano Magic was released in 2003 on the Green Ufos label, soliciting comparisons with This Mortal Coil and Durutti Column.

=== Final period: 2005–2017 ===
Cédric Pin joined Piano Magic in time for the 2005 album Disaffected with a melodic, nearly "pop" sound, featuring more guest vocal contributions from John Grant of The Czars and Angèle David-Guillou of Klima. It appeared to confirm a return to their 'exile' status, gaining significant attention abroad (including, for example, a full feature in the French daily Liberation) but with no coverage in any UK broadsheet or music magazine.

The album Part Monster was released in 2007 produced by Guy Fixsen of Laika.

In 2008, Piano Magic moved to Make Mine Music, an artist-run, artist-owned label collective, and released a new EP, Dark Horses, the last release to feature Cédric Pin.

In 2009, Piano Magic released their 10th official album, Ovations, with contributions by Brendan Perry and Peter Ulrich of Dead Can Dance.

In June 2012, the album Life Has Not Finished With Me Yet was released. Among the guests is Irons' Josh Hight, who contributes vocals on The Animals, Judas and A Secret Never Told.

Piano Magic's final album, Closure, was formally released by Second Language Music on 20 January 2017 worldwide on CD, 180 gm vinyl and digital download formats. The album features guest appearances from Peter Milton Walsh of The Apartments, Audrey Riley (go-to cellist for The Go-Betweens, Nick Cave, Virginia Astley and many more), Josh Hight (Irons) and Oliver Cherer (Dollboy).

The band's final concert was at The Lexington, Islington, London in December 2016, exactly 20 years to the day of their first ever concert at The Wag Club, Soho, London. The band's last line-up for recording and concerts was Franck Alba (guitar), Glen Johnson (guitar, voice), Alasdair Steer (bass), Paul Tornbohm (keyboards) and Jerome Tcherneyan (drums).

=== Related projects ===
Glen Johnson released a solo album, Details Not Recorded, under his own name in March 2009 on the Make Mine Music label. In 2014, he released a 3" postcard EP, Same Sex (Hibernate) and featured prominently on the Silver Servants eponymous album by a collective of artists from the Second Language Music label. In 2015, Johnson collaborated on an album (My Heart Has Run Out of Breath) and audio-visual live performances with the London-based Macedonian artist, Kristina Pulejkova.

Cédric Pin and Glen Johnson have recorded as Future Conditional. In 2018, they released a collaborative album, The Burning Skull (Second Language Music). Glen Johnson has also recorded under the name, Textile Ranch.

Angèle David-Guillou has recorded two albums under the name Klima ('Klima'- Peacefrog, 2007 and 'Serenades and Serinettes'- Second Language 2010). She has released two albums under her own name on the Village Green label : 'Kourouma' (2013) and 'En Mouvement' (2017).

Dominic Chennell has recorded as 'Dominic de Nebo' and with the group 'Carphology Collective'.

== Discography ==
=== Albums ===
- Popular Mechanics, (i/Che, 1997)
- A Trick of the Sea, (Darla, 1998)
- Low Birth Weight, (Rocket Girl, 1999)
- Artists' Rifles, (Rocket Girl, 2000)
- Son de Mar, (4AD, 2001)
- Writers Without Homes, (4AD, 2002)
- The Troubled Sleep of Piano Magic, (Green UFOs, 2003)
- Disaffected (Darla, 2005)
- Part Monster (Important, 2007)
- Ovations (Make Mine Music, 2009)
- Life Has Not Finished with Me Yet (Second Language, 2012)
- Closure (Second Language, 2017)

=== Compilations ===
- Seasonally Affective: A Piano Magic Retrospective 1996–2000 (Rocket Girl, 2001)
- Heart Machinery (A Piano Magic Retrospective 2001–2008) (Second Language, 2013)

=== Singles & EPs ===
- "Wrong French", (i/Che, 1996)
- "Wintersport", (i/Che, 1997)
- "For Engineers", (Wurlitzer, 1997)
- "Music for Rolex", (Lissy's, 1998)
- "There's No Need for Us to Be Alone", (Rocket Girl, 1998)
- "Fun of the Century", (Piao!, 1998)
- "Mort Aux Vaches", (Staalplat, 1998)
- "Music for Annahbird", (Piao!, 1998)
- "Amongst the Books, an Angel", (Acetone, 1999)
- "Panic Amigo", (Morr Music, 2000)
- "I Came to Your Party Dressed as a Shadow", (Acuarela, 2001)
- "Speed the Road, Rush the Lights", (Green UFOs, 2003)
- "Saint Marie EP", (Green UFOs, 2003)
- "The Opencast Heart EP", (Important Records, 2005)
- "Never It Will Be the Same Again" [Limited Edition of 100 copies], (EN/OF, 2006)
- "Incurable EP", (Important Records, 2006)
- "Dark Horses EP", (Make Mine Music, 2008)
- "Chemical EP", (Second Language, 2012)

=== Related releases ===
- Bird Heart in Wool, Textile Ranch (Very Friendly, 2005)
- Klima, Klima (Peacefrog, 2007)
- We Don't Just Disappear, Future Conditional (LTM, 2008)
- Brave New Wales, Various Artists (Fourier Transform, 2008)
- Details Not Recorded, Glen Johnson (Make Mine Music, 2009)
- Tombola, Textile Ranch (Very Friendly, 2009)
- Serenades and Serinettes, Klima (Second Language Music, 2010)
- Kourouma, Angèle David-Guillou (Village Green, 2013)
- Same Sex, Glen Johnson (Hibernate, 2014)
- My Heart Has Run Out of Breath, Glen Johnson/Kristina Pulejkova (Second Language Music, 2015)
- En Mouvement, Angèle David-Guillou (Village Green, 2017)
- The Burning Skull, Cédric Pin/Glen Johnson (Second Language Music, 2018)
- Isotech, Future Conditional (Second Language Music, 2022)
