= A Tiny House, In Secret Speeches, Polar Equals =

Studio album by Sweet Trip
- Released: May 28, 2021
- Genre: Glitch pop; dream pop
- Length: 69:30
- Label: Darla
- Producer: Sweet Trip

Sweet Trip chronology
You Will Never Know Why (2009)	A Tiny House, In Secret Speeches, Polar Equals (2021)	Seen / Unseen (2022)

Alternative cover
- Alternative cover, with the band members switching positions

A Tiny House, In Secret Speeches, Polar Equals is the fourth and final studio album by American experimental pop act Sweet Trip, released through Darla Records on May 28, 2021. The album was released 12 years after Sweet Trip's previous studio album, You Will Never Know Why.

The song "Walkers Beware! We Drive into the Sun" was released in January 2021 along with the announcement of the album. Sweet Trip describes the album as being heavily influenced by the shoegaze and electronic pop sounds of their previous albums.

== Background ==
Roberto Burgos and Valerie Cooper, the duo behind Sweet Trip, announced the band was taking a break in 2013. Their last full album, You Will Never Know Why, was released in 2009, 12 years before the release of A Tiny House, In Secret Speeches, Polar Equals. In May 2020, Sweet Trip released the song "In Sound, We Found Each Other". In January 2021, the duo released the single "Walkers Beware! We Drive into the Sun" and announced the release of A Tiny House, In Secret Speeches, Polar Equals as well as a reissuing of You Will Never Know Why. Before the release of A Tiny House, In Secret Speeches, Polar Equals, two of the band's previous albums, Velocity : Design : Comfort and You Will Never Know Why, were reissued.

On January 7, 2022, two bonus tracks were added to the album on streaming, originally being exclusive to a 7" vinyl which came as a bonus in some purchases of the album on vinyl.

== Composition and music ==
According to Sweet Trip's description of the album, it was "created out of the blue; nothing planned, not even a sense of direction" out of "strong emotions and pure love". The group says that the album was influenced heavily by their previous albums Halica: Bliss Out v.11, Velocity : Design : Comfort, and You Will Never Know Why in terms of technique and style.

== Reception ==
Professional ratings
Review scores
Source	Rating
AllMusic	3.5/5 stars

Sputnikmusic named A Tiny House, In Secret Speeches, Polar Equals the 8th-best album of 2021.

== Track listing ==
No.	Title	Length
1.	"Tiny Houses"	5:52
2.	"Surviving a Smile"	5:25
3.	"The Weight of Comfort, This Rain Is Comfort, This Rain Is You"	3:29
4.	"In Sound, We Found Each Other"	5:07
5.	"Chapters"	5:36
6.	"Eave Foolery Mill Five"	7:26
7.	"Snow Purple Treasures"	6:28
8.	"Come Spend the Night"	2:50
9.	"Randfilt"	3:50
10.	"You"	5:08
11.	"Walkers Beware! We Drive into the Sun"	3:41
12.	"Zafire Melts the Heart in Modulation"	1:58
13.	"Polar Equals"	6:38
14.	"At Last a Truth That is Real"	6:02
Total length:		69:30

=== Bonus 7" / digital tracks ===
No.	Title	Length
15.	"Here Comes the Sea"	3:16
16.	"Ravers Beware!"	2:39
Total length:		75:32
