= Measure =

Measure may refer to:

- Measurement, the assignment of a number to a characteristic of an object or event

== Law ==
- Ballot measure, proposed legislation in the United States
- Church of England measure, legislation of the Church of England
- Measure of the National Assembly for Wales, primary legislation in Wales between 1999 and 2011
- Assembly Measure of the Northern Ireland Assembly (1973)

== Sciences and mathematics ==
- Measure (data warehouse), a property on which calculations can be made
- Measure (mathematics), a systematic way to assign a number to each suitable subset of a given set
- Measure (physics), a way to integrate over all possible histories of a system in quantum field theory
- Measure (termination), in computer program termination analysis
- Measuring coalgebra, a coalgebra constructed from two algebras
- Measure (Apple), an iOS augmented reality app

== Other uses ==
- Measure (album), by Matt Pond PA, 2000, and its title track
- Measure (bartending) or jigger, a bartending tool used to measure liquor
- Measure (journal), an international journal of formal poetry
- "Measures" (Justified), a 2012 episode of the TV series Justified
- Measure (typography), line length in characters per line
- Coal measures, the coal-bearing part of the Upper Carboniferous System
- The Measure (SA), an American punk rock band
- Measure, an alternative term for bar (music)
- Harry Bell Measures (1862–1940), English architect

== See also ==
- Countermeasure, a measure or action taken to counter or offset another one
- Quantity, a property that can exist as a multitude or magnitude
- Measure for Measure, a play by William Shakespeare
