= The Twin Atlas =

American folk rock band

The Twin Atlas is a folk rock band, known for its atmospheric folk and pop songs, written and home-recorded by Sean Byrne with Lucas Zaleski, who began playing together when they met at the University of Delaware in the early 1990s and began releasing music as The Twin Atlas in 2000.

Zaleski is now an NYC resident, and Byrne lives in Medford Lakes, where he has drummed with the bands Lenola, Mazarin, Matt Pond PA, Audible, BC Camplight, and Camino Sound.

The foundation of their songs often comes from Byrne's compositions or from Byrne and Zaleski's recorded collaborations and improvisations, upon which Byrne later goes back to and finishes; adding vocals, additional melodies and instrumentation, and assorted sounds. This work process has proved prolific.

Their newest release is 2005's Sun Township, a ten-song set of haunting folk rock containing their most fully realized fidelity to date thanks to post-production by engineer Dave Grubb (Lenola, Like A Fox)

The Twin Atlas plays: acoustic and electric guitar, vocals, mandolin, keyboard, live and electronic drums, harmonica, banjo, effects, melodica, percussion, as well as whatever and whoever may be lying around at the time.
