= Dieppe Park =

Dieppe Park may refer to:

- Dieppe Park, Montreal
- Dieppe Park, one of the Parks in Windsor, Ontario
