= You Will Never Know Why =

Studio album by Sweet Trip
- Released: September 28, 2009
- Genres: Indie pop; dream pop
- Length: 56:20
- Label: Darla
- Producer: Sweet Trip

Sweet Trip chronology
Velocity : Design : Comfort (2003)	You Will Never Know Why (2009)	A Tiny House, In Secret Speeches, Polar Equals (2021)

Alternative cover
- 2021 remaster

Professional ratings
Review scores
Source	Rating
AllMusic	4/5 stars
PopMatters	7/10

You Will Never Know Why is the third album by American experimental pop act Sweet Trip, released on September 28, 2009, by Darla Records. It marks a departure from the electronic sounds of their previous releases, featuring more traditional song structures and a more mainstream indie pop sound throughout, incorporating elements from dream pop, and indie rock.

== Background ==
After the release of their second album, Velocity : Design : Comfort, Sweet Trip took a nearly three-year hiatus from performing and recording, lasting from 2004 to 2006. Roberto Burgos used this hiatus to improve his guitar playing, so that future recordings of songs would not need to rely so heavily on effects to hit the notes and chords he was aiming to play. In 2006, the band reformed, with founding member Viet Le leaving and Rob Uytingco joining to contribute live drums to performances and recordings.

Songs for the album developed from practice sessions where the band would play with just guitar alone, with them deciding that the more "raw and bare and simple" songs would be what they would focus on for their next album; the band agreed an attempt to recreate the sound of Velocity : Design : Comfort in particular would be a disservice to that album. The band also focused on making more traditional verse-chorus structured songs, whereas previous releases had the band building songs as they went, leading to long and unconventionally structured songs.

Burgos and Valerie Cooper have gone on record stating some of the songs had been in the works for many years prior to the album's release, with the song "Air Supply" written around the same time as "Dsco" from Velocity : Design : Comfort, which itself debuted live in 1999, four years prior to that album's release. Also written years earlier were the songs "Milk" and the intro and outro for "Acting", both of which were created around the same time as Velocity : Design : Comfort. The song "Silence", a bonus track from the 2021 remaster, was performed solo by Cooper at the 1999 wedding of the eponymous Darla of Darla Records; the owner of March Records, who was in attendance, told her that the band should write more songs like that, and that "it's better, people will like that better".

== Artwork ==
The original cover artwork for You Will Never Know Why features a razor blade, drawn by Aaron Porter. Burgos and Cooper were not sure what to do for the artwork, and eventually Porter drew the razor after much indecision, which the band went with for the final cover. Burgos has stated neither he nor Cooper were fans of the original artwork, nor the association with the razor and self-harm, so the band chose to create entirely new artwork alongside a short comic for the 2021 remaster.

The remaster's artwork features drawings of Burgos and Cooper lying around a portrait of a vampire, from the comic included in physical editions of the album. This artwork was met with criticism from fans, leading to Darla Records repressing versions of the remaster with the original razor artwork.

=== 2021 Remaster Comic ===
Physical editions of the 2021 remaster of You Will Never Know Why come with a short comic, with the story written by Cooper and artwork done by YobKiss. It follows an unnamed vampire, who sees an in-comic counterpart of Cooper writing her suicide note, about to kill herself with a razor with her name on it (based off the design of the razor on the original cover art). The vampire then flies through Cooper's window, biting her and turning her into a vampire, then taking her razor. He then places the razor in a case also containing a razor with Burgos's name on it, implying the same had happened to him too. The comic ends with Burgos and Cooper happily dancing together, both now vampires.

== Track listing ==
All tracks are written by Sweet Trip (Roberto Burgos and Valerie Cooper).

No.	Title	Length
1.	"Conservation of Two"	2:37
2.	"Air Supply"	4:30
3.	"Forever"	3:59
4.	"Acting"	7:05
5.	"Milk"	4:25
6.	"Darkness"	6:27
7.	"To the Moon"	4:10
8.	"Song About a Sea"	1:17
9.	"Song About a Sun"	1:43
10.	"No Words to Be Found"	2:42
11.	"Pretending"	4:43
12.	"Misfortunes Are Cruel"	4:16
13.	"Your World Is Eternally Complete"	4:22
14.	"Female Lover" (unlisted on original CD edition)	4:04
Total length:		56:20

2021 remaster bonus tracks
No.	Title	Length
15.	"Silence"	1:56
16.	"Where the Sunrise Dies, So Does the Echo of Your Voice"	5:34
17.	"Things to Ponder While Falling"	4:07
Total length:		67:57

== Personnel ==
Credits are adapted from the album's liner notes.

Sweet Trip

- Roberto Burgos – vocals, guitar, synthesizer, programming
- Valerie Cooper – vocals, guitar, synthesizer

Production

- Sweet Trip – production, mastering

Additional personnel

- Aaron Porter – bass, artwork
- Rob Uytingco – drums
