= Lenola =

Lenola may refer to:

- Lenola, Lazio - A town in Italy
- Lenola (band) - A rock band
- Moorestown-Lenola, New Jersey - A census-designated place near Philadelphia
