= Summer's Coming =

Summer's Coming may refer to:

== Songs ==
- Sumer Is Icumen In (also called the Summer Canon and the Cuckoo Song) a medieval English rota of the mid-13th Century
- Summer's Comin' (Clint Black song)
- "Summer's Coming", single by Fred (band) 2005
- "Summer's Coming", B-side to Everyone's Gone to the Moon by Jonathan King from the album Everyone's Gone To The Moon
- "Summer's Coming", song by Sean Watkins from Blinders On
- "Summer's Comin'", song by Ronnie Dawson (musician) 1960
- "Summer Is Coming", song by Labi Siffre from The Singer and the Song
- "Summer Is Coming", song by Matt Pond PA from The Nature of Maps
