= Mixer (album) =

Studio album by Desario
- Released: February 28, 2012
- Genre: Indie rock; indie pop
- Length: 48:52
- Label: Test Pattern
- Producer: Michael Yoas

Desario chronology
| Zero Point Zero (2009) | Mixer (2012) | Red Returns (2016) |

Professional ratings
Review scores
| Source | Rating |

Mixer is the second album by American indie rock band Desario, released in February 2012 on Test Pattern Records.

== Track listing ==
1. "Cement Sneakers"
2. "Call Out Your Rivals"
3. "Occasional Monsters"
4. "Develop Destroy"
5. "Ana Carlisle"
6. "Victoria Island"
7. "These Machines"
8. "Success (Is Ours)"
9. "Airline"
10. "June"

== Reviews ==
Mixer was picked by The Big Takeover as one of Jack Rabid's Best of 2012. But SoundXP's review was mixed, writing that "(another) band mixing The Jesus & Mary Chain, Pavement and Teenage Fanclub may not be what the world's been crying out for, but when it works well - as on 'Call Out Your Rivals' or 'Success (Is Ours)' - it's a treat to listen to."
