= I Thought You Were Sleeping =

I Thought You Were Sleeping EP

EP by Matt Pond PA
- Released: April 17, 2001
- Genre: Indie rock
- Label: File 13
- Producer: Brian McTear and Matt Pond

Matt Pond PA chronology
Measure (2000)	I Thought You Were Sleeping EP (2001)	This Is Not The Green Fury (2001)

I Thought You Were Sleeping EP is the follow-up to Matt Pond PA's second album Measure. It was released on April 17, 2001.

== Track listing ==
1. "Other Countries" – 3:24
2. "Put Your Hair Down" – 3:38
3. "St. Andrews" – 1:55
4. "I Thought You Were Sleeping" – 2:30
5. "Measure 5" – 3:46

== Personnel ==
- Jim Hosetter – cello
- Rosie McNamara-Jones – violin
- Brendan Kilroy – bass
- Mike Kennedy – drums, vibraphone
- Matt Pond – guitar, vocals, trumpet
- Rachael Dietkus – violin, vocals
- Steve Gunn – guitar
- Matt Werth – talk
- Mary Garito – vocals, talk
- Adela Smith – talk
- Julia Rivers – French horn
- Brian McTear – keyboards, guitar, bass, talk, vocals, credits

== Technical personnel ==
- Engineered by Brian McTear at MinerStreet/CycleSound
- Produced by Brian McTear and Matt Pond
- Mastered by John Baker at Maja Audio Group
