= Zero Point Zero =

Studio album by Desario
- Released: March 24, 2009
- Genre: Indie rock; indie pop
- Length: 33:25
- Label: Darla
- Producer: Desario, Michael Yoas

Desario chronology
Zero Point Zero (2009)	Mixer (2012)

Professional ratings
Review scores
Source	Rating
Exclaim!	(neutral)
PopMatters	6/10 stars

Zero Point Zero is the first studio album by the rock band Desario. It was released in 2009 on Darla Records. The album drew comparisons with Franz Ferdinand, Vampire Weekend, The Replacements, and the Smoking Popes.

== Track listing ==
1. "Nautical Ways"
2. "Late Sedan"
3. "Cane Cola"
4. "Fine Time"
5. "Drama Club"
6. "Smile With Your Mouth Closed"
7. "Houston"
8. "Rain and Gold"
9. "As I Recall"
10. "Sequoia Gee"

== Reviews ==
- babysue
