= If You Want Blood =

If You Want Blood may refer to:

- If You Want Blood (EP), a 2007 EP by Matt Pond PA
- If You Want Blood (album), a 2001 album by Mark Kozelek
- If You Want Blood You've Got It, a 1978 live album by AC/DC
- "If You Want Blood (You've Got It)", a song by AC/DC from Highway to Hell
