= Velocity : Design : Comfort =

Studio album by Sweet Trip
- Released: June 17, 2003
- Recorded: c. 1998–2003
- Genre: IDM; shoegaze
- Length: 73:25
- Label: Darla
- Producer: Sweet Trip

Sweet Trip chronology
Alura (1999)	Velocity : Design : Comfort (2003)	You Will Never Know Why (2009)

Singles from Velocity : Design : Comfort
- 1. "Design : 1" / "Dedicated" Released: 11 November 2003

Velocity : Design : Comfort (stylized as velocity : design : comfort.) is the second studio album by American experimental pop act Sweet Trip, released on June 17, 2003 by Darla Records.

== Background ==
Velocity: Design: Comfort was recorded at the home of Sweet Trip member Roberto Burgos. According to Burgos, the album was put together mainly using the DAW Cubase, although an early version of FL Studio (known at the time as Fruity Loops) was used to compose the track "Design : 1". Both Burgos and Sweet Trip bandmate Valerie Cooper performed vocals on a majority of the record, with Sue Mee contributing vocals to the song "To All the Dancers of the World, a Round Form of Fantasy".

Work on the album began as early as 1998, as early versions of the tracks "Dsco" and "Velocity" were staples of live shows in support of the band's previous album, Halica, in the late 90s to early 00s. Notably, both were performed alongside a version of "Dedicated" at SXSW 1999, with the lyrics of "Dsco" substituted by humming. Also predating the album by several years is the song "Fruitcake and Cookies", which appears on the track list of a cassette posted to Twitter by Burgos dating "sometime around 95 - 97".

== Title and artwork ==
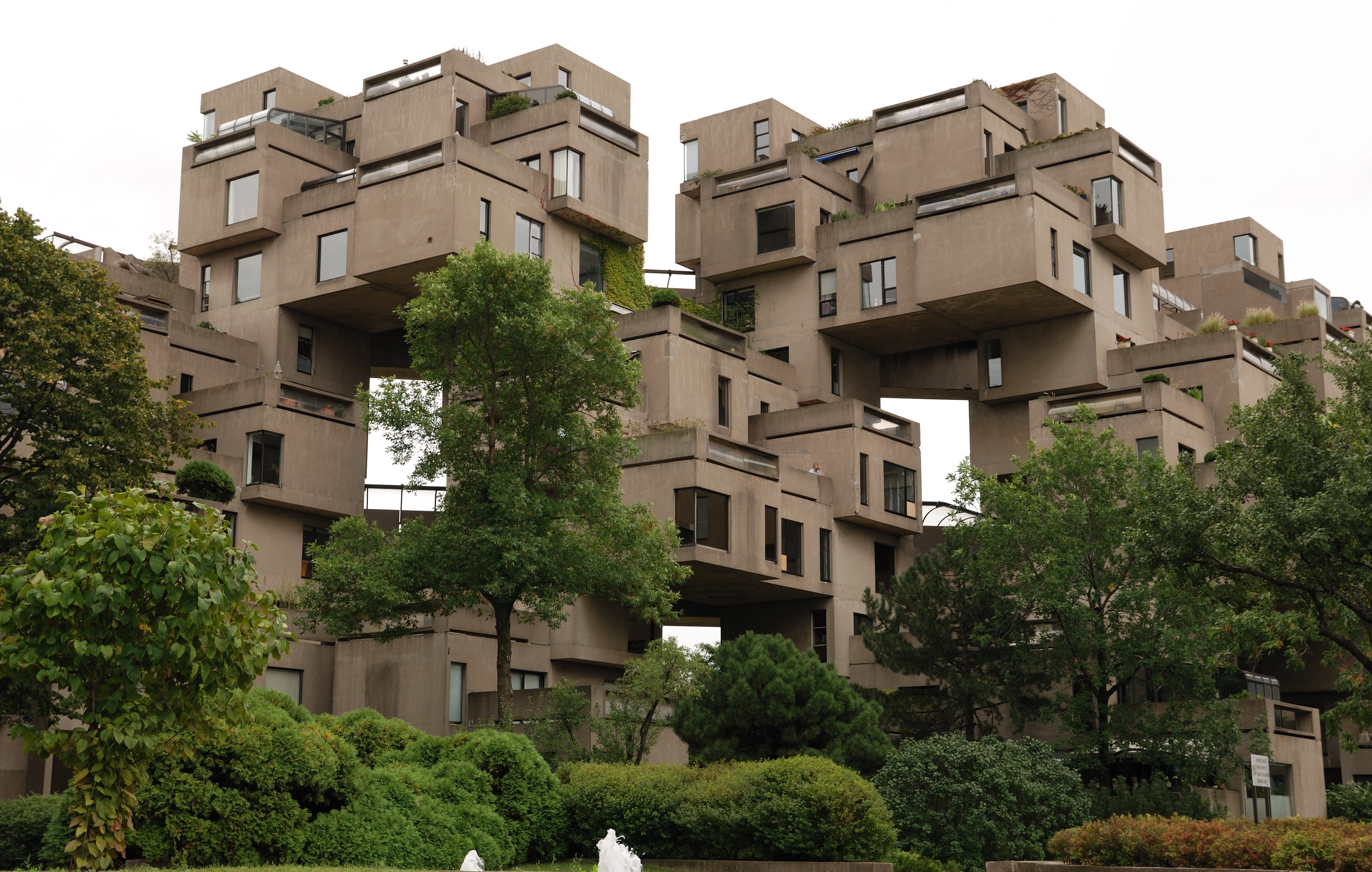
The Habitat 67 building is prominently featured in the album's artwork.

According to Burgos, Velocity : Design : Comfort was conceptually influenced by advertising and general consumerism, which is reflected in the album title – which he envisioned as a hypothetical slogan for a luxury car – and some of the track titles (including "Pro : Lov : Ad" and "Design : 2 : 3"). He interpreted the album as having "a recurring theme of convincing someone you love to leave it all behind, fall in love with you, and run away to an ideal world".

The cover artwork for Velocity : Design : Comfort features the Montreal housing complex Habitat 67. Burgos suggested that the album's themes are further reflected in the artwork's depiction of Habitat 67, which he described as "the ideal of a modern, modular building that is supposed to make lives better." Cooper offered a different perspective and said that she did not view the artwork as a representation of a "fictional world or idealized utopia", but was simply drawn to its simultaneously jarring and soothing quality. For the album's 2020 reissue, the cover artwork had to be recreated from scratch, as the source files for the original artwork had been lost. The band took this as an opportunity to address aspects of the cover that they "weren't keen on with the original."

== Composition ==
Sweet Trip's label Darla Records described Velocity : Design : Comfort as being "awash in ethereal Slowdive, Cocteau Twins, My Bloody Valentine guitars and vocals, Aphex Twin and Squarepusher leftfield electronic and acoustic beats, and ambience." AllMusic critic Tim Sendra compared its sound primarily to that of My Bloody Valentine. Burgos stated that much of Sweet Trip's music, especially on their earlier albums, is steeped in shoegaze influences, although "not always in an in-your-face kind of way." He said that he aimed for Velocity: Design: Comfort "to sound like flipping channels late at night and seeing and hearing all kinds of weird infomercials", keeping with the advertising theme explored on the album.

== Critical reception and legacy ==
Professional ratings
Review scores
Source	Rating
AllMusic	4.5/5 stars
laut.de	5/5 stars
Sputnikmusic	4.9/5

Velocity : Design : Comfort received little attention upon initial release, aside from reaching #179 on CMJ's New Music Monthly chart in August 2003. Reviewing the album for AllMusic, Tim Sendra praised it as "a record that is overflowing with small details and sonic surprises that make each song a delight and add up to push the record into minor classic status", while citing Sweet Trip as being part of a "charge" of artists that "make very forward-thinking records that confound expectations and don't leave the past (i.e., melody and songcraft) behind."

In the years after its release, Velocity : Design : Comfort gained a cult following on Internet music forums. In 2019, Far Out Magazine's Carly Wu listed it as the seventh best shoegaze album of all time, declaring that, "[o]f shoegaze and electronic experimentation, it's splendidly animated and fiercely unstoppable; all in all a multi-layered brain-melting listening experience." Acknowledging the wider audience the album had found, Darla Records reissued Velocity : Design : Comfort on CD and LP in 2020.

Speaking about the album's sudden resurgence in reputation, Burgos said, "It's really not something that we ever expected to happen ... It sorta fell through the cracks maybe for a lot of reasons, possibly because it was badly promoted, we didn't support any big shows or things like that, but also maybe because it was just too insane?"

== Track listing ==
All tracks are written by Sweet Trip (Roberto Burgos and Valerie Cooper).

No.	Title	Length
1.	"Tekka"	3:08
2.	"Dsco"	3:11
3.	"Velocity"	8:34
4.	"Fruitcake and Cookies"	7:58
5.	"Sept"	8:26
6.	"Pro : Lov : Ad"	5:46
7.	"Design : 1"	3:32
8.	"International"	10:22
9.	"Dedicated"	5:50
10.	"Chocolate Matter"	4:03
11.	"To All the Dancers of the World, a Round Form of Fantasy"	6:18
12.	"Design : 2 : 3"	6:17
Total length:		73:25

Note

- The track order for LP editions repositions "Chocolate Matter" between "Dsco" and "Velocity".

== Personnel ==
Credits are adapted from the album's liner notes.

Sweet Trip

- Roberto Burgos (credited as Roby) – instruments, programming, vocals
- Valerie Cooper (credited as Valerie Reyes) – vocals

Additional musicians

- Sue Mee – vocals on "To All the Dancers of the World, a Round Form of Fantasy"
- Aaron Porter – tablas on "Sept"

Production

- Kevin Bartley – mastering
- Sweet Trip – production, mixing

Design

- Elle – design^{[a]}
- Fortunato – design^{[a]}

=== Notes ===
1.Credited as "elle and fortunato [sic] at the simultaneous workshop".
