= Desario =

American indie rock band

- Origin: Sacramento, California, United States
- Genres: Indie rock Indie pop shoegaze
- Years active: 2004–present
- Labels: Darla Records; Test Pattern Records
- Members: Mike Carr (bass); John Conley (guitar, vocals); Kirklyn Cox (drums, percussion); Michael Yoas (guitar, keyboards)
- Past members: Jim Rivas (drums, percussion)
- Website: facebook page

Desario is an American indie rock band based in Sacramento, California.

== History ==
Desario formed in early 2004 when John Conley, Michael Yoas and Jim Rivas, who had played together previously in various other bands including Holiday Flyer, got together and started writing songs. The intention was to veer away from the poppier songs that they produced in their earlier bands and find a more indie rock-based center. Armed with the start of about 7 songs and a band name, they began looking for a bass player to round out the group. A chance meeting between Jim Rivas and a friend of Mike Carr's, initiated by a conversation about Jim's The Shins T-shirt, resulted in Mike Carr's introduction into the band.

The fully formed band continued practicing and writing songs and played their first live show on September 8, 2005. Over the next four years, they continued to refine their sound and recorded what would eventually become their first full-length album. Zero Point Zero was released on March 24, 2009 on Darla Records.

Desario's second full-length album, Mixer, was released on February 28, 2012 on upstart label Test Pattern Records. It was picked as one of the year's best 30 albums by The Big Takeover.

In May 2014, Jim Rivas left the band and was replaced by drummer Kirklyn Cox.

== Influences ==
Desario's sound has evolved into sometimes dark indie rock, but always with a pop and melodic core. As a standard four-piece band, their songs are highlighted by driving drums, melodic bass lines and both rhythm and picked guitar parts. Not always immediately obvious, the complex melodies are sometimes revealed after repeated listenings. Some of Desario's more recent influences include contemporary bands such as Interpol, The Walkmen, and Doves, as well as classic indie bands such as The Jesus and Mary Chain, Echo & the Bunnymen, The Stone Roses, and New Order. As if to acknowledge the band's sound's similarity to Scottish indie rock acts, SoundsXP wrote: "Desario call Sacramento, California home, but if you were told they hailed from the somewhat less exotic city of Glasgow you probably wouldn't bat an eyelid.”

== Discography ==
Albums

- Zero Point Zero (Darla Records, 2009)
- Mixer (Test Pattern Records, 2012)
- iii III (Test Pattern Records, 2017)
- Signal and Noise (Fort Lowell Records/Sunday Records], 2022)

EPs

- Red Returns (Test Pattern Records, 2016)
- Haunted (Pattern Records, 2016)

Compilations

- Little Darla Has a Treat for You v.27: Eternal Spring Edition (Darla Records, 2009)
- Singles Going Steady: A Darla Label Sampler, Spring 2010 (Darla Records, 2010)
