= Turning Point (American band) =

American hardcore punk band

- Origin: Moorestown, New Jersey
- Genres: Hardcore punk; emocore; melodic hardcore
- Years active: 1988–1991; 1994, 2016-present
- Labels: Jade Tree; New Age; Hi-Impact; Temperance
- Spinoffs: Godspeed, Shadow Season
- Spinoff of: Pointless
- Past members: Frank Candelori; Nick Greif; Ken Flavell; Jay Laughlin; Steve Crudello

Turning Point was an American straight edge hardcore punk band from New Jersey that existed from 1988 to 1991. Their early releases had the sound of youth crew, with lyrics relating to social issues or being straight edge. The later material was more emo-influenced, integrating more emotional lyrics, softer vocal delivery, and octave chords.

This eventually led the way for other straight edge/hardcore bands to do so, such as Split Lip and Falling Forward.

Lead singer Skip Candelori and guitarist Jay Laughlin previously formed Moorestown, New Jersey–based Pointless. Ken Flavell (drums) originally played drums with brother Chris Flavell in the early southern New Jersey hardcore band Failsafe. Nick Greif (bass) previously played bass in the late-1980s straight edge hardcore band Awareness.

Candelori died in 2002 of an accidental drug overdose.

In March 2016, it was announced that the band would perform at the This Is Hardcore festival in Philadelphia in August. Tim McMahon (Mouthpiece), Geoff Rickly (Thursday, United Nations) and Rob Fish (Release, Resurrection, 108) performed vocals for this appearance.

== Members ==
- Frank "Skip" Candelori – lead vocals (1988–1991, died 2002)
- Jay Laughlin – guitar (1988–1991, 2016)
- Nick Greif – bass (1988–1991, 2016)
- Ken Flavell – drums, percussion (1988–1991, 2016)
- Steve Crudello – guitar (1988–1989)

== Discography ==
Studio albums

- It's Always Darkest Before the Dawn CD/LP/CS (1990, New Age Records)

Extended plays

- Turning Point demo tape (1988, self-released)
- Turning Point 7-inch (1988, Hi-Impact Records)
- Turning Point/No Escape split 7-inch (1991, Temperance Records)

Compilation albums

- The Few and the Proud CD (1995, Lost and Found Records)
- Turning Point 1988-1991 CD/2LP (2000, Jade Tree Records)
- Behind This Wall: 1988–1991 12-inch (2021, Revelation Records)

Compilation appearances

- Rebuilding compilation 7-inch/CD (1990, Temperance Records) - "Broken"
- Forever 7-inch (1990, rate Records) - "Insecurity"
- Words to Live By, Words to Die For 7-inch (1990, New Age Records) – "My Turn to Win"

== Related bands (and shared members) ==
- 1200 – Jay Laughlin
- Christ
- Edgewise
- Godspeed – Frank "Skip" Candelori, Jay Laughlin
- Ignition
- Lenola – Jay Laughlin
- Like A Fox – Jay Laughlin
- Memorial Day – Frank "Skip" Candelori
- No Escape – Steve Crudello
- Search – Ken Flavell
- Seven Gone – Steve Crudello
- Shadow Season – Jay Laughlin, Ken Flavel
- Pointless – Frank "Skip" Candelori, Jay Laughlin
- Fail Safe
- Good Conduct
- Awareness
- Plastic Eaters – Steve Crudello
- One Ton Shovel – Steven Crudello
- Honey
