= Deer Apartments =

Studio album by Matt Pond PA
- Released: 1998
- Genre: Pop
- Label: File 13
- Producer: Josh Kramer

Matt Pond PA chronology
Deer Apartments (1998)	Measure (2000)

Deer Apartments is the first album by the American band Matt Pond PA, released in 1998. It won CDNow's Unheard? competition for unsigned artists that year. Soon after the release, Deer Apartments largely remained out of print until 2024, when it was released on vinyl for the first time, with a run of 520 being produced.

== Critical reception ==
The Philadelphia Inquirer deemed the album "a stunning singer-songwriter/chamber-rock debut." The Philadelphia Daily News considered it an "orchestrated and intellectual brand of pop." In 2004, The News Journal labeled it "a bouncy affair with pop guitars, electronic effects and Pond's just enough vocals that sometimes resembled Robert Smith."

== Track listing ==
1. "For Sale" – 3:56
2. "Fortune Flashlight" – 3:12
3. "Perfect Fit" – 3:58
4. "The Lettuce" – 4:37
5. "Stars and Scars" – 3:37
6. "Green Pennies" – 3:01
7. "Deer Season" – 2:13
8. "Electric" – 3:52
9. "Corn Stalks" – 3:26
10. "Riser Two" – 3:22
11. "Possibilities of Summer" – 2:44
12. "Hunter" – 2:32
13. "Bad Idea" – 3:26
14. "Full as Full" – 3:14
15. "Apology" – 3:15
