= Dieppe Park (Montreal) =

Urban park in Montreal, Canada

- Parc De Dieppe
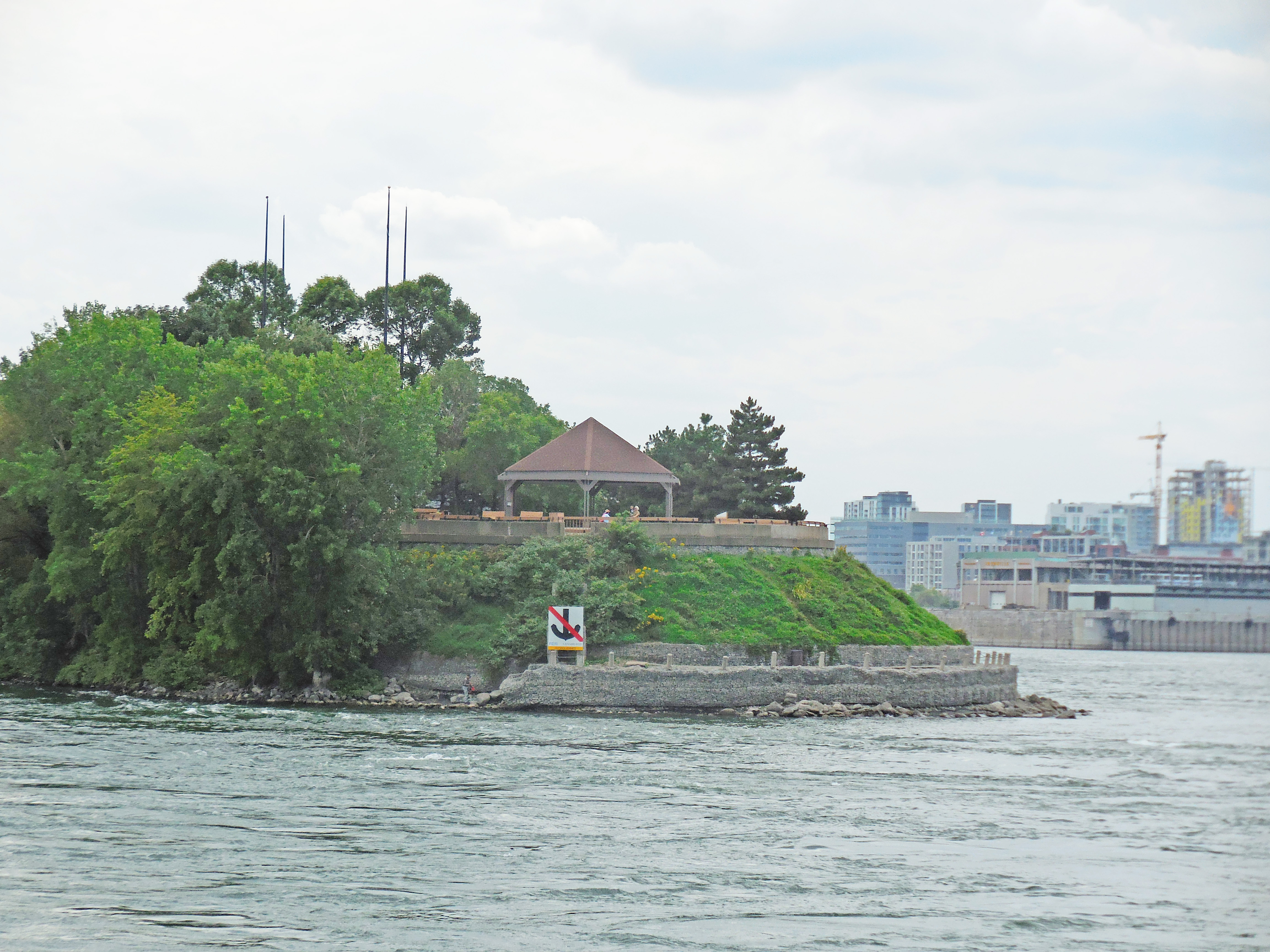
- Northeast point of the park
- Interactive map of Dieppe Park
- Type: Urban park
- Location: Cité du Havre, Montreal, Quebec, Canada
- Coordinates: 45°30′21″N 73°32′36″W
- Area: 7 hectares (17 acres)
- Operator: City of Montreal
- Open: 6:00 a.m. to 12:00 a.m.
- Status: Open all year
- Public transit: STM Bus: 777
- Website: Parc De Dieppe

Dieppe Park (French: Parc de Dieppe) is a park in Montreal, Quebec, Canada. It is at the eastern tip of Cité du Havre, in the borough of Ville-Marie. Between 1992 and 2017, it was known as Parc de la Cité-du-Havre. In 2017 it was named Dieppe Park to mark the 75th anniversary of the Dieppe Raid.

Despite it having an area of just 7 hectares, it is categorized by the city of Montreal as one of its large parks.

The park offers an excellent view of the Old Port of Montreal, Downtown Montreal, and the Jacques Cartier Bridge. It also is a viewing point of the Montreal Fireworks Festival.

Nearby is the original Habitat 67 housing complex, the renowned Montréal landmark built for Expo 67.
