= Emblems (album) =

Studio album by Matt Pond PA
- Released: May 4, 2004
- Genre: Indie rock
- Length: 49:51
- Label: Altitude

Matt Pond PA chronology
Four Songs EP (2004)	Emblems (2004)	Winter Songs (EP) (2005)

Emblems is the fifth album by Matt Pond PA, released in 2004.

Professional ratings
Aggregate scores
Source	Rating
Metacritic	70/100
Review scores
Source	Rating
AllMusic	4/5 stars

== Track listing ==
1. "KC" – 2:53
2. "Closest (Look Out)" – 4:48
3. "Lily Two" – 4:03
4. "Bring on the Ending" – 4:14
5. "The Butcher" – 4:15
6. "New Hampshire" – 4:50
7. "Claire" – 3:03
8. "Summer (Butcher Two)" – 4:27
9. "East Coast E." – 4:00
10. "Last Song" – 4:06
11. "Grave's Disease" – 4:23
12. "Close (KC Two)" – 4:49
