= Pareigis Hopf algebra =

In algebra, the Pareigis Hopf algebra is the Hopf algebra over a field k whose left comodules are essentially the same as complexes over k, in the sense that the corresponding monoidal categories are isomorphic. It was introduced by Pareigis (1981) as a natural example of a Hopf algebra that is neither commutative nor cocommutative.

== Construction ==
As an algebra over k, the Pareigis algebra is generated by elements x,y, 1/y, with the relations xy + yx = x^{2} = 0. The coproduct takes x to x⊗1 + (1/y)⊗x and y to y⊗y, and the counit takes x to 0 and y to 1. The antipode takes x to xy and y to its inverse and has order 4.

== Relation to complexes ==
If M = ⊕M_{n} is a complex with differential d of degree –1, then M can be made into a comodule over H by letting the coproduct take m to Σ y^{n}⊗m_{n} + y^{n+1}x⊗dm_{n}, where m_{n} is the component of m in M_{n}. This gives an equivalence between the monoidal category of complexes over k with the monoidal category of comodules over the Pareigis Hopf algebra.

== See also ==
- Sweedler's Hopf algebra is the quotient of the Pareigis Hopf algebra obtained by putting y^{2} = 1.
