= Moss Sweedler =

American mathematician

Moss Eisenberg Sweedler (born 29 April 1942, in Brooklyn) is an American mathematician, known for Sweedler's Hopf algebra, Sweedler's notation, measuring coalgebras, and his proof, with Harry Prince Allen, of a conjecture of Nathan Jacobson.

== Education and career ==
Sweedler received his Ph.D. from the Massachusetts Institute of Technology in 1965. His thesis, Commutative Hopf Algebras with Antipode, was written under the direction of thesis advisor Bertram Kostant. Sweedler wrote Hopf Algebras (1969), which became the standard reference book on Hopf algebras. He, with Harry P. Allen, used Hopf algebras to prove in 1969 a famous 25-year-old conjecture of Jacobson about the forms of generalized Witt algebras over algebraically closed fields of finite characteristic. From 1965 to the mid 1980s Sweeder worked on commutative algebra and related disciplines. Since the mid 1980s Sweedler has worked primarily on computer algebra. His research resulted in his position as director of the Army Center of Excellence for computer algebra.

Sweedler was an Invited Speaker at the International Congress of Mathematicians in 1974 in Vancouver. He was a Guggenheim Fellow for the academic year 1980–1981.

With his wife Kristin, he helped establish the Sweedler Nature Preserve.

== Selected publications ==
- Sweedler, Moss Eisenberg (1967). "Hopf algebras with one grouplike element". Trans. Amer. Math. Soc. 127 (3): 515–526. doi:10.1090/s0002-9947-1967-0210748-5. MR 0210748.
- Sweedler, Moss E. (1967). "Cocommutative Hopf algebras with antipode". Bull. Amer. Math. Soc. 73 (1): 126–128. doi:10.1090/s0002-9904-1967-11677-x. hdl:1721.1/72926. MR 0214646.
- Sweedler, Moss Eisenberg (1968). "Cohomology of algebras over Hopf algebras". Trans. Amer. Math. Soc. 133: 205–239. doi:10.1090/s0002-9947-1968-0224684-2. MR 0224684.
- Sweedler, Moss E. (1969), Hopf algebras, Mathematics Lecture Note Series, W. A. Benjamin, Inc., New York, ISBN 9780805392548, MR 0252485
- with H. P. Allen: Allen, Harry Prince; Sweedler, Moss Eisenberg (1969). "A theory of linear descent based upon Hopf algebraic techniques". J. Algebra. 12 (2): 242–294. doi:10.1016/0021-8693(69)90051-9. MR 0242906.
- with Richard G. Larson: Larson, Richard Gustavus; Sweedler, Moss Eisenberg (1969). "An associative orthogonal bilinear form for Hopf algebras". Amer. J. Math. 91 (1): 75–94. doi:10.2307/2373270. JSTOR 2373270.
- Sweedler, Moss E. (1971). "Weakening a theorem on divided powers". Trans. Amer. Math. Soc. 154: 427–428. doi:10.1090/s0002-9947-1971-0279162-1. MR 0279162.
- Groups of simple algebras, Institut des Hautes Etudes Scientifiques 44 (1975), 79–189.
- Sweedler, Moss (1975). "The predual theorem to the Jacobson-Bourbaki theorem". Trans. Amer. Math. Soc. 213: 391–406. doi:10.1090/s0002-9947-1975-0387345-9. MR 0387345.
- Sweedler, Moss Eisenberg (1975). "When is the tensor product of algebras local?". Proc. Amer. Math. Soc. 48: 8–10. doi:10.1090/s0002-9939-1975-0360568-6. MR 0360568.
- with Kenneth Newman: Newman, Kenneth; Sweedler, Moss E. (1979). "A realization of the additive Witt group". Proc. Amer. Math. Soc. 76 (1): 39–42. doi:10.1090/s0002-9939-1979-0534386-3. MR 0534386.
- with Darrell E. Halle and R. Larson: Haile, Darrell E.; Larson, Richard G.; Sweedler, Moss E. (1983). "A new invariant for C over R: almost invertible cohomology theory and the classification of idempotent cohomology classes and algebras by partially ordered sets with a Galois group action". Amer. J. Math. 105 (3): 689–814. doi:10.2307/2374320. JSTOR 2374320.
- with I. Rubio and C. Heegard: Gröbner bases for linear recursion relations on m-D arrays and applications to decoding, Proc. IEEE Int'l Symp. on Information Theory, June 29–July 4, 1997, Ulm, Germany.
- with K. Shirayanagi: Remarks on automatic algorithm stabilization, invited contribution to (fourth) IMACS Conf. on Appl. of Computer Algebra (1998).
- with L. Robbiano: Robbiano, Lorenzo; Sweedler, Moss (1998). "Ideal and subalgebra coefficients". Proc. Amer. Math. Soc. 126 (8): 2213–2219. doi:10.1090/s0002-9939-98-04306-8. MR 1443407.
- with Edward Mosteig: Mosteig, Edward; Sweedler, Moss (2004). "The growth of valuations on rational function fields in two variables". Proc. Amer. Math. Soc. 132 (12): 3473–3483. doi:10.1090/s0002-9939-04-07456-8. MR 2084067.
