= The Dark Leaves =

Studio album by Matt Pond PA
- Released: April 13, 2010
- Genre: Indie rock
- Length: 39:28
- Label: Altitude

Matt Pond PA chronology
The Threeep (2009)	The Dark Leaves (2010)	Spring Fools (2011)

Professional ratings
Aggregate scores
Source	Rating
Metacritic	56/100
Review scores
Source	Rating
AllMusic	2.5/5 stars
Pitchfork	4.8/10.0
Spin	6/10

The Dark Leaves is the eighth studio album by Matt Pond PA, released on April 13, 2010. The album was produced in a cabin in Bearsville, NY by Matt Pond and Chris Hansen.

== Track listing ==
1. "Starting" – 3:50
2. "Running Wild" – 4:21
3. "Specks" – 3:49
4. "Remains" – 5:35
5. "Sparrows" – 2:50
6. "Brooklyn Fawn" – 3:56
7. "Ruins" – 3:47
8. "Winter Fawn" – 5:15
9. "The Dark Leaves Theme" – 3:29
10. "First Song" – 2:36
