= Last Light (album) =

Studio album by Matt Pond PA
- Released: September 25, 2007
- Genre: Indie rock
- Label: Altitude

Matt Pond PA chronology
If You Want Blood (2007)	Last Light (2007)	The Freeep (2008)

Professional ratings
Aggregate scores
Source	Rating
Metacritic	64/100
Review scores
Source	Rating
AllMusic	4/5 stars
Pitchfork	(3.7/10.0)

Last Light is the seventh album by Matt Pond PA, released in 2007.

== Track listing ==
1. "Last Light" – 4:16
2. "People Have a Way" – 3:26
3. "Locate the Pieces" – 3:54
4. "Wild Girl" – 1:19
5. "Honestly" – 4:05
6. "Taught to Look Away" – 2:49
7. "Sunlight" – 3:54
8. "Basement Parties" – 3:03
9. "Until the East Coast Ends" – 1:35
10. "Foreign Bedrooms" – 3:49
11. "The Crush" – 4:25
12. "Giving it All Away" – 3:37
13. "It's Not So Bad At All" – 5:07
