= Seen / Unseen =

2022 compilation album by Sweet Trip

Compilation album by Sweet Trip
- Released: March 18, 2022
- Length: 204:00 (Digital); 86:38 (LP)
- Label: Darla Records
- Producer: Roberto Burgos

Sweet Trip chronology
A Tiny House, In Secret Speeches, Polar Equals (2021)	Seen / Unseen (2022)

Seen / Unseen is a 2022 compilation by American experimental pop act Sweet Trip, released on March 18, 2022, by Darla Records.

== Background ==
In 2021, Sweet Trip released their first studio album in 12 years, A Tiny House, In Secret Speeches, Polar Equals, after officially reforming in 2019 to release new music due to fan demand. However, just a year later, on January 29, 2022, Valerie Cooper announced she was leaving Sweet Trip for personal reasons, reducing the act to just Roby Burgos. Despite this, Darla Records continued to put out re-releases of their old material, with a re-release of their 1999 EP Alura announced that February.

On March 17, Darla Records put out an announcement on their Instagram that they were releasing the 50-track compilation Seen / Unseen at midnight, with a vinyl pre-order available as well. The compilation was being put together prior to the band's breakup, with Roby providing a collection of 57 tracks, and Valerie and Darla independently culling the tracks down. It is based on a popular YouTube bootleg consisting mostly of tracks released on SoundCloud by Roby, with the official release containing all those songs alongside a large selection of demos and shelved tracks by the band.

== Track listing ==
=== Digital Version ===
Track list adapted from digital release.

Disc 1

No.	Title	Length
1.	"KKMJ"	3:34
2.	"Aluralura"	3:40
3.	"Darlin'"	4:52
4.	"Deep"	4:15
5.	"Mar"	2:40
6.	"A Seagull Lull (Demo Version)"	3:17
7.	"Route of Escape"	3:05
8.	"Soul to Harvest"	3:34
9.	"Steps"	3:16
10.	"Things to Ponder While Falling (Demo Version)"	4:03
11.	"To Live on Valium"	5:32
12.	"Tonight (Demo Version)"	4:41
13.	"Total"	3:38
14.	"Untitled"	4:53
15.	"Wait, Stay"	5:11
16.	"W01"	2:22
17.	"You Play Your Guitar and Sing"	2:10
18.	"No Title Half"	7:20
19.	"Milk (Illegal Apartment Live)"	4:26
Total length:		76:38

Disc 2

No.	Title	Length
1.	"203"	4:22
2.	"A Seagull Lull (Reworked Demo Version)"	6:16
3.	"And the Sea Will Rise"	3:45
4.	"As We Forget"	3:25
5.	"BO-04"	4:00
6.	"BO-05"	5:53
7.	"Burmality"	3:54
8.	"Foencahl (AKAI S6000 Mix)"	9:19
9.	"Glorious Pain, Don't Steal My Heart"	6:01
10.	"I Want My Cone"	2:25
11.	"In This Prison, The Heart is a Well"	6:07
12.	"Magic Science"	1:23
13.	"Metal Test"	1:19
Total length:		58:14

Disc 3

No.	Title	Length
1.	"Monica Bellucci"	3:38
2.	"Piano"	4:46
3.	"PNC"	1:12
4.	"Rain Song"	4:27
5.	"Simple Life"	2:29
6.	"Singularity"	6:04
7.	"Supur"	3:58
8.	"The One That Sounds Like Starry"	10:24
9.	"Curved"	1:14
10.	"Unconscious Living"	6:02
11.	"V4l226"	2:28
12.	"ValJuno"	5:06
13.	"Working"	2:16
14.	"Wandering Splendor"	4:26
15.	"Wolf Ambush (Acoustic Demo Version)"	0:55
16.	"Wolf Ambush (Orchestral Demo Version)"	3:21
17.	"Wolf Theme"	3:15
18.	"XEST"	2:58
Total length:		69:07

=== LP Version ===
Track list adapted from Darla Records.

Side A

No.	Title	Length
1.	"KKMJ"	3:40
2.	"Aluralura"	3:38
3.	"Darlin'"	4:52
4.	"Deep"	4:09
5.	"Mar"	2:38
Total length:		18:57

Side B

No.	Title	Length
1.	"A Seagull Lull (Original Demo)"	3:18
2.	"Route of Escape"	3:08
3.	"Soul to Harvest"	3:36
4.	"Steps"	3:15
5.	"Things to Ponder While Falling (Original Demo)"	4:04
6.	"You Play Your Guitar and Sing"	2:09
Total length:		19:30

Side C

No.	Title	Length
1.	"To Live on Valium"	5:30
2.	"Tonight (Demo)"	4:40
3.	"Total"	3:49
4.	"Untitled"	4:52
Total length:		18:51

Side D

No.	Title	Length
1.	"Wait, Stay"	5:10
2.	"W01"	2:17
3.	"No Title Half"	7:17
4.	"Milk (Illegal Apartment Live)"	4:00
Total length:		18:44
