= Spring Fools =

EP by Matt Pond PA
- Released: April 26, 2011
- Genre: Indie rock
- Length: 20:40
- Label: Altitude
- Producer: Brian McTear and Matt Pond

Matt Pond PA chronology
The Dark Leaves (2010)	Spring Fools (2011)	Lebanon PA (Original Soundtrack) (2011)

Professional ratings
Review scores
Source	Rating
Alternative Press	link

Spring Fools is the follow-up to Matt Pond PA's eighth studio album The Dark Leaves. It was released on April 26, 2011.

== Track listing ==
1. "Love to Get Used" – 3:34
2. "Human Beings" – 4:03
3. "Lovers Always Win" – 3:11
4. "Spring Fawn" – 5:20
5. "Sugar Bush" – 4:32
