= Halica: Bliss Out v.11 =

1998 debut studio album by Sweet Trip

Studio album by Sweet Trip
- Released: November 10, 1998
- Genre: Electronica; post-rock; ambient pop; ambient techno; shoegaze
- Length: 55:08
- Label: Darla Records
- Producer: Roberto Burgos

Sweet Trip chronology
Fish Remixes & Versions (1998)	Halica: Bliss Out v.11 (1998)	Alura (EP) (1999)

Halica: Bliss Out v.11, often referred to as just Halica, is the debut studio album from the American group Sweet Trip, and was released by Darla Records in November 1998. It was the eleventh entry in the label's Bliss Out series of ambient-style records.

== Background ==
Initially, in Sweet Trip's early years as a three piece, the band began as a "traditional guitar, bass, and drums" group, albeit struggling to find a bass player for the songs they were writing. During this period, they created many 4-track recordings, with the songs containing many elements of indie music, pop, rock, electronica and ambient music. Five of these tracks were printed onto cassette tapes and sent to several indie labels, one of which was Darla Records. According to Valerie Cooper, they were one of the first labels to show genuine interest in their work, and so the band signed on with them; songs from the cassette would eventually be part of their debut's track list.

The cover artwork features a silvery cloud-like background, which according to the release for the expanded edition is an edited photo of ecstasy pills given to the band's designer by at-the-time member Viet Le. Also on the cover is a depiction of a mushroom after the album's title, which according to Burgos is an in-joke based on a "pretty wild mop-top" hairstyle he had at the time that Le would make fun of.

== Track listing ==
Professional ratings
Review scores
Source	Rating
AllMusic	link

Track list adapted from CD version.

No.	Title	Length
1.	"Fish"	11:14
2.	"Pulse"	10:05
3.	"Follow Me^{[a]}"	6:43
4.	"Come to Me^{[a]}"	7:12
5.	"Starlife"	3:47
6.	"Traces"	7:35
7.	"Jelly Charm"	8:35
Total length:		55:11

=== Notes ===
1. The names of these two tracks are switched, which was rectified for later digital releases.

== Halica: Bliss Out, v.11 (Expanded Edition) ==
Halica: Bliss Out, v.11 (Expanded Edition)

Compilation album by Sweet Trip
- Released: February 11, 2022
- Length: 1:33:27
- Label: Darla Records
- Producer: Roberto Burgos

Sweet Trip chronology
A Tiny House, In Secret Speeches, Polar Equals (2021)	Halica: Bliss Out, v.11 (Expanded Edition) (2022)	Seen / Unseen (2022)

In January 2022, a re-release of the album was announced, with a reorganised and expanded track list. This version of the album combines the original release with tracks from the 1998 EP Fish Remixes & Versions, alongside two additional tracks only featured on Little Darla compilations.

=== Digital track listing ===
Track list adapted from Darla Records.

No.	Title	Length
1.	"Fish"	11:14
2.	"Come to Me"	6:43
3.	"Pulse"	10:05
4.	"Follow Me"	7:12
5.	"Starlife"	3:47
6.	"Traces"	7:35
7.	"Jelly Charm"	8:35
8.	"Fish (Velora Mix 2022)"	5:33
9.	"Reflect"	3:39
10.	"Fish (Minty Cut 2022)"	3:46
11.	"Reflect 2"	3:20
12.	"Fish (Junior Varsity KM Evolution Mix)"	8:05
13.	"Fish (Little Darla Mix)"	9:20
14.	"Reflections"	4:35
Total length:		1:33:27
