= Habitat 67 =

Housing complex in Montreal, Quebec

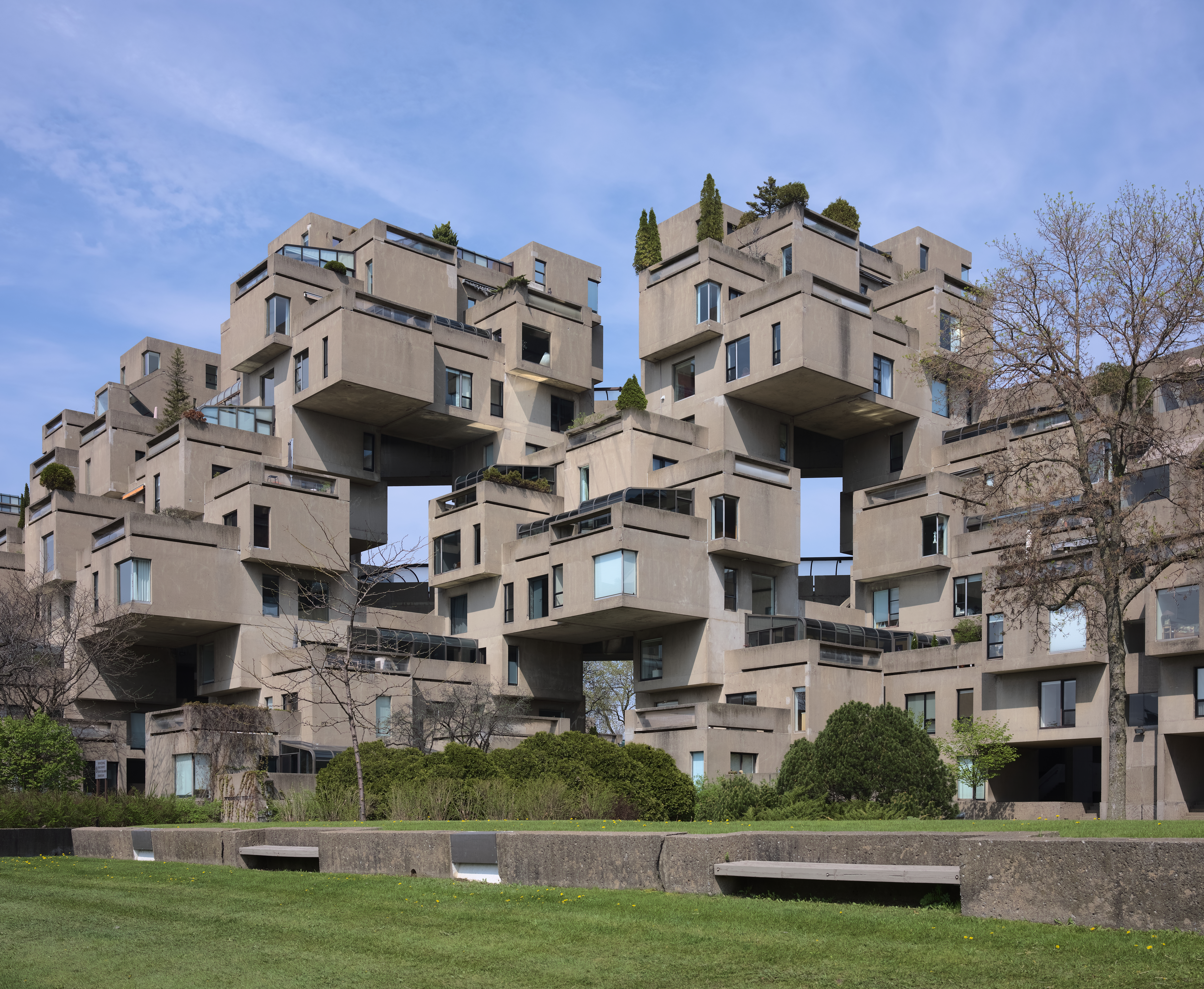
- Habitat 67 viewed from street level in 2019

General information
- Type: Residential complex
- Architectural style: Brutalist, Metabolist
- Location: Cité du Havre, Montreal, Quebec, 2600 Avenue Pierre‑Dupuy, QC H3C 3R4, Canada
- Coordinates: 45°30′00″N 73°32′38″W
- Groundbreaking: 1964
- Construction started: 1964; 62 years ago
- Completed: 1967; 59 years ago
- Cost: CA$12.4 million (1967)
- Owner: Tenants’ limited partnership (since 1985)

Technical details
- Structural system: Prefabricated reinforced‑concrete modules
- Floor count: 12
- Floor area: 29,700 square metres (320,000 sq ft)
- Lifts/elevators: 3

Design and construction
- Architect: Moshe Safdie
- Architecture firm: Safdie Architects
- Developer: Canadian Corporation for the 1967 World Exposition
- Structural engineer: August Komendant
- Designations: Montreal heritage monument (2009)

Other information
- Number of rooms: 146 residences

Habitat 67, or just Habitat, is a housing complex at Cité du Havre, on the Saint Lawrence River, Montreal, Quebec, Canada, designed by Israeli-Canadian-American architect Moshe Safdie. It originated in his master's thesis at the School of Architecture at McGill University and then an amended version was built for Expo 67, a World's Fair held from April to October 1967. Its address is 2600 Avenue Pierre-Dupuy, next to the Marc-Drouin Quay. Habitat 67 is considered an architectural landmark and a recognized building in Montreal.

== History ==
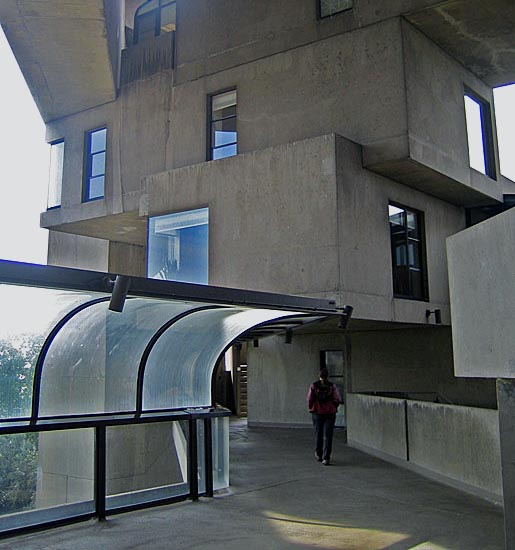
Inside the complex: a semi-covered walkway connecting two sections of units

Safdie's design for Habitat 67 began as a thesis project for his architecture program at McGill University. It was "highly recognized" at the institution, though Safdie cites its failure to win the Pilkington Prize, an award for the best thesis at Canadian schools of architecture, as early evidence of its controversial nature. After leaving to work with Louis Kahn in Philadelphia, Safdie was approached by Sandy van Ginkel, his former thesis advisor, to develop the master plan for Expo 67, the world's fair that was set to take place in Montreal during 1967. Safdie decided to propose his thesis as one of the pavilions and began developing his plan. After the plans were approved in Ottawa by Mitchell Sharp, the federal cabinet minister responsible for the exhibition, and Prime Minister Lester B. Pearson, Safdie was given the blessing of the Expo 67 Director of Installations, Edward Churchill, to leave the planning committee in order to work on the building project as an independent architect. The construction was done by Anglin-Norcross Ltd. of Montreal. Safdie was awarded the project in spite of his relative youth and inexperience, an opportunity he later described as "a fairy tale, an amazing fairy tale."

The original plans called for 1,200 homes at a cost of $45 million. However, Safdie could only secure funding for a much reduced construction. This smaller development (about CA$22.4 million) was financed by the federal government, but is now owned by its tenants, who formed a limited partnership that purchased the building from the Canada Mortgage and Housing Corporation in 1985.

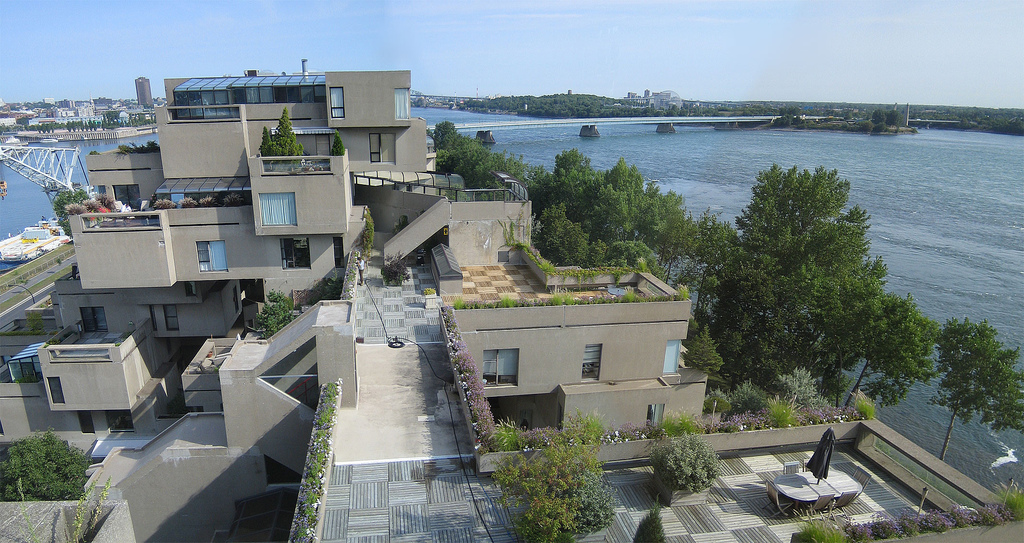
Habitat 67's interlocking forms, connected walkways and landscaped terraces were key in achieving Safdie's goal of a private and natural environment within the limits of a dense urban space.

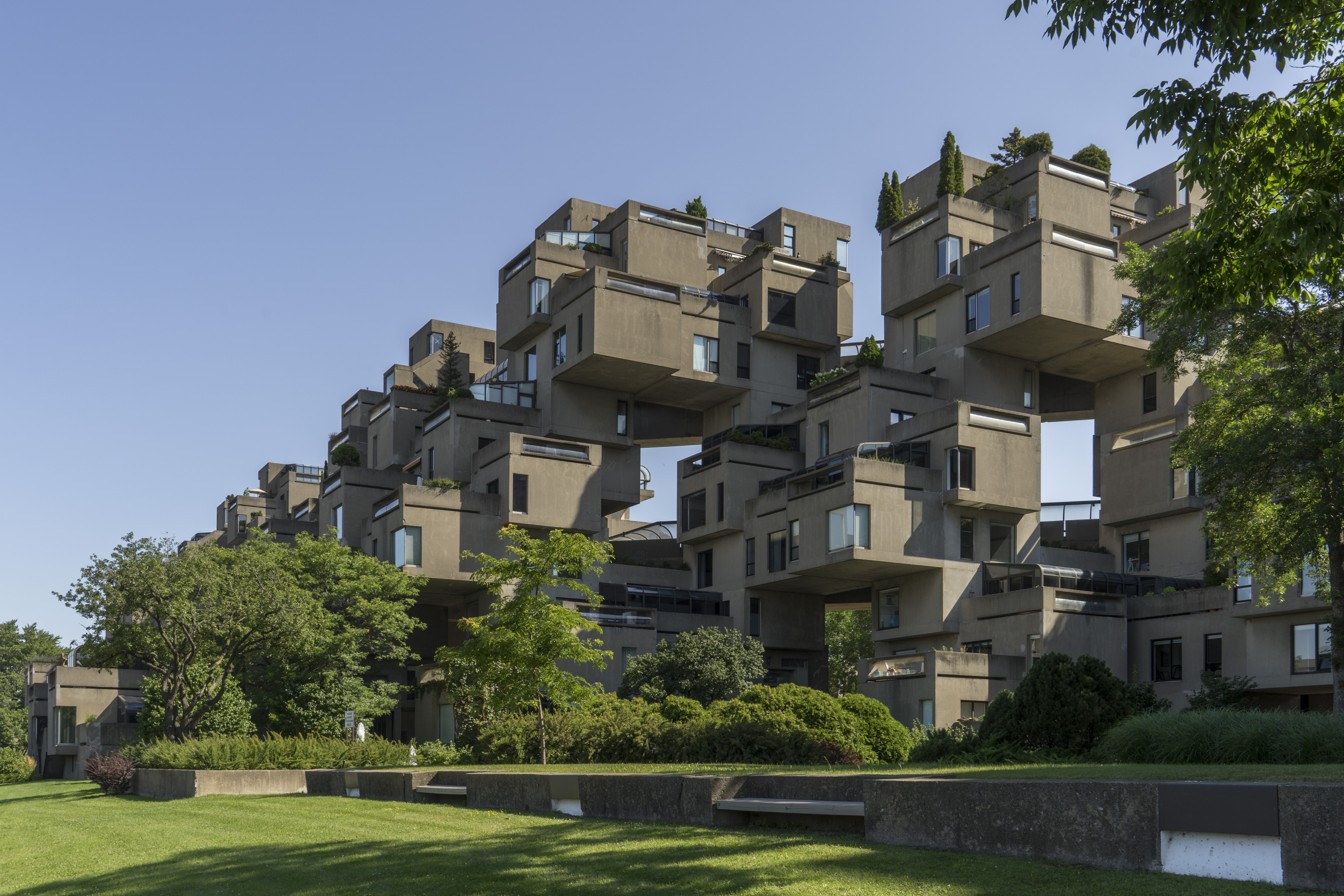
Habitat 67, southwest view

== Concept and design ==
Habitat 67 comprises 354 identical, prefabricated concrete forms (11.7 m × 5.3 m × 3 m [38 ft 5 in × 17 ft 5 in × 9 ft 10 in]) arranged in various combinations, divided into three pyramids, reaching up to 12 residential storeys, with a parking level, and a building services level. Together these units created 146 residences of varying sizes and configurations, each formed from one to eight linked concrete units. The complex originally contained 158 apartments, reduced from the original vision of 1,200, but several apartments have since been joined to create larger units, reducing the total number. Each unit is connected to at least one private landscaped garden terrace, built on the roof of the level below, which can range from approximately 20 to 90 square metres (225 to 1,000 sq ft) in size. The apartments each had a moulded plastic bathroom and a modular kitchen.

The development was designed to integrate the benefits of suburban homes—namely gardens, fresh air, privacy, and multilevelled environments—with the economics and density of a modern urban apartment building. It was believed to illustrate the new lifestyle people would live in increasingly crowded cities around the world. Safdie's goal for the project to be affordable housing largely failed: demand for the building's units has made them more expensive than originally envisioned. In addition, the existing structure was originally meant to be only the first phase of a much larger complex, but the high per-unit cost of approximately $140,000 ($22,120,000 for all 158) prevented that possibility.

The structural engineer for the project was August Eduard Komendant, an Estonian-American structural engineer and a pioneer in the field of prestressed concrete.

The theme of Expo 67 was "Man and His World", taken from Antoine de Saint-Exupéry's memoir Terre des hommes (literally, 'world of man', though it was published under the title Wind, Sand and Stars). Housing was also one of the main themes of Expo 67. Habitat 67 then became a thematic pavilion visited by thousands of visitors who came from around the world, and during the expo also served as the temporary residence of the many dignitaries visiting Montreal.

In March 2012, Habitat 67 won an online Lego Architecture poll and is a candidate to be added to the list of famous buildings that inspire a special replica Lego set. Lego bricks were actually used in the initial planning for Habitat; according to Safdie's firm, "initial models of the project were built using Lego bricks and subsequent iterations were also built with Lego bricks".

=== Access ===
Residents have private shuttle access to downtown Montreal, but access by foot is difficult. Guided tours are offered to the public.

In 2023, the extension of the 777 Casino bus route of the Société de transport de Montréal began serving Habitat 67, providing the complex with public transport access for the first time.

== Legacy and influence ==
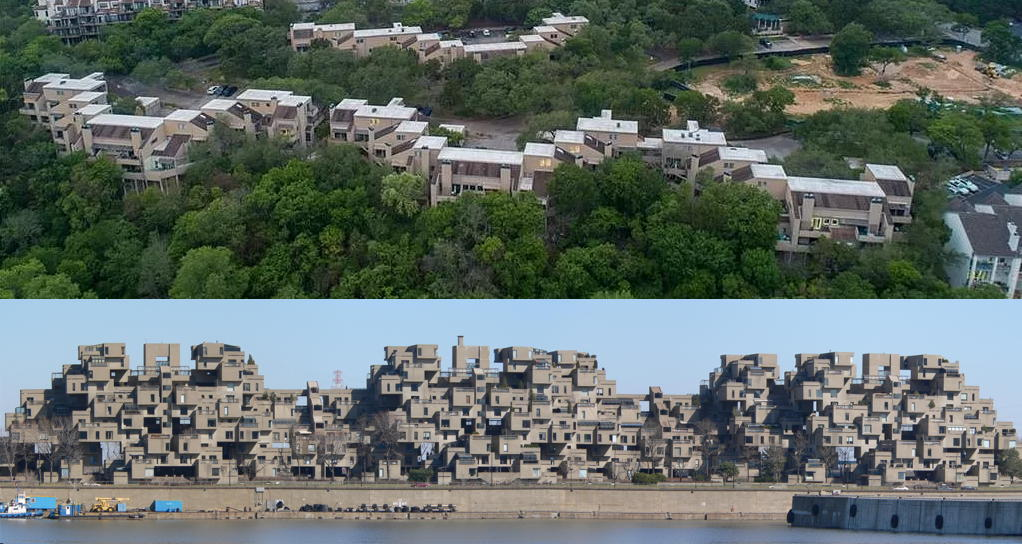
The 1981 Habidad project in Austin (upper image) drew inspiration from Habitat 67.

In 2017, Canada Post issued a commemorative stamp for the 50th anniversary of Expo 67 featuring the structure.

In 2017, from June 1 through August 13, Habitat '67 vers l'avenir / The Shape of Things to Come, an exhibition at Centre de Design, Université du Québec à Montréal, presented "archival images and objects from the project's origins with conceptual drawings, and models, bringing them together with plans for unbuilt iterations".

As a symbol of Expo 67, which was attended by over 50 million people during the six months it was open, Habitat 67 gained worldwide acclaim as a "fantastic experiment" and "architectural wonder". This experiment was and is regarded as both a success and failure—it "redefined urban living" and has since become "a very successful co-op", but at the same time ultimately failed to revolutionize affordable housing or launch a wave of prefabricated, modular development as Safdie had envisioned. Despite its problems, however, Habitat's fame and success "made [Safdie's] reputation" and helped launch his career; Safdie has now designed over 75 buildings and master plans around the world. Decades after Habitat, much of Safdie's work still holds to the concepts that were so fundamental to its design, especially the themes of reimagining high-density housing and improving social integration through architecture that have become "synonymous" with his work. However, The Guardian quoted The Walrus assessment of it as a "failed dream". Alas, Christopher Alexander suggests "Unfortunately, it does not have the deep structure of a true living structure. Instead its repetition...was actually still banal and deadening in spite of the serious effort made".

In 2023, Safdie Architects, in collaboration with Epic Games, modeled the entirety of the original (much larger) vision in Unreal Engine.

The Habidad condominium project designed by the firm of Oteri Tisdale Dorey and built in 1981 in Austin, Texas, drew inspiration from Habitat 67.

== In popular culture ==
The music videos for Leonard Cohen's song "In My Secret Life" and for Marie-Chantal Toupin's song "Maudit bordel" were filmed at Habitat 67, as were scenes of the 1977 film The Disappearance.

It appears on the covers of the 2003 album Velocity : Design : Comfort by American electronic/experimental rock act Sweet Trip and the 2012 album The North by Canadian indie pop band Stars. It also appears on the album cover of Landslide's Drum & Bossa / Buddah, his debut single from 1999 that was released on Hospital Records.

Despite being set in a futuristic version of Japan, a rendition of Habitat 67 serves as setting for the climactic scene in Season 2, Episode 13 of the sci-fi anime, Ghost in the Shell: Stand Alone Complex, broadcast in 2005.

== Panorama ==
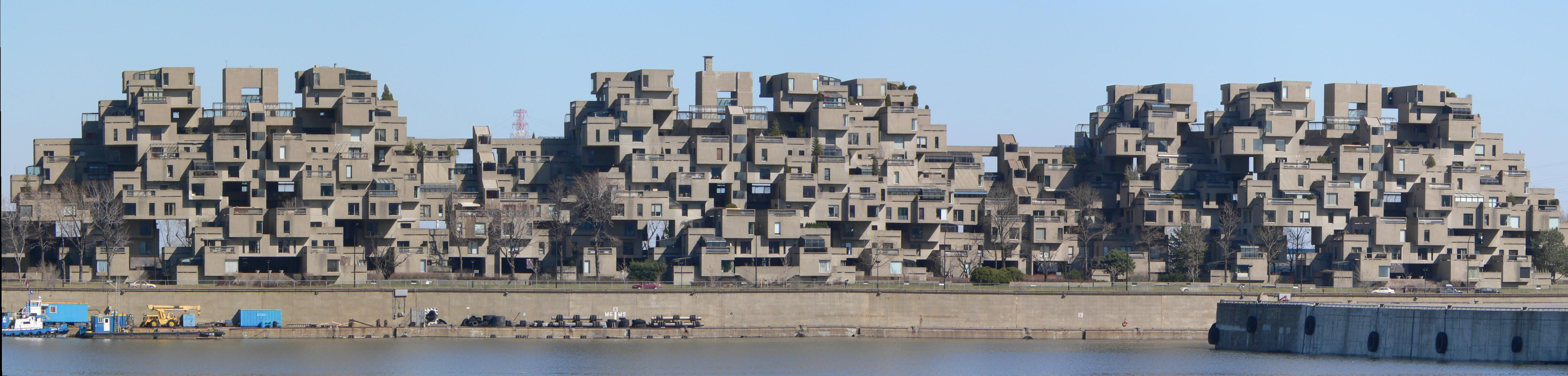
Habitat 67 as seen from Montreal's port

== See also ==
- Architecture of Canada
- Brutalism
- Dyson Institute Village
- Metabolism (architecture)
- Structuralism (architecture)
- List of Brutalist structures
