= Sweedler's Hopf algebra =

Example of a non-commutative and non-cocommutative Hopf algebra

In mathematics, Moss E. Sweedler (1969, p. 89–90) introduced an example of an infinite-dimensional Hopf algebra, and Sweedler's Hopf algebra H_{4} is a certain 4-dimensional quotient of it that is neither commutative nor cocommutative.

== Definition ==
The following infinite dimensional Hopf algebra was introduced by Sweedler (1969, pages 89–90). The Hopf algebra is generated as an algebra by three elements x, g and g^{−1}.

The coproduct Δ is given by

Δ(g) = g ⊗g, Δ(x) = 1⊗x + x ⊗g

The antipode S is given by

S(x) = –x g^{−1}, S(g) = g^{−1}

The counit ε is given by

ε(x)=0, ε(g) = 1

Sweedler's 4-dimensional Hopf algebra H_{4} is the quotient of this by the relations

x^{2} = 0, g^{2} = 1, gx = –xg

so it has a basis 1, x, g, xg (Montgomery 1993, p.8). Note that Montgomery describes a slight variant of this Hopf algebra using the opposite coproduct, i.e. the coproduct described above composed with the tensor flip on H_{4}⊗H_{4}. This Hopf algebra is isomorphic to the Hopf algebra described here by the Hopf algebra homomorphism $g\mapsto g$ and $x\mapsto gx$.

Sweedler's 4-dimensional Hopf algebra is a quotient of the Pareigis Hopf algebra, which is in turn a quotient of the infinite dimensional Hopf algebra.
