= The Threeep =

EP by Matt Pond PA
- Released: 2009 - 2013
- Genre: Indie
- Label: Altitude Records

Matt Pond PA chronology
The Freeep (2008)	The Threeep (2009)	The Dark Leaves (2010)

"The Threeep - Part I - Starting" First Installment Released November 6, 2009

"The Threeep - Part II - Remains" Second Installment Released May 11, 2010

"The Threeep - Part III - Ruins" Third Installment Released September 18, 2013

The Threeep is a three-part EP (hence the title) consisting of three singles from the album The Dark Leaves, by Matt Pond PA. Each single consists of three songs; a single from the album and two b-sides, one instrumental and one not. Several of Matt Pond's core bandmembers contributed to these sessions, including Chris Hansen (engineering, co-producing, guitar), Eve Miller (cello), Christian Frederickson (viola) and Dan Crowell (drums). Initially announced in 2009, each single was meant to be released on limited edition vinyl by Altitude Records, the design allowing for the three sleeves to clip together to form a cube, but to date only the first installment was ever pressed with an unspecified number on black vinyl, and 250 on colored vinyl. The first installment was also released on iTunes, but is no longer available, the second installment was digitally released on iTunes and Amazon MP3, and on September 18, 2013, the entire EP was eventually released as a free digital download via NoiseTrade and announced on Filter Magazine's website.

== Release history ==
First Installment - November 6, 2009
The Threeep - Part I - Starting

Second Installment - May 11, 2010
The Threeep - Part II - Remains

Third Installment - September 18, 2013
The Threeep - Part III - Ruins

== Track listing ==
1. "Starting" – 3:23
2. "The Colour Out Of Space" – 3:07
3. "Stopping" – 3:14
4. "Remains" – 5:35
5. "Some Debris" – 2:14
6. "Calls from Canada" – 3:11
7. "Ruins" – 3:47
8. "The Wrong Man" – 2:09
9. "Remember Me" – 2:55
