= Several Arrows Later =

Studio album by Matt Pond PA
- Released: October 11, 2005
- Genre: Indie rock
- Label: Altitude

Matt Pond PA chronology
Winter Songs (EP) (2005)	Several Arrows Later (2005)	If You Want Blood (2007)

Professional ratings
Aggregate scores
Source	Rating
Metacritic	72/100 link
Review scores
Source	Rating
AllMusic	link
Pitchfork	link

Several Arrows Later is the sixth album from Matt Pond PA, released in 2005.

== Track listing ==
1. "Halloween" – 5:02
2. "So Much Trouble" – 3:58
3. "The Trees and the Wild" – 2:48
4. "Several Arrows Later" – 3:34
5. "It Is Safe" – 4:58
6. "Emblems" – 3:12
7. "City Song" – 4:12
8. "From Debris" – 4:31
9. "Brooklyn Stars" – 3:49
10. "The Moviegoer" – 3:12
11. "Spring Provides" – 3:21
12. "Devil in the Water" – 5:27
