= Saloon (band) =

English indie musical group

- Origin: Reading, England
- Genre: Indie
- Years active: 1997–2004
- Label: Darla Records
- Past members: Matt Ashton; Alison Cotton; Adam Cresswell; Amanda Gomez; Mike Smoughton

Saloon was an English indie musical group from Reading, who formed in 1997 and disbanded in 2004. The band included Adam Cresswell (bass/synthesisers), Michael Smoughton (drums), added Alison Cotton (viola), Amanda Gomez (lead vocal) and Matt Ashton (guitars). Their first gig at The Fox and Hounds in Caversham. In 1999, Saloon came to the attention of DJ John Peel, who featured the band on his radio programme. The band recorded three Peel sessions, which aired 4 July 2001, 7 August 2002 and 19 April 2003.

== Career ==
The band released songs through various independent labels including "Shopping" (Amberley Records), "Electron" (Bearos Records), "Snow" (Fortuna Pop), and "Impact" (Glamour Puss), a split with the Sonic Catering Band. The band eventually settled on Darla Records for the US releases and the Track and Field Organisation in the UK, on which they were to release their last singles "Free Fall", "Have You Seen The Light" (a split with Dressy Bessy) and "Girls Are The New Boys".

At the same time as gigging and releasing numerous 7-inch singles, the band wrote and recorded their debut album, a process which took them a year and half. "(This Is) What We Call Progress"', which was engineered by singer Amanda Gomez at the Reading College School of Art and Design (now knows as Reading College)and mixed by Andrew Prinz of Mahogany in his New York studio, who also designed the sleeve. The album was released in April 2002 to mixed but mostly favourable reviews including the Sunday Times in the UK and Pitchfork which rated the album 7.4.

Saloon quickly got to work writing the follow-up. Between the release of the albums the band were hit with unexpected success when Girls Are The New Boys reached number one in Peel's annual Festive 50. This was one of four Saloon releases in the coveted chart, with two entries in 2001 and two entries in 2002. Following this success, Saloon came up against its first serious criticism with accusations of vote rigging. One fanzine Unpeeled went as far as printing an alternative Festive 48 which excluded both of the band's 2002 entries. Although the fact that the band were invited back for a third Peel Session suggested that Peel and his production team felt there had been nothing irregular, the criticism clearly disturbed feeling within the band. In a 2006 interview Cresswell, while commenting on their 2001 festive 50 number 12, commented "despite only being released on a 500 copy limited split 7-inch ... this song [Impact] reached Number 12 in John Peel's Festive 50. No one accused us of cheating that year though. Bitter, me?”

The self-produced second album If We Meet in the Future was released in June 2003, again to mostly positive reviews including the NME who awarded it 8/10 and Pitchfork who rated the album at 7/10

== Split and following years ==
Following the release, the band completed their touring commitments and disappeared. In May 2004 it was announced that Smoughton, Ashton and Cotton had quit, and on 30 October 2004, five days after the death of John Peel, Gomez and Cresswell announced the official split of the band.

A compilation album of the early Saloon singles, Lo-Fi Sounds, Hi-Fi Heart, was released in 2006. Gomez and Cresswell also provided production duties on the 2004 album Let's Get Static by another Track and Field band, The Projects. Gomez briefly also covered keyboard duties in the band.

In November 2010 Mike Smoughton and his wife Sara were killed in a car accident in Canada.
