= The Freeep =

EP by Matt Pond PA
- Released: 2008
- Genre: Indie
- Label: Altitude Records

Matt Pond PA chronology
People Have A Way (Single) (2007)	The Freeep (2008)	The Threeep (2009)

The Freeep is an EP from musical Indie group Matt Pond PA. Originally released for free, the EP was available as a direct download from the band's website. It has since been removed, but on September 1, 2009, it was released for sale as a digital download, via iTunes and Amazon MP3, with the new title Auri Sacra Fames.

== Track listing ==
1. "Hearts and Minds" – 2:38
2. "Our Braided Lives" – 4:16
3. "Five" – 1:51
4. "One and Only" – 4:26
5. "Imperfect" – 3:55
6. "Three" – 3:04
7. "First Light" – 3:58
8. "Amazing Life" – 4:33
9. "One" – 2:35
