= Photon Band =

- Origin: Philadelphia
- Genres: Indie rock, psychedelic, noise pop
- Years active: 1993–present
- Labels: Darla, Empyrean Records, 100 Guitar Mania, Nod and Smile Records
- Members: Art DiFuria, Jeff Tanner, Patrick Berkery
- Past members: Jason Kourkounis; Gary Plowman; Chris Kubicek

Photon Band is an American indie rock band formed in Philadelphia, PA in 1994. The only constant member is Art DiFuria, who has played with several Philadelphia bands, including Baby Flamehead, Brother JT and Vibrolux, the Brother JT 3 and the Original Sins. Key members have included Simon Nagle (Drums) and Jeff Tanner (bass, guitar, and backing vocals). The band has achieved critical acclaim, but little recognition outside of Philadelphia.

== History ==
=== Early Development ===
A native of the Philadelphia area, DiFuria started playing guitar at a young age. Two main influences on his early musical development were his sister’s participation in a church guitar group and his mother’s work as an astrologer. When he arrived in Philadelphia to study at Temple University in 1985, he became a founding member of Philadelphia punk band Tons of Nuns. He then joined Uptown Bones, who were signed to the Black et Noir (fr) record label run by 1990s French punk band Les Thugs. Upon the demise of the Uptown Bones, DiFuria was asked by Bryan Dilworth to join the Lilys, fronted by Kurt Heasley. DiFuria joined but was experiencing a creative surge that the Lilys could not accommodate. DiFuria came up with the name "Photon Band" for his own band after reading an astrology magazine called Welcome to Planet Earth, which featured an article by Barbara Hand Clow describing a band of photons that would soon envelop the earth (aka the Photon Belt). DiFuria left the Lilys amicably and Heasley named his subsequent album Eccsame the Photon Band "in praise of" DiFuria’s new venture. Photon Band’s first single, "Sitting on the Sunn," appeared on Compulsiv Records in 1994 and featured DiFuria on all instruments. The songs were energetic affairs inspired by the Beatles and the Who, but with a Sonic Youth influenced lo-fi noise element added. Upon hearing this single, James Agren of Darla Records asked DiFuria for more recordings. The result was the 1996 three song CD single "747 (Don’t Worry)." The title track featured a blend of psychedelia and country that presaged the band's later release, "Alone on the Moon," and the sound later developed by the Beachwood Sparks and Darla label-mates, My Morning Jacket.

=== Formation of "Classic" lineup and full-length releases ===
During these early years, DiFuria had enlisted friend and drummer Simon Nagle and bassist Gary Plowman to perform his songs with him. By late 1996, Plowman had left and Jeff Tanner had taken over, stabilizing the band as a live unit. The trio spent the next few years building a repertoire, recording, and releasing singles and compilation tracks. Its first full-length record appeared in 1998 on Darla Records, entitled "All Young in the Soul." Like the earlier releases, the album featured a heavy late 1960s psychedelic influence, with noted off-kilter, "day-glo" overtones. The band was prolific over the next three years. 2000 witnessed two Photon Band releases on Darla: "Our ESP Driven Scene" collected the band’s singles, compilation tracks, and outtakes since their inception, and "Oh the Sweet Sweet Changes" featured new material in the vein of "All Young in the Soul," but quieter. While these releases feature some tracks with DiFuria playing all instruments, they mostly feature Nagle and Tanner on drums and bass, respectively.

=== DiFuria's academic pursuits, changes in sound, and sporadic releases ===
In 2001, DiFuria moved to Newark, Delaware to enter the University of Delaware’s PhD program in Art History. The band ceased to perform live and drummer Nagle quit. The releases from this period show dramatic changes in sound and attitude. In 2001 Darla released "Alone on the Moon," a limited edition, vinyl-only full-length album of three slow, mournful songs inspired by Neil Young's so-called Ditch Trilogy. A description of the album as containing "three fresh, adrenaline fueled songs" is ubiquitous on the internet, but also erroneous, suggesting that a major vendor did not preview the album before publishing a description of its contents, assuming instead that the band's new release sounded like its previous ones. The 2003 album "It’s a Lonely Planet," which received a 7.3 rating from online indie-rock arbiter Pitchfork, continued the theme of loneliness while featuring another radical shift in sound, combining the influences of Syd Barrett, T. Rex, and Hunky Dory-era David Bowie. Though released under the Photon Band name, these last two albums were solo efforts, with DiFuria again recording at home and playing all instruments. It has been stated that "it is no accident that [these] two…albums feature the words ‘alone’ and ‘lonely’ in their titles," suggesting that DiFuria's isolation from friends and his choice to exclude all other musicians gave rise to the recurring themes of alienation and delusion that pervaded his lyrics. The band would not release another album for four years. During this convalescence, "All Young in the Soul" placed 93rd in the Philadelphia Weekly’s list of the "100 Best Philly Albums of all time."

=== Return to activity and expanded lineup ===
In 2007, new label support came from Empyrean Records, which released the digital-only EP, "Get Down Here in the Stratosphere" as a teaser for the 2008 full-length release, "Back Down to Earth." These releases mark the end of the band’s "lonely" period, with DiFuria once again writing uptempo songs with influences as disparate as Jimi Hendrix, the MC5, the Monkees, Stereolab, and Al Green. For support, DiFuria called on Tanner to perform most of the bass duties. Brendan Gallagher plays drums on most of the album's tracks. Also appearing are outside musicians, including but not limited to Dimitri Coats of the Burning Brides, Tracy Stanton of Matt Pond PA, Dave Frank of the Lilys, and Edward Farnsworth of Bardo Pond. The band returned to playing live during this period, with Tanner moving to guitar, longtime friend Chris Kubicek added on bass, and Jason Kourkounis of the Hot Snakes and Burning Brides on drums. Patrick Berkerey of the Pernice Brothers quickly replaced Kourkounis for unknown reasons. The title track of "Back Down to Earth" was chosen by the clothing vendor Free People for use in an online advertisement for their Summer 2009 line. The video contained a direct link for purchase on the iTunes Store and facilitated the band's greatest commercial success when Joey Sweeney embedded it and praised it on his weblog, Philebrity.com, resulting in a spike in sales.

=== DiFuria leaves Philadelphia for Savannah ===
In July 2010, DiFuria announced that he had taken a job at Savannah College of Art and Design and that the band would play what would be its last show before his re-location. In the same interview, he expressed his intention to continue playing and recording, claiming to be at work on a "quadruple album." On stage at the last show, DiFuria is reported to have told the audience that the band would "probably" be back in Philadelphia to play again "in a year." Since moving to Savannah, the band has continued to play and record, albeit sporadically. They have released two albums: 2013's Pure Photonic Matter Volume I, and 2015's Songs of Rapture and Hatred. The former album received praise as "an unanticipated surprise for 2013." The band most notably opened for Champaign, IL's Poster Children on their reunion tour of late 2016. In an early 2018 interview for Blurt (magazine), DiFuria promised "two albums...the next installment in the Pure Photonic Matter series [and] another, probably done around the same time...very long songs, sloppy, poppy, noisy, and primitive, with lots of jamming.
