= Measure (album) =

Studio album by Matt Pond PA
- Released: 2000
- Genre: Indie rock
- Label: Esque/Lancaster Records; File 13
- Producer: Brian McTear

Matt Pond PA chronology
| Deer Apartments (1998) | Measure (2000) | I Thought You Were Sleeping (2001) |

Professional ratings
Review scores
| Source | Rating |
|---|---|
| AllMusic | 4/5 stars |

Measure is the second album by Matt Pond PA, released in 2000.

== Production ==
The album was produced by Brian McTear. Pond rewrote many of the songs during the recording sessions, eventually bringing in a drummer.

== Critical reception ==
Exclaim! wrote that "the winning pop disc thrives on the honeyed tones of Pond's voice and poignant arrangements." The Philadelphia Daily News likened the "folky, string-drenched arrangements" to those of Jeremy Enigk. PopMatters called the album "aching, melancholic, orchestral pop that bordered on gloom and despair without crossing over into the realm of the ominous." In a review of the band's next album, The Green Fury, The A.V. Club deemed Measure "magnificent."

== Track listing ==
1. "Measure 1" – 4:12
2. "The Sound and the Words" – 1:28
3. "The Hollows" – 3:24
4. "Green Grass" – 5:51
5. "Measure 2" – 3:08
6. "Sugar House" – 1:42
7. "New Fall" – 4:38
8. "Competition" – 2:34
9. "Flying Through the Scenery" – 2:08
10. "The Price of Spring" – 3:10
11. "It's Over" – 1:49

== Personnel ==
- Josh Kramer – guitar, bass
- Jim Hosetter – cello
- Rosie McNamara-Jones – violin, backup vocals
- Sean Byrne – drums, percussion
- Matt Pond – vocals, guitar, keys
- Julia Rivers – French horn
- Justin DiFebbos – flute
- Rebecca Cannon – vocals on "Sugar House"
- Brian McTear – guitar, bass, keys, backup vocals, percussion

== Technical personnel ==
- Recorded and produced by Brian McTear at MinerStreet/CycleSound
- Mastered by John Baker at Maja Audio Group
