= Winter Songs (EP) =

Winter Songs EP

EP by Matt Pond PA
- Released: January 25, 2005
- Genre: Indie rock
- Length: 20:11
- Label: Altitude
- Producer: Louie Lino and J Baker

Matt Pond PA chronology
| Emblems (2004) | Winter Songs EP (2005) | Several Arrows Later (2005) |

Singles from Winter Songs EP
- 1. "Snow Day" Released: February 1, 2005

Winter Songs is an EP by Matt Pond PA.

== Track listing ==
All songs written by Matt Pond PA except as noted.

1. "Snow Day" – 3:32
2. "Fall Two" – 1:33
3. "Winterlong" (Neil Young) – 3:17
4. "Winter One" – 1:09
5. "I Want To See The Bright Lights Tonight" (Richard & Linda Thompson) – 3:07
6. "Holiday Road" (Lindsey Buckingham) – 3:39
7. "In The Aeroplane Over The Sea" (Neutral Milk Hotel) – 3:58

Artwork by Jeffery T. Jones and Miriam Kienle.

== Personnel ==
- Eve Miller – cello, vocals
- Brian Pearl – guitar, keyboards, bass
- Dan Crowell – drums, dancing
- Matthew Pond – guitar, vocals
- Louie Lino – keyboards, guitars, vocals
- Eric Ellogen – bass
- Will Levatino – bass

== Technical personnel ==
- Steve Fallone – mastering engineer

== Uses in other media ==
- The song "Snow Day" was featured in a holiday ad for Starbucks.
- The cover of "In The Aeroplane Over The Sea" was used in the third episode of the third season of The O.C.
