= Cité du Havre =

- Neighbourhood
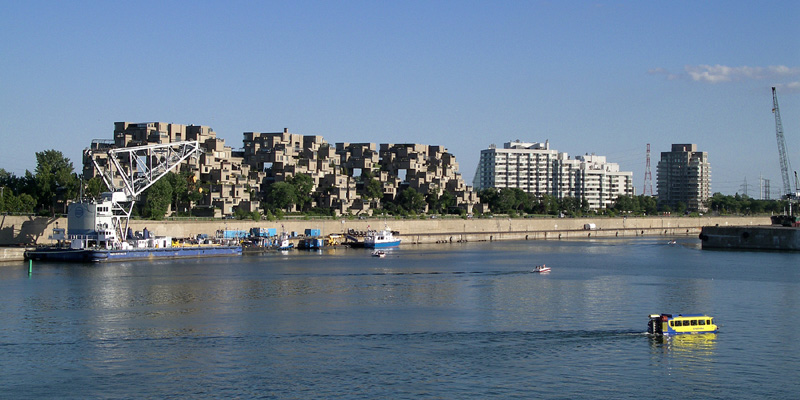
- Habitat 67 and Cité du Havre as seen from the Old Port of Montreal.

- Location of Cité du Havre in Montreal
- Coordinates: 45.494165°N 73.545016°W
- Country: Canada
- Province: Quebec
- City: Montreal
- Borough: Ville-Marie

Area
  - Land: 1.35 km^{2} (0.52 sq mi)

Population (2011)
  - Total: 775
  - Density: 575.4/km^{2} (1,490/sq mi)
  - Change (2006-11): ▲32.7%
  - Dwellings: 534
- Postal Code: H3C
- Area codes: 514, 438

Cité du Havre (French pronunciation: [site dy avʁ]) is a neighbourhood in the borough of Ville-Marie of the city of Montreal, Quebec, Canada. It is located on a narrow man-made peninsula, the Mackay Pier (Jetée Mackay), which was largely built to protect the Old Port of Montreal from the currents of the Saint Lawrence River and from ice banks and floodings in the springtime.

The 775 residents live in one of three modern residential buildings, Habitat 67, Tropiques Nord and Profil-O. The rest is mostly put to light industrial use and constitutes the last functioning part of Montreal's 'Old Port', while modern port functions take place far further downstream in the north-east of the island. It is one of the few neighbourhoods in the borough where there is room for new construction and development.

== History ==
Cité du Havre [Harbour City] is a modern concept, and constitutes what is effectively a modern development of the geography of Montreal. The area is for the most part only as old as the development of the Expo 67 site, which involved using rubble pulled from the development of the Montreal Metro to extend the eastern part of the island, facing the Saint Lawrence River. The Mackay Pier (Jetée Mackay), an entirely man-made peninsula begun in 1891, was completed between 1898 and 1900 and named at first Guard Pier. The Mackay Pier was chosen in 1965 to become part of the site of Expo 67, and then renamed Cité du Havre.

== Expo 67 ==
The peninsula was extended and connected by Pont de la Concorde to Saint Helen's Island for Expo 67. Along with Saint Helen's Island and the artificial Île Notre-Dame, Cité du Havre was the site for Expo 67 pavilions including the Canadian Broadcasting Corporation's International Broadcast Centre, the thematic pavilions "Man in the Community" & "Man and his Health", the Expo 67 Administration Center (now the Montreal Port Authority building), and the Habitat 67 residential complex.

== Recent development ==
Today it also features Dieppe Park (formerly known since 1992 until 2017 as Parc de la Cité-du-Havre), which was a filming location for the 2001 film The Score.
