= Isol =

Argentine artist (born 1972)

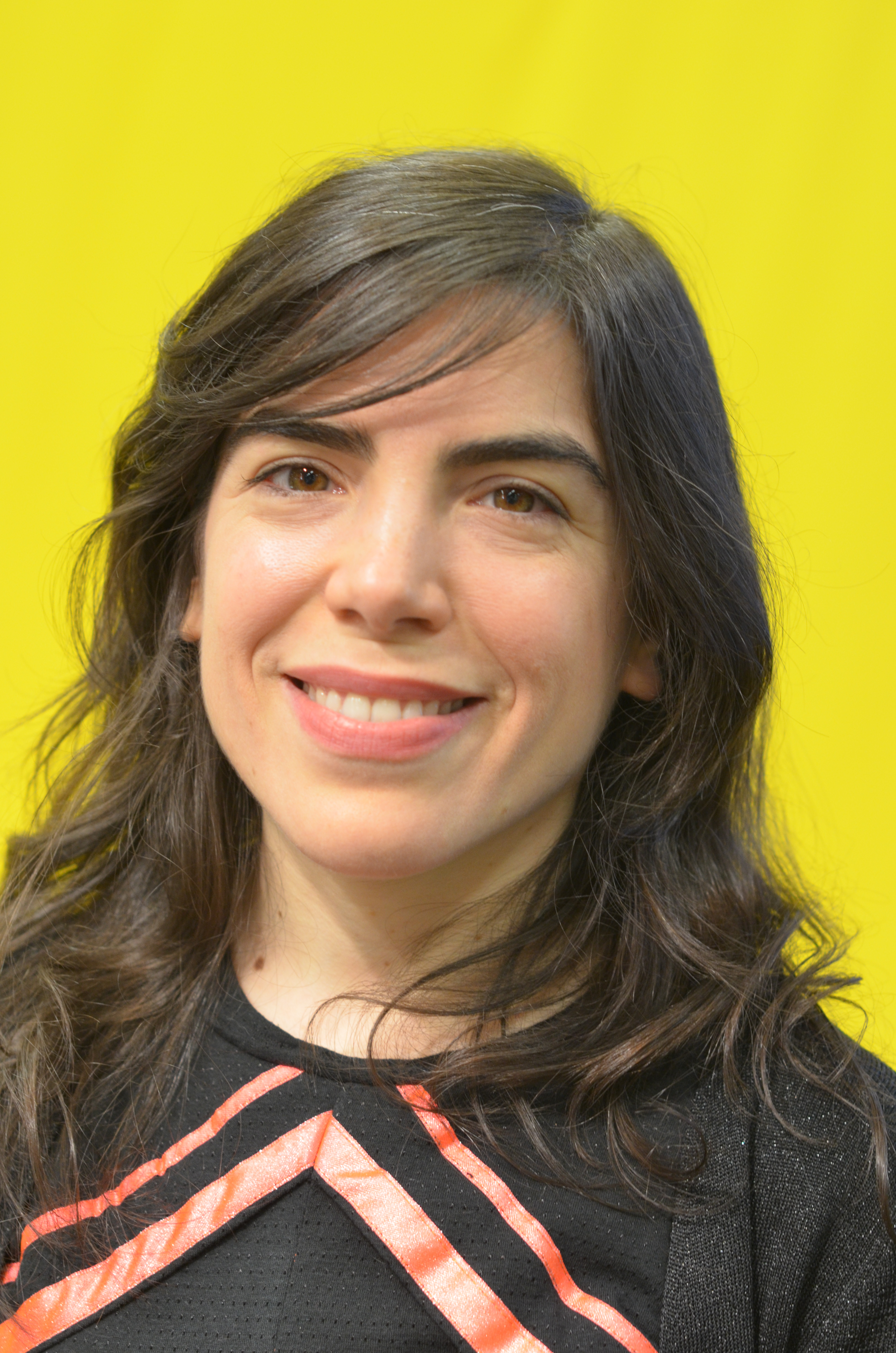
- Isol in September 2013
- Born: Marisol Misenta; March 6, 1972 (age 54); Buenos Aires, Argentina

Marisol Misenta (born 6 March 1972), known professionally under the mononym Isol, is an Argentine creator of children's picture books and a pop singer. For her career contribution to "children's and young adult literature in the broadest sense" she won the Astrid Lindgren Memorial Award from the Swedish Arts Council in 2013, the biggest prize in children's literature.

== Background ==
Isol was born in Buenos Aires where she lives to this day. She studied at the Escuela Nacional "Rogelio Yrurtia" to become a Fine Arts teacher, and spent a few years studying art at the University of Buenos Aires. At some point she abandoned teaching to work full-time as an illustrator and writer of children's books.

Her first book, Vida de perros (A dog's life) was published in 1997, following a Mention of Honour at the contest A la orilla del Viento, organized by FCE publishers (Fondo de Cultura Económica, Mexico). From that moment on she has continued to write books, and has also illustrated texts written by other authors, such as Graciela Montes and Paul Auster.

Her books have been published in Mexico, Spain, USA, France, Korea, Switzerland and Argentina.

From 2000 to 2005 she published a weekly illustration each week in the Sunday magazine of the Clarín (Argentine newspaper), the most widely read paper in Argentina. Her section in the paper involved illustrations of well-known tales for children and young people by established authors. She has also worked for Página/12 newspaper, Para ti and Noticias magazines, among many others.

She has currently focused completely on children's picture-books, though she also does some graphic works and comics from time to time, as special projects, such as the book Consecuencias, a project set up by Casa de América, Spain, in 2000, and the book Under the Spell of the Moon, for Groundwood Books in 2004.

Among other projects, she took part in the BIB ‘99 Workshop for illustrators, organized by UNESCO in Slovakia, and has received the Golden Apple 2003 Award for her illustrations to the book Tic Tac.

Her books El Globo (The Balloon) and El cuento de Navidad de Auggie Wren (Auggie Wren's Christmas Story) have been selected to be part of the White Ravens list 2003, and 2004, the latter involving a Special Mention.

Her book Tener un patito es útil (It's useful to have a duck) was selected by the American Institute of Graphic Arts (AIGA) for their catalogue and exhibition"AIGA 50 Books/50 Covers" (USA). This book won also a Silver Mention in Quórum Awards (Designers Council from Mexico) and it was chosen for the Banco del Libro Best Books 2008 (IBBY Venezuela)

For her body of work as a children's illustrator, Isol Misenta was one of six finalists for the biennial, international Hans Christian Andersen Award in 2006, and one of five finalists for the same award in 2008. She was also awarded with the Astrid Lindgren Memorial award, one of the most prestigoius prizes in the world for Children's Literature, in 2013.https://alma.se/en/laureates/isol/

== Singing career ==
As a singer, she was the vocalist of the band Entre Ríos (band) from 2000 to 2005, with whom she made three records, all published by Indice Virgen (Argentina), Elefant records (Spain and Japan), Darla Records (USA) and Zafra (Mexico). Besides this, she has a Baroque Chamber Music Ensemble called The Excuse since 2002.

In 2004, she was the soloist singer in the play called Nocau, by Krapp dance group, in the Experimental Center of Contemporary Music from the Colon Theater with music of José Halac.

In 2006, she began her collaboration as a singer with the band Alsace Lorraine, started in Chicago in 2000 by Paul Francke. She sang and co-wrote 6 songs on their album Dark One, to be published by Darla Records, USA.

In 2008, she join her brother Zypce in the project SIMA, forming a duo Isol/Zypce. They released a first record called Sima with their own compositions and two songs by the Uruguayan writer Dani Umpi. The record was published in USA by Darla Records and in Argentina by the musicians. In 2014, they published their second work as the band SIMA, together with the musicians Nicolas Cecinini and Pablo Chimenti. The record is called "Novela Gráfica" (Graphic Novel), with 11 songs and 11 comics, in collaboration with talented illustrators and visual artists from many countries. The cd-comic was designed by Laura Varsky (winner of a Latin Grammy as a record designer) and published by Noseso Records and Moebius Editora (Argentina).
