= The Lives Inside the Lines in Your Hand =

Studio album by Matt Pond PA
- Released: February 5, 2013
- Genre: Indie rock
- Length: 35:42
- Label: BMG

Professional ratings
Aggregate scores
| Source | Rating |
|---|---|
| Metacritic | 65/100 |
Review scores
| Source | Rating |
| AllMusic | 3.5/5 stars |
| PopMatters | 6/10 |

The Lives Inside the Lines in Your Hand is the tenth studio album by Matt Pond PA, released on February 5, 2013. At Metacritic, which assigns a weighted average score reviews from mainstream critics, the album received a score of 65 out of 100, based on 7 reviews, indicating "generally favorable reviews".

== Track listing ==
1. "Let Me Live" – 3:42
2. "Love to Get Used" – 3:32
3. "Starlet" – 3:55
4. "When the Moon Brings the Silver" – 3:10
5. "Go Where the Leaves Go" – 3:43
6. "Bring Back the Orchestra" – 3:08
7. "Hole in My Heart" – 3:19
8. "Human Beings" – 3:52
9. "The Lives Inside the Lines in Your Hand" – 4:29
10. "Strafford" – 2:52
11. "Lily 3” (Bonus Track) - 2:56
