= The Nature of Maps =

Studio album by Matt Pond PA
- Released: October 15, 2002
- Genre: Indie rock
- Label: Polyvinyl

Matt Pond PA chronology
The Green Fury (2002)	The Nature of Maps (2002)	Four Songs EP (2004)

Professional ratings
Review scores
Source	Rating
Allmusic	3.5/5 stars

The Nature of Maps is the fourth album from Matt Pond PA, released in 2002.

== Track listing ==
1. "Fairlee " – 3:16
2. "No More" – 4:13
3. "The Party" – 4:17
4. "Closer" – 4:37
5. "New Kehoe NJ" – 1:36
6. "Close Map" – 2:38
7. "No More (Again)" – 1:43
8. "Summer Is Coming" – 4:03
9. "A Well of Tires" – 2:53
10. "A Million Middle Fingers" – 2:00
11. "Promise the Party" – 3:23
12. "Athabasca" – 3:42
