= Sweet Trip =

American experimental/electronic music act

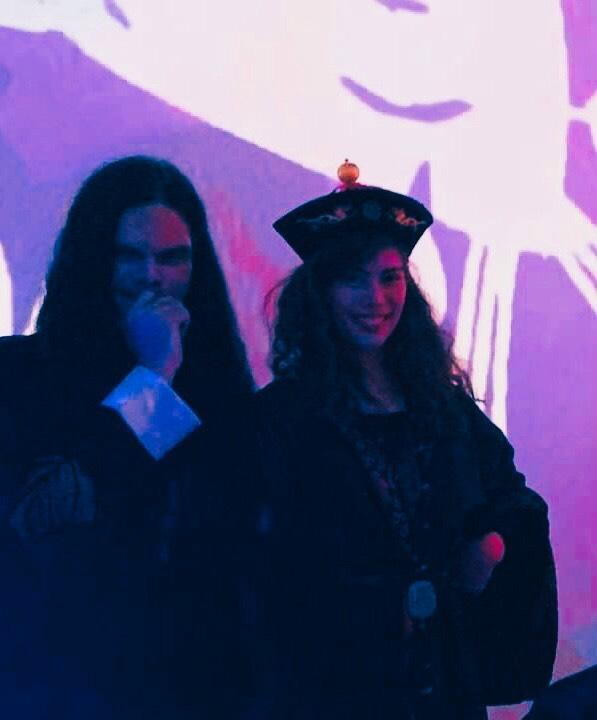
- Roberto Burgos and Valerie Cooper

Background information
- Origin: San Francisco, California, United States
- Genres: Indie electronic; glitch pop; IDM; dream pop; shoegaze; indie pop; indie rock; post-rock; ambient pop
- Years active: 1993–2013, 2019–2022
- Label: Darla
- Past members: Roberto "Roby" Burgos; Valerie Cooper; Viet Le; Aaron Porter; Rob Uytingco

Sweet Trip was an American indie electronic duo formed in 1993 in the Bay Area of California by musicians Valerie Cooper and Roberto Burgos. They are known for their dreamy soundscapes and dense digital production techniques, often blending indie rock and indie pop with electronica, specifically intelligent dance music.

While on hiatus in the mid-2010s, the band gained a cult following online, specifically around their second album, Velocity : Design : Comfort. Sweet Trip reunited in 2019 and released their fourth album A Tiny House, In Secret Speeches, Polar Equals in 2021, the band's first release in 12 years. In 2022, the 50 track compilation Seen / Unseen was released by Darla Records along with the official announcement that Sweet Trip would disband.

== History ==
=== Formation and early years (1993–2002) ===
The group was formed in 1993 by producer and songwriter Roberto Burgos when he met former band-member Viet Le at a high school talent show sign-up that summer. The two would spend weekends listening to songs in Le's garage, performing jam sessions with Burgos on guitar and Le on drums. It is through this and a mutual acquaintance that they met Valerie Cooper, and the three formed a band under the name Ophelia Satellite. Initially, the band attempted to write songs as a "traditional guitar, bass, and drums" group, albeit lacking a bass player. Despite this, they began playing these original songs live, but eventually took a break as they were unable to find someone to play bass. During this break, Burgos began recording lo-fi demos to cassette with more electronic elements than their previous work, and it was through these demos that the band decided to change course and pursue a less traditional style where their live performances would not need a bass player. Burgos jokingly labelled these cassettes "The Sweet Trip", which eventually became the band's new name. Five of these demos were later printed onto cassette tapes and sent to several indie labels, one of which was Darla Records. According to Cooper, they were one of the first labels to show genuine interest in their work, and so the band signed on with them; songs from the cassette sent to Darla would eventually be part of the track list of their debut's album Halica: Bliss Out v.11.

Burgos, Le and Cooper eat pizza together during a session recording vocals for the title track of Alura.

After the release of Halica (and its sister EP Fish Remixes & Versions) the band continued to release new material, contributing songs to the Darla compilation series Little Darla Has a Treat for You and Drum & Bliss. Only a few months after the release of Halica, the band released the followup EP Alura, which featured their first use of computers and computer software in the music creation process. The band were also invited to live shows and festivals, such as SXSW 1999. During these live performances, the band would play early versions of songs "Dsco" and "Velocity", which would find their way to the album Velocity : Design : Comfort years later. As the band's sound became more focused on electronics, Le would take over as sound engineer for the band's "ever-growing" live kit, with Aaron Porter joining to take over his former bassist duties.

=== Follow-ups and hiatus (2003–2018) ===
After a year and a half break to record new music, the band released their second album, Velocity : Design : Comfort, in 2003. Whilst receiving little mainstream attention, the album garnered positive reviews at the time, with AllMusic giving the album four and a half stars and labelling it "one of the most interesting and best records of 2003". After this, the band contributed the Velocity outtake "Noise Is a Social Skill (V.0.8)" to volume 24 of the Little Darla compilation series in 2004, and proceeded to go on another long hiatus.

In 2006, Sweet Trip reunited once again, with founding member Viet Le departing; Rob Uytingco joined the band, adding live drums to their performances and recordings. The band played rearrangements of songs from their previous album alongside new songs, these new songs would eventually be released on their third album, You Will Never Know Why, released in 2009. YWNKW featured a departure from the band's previous releases, with reviewers noting that it had a more traditional "streamlined indie pop" sound and that it was possibly the band's most accessible album to date. This would be Sweet Trip's last release as a four-piece band, with the band releasing no new material before entering yet another hiatus four years later, and Porter and Uytingco not rejoining for their fourth and final album.

In 2013, Burgos posted a new song, "Things to Ponder While Falling," on his SoundCloud account. He referred to it as "Probably the last Sweet Trip song ever." (later updated to "*not* the last Sweet Trip song ever,") informally announcing the band's hiatus. During the hiatus, Burgos began uploading music to SoundCloud and Bandcamp under the name Blacktunic, while Cooper uploaded unreleased, rare and alternate Sweet Trip recordings on her personal SoundCloud.

While the group was on hiatus, their 2003 album Velocity : Design : Comfort garnered a cult following online. This led to increased interest in Sweet Trip and re-releases of their discography, with people reaching out online to interview the band; Burgos credits these interviews for reconnecting him and Cooper and leading to the band reforming.

=== Re-releases, reunion, and breakup (2019–2022) ===
In August 2019, Darla Records commented on a Facebook post about Velocity : Design : Comfort, announcing that the album would be printed on vinyl for the first time as a double LP in 2020. Following this, Burgos posted an update to his Twitter account, stating: "We've realized that we can't put out a VDC vinyl reissue without following up with new music, and that's an exciting realization." Soon after this, Burgos and Cooper began doing interviews together as Sweet Trip, officially reforming the band as a duo. In early 2020, Sweet Trip released their first new song since 2013, "In Sound, We Found Each Other", on the Little Darla Has a Treat for You, Vol. 30 compilation.

On November 8, 2020, Sweet Trip announced the title of their fourth album, A Tiny House, In Secret Speeches, Polar Equals, which was released digitally on May 28, 2021. Alongside this, a single was announced titled "Walkers Beware! We Drive Into the Sun", which was released on January 15, 2021. On January 22, 2021, they released a remastered version of You Will Never Know Why, with new artwork and three new songs.

On January 7, 2022, Burgos announced on his Twitter that an "Expanded Edition" of Halica would be released on February 11, with a reorganized track list and material from their Fish EP released around the same period.

On March 18, Darla Records released the compilation album Seen / Unseen, which was put together prior to Cooper's departure, and formally announced Sweet Trip's disbandment. Soon after, Darla Records announced that a re-release of the Alura EP with five additional tracks would be coming May 27.

=== Other activities ===
Label mates Junior Varsity KM — for whom Burgos has done several remixes — have toured with Sweet Trip on several occasions. Other notable outfits Burgos has done remixes for include Takako Minekawa, Club 8 and Gnac.

== Musical influences ==
In a December 2020 Sonemic interview, Burgos and Cooper listed Aphex Twin, My Bloody Valentine, Slowdive, Sonic Youth, the Black Dog, Broadcast, Moose, Seefeel, Cocteau Twins, Pale Saints, the Chameleons, Jean Sibelius, and Sérgio Mendes as musical inspirations for Sweet Trip.

== Legacy ==
While initially an underground act with little following, Sweet Trip gained a cult following online in the decades proceeding the release of their first three albums, with their music being shared across music boards and dedicated music sites such as Album of The Year and Rate Your Music, even becoming Internet memes. Following their initial disbandment in 2013, the band became aware of their internet presence some time around 2017, leading to their reformation in 2019. Following this, they reissued their album Velocity : Design : Comfort in 2020, which at this point had become a cult classic release; music outlets such as Far Out Magazine list Velocity : Design : Comfort as one of the best shoegaze albums of all time.

In popular media, Sweet Trip's song "Dsco" appeared in the 2007 reboot of Bionic Woman, while their song "Palomar, Your Shadow is the Yellow Sun" was featured in the trailer for the 22nd San Francisco International Asian American Film Festival.

In 2022, Stereogum noted how Sweet Trip became "as canonically important to young alt-rockers as the Pixies and Built to Spill were to previous generations" regarding the new wave of American shoegaze.

== Discography ==
=== Studio albums ===
- Halica: Bliss Out v.11 (1998, Darla Records)
- Velocity : Design : Comfort (2003, Darla Records)
- You Will Never Know Why (2009, Darla Records)
- A Tiny House, In Secret Speeches, Polar Equals (2021, Darla Records)

=== Compilations ===
- Seen / Unseen (2022, Darla Records)

=== EPs and singles ===
- Fish Remixes and Versions (1998, Darla Records)
- Alura (1999, Darla Records)
- "Design1:Dedicated" (2003, Observatory)
- "Walkers Beware! We Drive into the Sun" b/w "Stab/Slow" (2021, Darla Records)
