= Measuring coalgebra =

In algebra, a measuring coalgebra of two algebras A and B is a coalgebra enrichment of the set of homomorphisms from A to B. In other words, if coalgebras are thought of as a sort of linear analogue of sets, then the measuring coalgebra is a sort of linear analogue of the set of homomorphisms from A to B. In particular its group-like elements are (essentially) the homomorphisms from A to B. Measuring coalgebras were introduced by Sweedler (1968, 1969).

== Definition ==
A coalgebra C with a linear map from C×A to B is said to measure A to B if it preserves the algebra product and identity (in the coalgebra sense). If we think of the elements of C as linear maps from A to B, this means that c(a_{1}a_{2}) = Σc_{1}(a_{1})c_{2}(a_{2}) where Σc_{1}⊗c_{2} is the coproduct of c, and c multiplies identities by the counit of c. In particular if c is grouplike this just states that c is a homomorphism from A to B. A measuring coalgebra is a universal coalgebra that measures A to B in the sense that any coalgebra that measures A to B can be mapped to it in a unique natural way.

== Examples ==
- The group-like elements of a measuring coalgebra from A to B are the homomorphisms from A to B.
- The primitive elements of a measuring coalgebra from A to B are the derivations from A to B.
- If A is the algebra of continuous real functions on a compact Hausdorff space X, and B is the real numbers, then the measuring coalgebra from A to B can be identified with finitely supported measures on X. This may be the origin of the term "measuring coalgebra".
- In the special case when A = B, the measuring coalgebra has a natural structure of a Hopf algebra, called the Hopf algebra of the algebra A.
