= If You Want Blood (EP) =

If You Want Blood EP

EP by Matt Pond PA
- Released: June 5, 2007
- Genre: Indie rock
- Label: Altitude
- Producer: Matthew Pond, John O'Mahony, and Thom Monahan

Matt Pond PA chronology
Several Arrows Later (2005)	If You Want Blood EP (2007)	Last Light (2007)

If You Want Blood EP is the preceding EP by Matt Pond PA to his seventh studio album, Last Light.

== Track listing ==
1. "Reading" – 3:27
2. "Magic Boyfriend" – 2:25
3. "Everything Until The East Coast Ends" – 5:48
4. "If You Live" – 5:03
5. "If You Want Blood" – 4:06

== Personnel ==
- Dan Crowell – drums, percussion, organ
- Steven Jewett – guitar, bass, banjo
- Matthew Pond – guitar, vocals
- Brian Pearl – piano, guitar, organ, wurlitzer
- Chris Hansen – piano
- Thom Monahan – guitar, vocals, keyboards
- John O'Mahony – guitar
- Jane Scarpantoni – cello
- David Gold – viola
- Antoine Silverman – violin
- Max Moston – violin

== Technical personnel ==
- Produced by Matthew Pond, John O'Mahony, and Thom Monahan
- Engineered by John O'Mahony, Chris Hansen and Thom Monahan
- Mixed by John O'Mahony
