= Matt Pond PA =

Band that plays indie rock

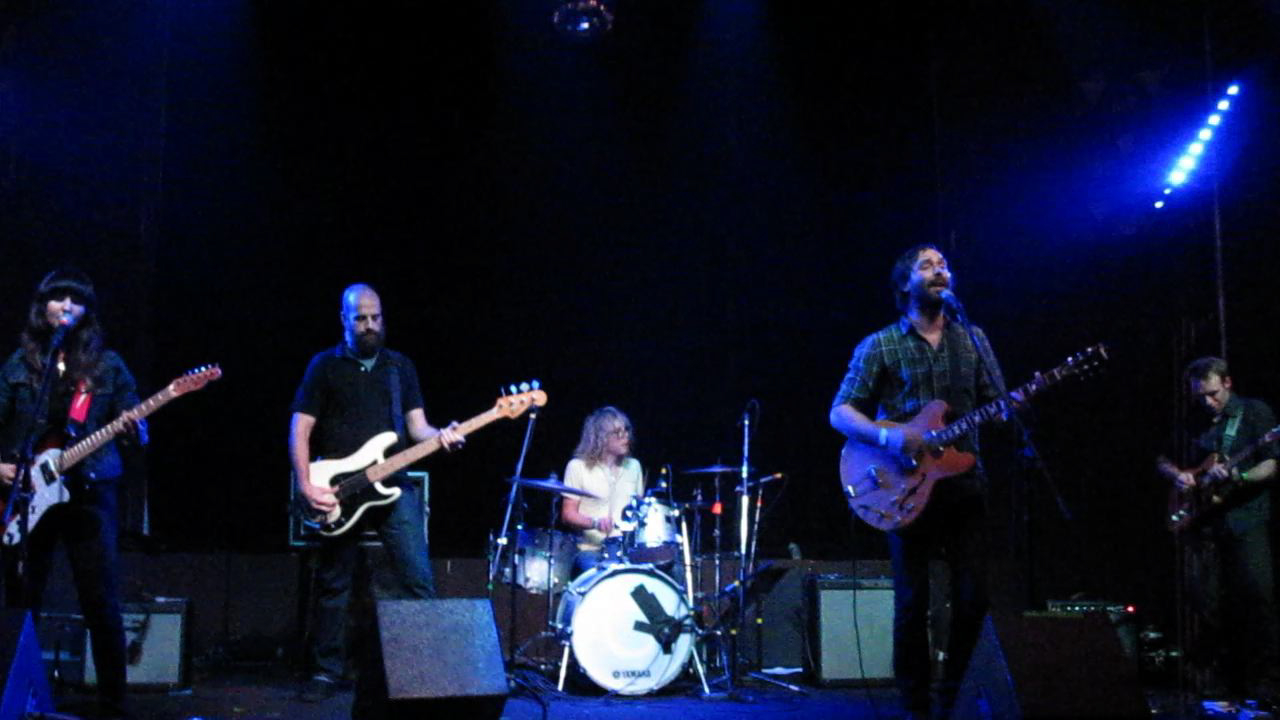

Background information
- Origin: Philadelphia, Pennsylvania
- Genre: Indie rock
- Years active: 1998–2022, 2023–present
- Label: 131 Records 131records.co
- Members: Matt Pond; Chris Hansen
- Past members: Rosie McNamara-Jones; Dana Feder; Josh Kramer; Jim Hostetter; Sean Byrne; Mike Kennedy; Matt Raisch; Jim Kehoe; Eve Miller; Will Levatino; Dan Mitha; Brian Pearl; Cory Popp; Steve Jewett; Brad Gunyon; Aram Deradoorian; Leslie Sisson; George Souleidis; Dan Crowell; Shawn Alpay; Kyle Kelly-Yahner (Touring); Tierney Tough (Touring); Tre Hester (Touring); Sammi Niss (Touring); Hilary James (Touring, and with The Natural Lines); John Courage (The Natural Lines); Dan Ford (The Natural Lines)
- Website: www.mattpondpa.com

Matt Pond PA is a New York–based band formed in Philadelphia by singer-songwriter Matt Pond. It has released numerous LPs, EPs, and singles.

Throughout the years Pond enlisted a rotating cast of collaborators for recording and touring, including cellists Jim Hostetter and Eve Miller, violinist Rosie McNamara-Jones, drummers Mike Kennedy and Dan Crowell, bassists Matt Raisch and Josh Kramer, and guitarists Jim Kehoe and Brian Pearl. Chris Hansen, producer and guitarist, has been a core member of the group since 2007. Cellist Shawn Alpay, who performs individually as Completions, has recorded and toured as a member of the band.

Matt Pond announced on October 30, 2017, on his website and social media accounts that he would be retiring the Matt Pond PA moniker but would continue making music with Hansen, briefly considering the name The Dark Leaves before finding out it had already been taken. However, Pond and Hansen continued to release music under the name Matt Pond PA until 2022, when they briefly transitioned to performing as The Natural Lines, before eventually returning to Matt Pond PA in late 2023.

== Current members ==
- Matt Pond – vocals, guitar _{(1998–2022, 2023–present)}
- Chris Hansen – guitar, vocals _{(2010–2022, 2023–present)}

== History ==
=== Early history (1998–2002) ===
Debuting in 1998 with Deer Apartments, the band quickly gained momentum through claiming top honors in an unsigned bands competition sponsored by CDNow. Their sophomore album, Measure, was released in 2000, and a follow-up EP, I Thought You Were Sleeping, was issued the following year. The band's first release on Polyvinyl, The Green Fury, was released in the spring of 2002, and The Nature of Maps followed soon after.

=== Emblems, Several Arrows Later, Last Light, The Freeep, and The Threeep (2004–2009) ===
Pond relocated to Brooklyn in 2003 and recorded the band's breakthrough album, Emblems, which was released on Altitude in 2004. In 2005 the band issued the seasonal EP Winter Songs, which gained a larger following when Starbucks used the song "Snow Day" in a television commercial. Several months later, they released their sixth full-length LP, entitled Several Arrows Later. 2007 saw the launch of If You Want Blood and Last Light. In 2008 the band released a free EP entitled The Freeep which was later sold under the name Auri Sacra Fames in 2009. An EP called The Threeep was also released in 2009.

=== The Dark Leaves, The Lives Inside the Lines in Your Hand, and The State of Gold (2010–2017) ===
Holing up in a cabin in Upstate New York, Pond recorded The Dark Leaves with producer Chris Hansen and several other guest musicians in 2010. In 2011, Matt Pond PA released his EP titled Spring Fools, which included three songs. One of the songs, "Love to Get Used", was featured later on in the Vince Vaughn movie Delivery Man in 2013. 2013 saw the brief removal of “PA” from the band name and the release of The Lives Inside the Lines in Your Hand. The band recorded and released 2015's The State of Gold while simultaneously playing anniversary tours for both Emblems and Several Arrows Later.

=== Winter Lives, Still Summer, Free Fall, A Collection of Bees, Pt. 1, The State of Gold reissue, retirement of name (2016–2022) ===
Matt Pond launched 131 Records in the summer of 2016 from a desire to retain complete control over his musical process. He uses Patreon, a platform that allows fans to directly interact and contribute to the artist, to fund the endeavor.

On November 11, 2016, Matt Pond PA released their eleventh album, Winter Lives. Keeping with the seasonal theme, Still Summer followed on August 11, 2017.

On October 30, 2017, Matt Pond announced via his website and social media accounts, "...It is time to say goodbye to the oddly named Matt Pond PA. We'll soon release a reprising holiday EP. And these shows in December will be the last we play under that honorific. (Or at least for a long, long, long, long, long, long time.) Whatever happens next, I will continue to make music. We’re focusing the crux of our upcoming efforts here. Just without my name on all the baloney. It's time for a different brand of baloney..."

The band released what at the time was considered to be its final EP, More Winter Lives, on November 21, 2017, and final show on December 16, 2017, in Kingston, New York.

Until 2022, Matt Pond continued to publish music under the name Matt Pond PA. Matt Pond and Chris Hansen released the album Free Fall on October 30, 2018. Matt Pond PA released A Collection of Bees, Pt. 1 on February 7, 2020. and Songs of Disquiet on August 7, 2020. After reacquiring the rights to 2015's The State of Gold from their former record label, the band released a "resequenced, remastered and partially re-recorded" version of the album on September 24, 2021.

On August 31, 2022, the Matt Pond PA moniker would officially be retired, and Pond and Hansen would be releasing music under the name The Natural Lines. The announcement coincided with a new single, "The Problem is Me" and a debut EP pre-order.

=== Return (2023–present) ===
After releasing a self-titled LP as The Natural Lines in early 2023, through label Bella Union, Pond decided to revive the Matt Pond PA moniker in October 2023. Pond, “Our album as The Natural Lines was one of my favorite experiences in making music. We thoughtfully built songs and a band that represented the inner world of the post-pandemic return to reality. But as it stands now, I’ve said everything I can in that incarnation. I gave myself a strange band name back in Philly and it's been impossible to shake. As much as I love to run, there's no running from who I am.” The band released a single and music video, "Imagining Everything", to coincide with their return, followed by a second single, "Halloween Two", in November. Additional plans include an EP and tour.

== Discography ==
=== Albums ===
| Title | Album details | Peak chart positions | |
| Title | Album details | US Heat | US Indie |
|---|---|---|---|
| Deer Apartments | Released: 1998; Label: Lancaster Records | — | — |
| Measure | Released: 2000; Label: File 13 Records | — | — |
| The Green Fury | Released: January 22, 2002; Label: Polyvinyl Records | — | — |
| The Nature of Maps | Released: October 15, 2002; Label: Polyvinyl Records | — | — |
| Emblems | Released: May 4, 2004; Label: Altitude Records | — | — |
| Several Arrows Later | Released: October 11, 2005; Label: Altitude Records | — | — |
| Last Light | Released: September 25, 2007; Label: Altitude Records | 11 | 43 |
| The Dark Leaves | Released: April 13, 2010; Label: Altitude Records | 33 | — |
| The Lives Inside the Lines in Your Hand | As "Matt Pond"; Released: February 5, 2013; Label: BMG | — | — |
| Skeletons and Friends | Released: April 1, 2014; Label: 131 Records | — | — |
| The State of Gold | Released: June 30, 2015; Label: Doghouse Records | 9 | 36 |
| Winter Lives | Released: November 11, 2016; Label: 131 Records | — | — |
| Still Summer | Released: August 11, 2017; Label: 131 Records | — | — |
| A Collection of Bees, Pt. 1 | Released: February 7, 2020; Label: 131 Records | — | — |
| The State of Gold (re-issue) | Released: September 24, 2021; Label: 131 Records; Remastered, resequenced, and new production | — | — |
| The Natural Lines (self-titled) | As "The Natural Lines"; Released: March 24, 2023; Label: Bella Union | — | — |
| The Ballad of the Natural Lines | Released: February 14, 2025; Label: Sonder House; Formats: Digital download, CD, LP | — | — |
"—" denotes album that did not chart or was not released

=== EPs ===
- I Thought You Were Sleeping (2001)
- This Is Not the Green Fury (2001), vinyl only
- Four Songs (2004)
- Winter Songs (2005)
- If You Want Blood (2007)
- The Freeep (2008), download only
- Spring Fools (2011)
- The Natural Lines (2013)
- Threeep (2013), download only
- Free the Fawns! (2016), download only
- Double Freeture (2017), download only
- More Winter Lives (2017), download only
- Early B-Sides, download only
- Songs of Disquiet (2020), download only
- This Is Not The State of Gold (2021), download only
- First Five by The Natural Lines (2022), download only
- Call and Response with Alexa Rose (2023), CD

=== Singles ===
- Lily Two/Golden Brown (2004)
- Halloween (2005)
- Snow Day/Holiday Road (2005)
- So Much Trouble (2005)
- Sunlight (2007)
- People Have a Way (2007)
- Starting (2009), vinyl only
- Remains (2010), download only
- Love To Get Used (2013), promo only
- Hole in My Heart (2013), download only
- Ruins (2013), download only
- Drive with Anya Marina (2017), download only
- Specks (Redux) with Anya Marina (2020), download only
- Imagining Everything (2023), download only
- Halloween Two (2023), download only
- Connecticut (2024), download only
- The Ballad of the Natural Lines (November 8, 2024), download only

=== With Chris Hansen ===
- Lebanon, PA (2011)
- Free Fall (2018)

=== Other songs ===
- "Green Shirt" (Elvis Costello cover) from Almost You: The Songs of Elvis Costello (2002)
- "Champagne Supernova" (Oasis cover) from The OC: Mix 4 (2005)
- "I'm Not Okay" (My Chemical Romance cover) from Guilt by Association Vol. 2 (2008)
