= The Green Fury =

Studio album by Matt Pond PA
- Released: January 22, 2002
- Genre: Indie rock
- Label: Polyvinyl

Matt Pond PA chronology
This Is Not The Green Fury (2001)	The Green Fury (2002)	The Nature of Maps (2002)

Professional ratings
Review scores
Source	Rating
AllMusic	4/5 stars
Pitchfork Media	1.8/10

This Is Not The Green Fury EP

The Green Fury is the third album from Matt Pond PA, released in 2002. It was preceded by This Is Not the Green Fury, released on limited edition 7" green vinyl at the end of 2001.

== Track listing ==
1. "Canadian Song" – 3:06
2. "Measure 3" – 3:33
3. "Neighbor's New Yard" – 1:03
4. "City Plan" – 4:06
5. "Promise the Bite" – 2:57
6. "Silence" – 2:40
7. "This Is Montreal" – 1:20
8. "A Part of the Woods" – 3:22
9. "A New Part of Town" – 4:03
10. "Jefferson" – 2:36
11. "Crickets" – 3:46
12. "It Becomes Night" – 2:35
13. "Copper Mine" – 3:49
