= Lenola (band) =

American indie rock band

- Origin: New Jersey
- Genres: Noise pop, indie rock, lo-fi, experimental rock
- Years active: 1994–2003
- Labels: Fuzzybox, Blackbean & Placenta, Tappersize, File 13, 2nd Story, Homesleep
- Past members: Jay Laughlin; David Grubb; Scott Colan; Sean Byrne; Chris Laughlin

Lenola was an American indie rock band formed in New Jersey in 1994, originally envisioned as a four-track project by lead man Jay Laughlin, but with the addition of guitarist David Grubb and drummer Sean Byrne, eventually became a standard band. After the addition of bassist Scott Colan and keyboard player Chris Laughlin, Lenola released several singles on the self-funded Tappersize label before releasing their first album in 1996. In 2001, File Thirteen Records released their full-length CD, Treat Me To Some Life. Their final album, 2003's Sharks & Flames double CD was released in Japan and Europe but has yet to be issued in the US. Powered by strong guitars, Lenola has been compared to My Bloody Valentine, The Boo Radleys, Mercury Rev, and The Flaming Lips. In 2003, the group disbanded.

== Members ==
- Sean Byrne - drums (later of folk-rock group Twin Atlas)
- Scott Colan - bass guitar (now creates and sells Puddledrums)
- David Grubb - guitar (later of Like a Fox)
- Jay Laughlin - vocals (formerly of Turning Point, later of Like a Fox, Honey)
- Chris Laughlin - keyboards

== Discography ==
all on Tappersize unless stated

=== Albums ===
- The Last 10 Feet of the Suicide Mile (1996)
- The Swerving Corpse (1997)
- My Invisible Name (1999)
- Treat Me To Some Life (2001) File 13
- Sharks & Flames (2003) Homesleep

=== EPs ===
- The Resurrection of the Close-Up on the Magic Spot 7-inch (1998) Fuzzy Box
- The Day the Laughter Smelled 12-inch (1998) Blackbean & Placenta
- The Electric Tickle (2000)

=== Singles ===
- "Discount Oatmeal"/"Greedo" 7-inch (1994)
- "Tarred Dog Saved"/"Frisbee Weekend" 7-inch (1995)
- "Slipping Under the Shadows" one-sided 7-inch (2000) Earworm
- "Keep Coming Back" (2001) 2nd Story

=== Split releases ===
- "I Shared a Route with Jim"/"Slap Me" 7-inch EP (1996) Lounge - split with The Asteroid No. 4
- "Hidden Wheel" (1999), Earworm - split with Photon Band
- Dr. Picklefeather's Electric Soothing-Music and Calmative CD EP (2001) Tappersize/Devil in the Woods - split with Fiver
