= SoundsXP =

British online music magazine

SoundsXP was a UK based music webzine. It was set up in 2001 and entirely based on contributions from unpaid writers. The site mostly published reviews and interviews covering primarily the indie, indiepop, shoegaze, folk, alt-country and electronica musical genres. It also covered alternative music news and free MP3 downloads. The front page included a regularly updated music player which showcased current songs recommended by the writers. In addition, SoundsXP had forums to allow for discussion and comments on the articles, as well as live event notices which were free to use for bands and promoters for publicity. The site organised a number of live events over the years featuring artists such as the Broken Family Band, the Bishops, Younghusband, Pete and the Pirates and many more.

SoundsXP ceased updating in 2017, due to the increased use in use of social media and free music platforms such as YouTube and Spotify

== Record Label ==
In 2006 the webzine set up a label, Sounds eXPerience, with limited 7" releases by Piney Gir's Country Roadshow, the Schla La Las, the Bridge Gang, Santa Dog and a split release by Esiotrot and Foxes!.
