= Darla Records =

American record label

- Founded: 1993
- Founder: James Agren
- Genre: Indie rock; indie pop; post-rock; ambient pop; indie electronic
- Country of origin: United States
- Location: New York
- Official website: darla.com

Darla Records is an independent record label founded in 1993. It also serves as a distributor and online retailer. Darla Records is home to over 200 exclusively distributed labels including Ad Noiseam, Audio Dregs Recordings, Ici d'Ailleurs, Elefant, LTM, Le Grand Magistery, Matinee, Ohm Resistance, Siesta, and Words On Music.

== Background ==
James Agren founded Darla in October 1993 while he was taking residence in New York. Its first release was a 7-inch by Grifters, an indie rock/lo-fi band from Memphis. Before long, Darla outgrew its one-bedroom apartment and 350 sq ft (33 m^{2}). ground floor office space in San Francisco. James and Chandra relocated Darla to Sacramento, California in October 2000. Darla moved in October 2002 to Vista, California.

The Little Darla Has A Treat For You semi-quarterly compilation series features artists and labels Darla Records works with closely, and is very popular. This series was named as a parody of the Little Debbie snack treats' slogan. Darla started selling music online in 1996. In February 2007, readers of and journalists from the American webzine Somewhere Cold voted Darla as the record label of the year on their 2006 Somewhere Cold Awards Hall of Fame. in 2009, Darla began offering digital downloads from their own website. James Agren and Chandra Tobey run Darla Records from a 1,250 sq ft (116 m^{2}) barn on their avocado and cherimoya farm in the hills of north San Diego county.

== Bliss Out series ==
In 1996, Darla Records pursued the creation of a two-disc compilation focusing on contemporary trends in atmosphere-oriented indie music overlapping with chill-out music and shoegaze, which critics later gave the term ambient pop. The moniker for the series is a reference to the book Blissed Out: The Rapture of Rock by the English music critic Simon Reynolds, who had previously focused on these stylistic overlaps in coining post-rock in the first wave. They received submissions from the New Jersey band Flowchart, and Darla instead asked them to produce Tenjira, the first album in what became the Bliss Out series. The series, which increasingly grew in stylistic diversity over its course, ended in 2004 after 20 albums with the release of Manual's The North Shore. The releases in this series are:

- Tenjira (Flowchart)
- Antarctica (Windy & Carl)
- Silver Lining Underwear (Orange Cake Mix)
- Perception (Amp)
- Venoy (Füxa)
- Stereoscopic Soundwaves (Tomorrowland)
- Anadromous (Mirza)
- Wading & Waiting (Transient Waves)
- Late One Sunday & The Following Morning (American Analog Set)
- Taking Care of You (Junior Varsity KM)
- Halica (Sweet Trip)
- Blue Christian (Bright)
- A Trick of the Sea (Piano Magic)
- The Long Goodbye (The Cat's Miaow)
- Zero Population Growth (Lilys)
- Normal Control Range (Technicolor)
- Aida (Mus)
- ...Or You Could Just Go Through Your Whole Life And Be Happy Anyway. (Aarktica)
- Belmondo (Japancakes)
- The North Shore (Manual)

== Acts on label ==
Since its inception, Darla has been host to several notable acts. Musical outfits whose recordings have been released by this label include:

- Aarktica
- Alsace Lorraine
- American Analog Set
- Amp
- Ariel Abshire
- Auburn Lull
- Bright
- Bvdub
- California Oranges
- Desario
- Flare
- Flowchart
- Follow the Train
- Füxa
- Hammock
- Harold Budd
- Holiday Flyer
- hollAnd
- I Am Robot and Proud
- ISAN
- Japancakes
- Junior Varsity KM
- LD & the New Criticism
- Lilys
- Lowlights
- Mahogany
- Manual
- Maquiladora
- Mirza
- Momus
- My Morning Jacket
- New Radiant Storm King
- Orange Cake Mix
- Pale Horse and Rider
- Photon Band
- Piano Magic
- Rhian Sheehan
- Robin Guthrie
- Rocketship
- Rumskib
- Saloon
- Sisterhood of Convoluted Thinkers
- Sprites
- Superdrag
- Stafrænn Hákon
- Steven R. Smith
- Sweet Trip
- The Radio Dept.
- 30 Amp Fuse
- Tomorrowland
- Tullycraft
- Voxtrot
- Windy & Carl

== See also ==
- List of record labels
