= Cast from the Platform =

Studio album by Auburn Lull
- Released: May 17, 2004
- Recorded: Spring–Fall 2003 at Walnut Bend, Bare Farm Equipment, Janson's and Sean's Houses, Studio Renovo, Eighth and Ninth Simultaneous Workshops
- Genre: Ambient, dream pop, post-rock, ethereal wave
- Length: 57:43
- Label: Darla
- Producer: Andrew Prinz

Auburn Lull chronology
Alone I Admire (1999)	Cast from the Platform (2004)	Regions Less Parallel (2005)

Professional ratings
Review scores
Source	Rating
AllMusic	link
Pitchfork	(8.0/10) link

Cast from the Platform is the second album by American dream pop band Auburn Lull, released May 17, 2004 by Darla Records. It was produced by Andrew Prinz of Mahogany.

== Track listing ==
All tracks written by Auburn Lull.

1. "Building Fifty" – 5:01
2. "Sinking Meridian" – 1:52
3. "Jersey Narrows" – 3:57
4. "Season of False Starts" – 4:16
5. "Deterior" – 5:43
6. "Direction & Destination" – 5:02
7. "Rising Meridian" – 1:37
8. "Seaforth" – 4:57
9. "Trenches" – 4:53
10. "Sovereign Messages" – 3:41
11. "Shallow in Youth" – 6:35
12. hidden track – 10:09

== Personnel ==
- Kevin Bartley – mastering
- Sean Heenan – guitar, vocals, oscillator
- Jason Kolb – organ, synthesizer, bass, guitar, tapes
- Robert Gerard Pietrusko – additional engineering and mixing
- Andrew Prinz – synthesizer, piano, arranger, cello, vocals, design, photography, instrumentation
