= Alone I Admire =

Studio album by Auburn Lull
- Released: February 14, 1999
- Recorded: Summer 1997–Spring 1998 at First, Second and Third Simultaneous Workshops
- Genre: Ambient, dream pop, post-rock, ethereal wave
- Length: 47:17
- Label: Burnt Hair, Darla
- Producer: Andrew Prinz

Auburn Lull chronology
| Alone I Admire (1999) | Cast from the Platform (2004) |

Professional ratings
Review scores
| Source | Rating |
|---|---|
| AllMusic | 4/5 stars |
| Pitchfork | (9.0/10) |

Alone I Admire is the debut album from American dream pop band Auburn Lull, released on February 14, 1999 on Burnt Hair Records. The album was reissued by Darla Records in 2002.

== Track listing ==
1. "Stockard Drive" – 4:34
2. "Desert" – 3:23
3. "Old Mission" – 3:18
4. "Blur My Thoughts Again" – 4:50
5. "Early Evening Reverie" – 3:58
6. "The Last Beat" – 3:48
7. "Tidal" – 2:55
8. "Between Trains" – 5:37
9. "Finland Station" – 4:17
10. Untitled – 10:37
