= Majesty Crush =

American indie rock band

- Origin: Detroit, Michigan, United States
- Genres: Shoegaze, dream pop, indie rock
- Years active: 1990–1995
- Labels: Vulva, Chameleon/Dali, Davies Productions, Ché Trading, Numero Group
- Spinoffs: P.S. I Love You, Astrobrite
- Past members: Hobey Echlin; Odell Nails III; Mike Segal; David Stroughter
- Website: https://majestycrush.bandcamp.com/

Majesty Crush was an American indie rock band influenced by the shoegaze genre popularized in the UK in the late 1980s and early 1990s. Hailing from Detroit, Michigan, they formed in 1990 and broke up in 1995. The band's lineup consisted of lead singer David Stroughter (1966-2017), bassist Hobey Echlin, guitarist Michael Segal, and drummer Odell Nails III.

== History ==
Majesty Crush served as the opening act at shows in the early 1990s for such bands as Chapterhouse, Curve, Mazzy Star, Royal Trux, and The Verve. The band recorded a demo and released it locally as A Vintage Crushed by Your Own Feet in 1991. The band self-released the Fan EP the following year. The song "No. 1 Fan" from that EP picked up significant radio airplay on Windsor, Ontario's 89X, and led to Majesty Crush signing with Dali Records, a Warner/Elektra subsidiary at the end of 1992.

The band began recording their debut album in January 1993, later released as Love 15, on September 28, 1993. AllMusic's Joshua Glazer described the album as "a testament to what might have been, if only the band's four members lived in Manchester instead of Detroit."

The band planned to tour nationwide and possibly to England after the release of Love 15, but their momentum came to an abrupt halt when Dali folded within a month of the album's release. The band took their time to put out their next release, a self-released EP entitled Sans Muscles in 1994, its name being a reference to Echlin having left the band shortly after recording. A split with Spare Snare released on Ché Trading the following year. The band's final show was on September 10, 1995, and they quietly disbanded by the end of the year.

David Stroughter went on to form the band P.S. I Love You. Odell Nails later drummed for Robin Guthrie of Cocteau Twins, the similarly shimmery and ethereal bands Astrobrite and Mahogany, and the more garage indie-punk outfit Hunters.

In 1996, a Majesty Crush live performance was released as P.S. I Love You. About 50 of the first copies were credited to the group, but the rest of the copies were credited to P.S. I Love You.

In 2009, Full Effect Records released the compilation album I Love You in Other Cities: The Best of Majesty Crush 1990–1995. OC Weekly's Dave Segal remarked that the album "offers 14 reasons why we should still care about this footnote in shoegaze-rock history." AllMusic's Heather Phares called it "a good retrospective of a band that just may have been in the wrong place at the wrong time." Laura Witkowski of Metro Times said the album "feels like the work of a superfan, one keen to share his excitement for a band deserving of more attention than it received."

In 2017, Stroughter was killed by Los Angeles police officers after a slow-speed chase. The confrontation stemmed from two domestic incidents earlier in the day.

In 2020, Third Man Records chose "No. 1 Fan" as the lead-off track of its Southeast Of Saturn compilation, focusing on the best under-discovered early 90s ethereal and shoegaze bands from Detroit and its surrounding areas. In 2023, the surviving members entered into an exclusive license deal with the Numero Group, which would begin remastering and reissuing various tracks in preparation for Butterflies Don't Go Away, a compilation of their discography, released on March 29, 2024.

In 2025, Numero Group began releasing more Majesty Crush material not featured on Butterflies: a digital reissue of the Sans Muscles EP, two songs from the P.S. I Love You EP, and live tracks "Crushed" and "Party Girl", that was originally released on the demo cassette A Vintage Crushed by Your Own Feet and also appeared on I Love You In Other Cities, culminating in a full Live EP.

== Musical style and lyrical content ==
While incorporating the same lush, dreamy sound as other shoegaze acts of the time, the lyrics of Majesty Crush songs set them apart from other artists of the genre. Stroughter's often strange and obsessive lyrics cover such subjects as stalking Jodie Foster ("No. 1 Fan"), torture ("Boyfriend"), heroin ("Horse"), a female cashier at an adult book store ("Sunny Pie"), actresses ("Uma"), tennis stars ("Seles") and Italian porn stars ("Cicciolina"). The band's musical roots were focused on post-punk and new wave, specifically Joy Division and The Jesus and Mary Chain.

== Discography ==
=== Albums ===
- Love 15 (1993, Chameleon/Dali; 2023, Numero Group)

=== Compilation albums ===
- I Love You In Other Cities: The Best of Majesty Crush 1990-1995 (2009, Full Effect)
- Butterflies Don't Go Away (2024, Numero Group)

=== EPs and singles ===
- "Sunny Pie/Cicciolina" (1991, Vulva)
- A Vintage Crushed By Your Own Feet Demo EP (1991, Vulva)
- "Purr/Grow" (1992, Davies Productions)
- Fan EP (1992, Vulva)
- Sans Muscles EP (1994, Vulva)
- Split with Spare Snare (1995, Ché Trading)
- P.S. I Love You (1996, Vulva)
- "Boyfriend" (2023, Numero Group)
- "Cicciolina" (2023, Numero Group)
- "Horse" (2023, Numero Group)
- "Feigned Sleep" (2023, Numero Group)
- "Sunny Pie" (2023, Numero Group)
- "Worri" (2024, Numero Group)
- "No. 1 Fan (EP Version)" (2024, Numero Group)
- "Space Between Your Moles" (2024, Numero Group)
- "Gemini" (2025, Numero Group)
- "Everybody's Bored"/"Gemini" (2025, Numero Group)
- "Party Girl" (Live in 1991)" (2025, Numero Group)
- "Crushed" (Live in 1991)" (2025, Numero Group)
- Live EP (2025, Numero Group)
