= Butterflies Don't Go Away =

Compilation album by Majesty Crush
- Released: March 29, 2024
- Genres: Dream pop; indie rock
- Length: 93:18
- Label: Numero Group

Butterflies Don't Go Away is a compilation album by American indie rock band Majesty Crush, released by The Numero Group in 2024. It collects the band's sole album, Love 15, and various singles from throughout their discography.

== Background ==
Majesty Crush was together from 1990 to 1995. After the Chameleon record label, which released Love 15, shut down, the band received the master tapes for the album but was unable to sign with Elektra, who owned Chameleon. The band eventually lost their original bass player but forged on with the release of the Sans Muscles EP and a split single with Spare Snare before disbanding. In 2009, Full Effect Records released a compilation titled I Love You In Different Cities: The Best of Majesty Crush.

After the passing of former lead singer David Stroughter in 2017, conversations began to find the band's master tapes. She was able to send them over to Echlin. The first usage of the masters came in 2020, when Third Man Records featured "No. 1 Fan" from Love 15 as the leading track of Southeast of Saturn, a release compiling shoegaze and indie rock bands from the Michigan area.

In March 2023, the band began asking around for photos and videos for a "series of digital and physical releases" through an at-the-time undisclosed label. The label was shortly thereafter revealed to be Numero Group.

== Release and promotion ==
Professional ratings
Review scores
Source	Rating
Pitchfork	8.0/10
Mojo	3/5 stars

In anticipation of its release, Numero Group released several songs from the album as digital singles and advertised the compilation on their social media to raise interest in the release.

Pitchfork reviewer David Glickman gave the album a score of 8 and described it as "a melding of the unsavory and sweet, raw lust and desire amplified tenfold by tense basslines and waves of pillowy distortion."

Mojo reviewer Stevie Chick said that the compilation "showcases a band that were melodically complex".

== Track listing ==
No.	Title	Length
1.	"Boyfriend"	4:22
2.	"Uma"	3:07
3.	"No. 1 Fan"	3:45
4.	"Brand"	4:54
5.	"Purr" (Interlude)	1:08
6.	"Seles"	3:46
7.	"Grow"	3:52
8.	"Pretty Head" (Interlude)	0:55
9.	"Cicciolina"	4:00
10.	"Penny for Love"	3:20
11.	"Skin" (Interlude)	0:44
12.	"Feigned Sleep"	5:31
13.	"Horse"	6:48
14.	"No. 1 Fan" (EP version)	3:53
15.	"Worri"	4:55
16.	"Horse" (EP version)	5:33
17.	"Sunny Pie"	4:52
18.	"Cicciolina" (single version)	4:12
19.	"Purr" (Davies 7" version)	4:12
20.	"Space Between Your Moles"	4:37
21.	"Seine"	3:44
22.	"If JFA Were Still Together"	4:43
23.	"Ghost of Fun"	6:48
Total length:		1:33:18

- Tracks 1–13 originally appeared on Love 15 (1993, Dali/Chameleon)
- Tracks 14–17 originally appeared on Fan (1992, Vulva)
- Track 18 originally appeared on "Sunny Pie" b/w "Cicciolina" (1991, Vulva)
- Track 19 originally appeared on "Grow" b/w "Purr" (1992, Davies)
- Tracks 20–23 originally appeared on Sans Muscles (1994, Vulva)

== Personnel ==
Majesty Crush

- David Stroughter - vocals
- Michael Segal - guitar
- Hobey Echlin - bass
- Odell Nails - drums

Production

- Michael Graves - mastering
- David Feeny, Mike Clark, Tim Pak, The Nehra Brothers - engineering
- Carrie Kelly - photography
- Jana Gautschy - project manager
- Ken Shipley, Rob Sevier - reissue producer
- Judson Picco - editing
- Will Lovell - transcription
