= Pinkshinyultrablast =

- Origin: Saint Petersburg, Russia
- Genres: Shoegaze, dream pop
- Years active: 2007–present
- Labels: Shelflife Records

Pinkshinyultrablast is a Russian shoegaze band from Saint Petersburg.

== History ==
Their band name is a reference to the shoegaze band Astrobrite's 2005 album, Pinkshinyultrablast. The group's first output was a 2009 EP, Happy Songs for Happy Zombies, and several years passed before their next release, the single "Umi" in 2014. Their debut full-length, Everything Else Matters, arrived in 2015 and was marked by a variety of textures, described by The Guardian as including "shoegazing", "fiddly math-rock", and "wistful electronica". The follow-up Grandfeathered was issued in 2016. A third LP, Miserable Miracles, arrived in 2018.

In February 2022, the band posted an Instagram post demanding an end to the Russo-Ukrainian war. As of September 2025, this was their last and only remaining Instagram post.

== Members ==
Rustam Ismailov - Keyboards, synthesizers

Sergey - Drums

Roman Parinov - Guitar

Lyubov Soloveva - Vocals

== Discography ==
=== Albums ===
- Everything Else Matters (Shelflife/Club AC30, 2015)
- Grandfeathered (Shelflife/Club AC30, 2016)
- Miserable Miracles (Shelflife/Club AC30, 2018)

=== EPs ===
- Happy Songs for Happy Zombies EP (Odd Box Records, 2009)
- Songs (2020)

=== Singles ===
- Umi (2014)
- Holy Forest (2015)
- Ravestar Supreme (2015)
- Kiddy Pool Dreams (2015)
- The Cherry Pit (2016)
- In The Hanging Gardens (2018)

== See also ==
- Astrobrite
- Blankenberge
