= Camden Crawl =

Music festival in Camden, London, England

Camden Crawl was a music festival in Camden, London, which first appeared in 1995 and then was held annually from 2005 to 2014.

== Overview ==
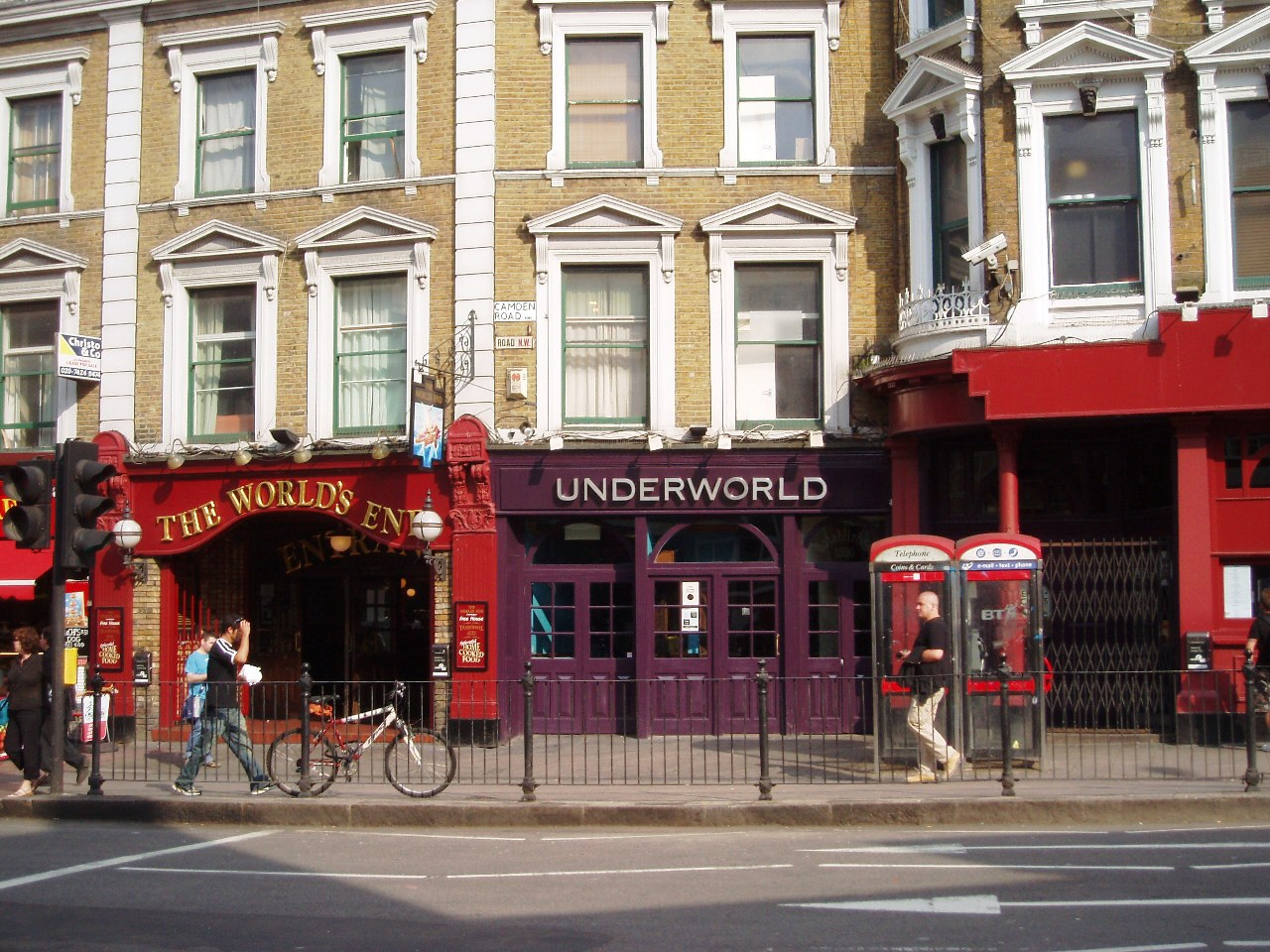
Underworld, one of the venues which hosted Camden Crawl performances in multiple years

Rather than a single venue, Camden Crawl operated at multiple venues simultaneously, with different acts taking the stage at different venues. This format is sometimes referred to as a "microfestival", a type of event which Time Out's Guide to London 2012 described as "a cross between a pub crawl and a music festival" and noted that Camden Crawl had originated. Drowned in Sound magazine called Camden Crawl "[u]ndoubtedly the first festival of its kind in the UK". Venues which hosted the events included The Barfly, Camden Underworld, Dingwalls, Dublin Castle, Electric Ballroom, KOKO, and Proud Gallery.

Unlike genre-specific music festivals, Camden Crawl booked acts from a wide variety of musical styles, including dubstep, folk, indie, new wave, pop, post-punk, punk, rock, shoegaze, and techno. Performers who have participated in Camden Crawl include Adele, Disclosure, Florence + the Machine, Mumford & Sons, and Amy Winehouse. In addition to bands and solo musicians, performers in some years included art historians, comedians, poets, and people with unusual skills such as hula hooping. In some years, the combination of popular musicians and tiny venues led to long lines, fan frustration and the nickname "Camden Queue".

== History ==
The festival was founded in 1995 by Lisa Paulon and four friends in the recording industry. She characterised the group as "five people who didn't know anything about putting on a gig" at the time the festival was first organised. They worked with "a group of journalists and Camden-based club promoters" to create the first event. Paulson later noted that health and safety regulations regarding decibel levels were unknown to the five founders initially, and conceded that 1995's performances were "a lot noisier than it is now [in 2011]". Some venues were also oversold, resulting in more ticket-holders wanting to see a performance than would fit in the venue where the act was performing.

Camden Crawl continued until 1997, when organisers decided that the event was "too much to manage for something we mostly did for a laugh". After resuming in 2005, Camden Crawl grew into a multi-arts festival. Chris Jakubiak was hired as event organiser and helped expand the festival, which went on to win "Best Metropolitan Festival" at the UK Festival Awards in 2009, 2010, and 2012.

=== 1995 ===
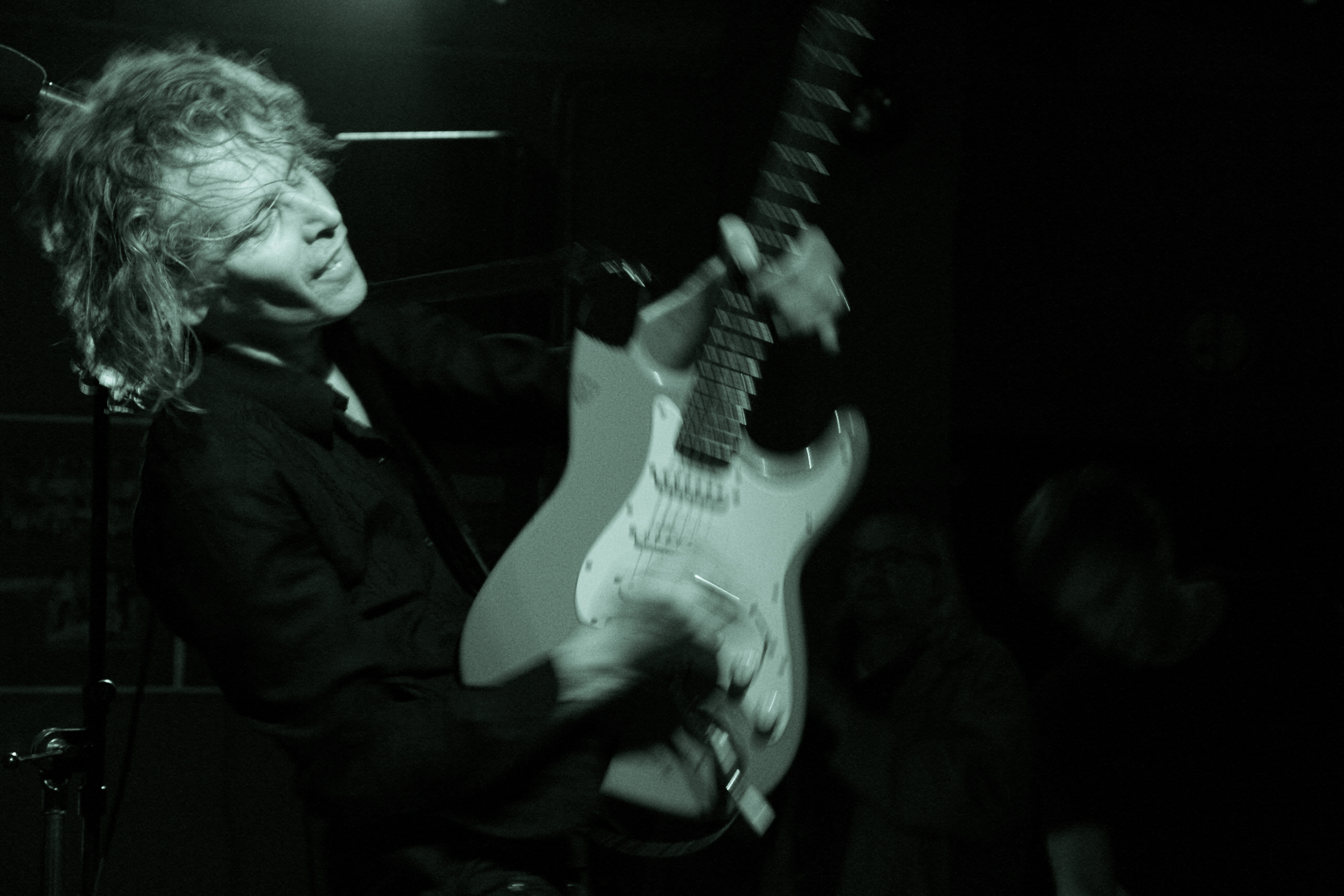
James Johnston of Gallon Drunk, who played at the first Camden Crawl and in subsequent years

Acts which played the first Camden Crawl included Bis, Blumfeld, Donkey, Gallon Drunk, Joeyfat, Kenickie, Killing Joke, The Lemonheads, Long Fin Killie, Nub, Penthouse, Pure Morning, Quickspace Supersport, Saint Etienne, Scarfo, Spare Snare, Bob Tilton, and The Wedding Present. The first year of the event spanned only five venues: Castlehaven Community Centre, Dingwalls, Dublin Castle, The Laurel Tree, and The Monarch (since renamed The Barfly).

=== 1996 ===
Performers at the second Camden Crawl, which was held on a Thursday night, 19 September, were predominantly from Scotland. Of twenty acts which participated, eight — AC Acoustics, Bis, The Delgados, Eska, Long Fin Killie, Mogwai, Prolapse, and Urusei Yatsura — were Glaswegian or had ties to Glasgow. The remainder of the lineup consisted of The Aloof, Gallon Drunk, Kenickie, Nub, Pure Morning, Quickspace Supersport, Scarfo, Spare Snare, Bob Tilton, and The Wedding Present.

=== 1997 ===
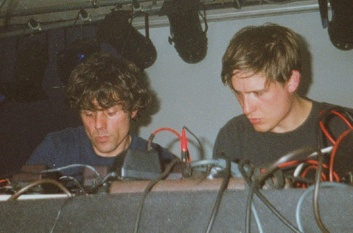
Mouse on Mars performed at Camden Crawl in 1997 and 2014.

In 1997, for the first time, Camden Crawl expanded to other cities. Again taking place in September, the festival began in Camden on 17 September (a Wednesday), moved to Manchester 18 September, and concluded in Glasgow on 19 September. As a result of the change in format, the festival was rebranded as "Intercity Crawl". Performers that year included Tanya Donelly, Echo & the Bunnymen (at the Electric Ballroom), Headrillaz (at Dingwalls), The High Fidelity (at the Camden Underworld), Mouse on Mars (at the Electric Ballroom), Navigator (at the Camden Underworld), Snow Patrol, The Third Eye Foundation (at The Monarch), Ultrasound, Velocette (at The Monarch), and The Wannadies. This year marked the last Camden Crawl until 2005.

The Glasgow lineup included Tanya Donelly (at King Tut's Wah Wah Hut), The Karelia (at Nice N Sleazy), Lo Fidelity Allstars (at King Tut's Wah Wah Hut), Magoo (at Nice N Sleazy), and Velocette (at The Cathouse).

=== 2005 ===
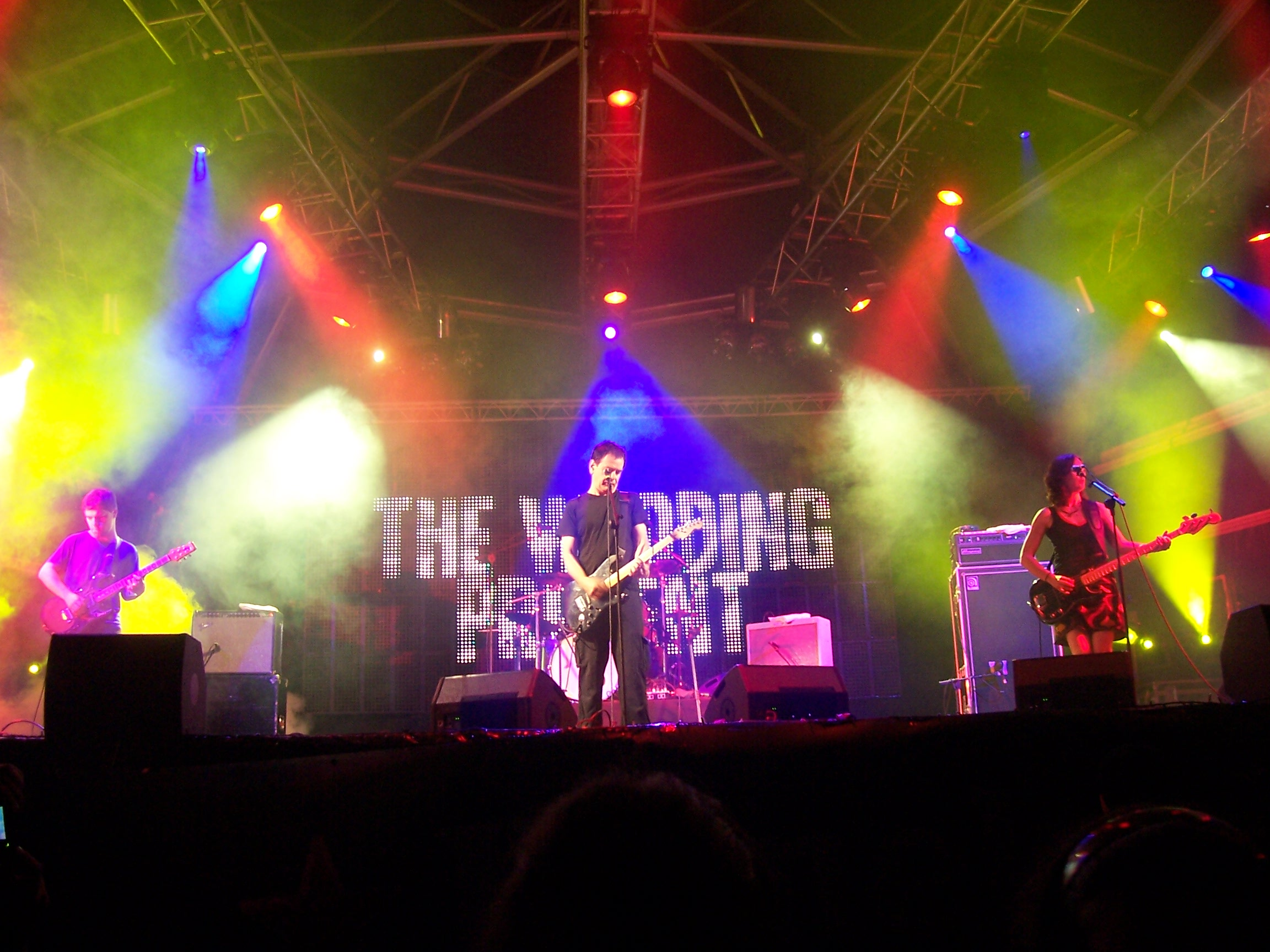
The Wedding Present also played Camden Crawl in multiple years.

To mark the tenth anniversary of the first Camden Crawl, organisers resurrected the festival, and the event took place 10 March, a Thursday, with forty acts playing. Performers in 2005 included Buzzcocks, Graham Coxon, The Cribs, Hard-Fi, Hope of the States, Hot Chip, The Kooks, Le Tigre, The Magic Numbers, Maxïmo Park, Mystery Jets, The Subways, and The Wedding Present. The nine participating venues were The Barfly, Camden Underworld, Canaervan Castle, Dublin Castle, Electric Ballroom, KOKO, Lock 17, Oh! Bar, and Purple Turtle. Festival partners who helped curate the selection of performers included Artrocker, Club Fandango, Last.fm, Moshi Moshi Records and the Rough Trade shops. Both lineup and attendance were greater than before the hiatus, and the festival sold out. As a result of the success of the tenth-anniversary Camden Crawl, organisers decided to resume holding the event annually.

=== 2006 ===
Performers at the 2006 Camden Crawl included ¡Forward, Russia!; Futureheads; Guillemots; Klaxons; Lethal Bizzle; Paolo Nutini; Plan B; Supergrass; Dogs, Captain and Sway. The event again sold out.

=== 2007 ===
The 2007 festival spanned two days, 19–20 April, a Thursday and Friday. Non-musical attractions were included in the schedule, such as stand-up comedy shows and quizzes. Amy Winehouse's appearance as one of Camden Crawl's performers drew both crowds and paparazzi. Hadouken! and dan le sac Vs Scroobius Pip made their Camden Crawl debuts. Adele also made an appearance — prior to her rise to fame — that year.

=== 2008 ===
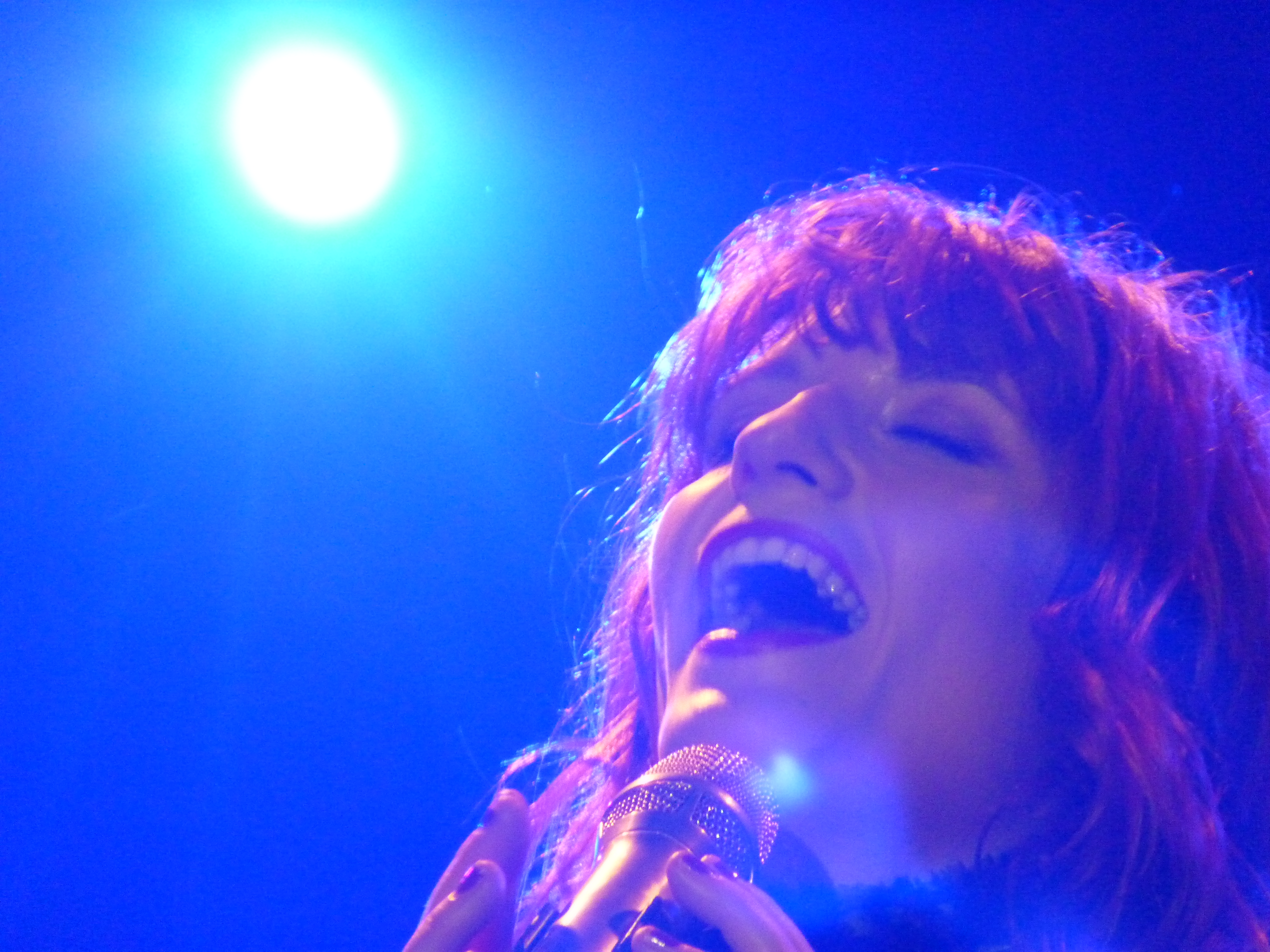
Lead singer Florence Welch of Florence + the Machine

Continuing the spring date selection for the festival, 2008's Camden Crawl took place over 18–19 April, an unseasonably warm weekend. Cage the Elephant performed at The Earl of Camden venue; Johnny Foreigner, M83, and Wild Beasts played The Flowerpot; and Lock 17 was another festival venue that year. Florence + the Machine also participated in the event for the first time. A total of 130 acts played at 25 venues during the 2008 festival. Other performers in 2008 included Crystal Castles, Hadouken!, Soko, Sam Sparro and White Lies.

=== 2009 ===
This was the year that Camden Crawl won "Best Metropolitan Festival" at the UK Festival Awards for the first time. It was also the first year the event had BBC Radio 6 Music as an official partner. Participating venues included Dublin Castle, the Enterprise, and, for the first time, Camden's historic Roundhouse theatre. Performers included 808 State, Billy Bragg, Echo & the Bunnymen, The Fall, Idlewild, Kasabian, The Maccabees, The xx, and Yeah Yeah Yeahs.

2009 also saw an alcohol-free event paralleling the Camden Crawl. Called the Red Bull Bedroom Jam X-Crawl, it took place at four venues and included performances by 25 alternative-music acts.

=== 2010 ===
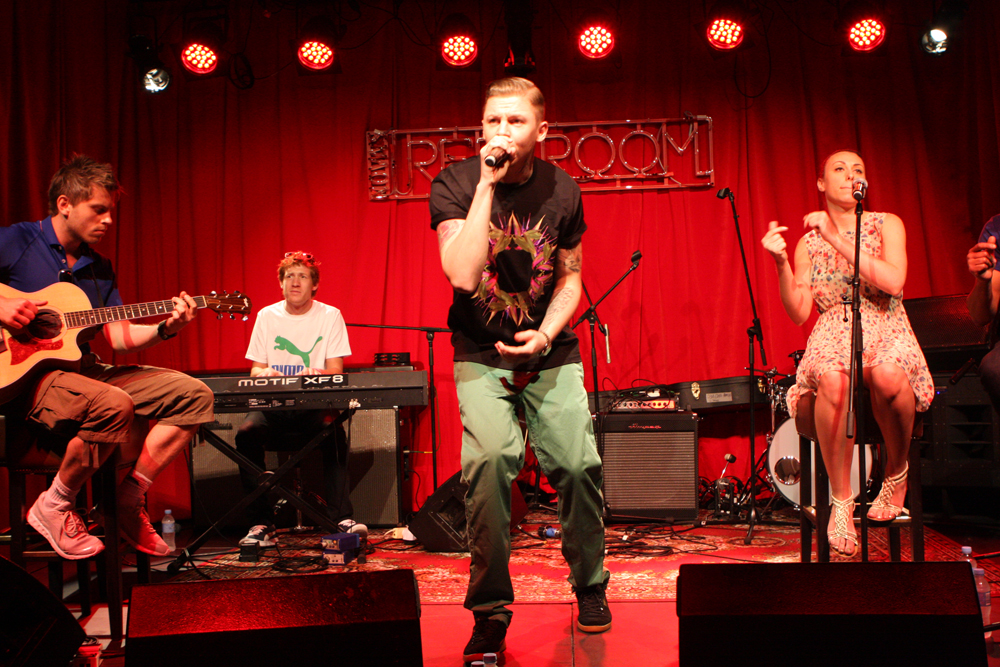
Professor Green

Camden Crawl won "Best Metropolitan Festival" at the UK Festival Awards for the second consecutive year in 2010. This was the first year there was rainy weather during the festival, which was scheduled to coincide with the UK Bank holiday. At the time of the event, participating performers Pendulum and Plan B had just released chart-topping albums, and participant Professor Green had a single at #1 as well. Teenage Fanclub performed at Camden Crawl for the first time that year. The choir group Gaggle also participated, singing at the Electric Ballroom.

=== 2011 ===
The festival spanned 29 April – 1 May, and featured performances by more than two hundred and fifty acts, including Hodgy Beats; Odd Future; and Tyler, The Creator. It attracted both a younger audience and attendees in middle age in 2011. The more than fifty venues that year included Dublin Castle, The Forum (actually in Kentish Town rather than Camden), The Jazz Cafe, Koko, and the Monarch.

=== 2012 ===
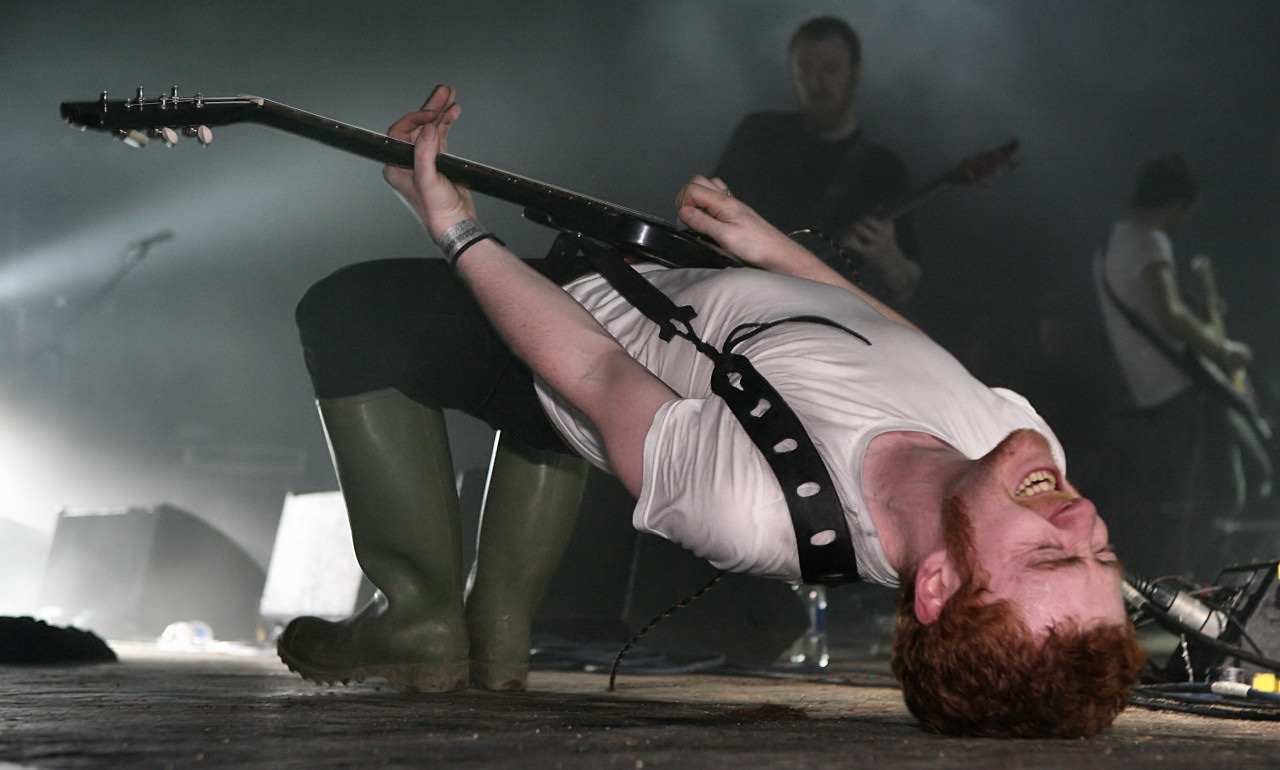
And So I Watch You from Afar performed in both Camden and Dublin.

This was the year that Camden Crawl won "Best Metropolitan Festival" at the UK Festival Awards for the third time. The festival took place at venues in Camden during the UK's Bank holiday weekend, 4–6 May, with scheduled performances which included Alabama 3, Gaz Coombes of Supergrass, Death in Vegas, Glasvegas, The Futureheads, and The Raincoats. Among the non-musical performances scheduled as part of the festival that year was a full day of presentations on art history. Other non-concert features at the 2012 Camden Crawl included alternative press, comedians, games, Hip Hop Shakespeare, KaraUke (karaoke combined with ukulele music), spoken word performers, and swing dancing.

In 2012, for the first time, Camden Crawl included a separate set of dates outside the UK — 11–12 May in Dublin, Ireland; Dublin performers included And So I Watch You from Afar, DELS, Le Galaxie, Jape, and We Are Scientists.

=== 2013 ===
The summer leg of the 2013 Camden Crawl took place not in Camden, but in Dublin; the festival returned to Camden venues for a winter leg in October.

=== 2014 ===
Spanning 20–21 June, more than twenty venues, and two hundred acts, 2014's Camden Crawl included performances by Atari Teenage Riot, Au Revoir Simone, Mouse on Mars, Of Montreal, School is Cool, Alexis Taylor of Hot Chip, and Thumpers.

== Financial difficulties ==
In July 2014, shortly after the end of that year's Camden Crawl, founder Paulon announced that the festival was "experiencing financial difficulty" and would be placed into voluntary liquidation as it was unable to pay all of its creditors. A statement on the festival website blamed low ticket sales for the shortfall.

== Significance ==
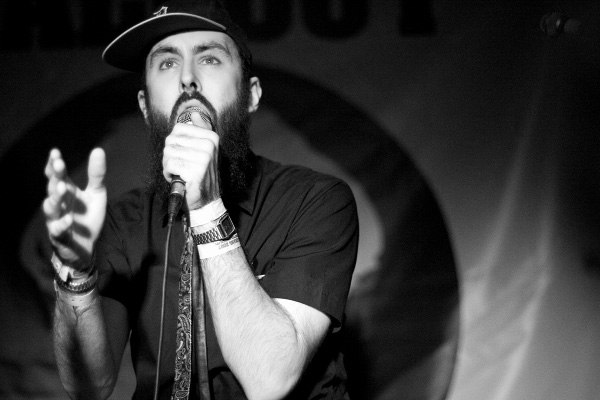
Scroobius Pip at the 2007 Camden Crawl

Stuart Clarke, an editor with Music Week, was quoted by BBC Radio 1 in 2008 as calling Camden Crawl "an important 'little stepping stone' for" up-and-coming musicians, and noting that performing at the festival was a good indicator that new acts would continue to become better-known. Yannis Philippakis — lead singer of the group Foals, which became successful after playing Camden Crawl when they had been relatively unknown — told BBC Radio 1 that "Camden Crawl is really important because bands get really great exposure. It's also a really great opportunity to play to music fans who may have heard of you but haven't had the chance to see you yet." Musicians from Hadouken! and dan le sac Vs Scroobius Pip agreed that performing at Camden Crawl had marked "a turning point" in their careers.
