= Astrobrite =

US musical group

- Genres: Shoegaze, noise pop
- Years active: 1993–1997, 2001–present
- Labels: Wavertone, Clairecords, Sonic Syrup, Musicmine, Vinyl Junkie, BLVD
- Members: Scott Cortez; Kelly Coffey; Ryan Davis
- Past members: Odell Nails; Melissa Arpin-Duimstra; Andrew Prinz; Sophie Brochu

Astrobrite (styled in lowercase letters) is an American shoegaze project by Scott Cortez (lovesliescrushing) which has included members of Mahogany (Andrew Prinz), Majesty Crush (Odell Nails), Paik, Darkred (Rob Smith), Xebec (Doug Walker), Coaltar of the Deepers (Narasaki), Airiel (Andrew Marrah), Fauvely (Sophie Brochu), Melissa Arpin-Duimstra, Jason Baron and many others. The current line up, since 2020, is (Kelly Coffey) and (Ryan Davis).

== Career ==
Astrobrite began in 1993 as a solo project and, in 1995, the band expanded in order to tour. Astrobrite went on an initial hiatus in 1997 and Scott Cortez moved to Toledo, Ohio for six months. Early in 1998, he relocated to Chicago.

In 2001, Astrobrite's first album Crush was released, composed of material from the 95-97 period. Adam Cooper (Alison's Halo) mastered and mixed Crush and 8 Candy EP.

Later in 2001, Scott Cortez flew to Tokyo, Japan to play the Seven Winters shoegaze festival. The trip fostered relationships with the Japanese shoegazer community and enabled a return to Japan to record a studio version of "Crush", entitled "Supercrush", the recording featured (Narasaki) of Coaltar of the Deepers, Melt Banana (Watchman), and (Tak) Dive.

In 2004 Astrobrite was signed to Vinyl Junkie Records in Japan and released "Pinkshinyultrablast".

From 2004 to 2008, in addition to recording Astrobrite material, Cortez was recording and performing with STAR.

On April 17, 2007, a new studio album Whitenoise Superstar (stylised as whitenoisesuperstar) was released under Vinyl Junkie. It was mastered by Narasaki and it features Japanese singer Yukari Tanaka (from Hartfield) in several tracks. Musically, the album adds some atmospheric drum and bass elements to its composition.

On August 27, 2008, Astrobrite released One Hit Wonder, a compilation album comprising previously unreleased songs and b-sides, with a more lo-fi recording.

2011 saw the vinyl reissue of Crush on BLVD records, this prompted Cortez to consider performing as Astrobrite again. Breaking another hiatus after nine years, Astrobrite played several live shows in the summer of 2012, including the Part time Punks Shoegaze fest in Los Angeles and the Beautiful Noise festival in 2013.

Boombox Supernova, was released on November 1, 2011, a compilation album of unreleased songs with ambient influences from 1994-1998.

Next year, on August 14, 2012, a studio album titled All The Stars Will Fall (stylised in all lowercase) was released. The third and last track, "Wandering Birds (Blind)" and "Till The Stars Fall From The Sky" respectively, feature vocals from Gel Set (Laura Callier) and from Japanese singer Linden (Purple Bloom).

In October 2014, Astrobrite became a three-piece group when Sophie Brochu (guitar, vocals), and Sarah Sterling (drums) joined the band.

In 2015, Deluxer was released by Vinyl Junkie and Astrobrite did a small tour of Japan in support of the release. The album features vocals from singer Sophie Nagelberg. Astrobrite dedicated the album to Danny Lackey.

In 2022, Astrobrite performed at Julia’s War Fest, marking a significant event as it featured the new line-up, Ryan Davis and Kelly Coffey; playing regularly in Chicago.

In 2024, Astrobrite was asked to play the Slide Away fest by the band Nothing.

== Discography ==
=== Albums ===
- Crush (2001, Clairecords)
- Supercrush (2002, Music Mine)
- Pinkshinyultrablast (2004, Vinyl Junkie)
- Whitenoise Superstar (2007, Vinyl Junkie)
- All the stars will fall (2012, Vinyl Junkie)
- Deluxer (2015, Vinyl Junkie)
- Suprema Demos (2015)

=== EPs ===
- Candy Swirl EP (1994)
- Cherryflavor EP (1995)
- Futuramic EP (1996)
- Smile EP (1997)
- Everything (1997)
- Sugar Blast (1999)
- 8 Candy EP (2001, Sonic Syrup)
- Noriko EP (2002)
- Starless (2012, EverythingIsChemical)

=== Singles ===
- Slowpoke/Overdriver (1996, Highback)
- Suckerpunch/Peach Fuzz (1996, Alacrity)
- Jingle Bells (2011)
- Her Beautiful Skin/My Forgotten Valentine (2011)
- I Am Endless Sky (2013)
- A Blasted Pink (2014)
- Heaven (2016)

=== Compilations ===
- One Hit Wonder (2008)
- Boombox Supernova (2011)
