= Bows (band) =

- Origin: United Kingdom
- Years active: 1999–2001
- Labels: Too Pure
- Past members: Luke Sutherland; Signe Høirup Wille-Jørgensen

Bows were a British-based band, who have released two albums on the Too Pure label.

== History ==
Following the dissolution of his former band Long Fin Killie, multi-instrumentalist Luke Sutherland formed Bows with the Danish singer Signe Høirup Wille-Jørgensen. Specializing in a kind of lush trip hop with grand arrangements, the band have met with some critical success.

The band's debut album, Blush, was released in 1999 to generally positive reviews.

Second album Cassidy followed in 2001.

== Discography ==
=== Albums ===
- Blush (1999), Too Pure
- Cassidy (2001), Too Pure

=== Singles, EPs ===
- "Blush" (1999), Too Pure
- "Britannica" (1999), Too Pure
- "Big Wings" (1999), Too Pure
- "Pink Puppet" (2001), Too Pure
