= Sounds Recorded by Steve Albini =

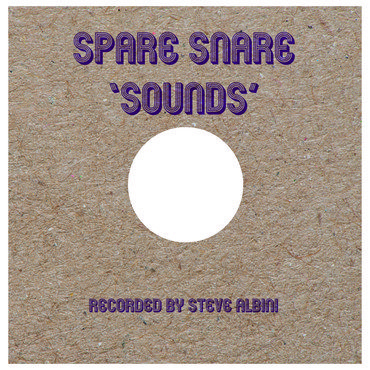

Studio album by Spare Snare
- Released: July 2018
- Recorded: February 2018
- Studio: Chem19, Blantyre, Scotland
- Genre: Lo-fi; alternative rock; indie rock
- Length: 33:51
- Label: Chute Records

Spare Snare chronology
Unicorn (2017)	Sounds Recorded by Steve Albini (2018)

Professional ratings
Review scores
Source	Rating
Uncut (magazine)	4/5 stars
The Skinny (magazine)	4/5 stars
The Scotsman	4/5 stars
God Is In The TV	9/10 stars
The Courier (Dundee)	8/10 stars
News Whistle	3/5 stars
Is this music?	4.5/5 stars

Sounds is the 13th album by Scottish lo-fi band Spare Snare, record and engineered by Steve Albini and released in 2018.

== Details ==
In February 2018, Spare Snare and Steve Albini presented an Audio Engineers' Workshop at Chem19 Studios in Blantyre, Scotland, after the workshop Spare Snare spent a further 4 days recording 10 songs from their back catalogue. The album and the workshop were both funded by Creative Scotland. It was recorded onto 2 inch tape at 15 inch per second and mixed down to half inch tape at 30 inch per second.

== Track listing ==
No.	Title	Writer(s)	Length
1.	"Action Hero"	Jan Burnett	2:59
2.	"I Am God"	Jan Burnett, Alan Cormack, Barry Gibson, Adam Lockhart and Graeme Ogston.	3:36
3.	"Super Slinky"	Jan Burnett	2:57
4.	"Hope You Never Go"	Jan Burnett, Alan Cormack, Barry Gibson, Adam Lockhart and Graeme Ogston.	3:05
5.	"Grow"	Jan Burnett, Alan Cormack, Barry Gibson and Graeme Ogston.	4:57
6.	"We Are The Snare" (Backing vocals by Emma Pollock)	Jan Burnett, Alan Cormack, Barry Gibson	2:40
7.	"Photograph Me Properly"	Jan Burnett, Alan Cormack, Barry Gibson and Graeme Ogston.	3:07
8.	"And Now It Is Over"	Jan Burnett, Alan Cormack, Barry Gibson, Adam Lockhart and Graeme Ogston.	3:11
9.	"Smile, It's Sugar"	Jan Burnett, Alan Cormack, Barry Gibson and Paul Esposito.	3:06
10.	"Bugs"	Jan Burnett.	4:13

== Personnel ==
=== Spare Snare ===
- Jan Burnett – vocals, guitar
- Alan Cormack – bass guitar, guitar, backing vocals
- Barry Gibson – drums, backing vocals
- Graeme Ogston – guitar, bass guitar, organ, backing vocals
- Adam Lockhart – guitar, bass guitar, synths, backing vocals

=== Additional personnel ===
- Fraser MacInness – Bagpipe drones on "Action Hero"
- Ali Hendry – Trumpet on "Action Hero" and "Grow"
- Dave Burnett – Electric slide guitar on "Grow"
- Emma Pollock – Backing vocals on 'We Are The Snare"
- Steve Albini - Recording and engineering
