= Blankenberge (band) =

Russian shoegaze band

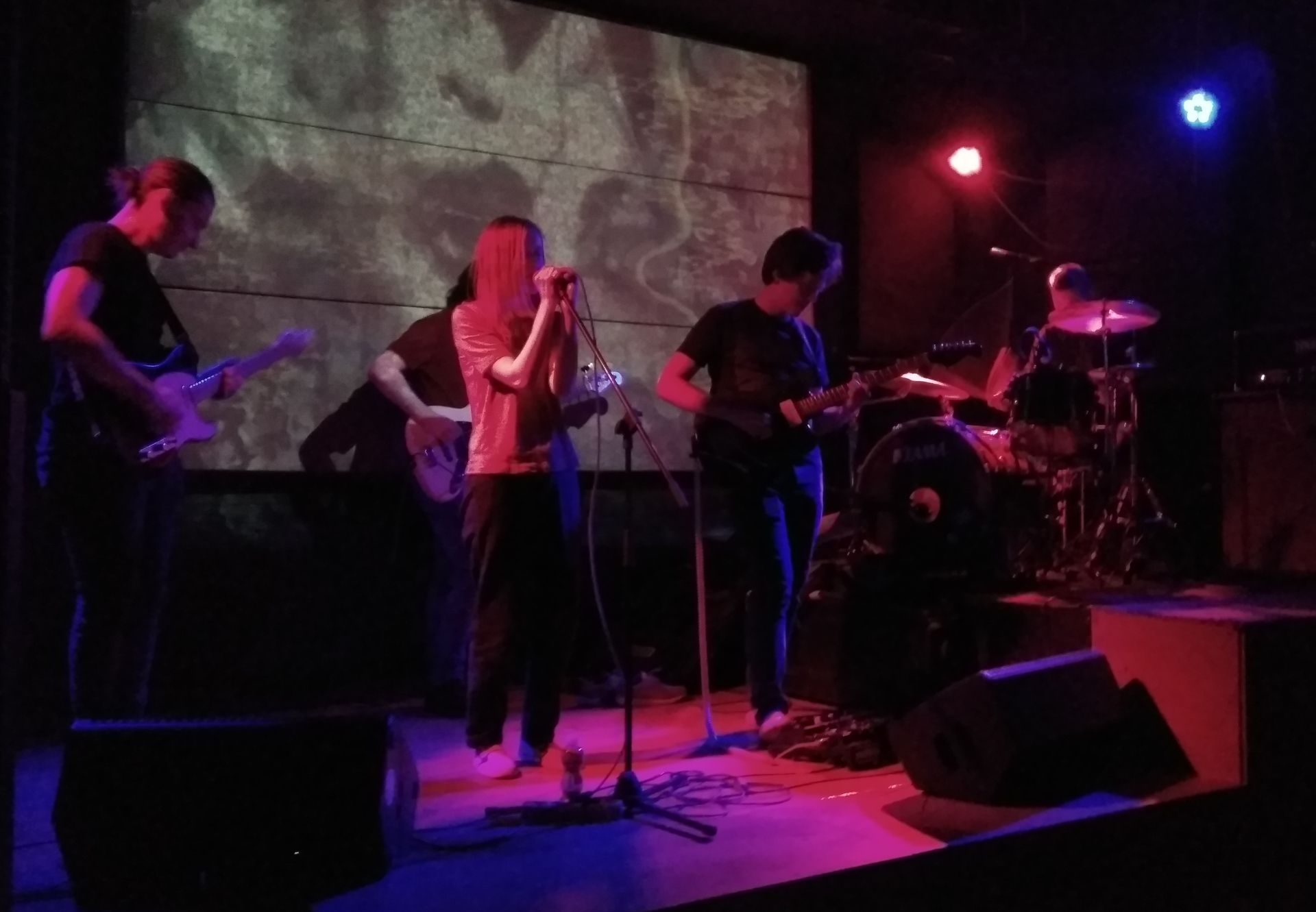
- Blankenberge playing in St Petersburg in 2017

Background information
- Origin: Barnaul, Siberia, Russia
- Genres: Shoegaze; post-rock; dream pop
- Years active: 2015–present
- Labels: Elusive Sound
- Members: Yana Guselnikova; Daniil Levshin; Dmitriy Marakov; Sergey Vorontsov
- Past members: Daian Aiziatov
- Website: www.blankenbergeband.com

Blankenberge is a Russian shoegaze band, featuring dream pop and post-rock elements in their music composition. Originally from Barnaul, Siberia, the band later moved to Saint Petersburg and dispersed across Europe following the 2022 Russian invasion of Ukraine. They now operate remotely.

== History ==
=== Origins ===
Blankenberge was formed in Barnaul, Siberia in 2015 by Yana Guselnikova (vocals) and Daniil Levshin (guitar, synth) after a trip throughout Europe. The band's name was chosen after the city Blankenberge in Belgium, which they visited on their trips. Yana and Daniil began to compose songs with their friends in Barnaul which would be part of their debut EP. They moved to Saint Petersburg and met members Daian Aiziatov (guitar), Dmitriy Marakov (bass) and Sergey Vorontsov (drums) to complete the lineup, though they knew each other before (except Sergey).

=== Career ===
The band released their self-titled EP Blankenberge on March 12, 2016. Later that year, they released their first single "Pictures of You" in August, a The Cure's cover. On June 30, 2017, Blankenberge released their debut studio album Radiogaze along with the single "We". They signed to record label Elusive Sound in July of that same year. They released their second studio album More on April 10, 2019, accompanied with the single "Right Now". Their third studio album Everything was released on November 14, 2021, with their fourth single "No Sense", becoming the first album without band member Daian.

In 2022, Levshin posted some messages on social media speaking against the Russian invasion of Ukraine. After receiving negative comments from some Russian fans, he and Guselnikova made the decision to move to Serbia. As of 2025 the pair remain there, whilst Marakov lives elsewhere in the EU and Vorontsov lives in Saint Petersburg.

The band released a new album, Decisions, in July 2025. The album consisted of a collection of songs recorded prior to the war, and was released on the Dutch label Automatic Music.

== Members ==
=== Current members ===
- Yana Guselnikova - vocals (2015–present)
- Daniil Levshin - guitar, synth (2015–present)
- Dmitriy Marakov - bass (2015–present)
- Sergey Vorontsov - drums (2015–present)

=== Past members ===
- Daian Aiziatov - guitar (2015–2019)

== Discography ==
=== Studio albums ===
- Radiogaze (2017)
- More (2019)
- Everything (2021)
- Decisions (2025)

=== EPs ===
- Blankenberge (2016)

=== Singles ===
- "Pictures of You" (2016)
- "We" (2017)
- "Right Now" (2019)
- "No Sense" (2021)
- "New Rules" (2024)
- "Together" (2025)
- "Escape" (2025)

== See also ==
- Pinkshinyultrablast
