= Luke Sutherland =

Musician and writer

Luke Sutherland (born 1971) is a Scottish musician, producer, and writer. He has played with bands such as Mogwai and Long Fin Killie, and has written books including Venus as a Boy.

== Biography ==
Born in London, Sutherland grew up in Orkney and the town of Blairgowrie in Perthshire. While he was at the University of Glasgow, he and others formed the Scottish post-rock band Long Fin Killie, who were active from 1993 until 1998. The band recorded three albums for the independent label Too Pure: Houdini (1995), Valentino (1996) and Amelia (1998). He then formed Bows, the band releasing two albums. Since 2000, he has been an occasional and touring member of Mogwai, playing violin and more recently guitar. He also sings on and has a writing credit for the track "Mexican Grand Prix". He also sings with a band called Music A.M. with Stefan Schneider and Volker Bertelmann, releasing three albums: A Heart & Two Stars (2004), My City Glittered Like a Breaking Wave (2005) and Unwound From The Wood (2006). Sutherland formed the band Rev Magnetic in 2018.

Sutherland's debut novel, Jelly Roll, was nominated for the Whitbread Prize in the first novel category in 1998. His novella Venus As A Boy (2004) talks extensively about Sutherland's own childhood in Orkney, where he and his sister were the sole African children.

== Bibliography ==
- Jelly Roll, Anchor (1998)
- Sweetmeat, Anchor (2002)
- Venus as a Boy, Bloomsbury (2004)
