= Venus as a Boy (novella) =

2004 novella by Luke Sutherland

- First edition
- Author: Luke Sutherland
- Language: English
- Genre: Novella
- Publisher: Bloomsbury Publishing
- Publication date: April 2004; 22 years ago
- Publication place: United Kingdom
- Media type: Print (Paperback)
- ISBN: 0-7475-6905-3
- OCLC: 57282918

Venus as a Boy is a 2004 fiction novella by Scottish writer and musician Luke Sutherland, his third publication following two earlier novels, Jelly Roll (1998) and Sweetmeat (2002).

It is set briefly in South Ronaldsay, Orkney, an island off the coast of Scotland though it is largely set in Soho, London. The author purports to tell the posthumous story of Désirée, who apparently was a clandestine peer of his growing up in South Ronaldsay. Désirée's audio-recorded memoirs presented to the novel's author by Désirée's friend and confidant Pascal serve as the narrative throughout majority of the story.

The novella draws on Sutherland's own childhood in the Orkney Islands. Sutherland and his sister were the only Scots-Africans on South Ronaldsay, having been adopted by white parents.

== See also ==
- Venus as a Boy Björk's song
- Venus as a Boy 2021 film
