= Auburn Lull =

- Origin: Lansing, Michigan, U.S.
- Genres: Ambient, dream pop, shoegaze, ethereal wave, space rock, post-rock
- Years active: 1994–present
- Labels: Burnt Hair, Darla
- Members: Sean Heenan; Jason Kolb; Jason Weisinger; Eli Wekenmen; Ron Gibbs
- Website: Auburn Lull

Auburn Lull is an American five-piece dream pop band from Lansing, Michigan, United States, which formed in 1994.

== Biography ==
The band was founded in 1994 by guitarist/vocalist Sean Heenan, guitarists Jason Kolb and Eli Wekenman, and drummer Jason Wiesinger. The group's influences include Seefeel, Flying Saucer Attack, and earlier works from OMD, along with many of the acts on the 4AD and Creation Records imprints. They later added bassist/guitarist Ron Gibbs.

In 1997, the Dearborn, Michigan label Burnt Hair Records released the Dual Group EP — a split recording with Auburn Lull and Mahogany. Auburn Lull's full-length debut, Alone I Admire, initially released on Burnt Hair in 1999, was later reissued by Darla Records in 2002. Belgian label Zeal Records released a limited-edition 2001 7" single, "Behind All Curses of Thought Lies the Ability to Focus on Vacant Spaces". Auburn Lull's second album, Cast from the Platform, was released in 2004. A rarities compilation, Regions Less Parallel, was issued in 2005, followed by their third album, Begin Civil Twilight, in 2008. The band released their fourth album, Hypha, on September 15, 2017, on the Azure Vista label.

== Discography ==
=== Studio albums ===
- Alone I Admire (1999, Burnt Hair; 2002, Darla)
- Cast from the Platform (2004, Darla)
- Begin Civil Twilight (2008, Darla)
- Hypha (2017, Azure Vista)

=== EPs ===
- Dual Group split with Mahogany (1997, Burnt Hair)
- Hiber (2014, Geographic North)

=== Compilation albums ===
- Regions Less Parallel: Early Works and Rarities 1996–2004 (2005, Darla)
