= Space rock =

Genre of rock music

- Stylistic origins: Psychedelia; progressive rock; psychedelic rock; acid rock; space music
- Cultural origins: Late 1960s and early 1970s, United Kingdom
- Derivative forms: Post-rock; shoegaze

Subgenres
- Space rock revival

Other topics
- Alternative rock; ambient music; experimental rock; indie rock; krautrock; minimal music; noise pop

Space rock is a music genre characterized by loose and lengthy song structures centered on instrumental textures that typically produce a hypnotic, otherworldly sound. It may feature distorted and reverberation-laden guitars, minimal drumming, languid vocals, synthesizers, and lyrical themes of outer space, aliens and science fiction.

The genre emerged in late 1960s psychedelia and progressive rock bands such as Pink Floyd, Hawkwind, and Gong who explored a "cosmic" sound. Similar sounds were pursued in the early 1970s West German kosmische Musik ("cosmic music") scene. By the 1980s and 1990s, the "drone-heavy" sound of Spacemen 3 spearheaded a revival of the genre, which later influenced shoegaze and post-rock.

== History ==
=== Origins: 1950s–1960s ===
Humanity's entry into outer space provided ample subject matter for rock and roll and R&B songs from the mid-1950s through the early 1960s. It also inspired new sounds and sound effects to be used in the music itself. A prominent early example of space rock is the 1959 concept album I Hear a New World by British producer and songwriter Joe Meek. The album was inspired by the space race and concerned humanity's first close encounter with alien life forms. Meek then went on to have a UK and US No 1 success in 1961 with "Telstar", named after the newly launched communications satellite and thus intended to commemorate the new space age. Its main instrument was a clavioline, an electronic forerunner of the synthesizers.

Pink Floyd in 1967. From left: Nick Mason, Richard Wright, Roger Waters, Syd Barrett

Pink Floyd's early albums contain pioneering examples of space rock: "Astronomy Domine", "Pow R. Toc H." and "Interstellar Overdrive" from their 1967 debut album The Piper at the Gates of Dawn are examples, with free-form improvisations from lead guitarist and then-bandleader Syd Barrett. Their second album A Saucerful of Secrets contained further examples: "Let There Be More Light" and "Set the Controls for the Heart of the Sun" with explicit science fiction themes, and their third, More (1969), had "Cirrus Minor".

Jimi Hendrix is also an early innovator of the genre, with such tracks as "Third Stone from the Sun", "1983... (A Merman I Should Turn to Be)" and "The Stars That Play with Laughing Sam's Dice".

=== Peak: 1970s–1980s ===
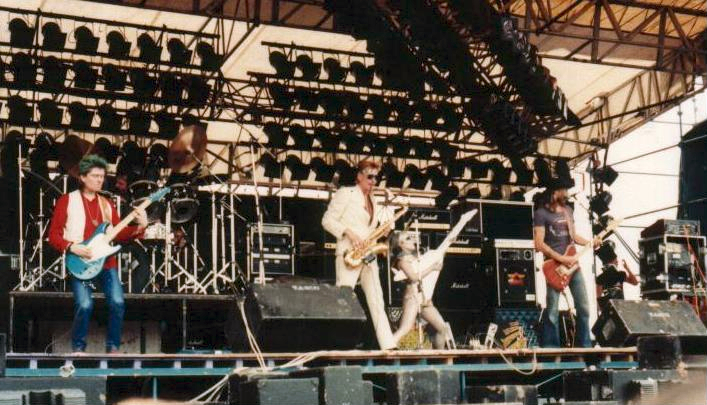
Hawkwind, an influential space rock band

In the early 1970s, West Germany's kosmische Musik ("cosmic music") scene developed among artists who explored "spacy", ambient instrumental soundscapes. The term is frequently used as a synonym of krautrock, but may also be used as a German analogue to the English term "space rock". These artists often explored electronic music, synthesizers, and themes related to space or otherworldliness. Examples included artists like Ash Ra Tempel, Tangerine Dream, Popol Vuh, and Klaus Schulze.

In early 1971, Pink Floyd began writing the song that would become known as "Echoes", from the 1971 album Meddle. The song was performed from April until September 1971, with an alternative set of lyrics, written about two planets meeting in space.

A major album in the history of space rock was Hawkwind's Space Ritual (1973), a two-disc live album advertised as "88 minutes of brain-damage" documenting Hawkwind's 1972 tour that included a liquid light show and lasers, nude dancers (notably the earth-mother figure Stacia), wild costumes and psychedelic imagery. This hard-edged concert experience attracted a motley but dedicated collection of psychedelic drug users, science-fiction fans and motorcycle riders. The science fiction author Michael Moorcock collaborated with Hawkwind on many occasions and wrote the lyrics for many of the spoken-word sections on Space Ritual.

In Europe, Hungarian band Omega produced albums such as Time Robber (1976), Skyrover (1978), and Gammapolis (1979). Other European bands include the progressive rock groups Eloy and Nektar. Nektar, who were known for having a rhythmic liquid/slide light show at their concerts, released their album Journey to the Centre of the Eye in 1971. Another European band of the period were the French Rockets, formed in 1974 and relocated to Italy in 1978.

=== Late 1980s–2000s: Space rock revival ===
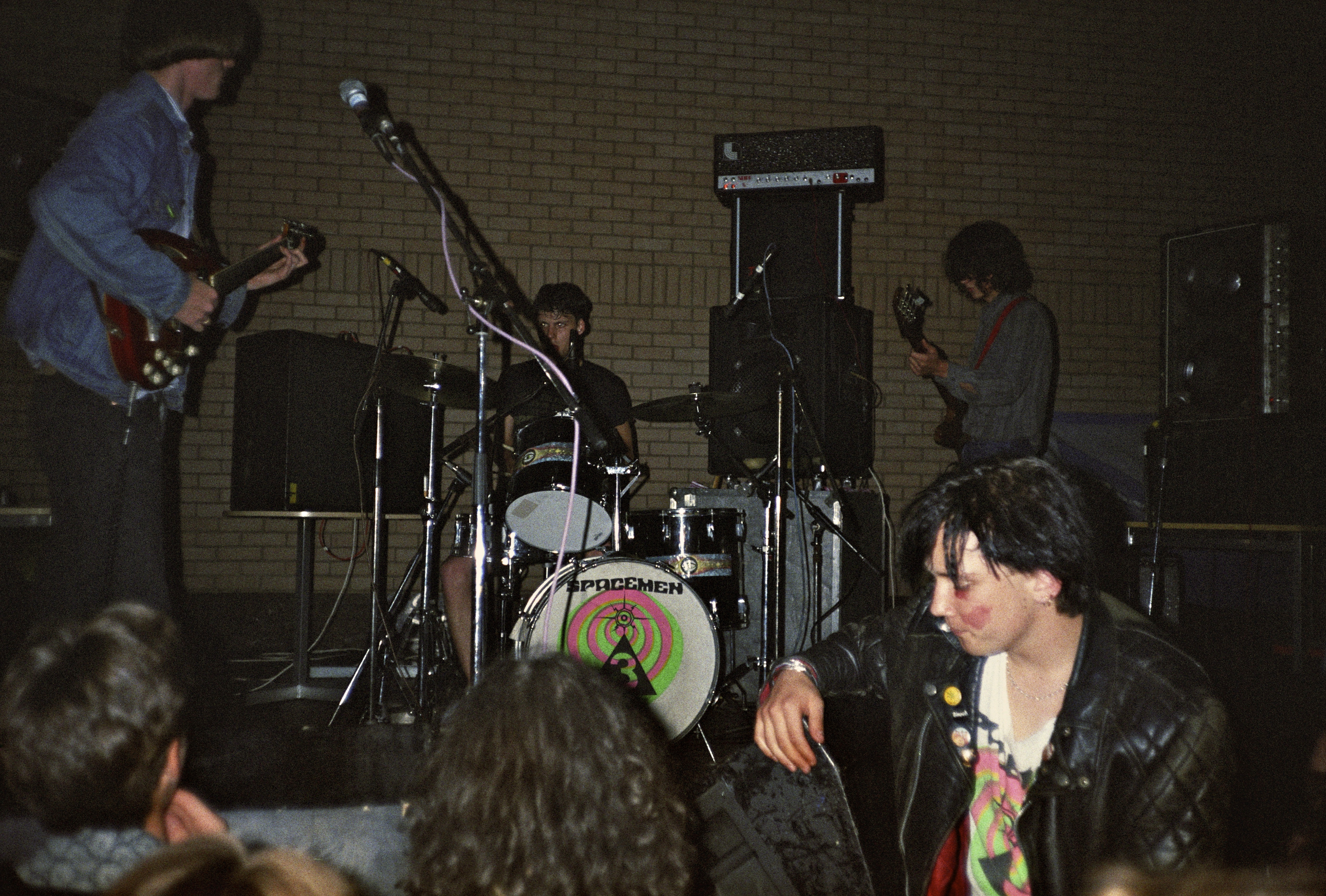
British group Spacemen 3 spearheaded the space rock revival.

The late 1980s and early 1990s space rock revival extended from shoegaze, dream pop, and related indie genres, as well as the first wave of post-rock. In the United Kingdom and the United States, it included bands such as Spacemen 3, Spectrum, Spiritualized, the Verve, My Bloody Valentine, Flying Saucer Attack, Failure, Duster, Magic Mushroom Band, and Ozric Tentacles.

In the mid-1990s, a number of bands built on the space rock styles of Hawkwind and Gong appeared in America. Some of these bands were signed to Cleopatra Records, which then proceeded to release numerous space rock compilations. Starting in 1997, Daevid Allen of Gong, along with members of Hawkwind, Clearlight, and Blue Öyster Cult, started to perform with Spirits Burning, a studio project created to celebrate space rock.

The Strange Daze festivals from 1997 to 2001 showcased the American space rock scene in three-day outdoor festivals. A Michigan-based space rock scene included Burnt Hair Records, Darla Records, and bands such as Windy & Carl, Mahogany, Sweet Trip, Füxa, and Auburn Lull. This was a modern movement of the traditional "space rock" sound and was pinned Detroit Space Rock.

== See also ==
- Space-themed music
- Space music
- Space disco
- Space age pop
- Space Truckin'
