= Flowchart (band) =

American musical group

- Also known as: Flowtron
- Origin: Philadelphia
- Years active: 1994–2003
- Labels: Fuzzy Box; Darla; Carrot Top; Endorphin; Burnt Hair
- Past members: Craig Bottel; Brodie Budd; Sean O'Neal; Erin Anderson

Flowchart was an American band from Philadelphia. The group originally consisted of Sean O'Neal, Craig Bottel, and Brodie Budd in 1994. Their first album, Multi-Personality Tabletop Vacation, was released in 1995 on Carrot Top Records, and followed the album with several EPs and projects.

In 1997, O'Neal met Erin Anderson at a DJ gig. This meeting led to the duo collaborating on music and eventually having Anderson join Flowchart while Bottel and Budd left the group. Their second album, Cumulus Mood Twang, received positive reviews from Allmusic, Pitchfork Media, and CMJ, as well as having the group placed on URB's "Next 100" list. The following releases from Flowchart included Commercial in 1999 and Broken and Blue in 2003, where the group began to have more of an experimental techno and house music sound. They later released their third album, Wishworm Tracks.

Both O'Neal and Anderson began recording their own music in the 2000s, with O'Neil recording under the name Someone Else and Anderson releasing albums as Fidget, as well as working at a hair salon that doubled as an art gallery.

== History ==
Flowchart's earliest release was on Sean O'Neal's label Fuzzybox Records, where the group released their first single, titled "Our Little Audio 7-Inch", in 1994. The band released an EP in 1995 titled Hallow Sky on Burnt Hair Records. Their first studio album, Multi-Personality Tabletop Vacation, was released the same year, on Carrot Top Records. The record was criticized for being too similar to the group Stereolab by online music database Allmusic and the Philadelphia City Paper. Allmusic's review stated that "some of the songs on Multi-Personality Tabletop Vacation seem liks [sic] perfect replicas of Space Age Bachelor Pad or Mars Audiac Quintet-era Lab. And don't think it's accidental; one of the songs on the album is actually called "New Radiolab Rip-Off." The group found the comparison odd, stating that they had not heard a lot of Stereolab music at that point.

In 1996, Flowchart released the Evergreen Noise Is Flexible EP through Carrot Top on August 6 and Tenjira on November 12. Tenjira marked a turning point for the group's style, and a review from Allmusic described it as "Flowchart managed to leave behind their Stereolab fixation and move on to simply sounding Japanese."

In January 1997, Sean O'Neal met Erin Anderson at a DJing gig where the two discussed music. O'Neal recalled meeting Anderson, stating that, "Basically, we were fascinated with each other because we were both overwhelmed to meet someone who had exactly the same taste in music". A few weeks after meeting, the two began working on music together and a few months later began dating.

Brodie Budd and Craig Bottel left the group while Anderson became a member. Flowchart released the album Cumulus Mood Twang on October 20, 1997. It received positive reviews from Allmusic, Pitchfork Media, and CMJ magazine. After a tour of Europe, the group began working on their next album. In 1998, Flowchart were listed on URB's "Next 100", a list of promising up-and-coming musicians.

The group's next album, titled Commercial, was a collaboration with Trevor Kampmann under the alias hollAnd. It was released on January 13, 1999. The sound of the album was described as containing "drum'n'bass moves, C-86 pop references, and even a few orchestrated 60s-pop touches" Flowchart's sound continued to change as they released their Gee Bee EP in 2000, which was more experimental-techno sounding. Their next release, titled Broken and Blue, in 2003, contained a more house music-oriented sound.

=== Post-Flowchart ===
O'Neal has since recorded music under the name Someone Else, releasing the album Pen Caps and Colored Pencils in 2007. Anderson has released albums under the name Fidget for Foundsound Records since 2006. In 2008, Anderson opened Fringe Salon, a hair salon on East Passyunk Avenue in South Philadelphia. Fringe doubles as an art gallery and music club in the evenings. O'Neil went on to create Little Helpers Records with Andrew Rasse in December 2009, based out of New Jersey.

== Discography ==
- Multi-Personality Tabletop Vacation (1995)
- Tenjira (1996)
- Cumulus Mood Twang (1997)
- Commercial (1999)
- Wishworm Tracks (2001)
- Evergreen Noise Is Flexible / The Spirit of Kenny G (2003)
- Pre-2000 Singles and Comp Tracks, Part One (2003)
- Pre-2000 Singles and Comp Tracks, Part Two (2003)
- Post-2000 Getup (2015)
