= Alison's Halo =

Musical group in Tempe, Arizona

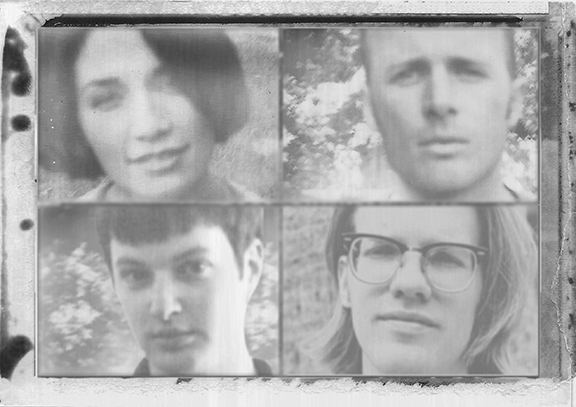

Background information
- Origin: Tempe, Arizona
- Genres: Dream pop, shoegaze
- Years active: 1992–1998, 2009–present
- Labels: Independent Project Records, Burnt Hair Records, Manufactured Recordings, Eyedazzler Records
- Members: Catherine Cooper; Adam Cooper; Roger Brogan
- Past members: Lynn Anderson; Thomas Lanser; Scott Macdonald; David Rogers
- Website: Official site

Alison's Halo is a band from Tempe, Arizona. Their sound, distinguished by dreamy vocals and loud, spacey guitars, is often associated with shoegaze and dream pop. The band's music employs noise. AllMusic described the sound as "loud and blissful", and categorized it as both space age pop and "ethereal, guitar-heavy space rock". The band's influences include My Bloody Valentine, Ride, the Verve and Slowdive.

== History ==
Alison's Halo formed in Tempe, Arizona, in October 1992. The original lineup included vocalist/guitarist Catherine Cooper, guitarist Adam Cooper and bassist Lynn Anderson; they dubbed their Alesis SR-16 drum machine "Alison". Their debut gig was at an old Odd Fellows hall with Jimmy Eat World opening. The band quickly obtained opening slots for international touring acts like Ultra Vivid Scene, Curve, the Verve, the Boo Radleys, Bailter Space, and Stereophonics, performed at several music festivals (including CMJ Music Marathon and South by Southwest) and recorded two demo cassettes, Slug and Halo. They added drummer Thomas Lanser prior to recording their debut single, "Dozen", released in early 1995 on Independent Project Records. The lineup changed again, with bassist David Rogers (also of Half String) and drummer Roger Brogan replacing Anderson and Lanser. During 1997, the band added Scott McDonald (formerly of Closedown) as a third guitarist.

Their first album, Eyedazzler 1992–1996, a CD compilation of songs the band created between 1992 and 1996, was released in 1998 on Burnt Hair Records.

After the dissolution of Alison's Halo in the late 1990s, Adam and Catherine Cooper relocated to Chicago and recorded Burt Bacharach-influenced pop at their home Jetpack Studios under a variety of band names. As the Pastry Heros, they self-released the five-song Horn Rim Fury CD EP in 1998 on their own Submersible Recordings. As Kitten Factor, they released the "Nite Lite" single on the Rainbow Quartz International label in 1998, and the three-song "Surround" 7-inch EP in 1999 on Sunday Records. In 1999, they changed names again to Insta, re-releasing Horn Rim Fury under that name on Sunday Records. Insta released a full-length album, Checklist for Love, in 2002 on Sunday.

Adam Cooper also records as the solo ambient guitar project Signals Into Space.

In 2009, the Coopers reactivated Alison's Halo and released several digital compilations of old material via their website, including three live albums and the Jetpacks for Julian demos EP.

The Alison's Halo song "Dozen" was included on the Still in a Dream: A Story of Shoegaze 1988–1995 box set compilation, released January 29, 2016, by Cherry Red Records.

On April 13, 2016, the band self-released a digital single, "Some Heaven"/"The Hardest Part", both tracks being Eyedazzler-era demos from the 1990s.

An expanded reissue of Eyedazzler finally materialized in 2017, released by Manufactured Recordings in CD, vinyl and digital formats as part of that label's The Shoegaze Archives reissue project. It included remastered tracks from Eyedazzler 1992–1996, both sides of the "Dozen" single and three unreleased demos from the Eyedazzler sessions. Three videos were released to coincide with the reissue: "Dozen" (which debuted on The Big Takeover), "Slowbleed" and "Sunshy".

== Discography ==
=== Singles and EPs ===
- Slug cassette EP (1993, self-released)
- Halo cassette EP (1994, self-released)
- "Dozen" 7-inch single (1995, Independent Project Records)
- Jetpacks for Julian digital EP (2009, self-released)
- "Some Heaven"/"The Hardest Part" digital single (2016, self-released)
- "Happy" digital single (Dec 2024, Eyedazzler Records)
- "So Far Away" digital single (May 2025, Eyedazzler Records)
- "Skywide" digital EP (Oct 2025, self-released)

=== Compilation albums ===
- Eyedazzler 1992–1996 (1998, Burnt Hair Records)
- Eyedazzler (2017, Manufactured Recordings)

=== Live albums ===
- Live at the 1995 All Fish Go to Heaven Festival: Hollywood Alley – Mesa Arizona digital album (2009, self-released)
- Live at the 1995 Beautiful Noise Festival: Downtown Performance Center – Tucson Arizona digital album (2009, self-released)
- Live at the 1995 Beautiful Noise Festival: Rancho De Los Muertos – Phoenix Arizona digital album (2009, self-released)

=== Compilation appearances ===
- "Dozen" on Still in a Dream: A Story of Shoegaze 1988–1995 (2016, Cherry Red)
- "Chalkboard James" on Terra X Vol. 1 Love And Hate (1993, Terra X Records)
