= Lovesliescrushing =

American musical duo

lovesliescrushing
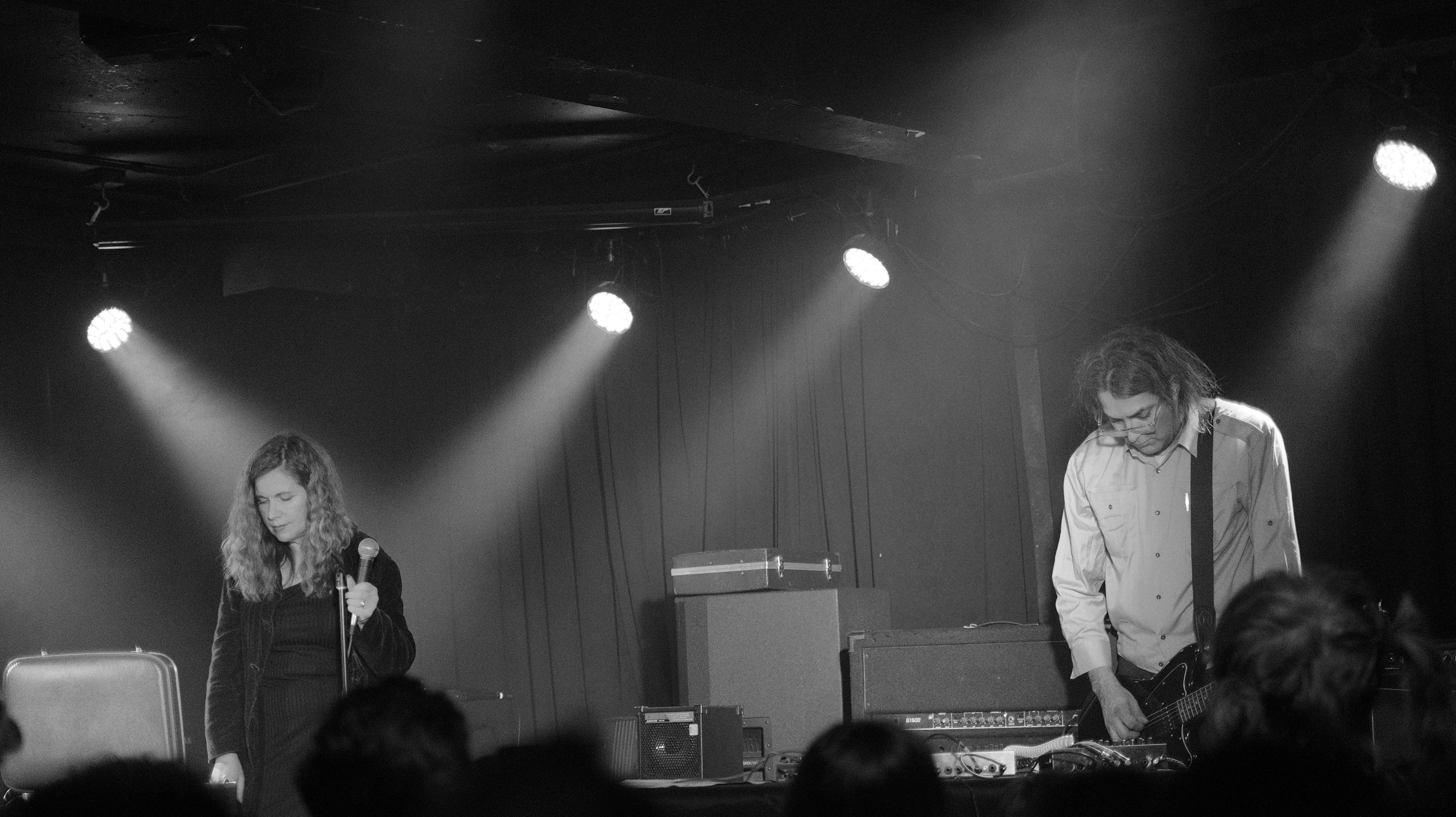
- Lovesliescrushing at the Empty Bottle in Chicago on January 26, 2024

Background information
- Origin: East Lansing, Michigan, U.S.
- Genres: Shoegaze; ambient; post-rock; psychedelia; dream pop
- Instruments: Guitar, voice, loops, effects
- Years active: 1991–present
- Labels: Lullaby, Projekt Records, Sonic Syrup, Automatic Entertainment, LINE, Handmade Birds, Thisquietarmy, wavertone, The Numero Group
- Members: Scott Cortez; Melissa Arpin-Duimstra

Lovesliescrushing (stylized in lowercase as lovesliescrushing) is an American musical duo from East Lansing, Michigan, United States, formed in 1991. The two primary members of the band are Scott Cortez, who variously contributes guitars, loops and effects, and Melissa Arpin-Duimstra, who is the duo's vocalist. They are known for their dense and surreal psychedelic music drawing from shoegaze and dream pop, with unorthodox instrumentation and little to no drums.

Several guest musicians have joined the group for live performances over the duration of its career, including Michael Anderson (Turn Pale, Drekka), Ana Breton (Dead Leaf Echo, Mahogany), Andy Schiaffino (body / negative), Anastasia Gladkova (GS70), Emilie Jaeger, Alyssa Browne and Andrew Prinz (Mahogany).

== History ==
=== Formation and early career ===
Cortez and Arpin-Duimstra formed Lovesliescrushing in 1991 in East Lansing and later moved to Tucson, Arizona. In 1992, the duo issued the Bloweyelashwish cassette LP on their own Lullaby label, featuring different mixes of the songs from their debut album, similarly titled Bloweyelashwish

Lovesliescrushing signed a record deal with Projekt Records, who issued their debut album on CD and cassette in 1994, along with the "Youreyesimmaculate" single. Ned Raggett of AllMusic later described the album as "an amazing sonic bomb".

The more experimental follow-up, Xuvetyn, was released in 1996. AllMusic called it "even more of a mindblowing blast than Bloweyelashwish, 20 minutes longer and extending the spirit of that album's collision between brute feedback and serene sculpture in astounding directions".

=== Other projects ===
Cortez formed Astrobrite in 1993 as a parallel project to lovesliescrushing and began performing live under the name in 1995. He subsequently released Astrobrite recordings on the Sonic Syrup label while continuing his work with lovesliescrushing.

In 1997, Cortez and Anderson formed two short lived projects, Vir (who released the "Strika" 7" in 2000 on Drone Records) and Transient Stellar. The latter performed as Lovesliescrushing at Projektfest 1997, utilizing an early melding of jungle and shoegaze.

On November 18–19, 2026, Scott Cortez performed LUX AUREA, a 24-hour continuous drone composition at The Lady of the Boiler House in Grand Rapids, Michigan. Conceived as a sonic tribute to NASA's Voyager 1 spacecraft and its Golden Record, the performance represented the approximate time required for light to travel from Earth to Voyager 1. Cortez was joined by lovesliescrushing vocalist Melissa Arpin-Duimstra for several sections of the performance. The performance began on November 18 and ended at noon on November 19, completing the 24-hour journey.

=== Later career ===
Lovesliescrushing followed up Xuvetyn with the release of Glissceule in 2002 on the Sonic Syrup label. AllMusic called it "a mesmerizing collection of beautiful noise, 17 tracks of pearly lightness, angelically naïve with drumless textures". It was followed later that year by Voirshn, a Projekt release consisting of tracks that were left off of "Glissceule". These albums relied on heavily processed guitar, and Cortez dubbed the band's new sound "glitch bliss".

The a cappella Chorus album appeared in 2007 on the Peru-based Automatic Entertainment label; a reworked version, CRWTH (Chorus Redux), was issued by the Line label in 2010.

In 2010, Projekt issued the Girl. Echo. Suns. Veils. box set, which included a bonus second disc titled Avianium (Microphona Magnetica); the latter was also issued separately as Aviatrix.

Lovesliescrushing released two albums in 2012, Shiny Tiny Stars (Handmade Birds) and Glinter (Thisquietarmy Records). They self-released the Ghost Colored Halo digital EP in 2013, reissued two years later on CD by Projekt.

In 2020 they returned with a split album with Peruvian noise artist Fiorella16 titled "Extrañas Letanías" the album featured a more dreary atmosphere and was released with no promotion.

In May 2025, The Numero Group announced that loveliescrushing has joined the label's roster.

The label subsequently released an expanded deluxe edition of Bloweyelashwish, followed by a reissue of Xuvetyn. A reissue of the band's 2002 album Glissceule was also announced.

== Artistry and influences ==
Lovesliescrushing's music combines the dense, distorted guitar textures of shoegaze with the sustained atmospheres of ambient music and drone music. Rather than relying on conventional rock song structures, the duo uses layers of guitar feedback, distortion and effects to create immersive, often percussion-free soundscapes. Vocalist Melissa Arpin-Duimstra's ethereal, frequently wordless singing blends into Scott Cortez's heavily processed guitar textures. Writing for AllMusic, Ned Raggett described the group's early recordings as combining intense feedback and noise with serene, dreamlike passages, noting their departure from conventional pop hooks. Later recordings further emphasized ambient textures, guitar loops and abstract compositions.

Cortez is acclaimed for his technical creativity, use of studio effects and for recording all the lovesliescrushing albums on a TASCAM Portastudio. In a 2010 interview, he said, "I use several loopers, EQ and reverb mostly to manipulate time and sound. I also have had a few custom instruments to explore new textures. But the most important gear are my ears and brain, without them, you have no imagination running the tools."

Cortez has cited influences such as My Bloody Valentine, John Cage, Cocteau Twins, Brian Eno, Robert Fripp, Adrian Belew, György Ligeti, Harold Budd, Jon Hassell, Steve Reich, Terry Riley, Arvo Pärt, Henryk Górecki, Glenn Branca and film soundtracks.

== Discography ==
=== Studio albums ===
- Bloweyelashwish (1992, Lullaby; 1994 reissue, Projekt Records)
- Xuvetyn (1996, Projekt Records)
- Global and Available split with Freezing Butterfly (2001, Type Records)
- Glissceule (2002, Sonic Syrup)
- Voirshn (2002, Projekt Records)
- Chorus (2007, Automatic Entertainment)
- CRWTH (Chorus Redux) (2010, Line)
- Girl. Echo. Suns. Veils. (2010, Projekt Records)
- Aviatrix (2010, Projekt Records)
- Shiny Tiny Stars (2012, Handmade Birds)
- Glinter (2012, Thisquietarmy Records)
- Extrañas Letanías split with Fiorella16 (2020, Astromelia)

=== EPs ===
- Ghost Colored Halo (2013, self-released; 2015, Projekt Records)

=== Singles ===
- "Youreyesimmaculate" 7" (1994, Projekt Records)
- "Heart of Fire" digital (2011, EverythingIsChemical)

=== Compilation appearances ===
- "Babysbreath (Mycomion)" on Terra X - Vol. 1 Love and Hate (1993, Terra X Records)
- "Babysbreath" on Beneath the Icy Floe - Projekt Record's Sampler (1994, Projekt Records)
- "Teardrop/Dizzy" on Beneath the Icy Floe. V. 2 (1994, Projekt Records)
- "These Fleeting Moments" on Of These Reminders (1994, Projekt Records)
- "Babysbreath" on Beneath the Icy Floe, V. 3 (1995, Projekt Records)
- "Jingle Bells (Snowblower)" on Excelsis (A Dark Noël) (1995, Projekt Records)
- "Bones of Angels" on Beneath the Icy Floe V. 4 - A Projekt Sampler (1996, Projekt Records)
- "Blooded & Blossom-Blown" on Beneath the Icy Floe V.5 (1997, Projekt Records)
- "Lips to Kiss" on Splashed with Many a Speck (1997, Dewdrops Records)
- "Valerian (Mix 1)" on Projekt 100: The Early Years 1985-1995 (2000, Projekt Records)
- "Nipra" on Losing Yesterday (2000, Bluesanct)
- "Pink Blind" on Epithalamia (2000, Clairecords)
- "Sofvx" on Projekt 2003.1 (2003, Projekt Records)
- "Your Eyes Immaculate" on Projekt 200 (2007, Projekt Records)
- "The Way of the Sea (Deep Blue)" on Glass (2012, Rádio Etiópia)
