= Spare Snare =

Scottish lo-fi band

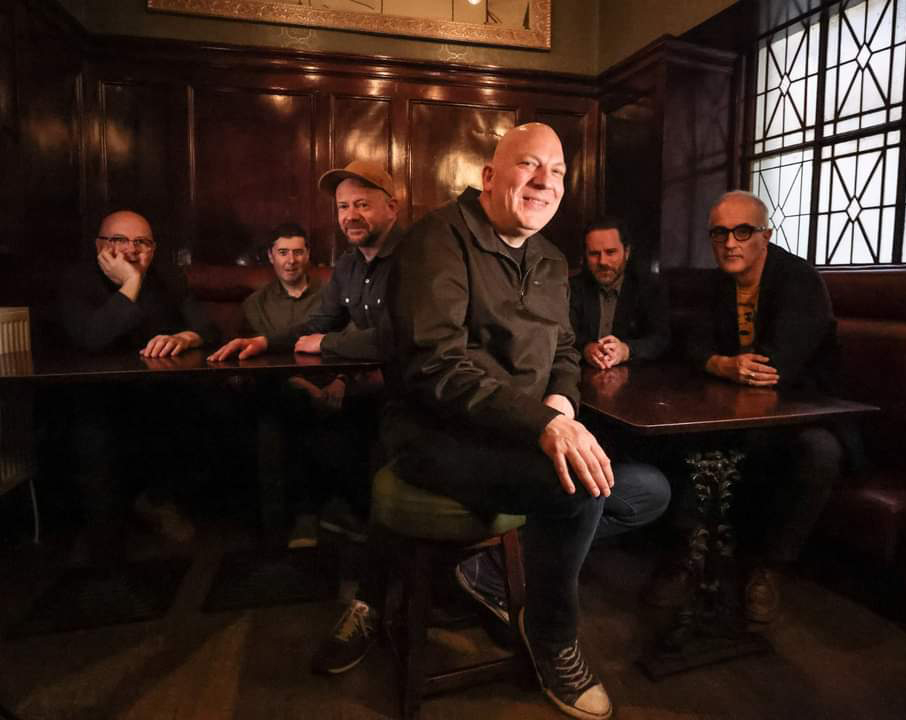
- Left to right: Barry Gibson, Adam Lockhart, Alan Cormack, Jan Burnett, Michael Lambert and Graeme Ogston

Background information
- Origin: Dundee, Scotland
- Genres: No-fi, lo-fi, alternative
- Years active: 1991–present
- Label: Chute Records
- Members: Jan Burnett; Alan Cormack; Barry Gibson; Graeme Ogston; Adam Lockhart; Michael Lambert
- Past members: Paul Esposito; Ross Mathieson; Ross Thompson; Graham Anderson
- Website: http://www.wearethesnare.com

Spare Snare is a lo-fi band from Dundee, Scotland, who were voted as the 46th best Scottish band of all time.

Founded in the early 1990s, the band have released 12 albums and 2 compilations to date, released on their own Chute Records, or licensed to another label. They have also recorded four John Peel Sessions. In the 1995 John Peel Festive 50, the band were number 32 with "Bugs".

Spare Snare have been cited as an influence on acts such as Snow Patrol and the Fence Collective.

Along with Mogwai, The Delgados, Bis, Arab Strap, Urusei Yatsura, Ganger and Long Fin Killie, Spare Snare were part of the mid 1990s 'New Scottish Underground' scene.

In 2008 they covered "Amazing Grace" for BBC Radio 2’s Aled Jones Sunday show. Spare Snare are the only band to have recorded sessions for both John Peel and Aled Jones.

Spare Snare released their 8th studio album, Victor, in June 2010, which was voted the 19th Best Scottish Album of 2010.

The band made two rare live appearances at the Fence Collective Homegame festival in Anstruther and Tigerfest in Dunfermline in 2010.

Two live sessions were performed for Marc Riley's BBC Radio 6 Music show on 16 July 2009 and 25 September 2018.

Spare Snare released their 9th studio album, Our Jazz, in April 2013, which was voted the 7th Best Scottish Album of 2013.

In February 2018, Spare Snare recorded their 11th album, Sounds Recorded by Steve Albini with producer Steve Albini. As well as the recording, Spare Snare and Albini presented a one-day Engineers' Workshop at Chem19 Studios in Blantyre, Scotland.

It was announced in April 2022 that Spare Snare would record their 12th album, again with Steve Albini, in October 2022. Spare Snare released The Brutal on 12 May 2023.

In August 2024, Spare Snare performed live as part of the Wedding Present's At The Edge Of The Sea Festival in Brighton.

== Members ==
- Jan Burnett – vocals, guitar, electronics, melodica
- Alan Cormack – guitar, bass, drums, synths
- Barry Gibson – drums, bass, guitar
- Graeme Ogston – guitar, bass, synths
- Adam Lockhart – guitar, synths, bass, voice
- Michael Lambert – bass, synths, health & safety

== Discography ==
=== Albums ===
- Live at Home - released 1995 on Chute
- Disco Dancing - Compilation released 1995 on 100 Guitar Mania, licensed from Chute
- Westfield Lane - released 1996 on Wabana, licensed from Chute
- Animals and Me Released 1998 on Chute
- Love Your Early Stuff - Compilation released 1999 on Che, licensed from Chute
- Charm - released 2001 on Chute
- Learn to Play - released 2004 on Chute
- Garden Leave - released September 2006 on Chute
- I Love You, I Hate You - released June 2009 on Chute
- Victor - released June 2010 on Chute
- Our Jazz - released April 2013 on Chute
- Unicorn - released August 2017 on Chute
- Sounds Recorded by Steve Albini - released July 2018 on Chute
- The Brutal - released May 2023 on Chute

=== Singles and non-album songs ===
This table shows all songs released as singles, and other songs that do not appear on Spare Snare studio albums.

Song title	B-side	Label	Year	Release info
"Super Slinky"	"As a Matter of Fact"	Chute	1992/1993	UK 7" with hand painted numbered sleeve. Original pressing of 110 had blue back print. Second pressing of 100 had red back print. Some copies included a 'Chute no wave' badge.
"Super Slinky"	"As a Matter of Fact"	Prospective	1993	US 7" with hand numbered sleeve. Slightly different mix of "As a Matter of Fact" compared to the UK 7".
"Thorns (One)"	"Shine on Now"	Prospective	1994	US 7" with two colour sleeve. The first recording of "Thorns", before the UK single.
"Thorns"	"Skateboard Punk Rocker"	Chute	1994	UK 7" with hand painted numbered sleeve. Pressed as an edition of 617 in three different coloured sleeves.
"I Got You"	"If JFA Were Still Together" (Majesty Crush)	Che	1995	UK 7" split with Majesty Crush released on numbered coloured (green / clear) vinyl. "I Got You" is a cover of the Split Enz song.
"Bruising You"	n/a	Fierce Panda	1995	Appears on Mortal Wombat, a UK 7" double pack compilation, featuring various artists, including Super Furry Animals and Baby Bird, among others.
"Smile, It's Sugar" (Spare Snare)	"French Campus" (Sone)	Anti-Social	1995	US 7" split with Sone release with hand coloured umbrella, various colours and variations were available.
"Wired for Sound"	n/a	Deceptive	1995	UK one sided 7" featuring a cover version of the Cliff Richard song. "MERRY XMAS MR WEBB" is etched on side two. Available in a rubber stamped Christmas envelope as part of a series of Christmas singles on the Deceptive label. Around 200 copies were signed by Spare Snare and sent to their mailing list.
"Wired for Sound"	"Bugs"	Prospective	1996	US 7" featuring live tracks recorded at Radio K, Minneapolis in 1994. "Wired for Sound" is not the Cliff Richard cover version, but a Spare Snare song originally featured on the 1995 album Live at Home.
"Smile, It's Sugar"	"Indiekidsuck" / "Hanging Around"	Deceptive	1996	UK cassette single with 30 minutes of blank tape, allowing the owner to send it back and get 30 minutes of "live stuff, chat and noise" recorded onto the tape. Single also available on 7" and CD.
"Smile, It's Sugar"	"Indiekidsuck" / "Hanging Around" / "Boom Boom Boom"	Deceptive	1996	UK 4 track CD, also available on 7" and cassette.
"Haircut" (Spare Snare)	"Aye Aye Captain" (Lazer Boy)	Chute	1996	UK 7" split with Lazer Boy, with hand painted rubber stamped sleeve.
"Boom Boom Boom (One)" (Spare Snare)	"Away from the City"	100 Guitar Mania	1996	Japanese 7" in blue vinyl and numbered.
"Bruising You"	"What You've Done"	Third Gear	1998	US 7" available on clear or black vinyl. Features a different version of "Bruising You" to that on the Mortal Wombat 7".
"Hard of Hearing"	"Lesbians in Waistcoats"	Lissy's	1998	UK 7" release.
"Everybody Knows That"	"Say My Name"	Chute	2001	UK 7" featuring covers of The Humblebums and Destiny's Child.
"Calling in the Favours"	"Launch"	Bad Jazz	2001	UK 7" on white vinyl.
"Sort It for Afterwards"	"In the City"	Chute	2006	UK 7" on purple vinyl. 525 copies pressed.
"Riding (Bracken Mix)" (Spare Snare)	"Lost" (And His Voice Became)	Bracken	2006	UK 7" two-tone (blue and white) numbered coloured vinyl split single with And His Voice Became. Both songs exclusive to this release. Hand-made artwork on 90% re-cycled paper, 300 copies pressed.
