= Burnt Hair Records =

Michigan record label

- Parent company: unknown
- Founded: 1990
- Founder: Larry Hofmann
- Status: Inactive
- Distributor: independent
- Genre: Space rock, drone
- Country of origin: United States
- Location: Dearborn, MI

Burnt Hair Records was a record label involved with Michigan's space rock alternative music scene in the 1990s. The label is said to have been most responsible for cultivating the Detroit sound of this period. Burnt Hair recorded artists in various experimental genres also known by appellations such as indie pop, indie rock, ambient music, drone music, dream pop and electronica. The label was founded by Larry Hofmann in Dearborn. Burnt Hair released recordings by artists and bands including Windy & Carl, Hopewell, Mahogany, Ten Second Dynasty, Miss Bliss, Tomorrowland, DELTA WAVES, Starphase 23, Füxa, Auburn Lull, Monaural (Band), Gravity Wax, Asha Vida, Flowchart (DJ Sean O'Neal) and Alison's Halo.

== History ==
Burnt Hair records was "unquestionably the label most responsible for cultivating Detroit's sound" of space rock, one of the most exciting regional scenes to emerge in the latter half of the 1990s.

Larry Hofmann was a DJ on WHFR and helped many bands make their first recordings.

Burnt Hair launched the band Mahogany's recording career started after Larry Hofmann saw the band perform in 1996. Burnt Hair released a split 12" for them. Burnt Hair also recorded Mahogany's The Dream of a Modern Day 51 minute CD. Mahogany's Andrew Prinz produced and designed the sleeve for Auburn Lull's debut album Alone I Admire, which was released on Burnt Hair and reissued by California by Darla Records in 2002. Burnt Hair also released Mahogany's 2000 album The Dream of a Modern Day that Darla Records calls "their favorite album of 2000". It was later rereleased on Darla Records. Monaural

Burnt Hair also issued the debut album of Michigan band Monaural with the 12" EP Harmonic/ Rhodes in 1996. The instrumental music of the two long tracks was said to have been inspired by the British shoegazers. Monaural used live instrumentation recorded into their computers. Burnt Hair also recorded space trio Asha Vida, a band that "became the epitome of the American underground band" and "managed to mass a small international cult following, as well as critical acclaim." The group offered the underground music press an alternative to grunge in the early '90s, and "Attention was briefly diverted by the discovery of a small, but flourishing Michigan-based space-rock scene... including ethereal-minded bands from the Detroit area (that) flooded the market with singles and 45s, all attempting to get a piece of the psychedelic rock pie." On Asha Vida's 1998 Burnt Hair records release, Nature's Clumsy Hand, the trio abandoned traditional song structure and created "a sonic feast of live improvs and art-noise bliss".

Burnt Hair recorded Alison's Halo's debut full-length CD album Eyedazzler, a collection of "spaced-out dreampop recorded over the course of 4 years" from 1992 to 96. The songs were captured to "glorious" 2,4, & 8 cassette portastudios at the band's own Jetpack Studios. Tracks include: Raindrop, Wishes, Melt, Chime, Always April, Slowbleed, Torn, Leech, Sunshy, Chalkboard James and two bonus live tracks recorded at 1995's Beautiful Noise Festival. The album was reviewed in the UK. At the end period of the label Burnt Hair released the DELTA WAVES which was a split release with Top Quality Rock & Roll in 2002 called the DELTA WAVES dream in real time . This was a mix of all things Burnt Hair (space rock, drone, electronic, shoegaze, and experimental).

== Music genre ==
The space rock music genre has British roots from the 60s and 70s with bands such as Pink Floyd. The genre saw a revival in the 1990s including regional music scenes and grass roots interest that developed into small independent record labels in various countries. Distribution methods for the groups and their independent labels included cassette releases of 50 or so at a time, magazine give-away promotions and tribute album compilations. Sometimes recorded on 2, 4, and 8 track tapes, the music was also traded among college students in a wired world. The limited release singles were later collected in "singles compilations" where the often out-of-print tracks and sometimes a few alternate takes and live recordings, such as from a local Detroit public radio station, filled out the releases.

Fans of the bands recorded by Burnt Hair refer to the music as dreampop, indie pop, drone, ethereal, avant garde, alternative and ambience layered over electronic percussion. The music has also been described using adjectives like swooshy, swirly, dreamy, noisy, whammybarorama music, and been referred to as electronica, indie rock, and Americana. Reverb drenched guitars, keyboard synthesizers and effects pedals are used for effect.

== Partial discography ==
- Windy & Carl Instrumentals EP Single (Burnt Hair Records 1994)
- Gravity Wax Toma Coast 7" debut release w/ 6 inserts (BHR-002)
- Füxa Free Your Soul (Burnt Hair - 7") 1995
- Windy & Carl/Hopewell 7" split single 1995
- Monaural EP Harmonic 1996
- Alison's Halo Eyedazzler (debut full-length CD album, a collection of from 1992 to 1996)
- Auburn Lull/Mahogany EP (a split 12")
- Mahogany The Dream of a Modern Day CD
- Auburn Lull Alone I Admire (Burnt Hair, 1999) (reissued on Darla Records in 2002)
- Tomorrowland Futurist 7" (Digital Release Date: February 22, 2000 UPC: 669910477014) Track List: 1) Futurist 2) Sea of Tranquility
- Flowchart Hollow Sky EP (7") 1997
- Hopewell
- Ten Second Dynasty / Miss Bliss 7" Bliss
- Delta Waves the DELTA WAVES dream in real time (debut full length cd released 2002) split label release with Top Quality Rock & Roll...
- Four Hour Window liquified / clouds in my head 7", 33 ⅓ RPM, Green
