= Long Fin Killie =

- Origin: Glasgow, Scotland
- Genres: Indie rock; post-rock; math rock; shoegaze; post-punk
- Years active: 1993–1998
- Labels: Too Pure; American

Long Fin Killie were a Scottish indie rock band. They released three albums and several EPs on the British label Too Pure in the 1990s.

== History ==
Long Fin Killie's core lineup consisted of Luke Sutherland (vocals, violin, guitar, mandolin, bouzouki, saxophone, hammer dulcimer, thumb piano, etc.), Colin Greig (electric and upright bass), David Turner (drums/percussion), and Philip Cameron (electric guitar). Additionally, Kenneth McEwan (drums/percussion) joined in 1996. Sutherland had previously been in a band called Fenn, based in Glasgow, who played many support gigs, including Ride and Catherine Wheel. Their name was taken from a family of ornamental freshwater fishes known as killifishes, noted for their interesting drought survival and reproductive habits.

The members were all highly trained, enabling them to create complex, atypical music which usually featured hypnotically-bowed violins/celli, jazz-influenced drumming, and meandering ambient passages. Allmusic cited them as having "staggering levels of musicianly talent". Vocalist Luke Sutherland often delivered his cryptic, highly literate lyrics in an androgynous falsetto voice.

Their debut EP Buttergut was released in 1994, with debut album Houdini following the next year. The band's sound, though diverse, was influenced by the likes of A.R. Kane, Can, Van der Graaf Generator, The Fall and labelmates Moonshake, Pram and Laika. Mark E. Smith of The Fall contributed "guest rants" to the song "The Heads of Dead Surfers," which appeared in 1995 on the EP of the same name, as well as on Houdini. (Listeners to British DJ John Peel's radio show voted this the No. 10 best song of 1995 in the "Festive Fifty" list of that year.) LFK toured America in 1995 with the band Medicine; a split EP was released to promote it.

The band received widespread critical acclaim, but little to no radio play, though they did tour on the 1996 edition of Lollapalooza as part of its "second stage," in support of their 1996 second LP Valentino. While driving from Sweden to Norway in late 1996, the band's tour bus was involved in a major accident on a patch of ice, causing Sutherland to suffer a collapsed lung, broken ribs and collar bone, and other injuries. He began writing his first novel, Jelly Roll, while recuperating from the crash. In 1997, Turner was replaced by Kenny McEwan on drums. Subsequent album Amelia (1998) featured songs of shorter lengths and more conventional structures, but it proved to be their last. The group disbanded shortly afterwards, to little mainstream notice, in 1998.

== Recurring themes ==
All of the band's albums had one-word titles honouring public icons who died at early ages: escape artist Harry Houdini, actor Rudolph Valentino and pilot Amelia Earhart, respectively. Their releases almost all featured intricate woodcut-style graphic design; Valentino used woodcuts by 16th-century printmaker Albrecht Dürer.

Many of the lyrics featured on Valentino address issues such as racism, sexism and misogyny. In a 1996 interview with Lollipop Magazine, when asked about the repetition of certain lyrical phrases, Luke Sutherland explained: "It’s sort of a continuation of the music. Houdini was mostly about racism and sexism, and Valentino is a continuation of that, with the focus a little more on the sexism".

== Post-breakup work ==
Following the band's break-up, its former members moved on to other projects. Sutherland helmed the slightly more accessible group Bows, which released two albums on Too Pure. Sutherland now lives in London and has written the novels Jelly Roll (described by L.S. as "vaguely autobiographical"; Anchor, 1998), Sweetmeat (Anchor, 2002), and Venus As A Boy (Bloomsbury, 2004). He has also played violin with fellow Scottish band Mogwai. After Bows and Long Fin Killie, he played in Music A.M. and he is currently a member of the band Rev Magnetic.

Greig now lives in Stockholm, Sweden, and runs the independent record label Cocohippo. He also performs his own music under the moniker Wilma Cakebread. Turner lives in London and records his own music under the name Disco Haircut Astronaut.

Kenneth McEwan published a post-apocalyptic novel, Ghosts of Yule, in 2008. He now lives in England with his family and wife, making solo electronic music.

== Discography ==
=== Albums ===
- Houdini (1995, Too Pure/American) (PURE 47)
- Valentino (1996, Too Pure/American/Warner Bros.) (PURE 54)
- Amelia (1997/98, Too Pure) (PURE 74)

=== EPs ===
- Buttergut EP (1994, Too Pure) (PURE 39)
- The Heads of Dead Surfers EP (1995, Too Pure) (PURE 44)
- Split EP with Medicine (1995, Too Pure/American)
- Hands And Lips EP (1996, Too Pure) (PURE 58)
- Lipstick EP (1997, Too Pure) (PURE 75)

=== Various-artist compilations ===
- The Camden Crawl (1995, Love Train) (PUBE 07) LFK's song: "The Heads of Dead Surfers"
- Monsters, Robots And Bug Men: A User's Guide To The Rock Hinterland 2xCD (1996, Virgin) LFK's song: "(A) Man Ray"
