= Mahogany (band) =

American multidisciplinary media ensemble

- Origin: Michigan
- Genres: Ambient pop; shoegaze; dream pop; post-rock; indie electronic; indie rock
- Years active: 1995–present
- Labels: Burnt Hair, Tinseltones, Blackbean & Placenta Tape Club, Clairecords, Simdisc, Amberley, Elefant, Darla, Track & Field, Renovo, BLVD Records
- Members: Andrew Prinz; Jaclyn Slimm
- Past members: Allysa Massais; Marissa von Wohl; Jesse Rafferty; Sara Dennard; Robert Pietrusko; Lorraine Lelis; Ana Breton; Jason Holmes; Jeremy Scott; Katrina Rudmin; Roy Styles; Ryan Hancock; Jeremy Scott; Odell Nails
- Website: mahogany.nu

Mahogany are an American band formed in Michigan in 1995 and currently working in Philadelphia, New York City, Chicago, and other locations. The band incorporates vocals, cello, guitars, pianos, melodicas, sequencers, synthesizers, samplers, tape, percussion, and other instruments. Mahogany also use film, video, animation, cinema, graphic design, photography, typography and other realization and rendering techniques for a cumulative effect that the band refers to as the "Hypercube".

Mahogany have released two critically acclaimed full-length albums, The Dream of the Modern Day (2000) and Connectivity! (2006), as well as numerous singles, EPs and compilation tracks collected on Memory Column: Early Works and Rarities 1996-2004 (2005). They have performed live with Clinic, Luna, Broadcast, Vampire Weekend, Spoon, Chairlift, Bloc Party, Interpol, Serena Maneesh, Resplandor and others, maintaining a cult status among the group's listeners. They are also associated with fellow Michigan bands Lovesliescrushing and Astrobrite.

== Foundation ==
Mahogany are the brainchild of Andrew Prinz, created as a response borne of multidisciplinary generational precedent initiated by Prinz's great-grandfather Harry S. Will, a violinist, artist, designer and founder of the Columbus Orchestral Society (who Prinz cites as establishing Mahogany's organizational tabula rasa), and his grandfather Vernon A. Will, a mathematician and guitarist (who, according to Prinz, provided the ensemble's theoretical, aesthetic and ethical basis via his 1961 doctoral thesis The Order of Freedom: An Inquiry into the Theory of Human Selection).

According to Prinz, the band's name references the Kurt Weill/Bertolt Brecht opera Rise and Fall of the City of Mahagonny, as well as the mahogany tree's role as a "precious and beautiful living resource, essential to the Earth's biosphere...and a superior material for the construction of both interiors and musical instruments, prized for its beauty and naturally harmonious resonant characteristics."

The group was founded by Prinz and cellist/vocalist Allysa Massais in 1995 while Prinz attended Michigan State University in East Lansing, Michigan, initially studying music theory and composition, then photography, art history, studio art, and graphic design. With concentrations in cello under Owen Carman and bass with Peter Dominguez, Prinz had already performed with and attended workshops and master classes led by jazz greats like Maynard Ferguson, John Faddis and Dizzy Gillespie before forming the first iteration of Mahogany.

Prior to Mahogany, Prinz collaborated with mentor Scott Cortez in two of the latter's musical projects, Lovesliescrushing and Astrobrite. He contributed cover art photography to Lovesliescrushing's second album Xuvetyn and performed 12-string electric guitar with that band on their 1995 East Coast tour. With Astrobrite, Prinz performed as guitarist in 1995–1996 at both live shows and recording sessions. Prinz also worked with Massais in the music project Century Wheatfield, who debuted in 1995 at the Odeon Theatre in East Lansing, Michigan, with an algorithmic video presentation by René Corriveau; their recordings and the video are assumed lost.

== History ==
Mahogany's first release, the Dual-Group split 12-inch EP with fellow Michigan band Auburn Lull, was released in 1997 on Burnt Hair Records. Prinz and Massais were joined by Prinz's sister, keyboardist Marissa von Wohl (Marissa Kaloga), and the group released various recordings on indie labels such as Tinseltones and Liquefaction.

Mahogany established their own provisional label, Simdisc (a.k.a. Disques de Simultaneous), in 1998 as an equity-driven concern to provide budgeting capital for the group's releases when little or no capital was available for printing or promotion (Simdisc was subsumed by Renovo and Studio Renovo upon the inception of the Renovo concept in May 2003). The 1997 EP What Will Become of the Key of Reason? was reissued jointly by Simdisc and Clairecords in 1998.

The group's debut full-length album, The Dream of a Modern Day, was recorded in 1998 (augmented by Asha Vida's Jesse Rafferty on percussion) and was initially issued on Burnt Hair in 2000, then reissued in 2001 on Darla Records (CD) and Simdisc/Burnt Hair (LP). Massais left the band after the recording of the album.

In 1999, Prinz and von Wohl relocated to Brooklyn, New York. Joined by several additional musicians (they eventually grew to an octet and even larger live ensembles), Mahogany issued additional compilation tracks. The band's oeuvre was collected on the 1995 Darla 2-CD set Memory Column: Early Works and Rarities 1996-2004.

The group's second album, Connectivity!, featuring production work on several tracks by Robin Guthrie of Cocteau Twins, was issued as a double-CD on Darla in 2006. In February 2007, American webzine Somewhere Cold voted Connectivity! No. 4 on their 2006 Somewhere Cold Awards Hall of Fame.

On November 18, 2009, Prinz declared the ensemble to be "a sovereign city-state canton-town within the country of Renovo." He also said: "Mahogany recognizes the corridor concept city-state Newphilyorkadelphia and the wilds between and beyond. Mahogany seeks rewilding, cessation of egregious production of petroleum-based transportation, integration of city concepts and environs, and reification of both high-speed rail and interurban electric traction."

The band announced their signing to BLVD Records on September 27, 2011. In 2013, Mahogany (down to a duo of Prinz and Jaclyn Slimm) issued a digital single, "Phase Break".

== Discography ==
=== Studio albums ===
- The Dream of a Modern Day (2000, Burnt Hair Records; 2001 Darla Records/Clairecords)
- Connectivity! (2006, Darla Records/Track & Field)

=== Singles and EPs ===
- Dual Group 12-inch split EP with Auburn Lull (1997, Burnt Hair Records)
- Luminous Constructions 7-inch single (1997, Tinseltones TINT 5)
- What Will Become of the Key of Reason? single-sided 12-inch EP (1997, Blackbean & Placenta Tape Club )
- What Will Become of the Key of Reason? CD EP (1997, Simdisc/Clairecords)
- "In the Presence of the Crepuscular" 7-inch single (1999, Amberley/Simdisc)
- "In Search of the Radiant Sun" 7-inch single (1999, Elefant Records)
- "Phase Break" digital single (2013, Renovo)

=== Compilation albums ===
- Memory Column: Early Works and Rarities 1996-2004 (2005, Darla Records)

=== Compilation appearances ===
- "Il Dynamo de Luce" on Clairecords Presents: Solutions & Remedies CD (1998, Clairecords)
- "On The Threshold of the Absolute" on Losing Today Volume I CD (1998, Losing Today)
- "Mindful Contradiction" on Nocturnal Electrics 7-inch EP (1998, Liquefaction Duske)
- "Semaphore Stream/Lines" on 13 Elements CD (1999, Disasters by Choice)
- "Singing Arc Lamp (Natural Satellites Mix)" on Home Is Where You Hang Yourself CD (1999, Tiger Style Records)
- "L'ephemere est Eternel" on Resonances 7-inch EP (2000, Amberley)
- "Bunker Soldiers" (OMD cover) on Pretending to See the Future: A Tribute to OMD CD (2001, Shelflife Records)
- "Soleil Radieux" on Little Darla Has a Treat for You Vol. 16 CD (2001, Darla Records)
- "Accelerations" on Little Darla Has a Treat for You Vol. 18 CD (2002, Darla Record)
- "Planar Cluster, Planar Burst" on Little Darla Has a Treat for You Vol. 24 CD (2006, Darla Records)
- "Supervitesse (Ulrich Schnauss Remix)" on Little Darla Has a Treat for You Vol. 25 CD (2007, Darla Records)

== Mahogany Music in Films ==
"Windmill International A" and exclusive track "Synchromie #3" were featured in Gary Hustwit's 2009 documentary film Objectified. "Windmill International A" was also featured in a documentary film about artist Chris Burden's 2011 sculpture Metropolis II, installed at LACMA.
