= Electric Picnic =

Music and arts festival held in Stradbally, County Laois, Ireland

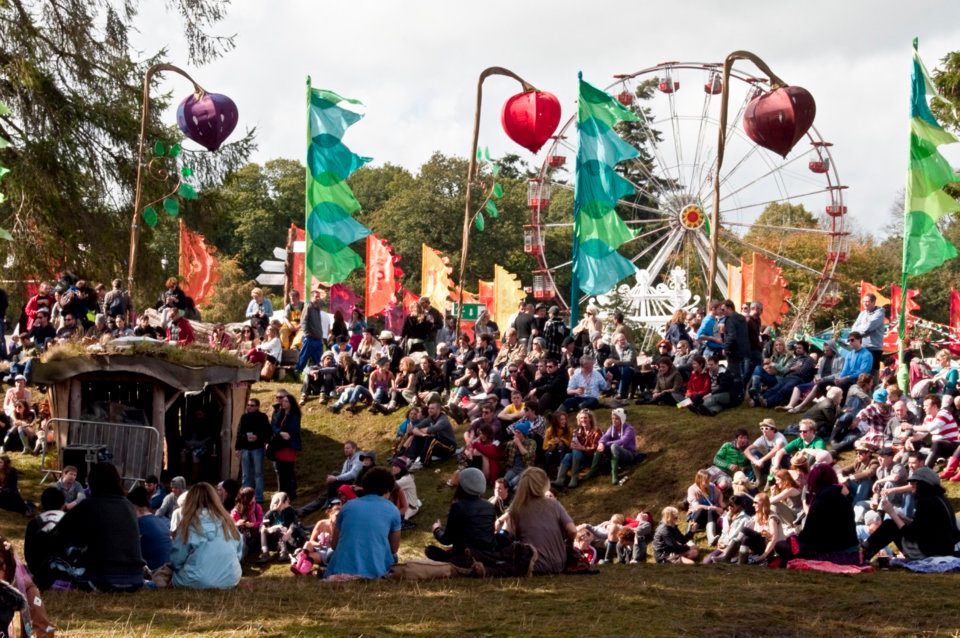
- Body & Soul arena at Electric Picnic 2010
- Status: Active
- Genre: Indie, alternative rock, dance, pop music, hip hop
- Purpose: Music and arts festival
- Begins: 27 August 2027
- Ends: 29 August 2027
- Frequency: Annually
- Venue: Stradbally Hall
- Locations: Stradbally, County Laois, Ireland
- Coordinates: 53.01061°N 7.1554°W
- Country: Ireland
- Years active: 2004–2019, 2022–present
- Inaugurated: 4 September 2004
- Founders: Robbie Butler, John Reynolds and Declan Forde
- Most recent: 28–30 August 2026
- Previous event: 28–30 August 2026
- Next event: 27–29 August 2027
- Attendance: 80,000 (2026)
- Capacity: 80,000
- Festival director: Melvin Benn
- Organiser: Festival Republic / EP Republic Ltd
- Sponsor: Three, Red Bull, Bank of Ireland, Boots, Coca-Cola and Flogas (2026)
- Website: www.electricpicnic.ie

Electric Picnic is an annual arts-and-music festival which has been staged since 2004 at Stradbally Hall in Stradbally, County Laois, Ireland.

== Overview ==
It is organised by Pod Concerts and Festival Republic, who purchased the majority shareholding in 2009. It was voted Best Medium-Sized European Festival at the 2010 European Festival Awards, and has been voted Best Big Festival at each of the last four Irish Festival Awards since they began in 2007. The Electric Picnic won eight awards in Hot Press's 2011 Festival Awards, including 'Best Large Festival'. In 2023, it was awarded 'Festival of the Year' in the Ticketmaster Awards.

The Picnic has been described as "Ireland's version of Glastonbury" and "a great inspiration to Latitude" by one of its business partners, Laois. In 2006 US magazine Billboard called it "a magnificent rock n roll circus, a textbook example of everything a festival should be" and Rolling Stone described it as "one of the best festivals we've ever been to". The 2008 event was described by The Irish Times as "the best Electric Picnic yet".

There is also an emphasis on eco-friendly initiatives.

== History ==
Electric Picnic began as a one-day event in 2004, before growing to a weekend-long festival within a year. The festival incorporates attractions such as the 24-hour cinema tent, the Body and Soul arena (offering an ambient lounge with beanbags, massages and tarot card readings) and the Comedy Tent (curated by Gerry Mallon) and a silent disco. In 2008, Amnesty International attended the festival to celebrate the 60th anniversary of the Universal Declaration of Human Rights, whilst renowned American Burning Man artist, David Best constructed a Temple of Truth on site. Electric Picnic has been described as an "enormously successful, award-winning, established brand" which "attempts to bring to life a microcosmic cultural experience where music is just the tip of the iceberg".

== Festival summary by year ==
| Year | Dates | Headliners | Attendance or sales |
|---|---|---|---|
| 2004 | 4 September | 2 Many DJs, Groove Armada, Super Furry Animals | 10,000 |
| 2005 | 3–4 September | Kraftwerk · Fatboy Slim · The Flaming Lips ·Röyksopp · Arcade Fire · Damien Dempsey · Laurent Garnier · Nick Cave and the Bad Seeds · Mercury Rev · 2 Many DJs · Audio Bullys | |
| 2006 | 1–3 September | Massive Attack · Antony & the Johnsons · Groove Armada · New Order · Basement Jaxx · Yeah Yeah Yeahs | 30,000 |
| 2007 | 31 August – 2 September | LCD Soundsystem · Bjork · Chemical Bros · Beastie Boys · Primal Scream · Iggy & The Stooges | 32,500 |
| 2008 | 29–31 August | Sigur Rós · Digitalism · George Clinton · Underworld · Sex Pistols · My Bloody Valentine | 35,000 |
| 2009 | 4–6 September | Brian Wilson · The Flaming Lips · Basement Jaxx · MGMT · Orbital · Madness · Fleet Foxes · Bell X1 · Rodrigo y Gabriela · Chic | |
| 2010 | 3–5 September | Roxy Music · Leftfield · Massive Attack | |
| 2011 | 2–4 September | Interpol · PJ Harvey · Jimmy Cliff · Arcade Fire · The Chemical Brothers · Pulp · Underworld · Beirut | |
| 2012 | 31 August – 2 September | Sigur Rós · The XX · Christy Moore · The Cure · Orbital · The Killers · Elbow · Hot Chip | |
| 2013 | 30 August – 1 September | Fatboy Slim · Bjork · Arctic Monkeys · Robert Plant | 32,000 |
| 2014 | 29–31 August | Portishead · Outkast · Beck | 41,000 |
| 2015 | 4–6 September | Florence and the Machine · Blur · Sam Smith · Underworld · Grace Jones | 51,000 |
| 2016 | 2–4 September | LCD Soundsystem · Lana Del Rey · The Chemical Brothers · New Order · Noel Gallagher's High Flying Birds | 55,000 |
| 2017 | 1–3 September | The XX · A Tribe Called Quest · Duran Duran | 55,000 |
| 2018 | 31 August – 2 September | Kendrick Lamar · Massive Attack · The Prodigy · N.E.R.D. · Picture This | 55,000 |
| 2019 | 30 August – 1 September | The Strokes · Florence and the Machine · Hozier · The 1975 | 57,500 |
| 2020 | 4–6 September | Rage Against The Machine · Snow Patrol · The Chemical Brothers · Picture This · Lewis Capaldi | Cancelled |
| 2022 | 2–4 September | Dermot Kennedy · Megan Thee Stallion · Tame Impala · Picture This · Arctic Monkeys · Snow Patrol | 70,000 |
| 2023 | 1–3 September | Billie Eilish · Niall Horan · Fred Again · Paolo Nutini (replacing Lewis Capaldi) · The Killers · The Script | 70,000 |
| 2024 | 16–18 August | Noah Kahan · Gerry Cinnamon · Calvin Harris · Kodaline · Kylie Minogue · Raye | 75,000 |
| 2025 | 29 August – 1 September | Hozier · Chappell Roan · Sam Fender · Kings of Leon · Kneecap · Jazzy | 80,000 |
| 2026 | 28-30 August | Lewis Capaldi, Gorrilaz, Fontaines D.C., Sombr, CMAT, Amble, Zara Larsson | 80,000 |
| 2027 | 27-29 August | Unconfirmed | |

=== 2004 festival ===
The 2004 festival was a one-day event, which was headlined by 2 Many DJs. Other acts included Groove Armada, Arrested Development, Jurassic5, Grand Master Flash, Super Furry Animals, Plump DJ's, David Kitt, Soulwax and Mylo. Despite the fact that there was no organised camping, a number of groups camped in the field designated as the car park overnight and stayed up talking and exploring the (then pristine and nettle-free) woods. Thus, the relaxed and friendly vibe of the earlier Electric Picnic festivals was established.

The stage-by-stage running order has not been independently verified; the table below therefore lists only acts reported to have performed, without assigning them to a particular stage.

Saturday 4 September

Festival performers (stage assignments unavailable):

- 2 Many DJs / Soulwax
- Groove Armada
- Super Furry Animals
- Arrested Development
- Jurassic 5
- Grandmaster Flash
- Plump DJs
- David Kitt
- Mylo

=== 2005 festival ===
The 2005 festival took place on Saturday 3 September and Sunday 4 September. It is best remembered for Arcade Fire's performance which came before their subsequent mainstream success. Headlining acts included Nick Cave and the Bad Seeds, Kraftwerk, The Flaming Lips, Röyksopp, Mercury Rev and The Human League.

The premiere of "Electric Picnic: The Documentary" took place at the Irish Film Institute on Tuesday 4 July 2006 at 19:00. The critically acclaimed documentary directed by Nick Ryan, was filmed by a small camera crew who recorded the events of Electric Picnic 2005. Narrated by musician Nick Seymour and economist David McWilliams, the documentary includes footage from Kraftwerk's first recorded live performance in twelve years plus interviews with the performing bands and comedians, with a few festival-goers and with the locals of Stradbally Village, who claimed: "We get more trouble at the Vintage Steam Rally".

The following tables present the two-day programme by stage, based on an archived contemporary timetable and a festival announcement.

| Saturday 3 September | Sunday 4 September |
|---|---|
| Main Stage: Fatboy Slim; The Flaming Lips; Doves; Damien Dempsey; Stereo MCs; Dennis Alcapone & Band; The Herbaliser; Matthew Herbert Big Band | Main Stage: Nick Cave and the Bad Seeds; Mercury Rev; James Blunt; LCD Soundsystem; Toots & the Maytals; Declan O’Rourke; Jazz Jamaica; Dublin Gospel Choir |

| Saturday 3 September | Sunday 4 September |
|---|---|
| Electric Arena: Kraftwerk; Röyksopp; Arcade Fire; Goldfrapp; Mixmaster Mike; Hot Chip; Semifinalists | Electric Arena: Soulwax / 2 Many DJs; Lemon Jelly; Audio Bullys; The Human League; Róisín Murphy; Husky Rescue; WhoMadeWho; Blue Ghost |

| Saturday 3 September | Sunday 4 September |
|---|---|
| Crawdaddy Stage: Asian Dub Foundation; Amp Fiddler; Caesars; The Devlins; The Chalets; Be Your Own Pet; Robert Post; Emmet Tinley; Daves Radio | Crawdaddy Stage: De La Soul; The Kills; Bob Mould Band; JJ72; The Subways; The Rakes; Do Me Bad Things; Clor; The Redneck Manifesto; The Rags |

=== 2006 festival ===
In 2006 the festival gained momentum, with all 30,000 tickets (each costing €175 including camping) selling out more than seven weeks in advance. Presale tickets went on sale on Monday 28 November 2005. The event took place on the weekend of 1–3 September 2006, with the line-up being revealed on Friday 24 March. Artists who performed across the seven stages included Sparks, New Order, Pet Shop Boys, Basement Jaxx, Rufus Wainwright, Bloc Party, Yeah Yeah Yeahs, Gary Numan, François Kevorkian, Groove Armada, Damien Rice and The Frames. The Blue Nile's appearance was their only live performance of the year. The festival's biggest casualty was Gnarls Barkley who had to cancel their appearance after rapper/singer Cee-Lo strained his vocal cords. David McWilliams made an appearance as a celebrity. RTÉ Two televised the festival, with a special RTÉ Two Green Room being set up at Stradbally Hall Estate for presenters Tom Dunne and Jenny Huston.

Journalist and television presenter Joe O'Shea was arrested for driving in an intoxicated state on his way home from the event.

The Comedy Tent in 2006 featured PJ Gallagher, Des Bishop, Neil Delamere, and Eric Lalor.

The following tables list the scheduled acts by stage and day, ordered from the final scheduled set to the earliest. Other areas are not exhaustively listed.

| Friday 1 September | Saturday 2 September | Sunday 3 September |
|---|---|---|
| Main Stage: Massive Attack; Antony and the Johnsons; Devendra Banhart; Youngblood Brass Band; Dulsori Drum Project | Main Stage: Groove Armada; New Order; Bloc Party; Super Furry Animals; The Skatalites; Michael Franti & Spearhead; Koop | Main Stage: Basement Jaxx; Yeah Yeah Yeahs; Amadou & Mariam; Elbow; The Blue Nile; Alabama 3; Dublin Gospel Choir |

| Friday 1 September | Saturday 2 September | Sunday 3 September |
|---|---|---|
| Electric Arena: Damien Rice; Mogwai; dEUS | Electric Arena: The Frames; Belle and Sebastian; DJ Shadow; Broken Social Scene; Gary Numan; Mad Professor; Messiah J & The Expert | Electric Arena: Pet Shop Boys; Rufus Wainwright; The Rapture; Hot Chip; Grandmaster Melle Mel & Scorpio; DJ Grazzhoppa’s DJ Big Band; Duke Dumont |

| Friday 1 September | Saturday 2 September | Sunday 3 September |
|---|---|---|
| Crawdaddy Stage: PJ Harvey; Amp Fiddler; Jah Wobble’s English Roots Band; Red Sirus; The Rumours | Crawdaddy Stage: Graham Coxon; Sparks; Gang of Four; David Kitt; Mundy; Jim Noir; The Rags; Laura Izibor | Crawdaddy Stage: Cut Chemist; Brakes; Josh Ritter; Saul Williams; Richard Hawley; Liam Frost; Catherine Feeny; 8 Ball |

=== 2007 festival ===
Electric Picnic 2007 was once again a three-day event and ran from 31 August until 2 September. The festival maintained its current size of 32,500 festival goers and kept all the same elements plus some new additions. "Early-bird" tickets for the 2007 festival went on sale between Monday 11 December 2006, and Saturday 24 February 2007, costing €199, taking into account the VAT that must now be paid on all outdoor events. Full price tickets went on sale on Tuesday 3 April at a price of €220. The first acts were officially announced on Monday 2 April.

Besides the music other attractions included an inflatable church offering mock weddings, luxury tents, massage chambers, a fairground and silent disco. Acii Disco DJs began the festival on the Friday at 12 p.m. in the Bodytonic Tent. Amongst others to take to the stage on Friday were Björk, Hot Chip, Scott Matthews, Manic Street Preachers and Oppenheimer whilst the unnamed band responsible for The Good, the Bad & the Queen headlined the Electric Arena tent. The Sunday night was brought to a close by Primal Scream.

The festival was marred by the death of a 23-year-old fan. The incident occurred as The Chemical Brothers came to a climax at 2 a.m. early on the Sunday morning. Organiser John Reynolds extended his sympathies and said: "A young man took ill at the festival, was treated at the medical centre, removed to Portlaoise Hospital and was later pronounced dead." Gardaí said they were not treating the death as suspicious.

The following tables list the scheduled acts by stage and day, ordered from the final scheduled set to the earliest. Other areas are not exhaustively listed.

| Friday 31 August | Saturday 1 September | Sunday 2 September |
|---|---|---|
| Main Stage: LCD Soundsystem; Björk; Hot Chip; Ukulele Orchestra of Great Britain | Main Stage: The Chemical Brothers; The Jesus and Mary Chain; The Polyphonic Spree; The Magic Numbers; Easy Star All-Stars; Craig Armstrong; Marlena Shaw & Orchestra; The Company | Main Stage: Primal Scream; Iggy and the Stooges; Sonic Youth; Soul II Soul; Horace Andy; Aim; Luisito Quintero; Dublin Gospel Choir |

| Friday 31 August | Saturday 1 September | Sunday 2 September |
|---|---|---|
| Electric Arena: The Good, the Bad & the Queen; Manic Street Preachers; Paul Hartnoll Band | Electric Arena: Beastie Boys; Erasure; Jarvis Cocker; M.I.A.; !!!; Shy Child; Channel One | Electric Arena: The Go! Team; UNKLE; Clap Your Hands Say Yeah; Rahzel & MC Supernatural; Apparat Band; Mixmaster Mike; Fight Like Apes |

| Friday 31 August | Saturday 1 September | Sunday 2 September |
|---|---|---|
| Crawdaddy Stage: Modest Mouse; Scott Matthews; Oppenheimer; JD Thompson; The Rumours | Crawdaddy Stage: Duke Special; Spiritualized Acoustic Mainlines; Ladytron; Architecture in Helsinki; Fionn Regan; The Undertones; David Geraghty; Candi Payne; Delorentos | Crawdaddy Stage: Damien Dempsey; Kíla; Rilo Kiley; Beastie Boys; The Fall; Two Gallants; The Flaws; Warlords of Pez |

=== 2008 festival ===
Electric Picnic 2008 took place at Stradbally from 29 to 31 August, attended by 35,000 people. Presale tickets went on sale on 9 November 2007 and full price tickets went on sale on Friday 28 March at 9 p.m., costing €240 including camping, with the various sites opening at 9 a.m. on Friday 29 August. Tickets had sold out by 17 June.

Sigur Rós, George Clinton and Sex Pistols headlined. Other musicians appearing included Franz Ferdinand, My Bloody Valentine, German rockers Faust, Tindersticks, The Breeders, Grinderman, Goldfrapp, Gossip, CSS, Duffy, Foals, Hadouken!, Wilco, The Roots, Turin Brakes, Carbon/Silicon, Conor Oberst and New Young Pony Club. Irish acts to appear included The Stunning, Sinéad O'Connor, Christy Moore, Liam Ó Maonlaí, Boss Volenti, The Waterboys, The Flaws, Ham Sandwich, Fred, Super Extra Bonus Party, Jape, Lisa Hannigan, Le Galaxie, Cathy Davey, Gemma Hayes and Mark Geary. Also attending were Amnesty International, which celebrated the 60th anniversary of the Universal Declaration of Human Rights with a singalong of "Happy Birthday" on the Sunday night.

| Friday 29 August | Saturday 30 August | Sunday 31 August |
|---|---|---|
| Main Stage: Sigur Rós; Goldfrapp; Tinariwen; Kíla; Yard Dogs | Main Stage: George Clinton; Franz Ferdinand; Wilco; Duffy; The Herbaliser; Antibulas; Liam Ó Maonlaí; Kormac feat. BS Quartet | Main Stage: Sex Pistols; Gossip; The Roots; Michael Franti & Spearhead; The Congos; Candi Staton; Hayseed Dixie; Dublin Gospel Choir |

| Friday 29 August | Saturday 30 August | Sunday 31 August |
|---|---|---|
| Electric Arena: Digitalism; The Stunning; New Young Pony Club; Le Galaxie | Electric Arena: Underworld; Grace Jones; Elbow; The Breeders; Midnight Juggernauts; Ulrich Schnauss; Super Extra Bonus Party | Electric Arena: My Bloody Valentine; Grinderman; CSS; Sinéad O'Connor; Hercules and Love Affair; Wolfgang Haffner; Cowboy X |

=== 2009 festival ===
Electric Picnic 2009 took place at Stradbally from 4–6 September. The British promoter Festival Republic bought out the share of Aiken Promotions as well as a further majority shareholding in Electric Picnic in March 2009. The festival was launched on 15 April 2009, with tickets going on sale two days later. The launch saw the announcement of forty-seven acts. Orbital, The Flaming Lips, Imelda May, Brian Wilson, Basement Jaxx, Madness, Klaxons, Bell X1, Fleet Foxes and MGMT were some of the musical acts which appeared, whilst Tommy Tiernan headlined in the comedy tent.

The following tables list the scheduled acts by stage and day, ordered from the final scheduled set to the earliest. Other areas are not exhaustively listed.

| Friday 4 September | Saturday 5 September | Sunday 6 September |
|---|---|---|
| Main Stage: Orbital; MGMT; Zero 7; Michael Nyman Orchestra; Smash Hits | Main Stage: 2 Many DJs; Madness; Brian Wilson; Lisa Hannigan; Kid Creole & the Coconuts; Baaba Maal; Tunng; Stee Downes | Main Stage: Basement Jaxx; Bell X1; Alabama 3; The Wailers; Quantic & His Combo Bárbaro; Dublin Gospel Choir |

| Friday 4 September | Saturday 5 September | Sunday 6 September |
|---|---|---|
| Electric Arena: Rodrigo y Gabriela; Seasick Steve; Magazine; David Kitt; 8 Ball | Electric Arena: Chic; Klaxons; Bat for Lashes; Jape; Roots Manuva; The xx; Cap Pas Cap | Electric Arena: The Flaming Lips; Röyksopp; Fleet Foxes; Florence and the Machine; Simian Mobile Disco; Nightmares on Wax; The Sugarhill Gang; Two Door Cinema Club |

| Friday 4 September | Saturday 5 September | Sunday 6 September |
|---|---|---|
| Crawdaddy Stage: Luciano; The Duckworth Lewis Method; ABC; Lykke Li; The Temper Trap; Peter Broderick | Crawdaddy Stage: Chris Cunningham; Four Tet; Explosions in the Sky; Imelda May; Mundy; Billy Bragg; A Flock of Seagulls; Just Jack; David Geraghty; One Day International | Crawdaddy Stage: Damien Dempsey; Amadou & Mariam; Fionn Regan; Echo & the Bunnymen; Laura Izibor; Okkervil River; Mick Flannery; Villagers; Halfset |

=== 2010 festival ===
Early bird tickets for Electric Picnic 2010 went on sale on 4 December 2009. The festival was launched on 24 March 2010, with Leftfield, Roxy Music, Public Image Ltd., LCD Soundsystem, Massive Attack, Modest Mouse, Mumford & Sons, Jón Þór Birgisson, Paul Brady, Imelda May and The Frames among the first acts to be confirmed.

The following tables list the scheduled acts by stage and day, ordered from the final scheduled set to the earliest. Other areas are not exhaustively listed.

| Friday 3 September | Saturday 4 September | Sunday 5 September |
|---|---|---|
| Main Stage: Roxy Music; Modest Mouse; The Waterboys; Janelle Monáe; The Jolly Boys; Donal Dineen, Niwel Tsumbu & Friends | Main Stage: Leftfield; The Frames; Imelda May; Seasick Steve; Afro Celt Sound System; Hypnotic Brass Ensemble; Heathers; Mountain Man; Brian Deady | Main Stage: Massive Attack; The National; Mumford & Sons; Friendly Fires; Dennis Alcapone; Bonobo (live); Cymande II; Dublin Gospel Choir |

| Friday 3 September | Saturday 4 September | Sunday 5 September |
|---|---|---|
| Electric Arena: Public Image Ltd; Jónsi; Marc Almond; Black Mountain; Chew Lips; Nova Static | Electric Arena: LCD Soundsystem; Hot Chip; Bad Lieutenant; Crystal Castles; K’naan; Robyn; Spilly Walker; Channel One | Electric Arena: Fever Ray; UNKLE; Fat Freddy’s Drop; Two Door Cinema Club; Beardyman; Dam-Funk + Master Blazter; Neon Indian; Messiah J & the Expert |

| Friday 3 September | Saturday 4 September | Sunday 5 September |
|---|---|---|
| Crawdaddy Stage: Eels; Foals; Laura Marling; Hurts; Joe Echo; Cloud Castle Lake | Crawdaddy Stage: Gil Scott-Heron; Cathy Davey; Steve Earle; Paul Brady; Villagers; The Redneck Manifesto; Adrian Crowley; And So I Watch You from Afar; Goodtime John | Crawdaddy Stage: Wolf Parade; The Low Anthem; The Horrors; The Big Pink; Fight Like Apes; The Alarm; Stornoway; The Tallest Man on Earth; James Vincent McMorrow |

=== 2011 festival ===
Artists who played in 2011 included Arcade Fire, Pulp, The Chemical Brothers, Interpol, PJ Harvey, Beirut, Blonde Redhead, Zola Jesus, The Drums, Santigold, The Family Stone, Joan As Policewoman, Best Coast, 3epkano, Power of Dreams, Yuck, Foster The People, Alexandra Stan, The Undertones, Public Enemy, Jimmy Cliff, DJ Shadow, Flying Lotus, The Charlatans, Mogwai, Sinéad O'Connor, White Lies, OMD, Toots & the Maytals, Lykke Li, Midlake, The Rubberbandits, Death in Vegas, The Go! Team, Big Audio Dynamite, Boys Noize, Paul Kalkbrenner, Dave Clarke, Twin Shadow, Willy Mason, Trentemøller, Killing Joke, Health, Mundy, Gavin Friday, The Walkmen, Adam Beyer, Sharon Shannon, Ivan St. John, The Cast of Cheers, Micah P. Hinson, Caitlin Rose, The Potbelleez, Adebisi Shank, The Danger Is, Codes, And So I Watch You From Afar, and O Emperor.

The festival triumphed at the Irish Festival Awards, winning seven gongs, including Best Large Festival, Best Line up and Best Toilets.

The following tables list the scheduled acts by stage and day, ordered from the final scheduled set to the earliest. Other areas are not exhaustively listed.

| Friday 2 September | Saturday 3 September | Sunday 4 September |
|---|---|---|
| Main Stage: Interpol; PJ Harvey; Jimmy Cliff; Sinéad O’Connor; Willy Mason; The Lost Brothers | Main Stage: The Chemical Brothers; Arcade Fire; Lykke Li; James Blake; Toots & the Maytals; Republic of Loose; Donal Dineen’s Parish; 3epkano; Trinity Orchestra (Daft Punk) | Main Stage: Pulp; Underworld; Beirut; The Family Stone; The Unthanks; Gordon Gano & The Ryans; Dublin Gospel Choir |

| Friday 2 September | Saturday 3 September | Sunday 4 September |
|---|---|---|
| Electric Arena: DJ Shadow; Santigold; The Rapture; Sharon Corr; Little Green Cars; Funeral Suits | Electric Arena: Public Enemy; Death in Vegas; Orchestral Manoeuvres in the Dark; Jape; The Rubberbandits; Crazy P; Le Galaxie; Bitches with Wolves | Electric Arena: Mogwai; White Lies; Big Audio Dynamite; The Go! Team; The Japanese Popstars; Everything Everything; Oh Land; This Club; Somadrome |

| Friday 2 September | Saturday 3 September | Sunday 4 September |
|---|---|---|
| Crawdaddy Stage: The Charlatans; M. Ward; Warpaint; Cry Before Dawn; The Gandhis; Phil Cosby; Pick for the Picnic | Crawdaddy Stage: Trentemøller (live); Retarded Cop; Midlake; Mundy; Blonde Redhead; The Undertones; I Am Kloot; R.S.A.G.; Ghost Estates | Crawdaddy Stage: Clap Your Hands Say Yeah; Bob Geldof; The Drums; Sharon Shannon Big Band; Joan as Police Woman; James Vincent McMorrow; Gemma Hayes; O Emperor; Favourite Sons; The Kanyu Tree |

=== 2012 festival ===
Artists who performed at the 2012 festival included The Cure, The Killers, Elbow, Sigur Rós, Christy Moore, Orbital, Hot Chip, The xx, Wild Beasts, Of Monsters and Men, Patti Smith, The Roots, Crystal Castles, Grandaddy, SBTRKT, Mmoths, Metronomy, Bat for Lashes, The Maccabees, The Horrors, Richard Hawley, Azealia Banks, Ed Sheeran, The Jezabels, Michael Kiwanuka, Gavin Friday, Ryan Sheridan, Róisín O, Van Dyke Parks, Roots Manuva, Bell X1, Dublin Gospel Choir, Glen Hansard, Grizzly Bear, Willis Earl Beal, Alabama Shakes, Tindersticks, Fatoumata Diawara, Land Lovers, Eagle and the Worm, Solar Bears, Staff Benda Bilili, Little Roy, Lanterns on the Lake, Jonathan Wilson, Baxter Dury, Cranes, Milagres, In Tua Nua, Codes, Conor Linnie, Ocho and more to be announced.

The following tables reflect an archived, community-maintained timetable; the original running order should be checked against contemporary printed programmes. A separately confirmed cancellation is crossed out.

| Friday 31 August | Saturday 1 September | Sunday 2 September |
|---|---|---|
| Main Stage: Sigur Rós; The xx; Gavin Friday; Alabama Shakes; Kormac’s Big Band | Main Stage: Orbital; The Cure; Explosions in the Sky; Crystal Castles; Wild Beasts; Bellowhead; Trinity Orchestra | Main Stage: The Killers; Elbow; Bombay Bicycle Club; Michael Kiwanuka; Lee “Scratch” Perry & Max Romeo; Dublin Gospel Choir |

| Friday 31 August | Saturday 1 September | Sunday 2 September |
|---|---|---|
| Electric Arena: Ed Sheeran; The Vaccines; The Maccabees; Grizzly Bear; Grandaddy; Wonder Villains | Electric Arena: Squarepusher; The Roots; Villagers; Richard Hawley; SBTRKT; Dexys; God Is an Astronaut; Dry the River; Heathers | Electric Arena: Hot Chip; Bat for Lashes; Dakota 66; Ben Howard; Mick Flannery; Lianne La Havas; Ryan Sheridan; Milagres; The Riptide Movement |

| Friday 31 August | Saturday 1 September | Sunday 2 September |
|---|---|---|
| Bamboo Stage (Body & Soul): TR One; Lemonada; Forrests; Bantum; Ana Gog; Boy Lights Fire | Bamboo Stage (Body & Soul): Spam Chop; Metaphi / Metske; No Spill Blood; Glimmerman; Dott; TN Charm; Youth Mass; The Altered Hours; Róisín O | Bamboo Stage (Body & Soul): Space Dimension Controller; Sunken Foal; Replete; Tujacques; Cian Finn; Tradiohead; N. C. Lawlor; The Rant; Little Oak |

| Friday 31 August | Saturday 1 September | Sunday 2 September |
|---|---|---|
| Cosby Stage: ~~Azealia Banks~~ (cancelled) | Cosby Stage: | Cosby Stage: |

=== 2013 festival ===
The announcement of the 2013 festival was delayed significantly owing to a legal dispute regarding ownership of the festival between the festival's founder POD Concerts and its majority shareholder Festival Republic Dublin (FRD).

Despite fears that Electric Picnic would not return in 2013, Electric Picnic was subsequently scheduled to take place between 30 August and 1 September.

The initial line-up for the festival was announced on 25 April 2013 to much fanfare. The line-up included Björk, Fatboy Slim, Robert Plant, My Bloody Valentine, Arctic Monkeys, Franz Ferdinand, Wu-Tang Clan, David Byrne & St Vincent, Eels, Noah & The Whale, Johnny Marr, Disclosure, Ocean Colour Scene, Hurts, Mick Flannery, The Walkmen, Baauer, Tiga, Warpaint, Savages, The Strypes, Poliça, Chvrches, Parquet Courts, Clinic, Deap Vally and Soak.

The following tables list the scheduled acts by stage and day, ordered from the final scheduled set to the earliest. Other areas are not exhaustively listed.

| Friday 30 August | Saturday 31 August | Sunday 1 September |
|---|---|---|
| Main Stage: Fatboy Slim; My Bloody Valentine; Wu-Tang Clan; Miles Kane; Hudson Taylor | Main Stage: Disclosure; Two Door Cinema Club; Björk; Robert Plant’s Sensational Space Shifters; Ellie Goulding; The Duckworth Lewis Method; Ocean Colour Scene; The Beat | Main Stage: Arctic Monkeys; Franz Ferdinand; Eels; Kodaline; Noah and the Whale; Black Uhuru; Dublin Gospel Choir |

| Friday 30 August | Saturday 31 August | Sunday 1 September |
|---|---|---|
| Electric Arena: Giorgio Moroder; Ghostboy | Electric Arena: Tiga; Ryan Sheridan; Billy Bragg; The Walkmen; Little Green Cars; Cyril Hahn; Hurts; Sam Smith; Raglans | Electric Arena: The Knife; David Byrne & St. Vincent; Warpaint; Johnny Marr; The Strypes; Hermitage Green; MS MR; Nina Nesbitt |

| Friday 30 August | Saturday 31 August | Sunday 1 September |
|---|---|---|
| Body & Soul Main Stage: Skip & Die; Máirtín O’Connor; R.S.A.G.; Phantom; Lisa O’Neill; Last Days of 1984; Daithí; Slow Skies; The Eskies; The Donnies | Body & Soul Main Stage: Le Galaxie; HK119; Matthew E. White; Frida Sundemo; Samaris; The Dead Heavys; Ghosts; Mark Mulcahy; Come On Live Long; Swords; Band of Clouds | Body & Soul Main Stage: Tourist; Special Guest (unannounced); Josef Salvat; Fallulah; Ryan Vail; King Kong Company; John Smith; Overhead, the Albatross; Vann Music; I Have a Tribe |

=== 2014 festival ===
Electric Picnic 2014 took place at Stradbally from 29 to 31 August, attended by 41,000 people. Early bird tickets went on sale on 19 March 2014. A Full weekend ticket cost €154.50 for purchasers who could prove they had been to three or more picnics, €174.50 for those who could prove they had been to the picnic once or twice previously. Tickets then increased to €194.50 until 4 July and, €229.50 after that date. Sunday tickets were priced at €90. Sunday tickets had sold out by 13 June. Full weekend tickets sold out on 31 July

| Friday 29 August | Saturday 30 August | Sunday 31 August |
|---|---|---|
| Main Stage: Pet Shop Boys; Foals; Blondie; The Strypes; Tvvins | Main Stage: Chic; Portishead; Paolo Nutini; Bombay Bicycle club; Hozier; Wild Beasts; The Stranglers; Trinity Orchestra | Main Stage: OutKast; Beck; Lily Allen; Simple Minds; Sinéad O'Connor; The Wailers; Dublin Gospel Choir |

| Friday 29 August | Saturday 30 August | Sunday 31 August |
|---|---|---|
| Electric Arena: James Murphy | Electric Arena: SBTRKT; James Vincent McMorrow; London Grammar; Metronomy; Clean Bandit; We Cut Corners; Raglans; Daniel James | Electric Arena: Mogwai; Hercules And Love Affair; St Vincent; The 1975; Laura Mvula; Hamsandwich; Nick Mulvey; Orla Gartland |

| Friday 29 August | Saturday 30 August | Sunday 31 August |
|---|---|---|
| Body & Soul (Main Stage): Oum Shatt; Young Fathers; Tune-yards; Lau; The Altered Hours; Sounds of system breakdown; The Viking Project; Sleep Thieves | Body & Soul (Main Stage): Donal Dineen; Moodoid; Kate Boy; Linkoban; Buffalo Woman; Meltybrains?; Alice Boman; Malcom London; Interskalactic; Youth Mass; Mongoose; Susan O Llien and the low standards; Arioso | Body & Soul (Main Stage): Special Guests; Francois and the Atlas Mountains; Perfume Genius; Glass Animals; Tommy KD; Olof Arnalds; I have a tribe; Dermot Byrne, Floriane Blancke & Brendan O'Regan; Jon Gomm; Join me in the pines; Ronan O Snodaigh and the occasionals; Loah; Grounds for Invasion; Grouse |

| Friday 29 August | Saturday 30 August | Sunday 31 August |
|---|---|---|
| Rankin's Wood stage: N/A | Rankin's Wood stage: Le Galaxie; Omar Souleyman; Annie Mac; Walking on Cars; Cathy Davey; Twin Shadow; Vann Music; Booka brass band | Rankin's Wood stage: The Minutes; Kelis; Flume; Jungle; Neneh Cherry; Stephen Malkmus; Jenny Lewis; Acrobat |

| Friday 29 August | Saturday 30 August | Sunday 31 August |
|---|---|---|
| Cosby Tent: N/A | Cosby Tent: BP Fallon and the Ghost Wolves; The Blades; White Denim; Temples; The Orwells; Benjamin Booker; Sheppard; Wyvern Lingo | Cosby Tent: Slowdive; The Horrors; Asgeir; Wolf Alice; Drenge; Unknown Mortal Orchestra; The Districts; Vancouver Sleep Clinic; The Whereabouts; Matt McGinn |

| Friday 29 August | Saturday 30 August | Sunday 31 August |
|---|---|---|
| Little Big Tent: N/A | Little Big Tent: Bicep; Krystal Klear; Kaytranada; SOHN; FKA Twigs; John Wizards; Phox; Sleep Thieves; Spies; The Academic; Buffalo Sunn | Little Big Tent: Shit robot; Rustie; Duke Dumont; Sampha; Vaults; Glass Animals; Moko; Seinabo Sey; Nightbox |

=== 2015 festival ===
Electric Picnic 2015 took place at Stradbally from 4 to 6 September. The first acts were announced in March 2015. There was speculation that the capacity would be raised from the present 42,000 to 47,000 to cater for increased demand. The headliners were Sam Smith, Blur, and Florence and the Machine.

The following tables list the scheduled acts by stage and day, ordered from the final scheduled set to the earliest. Other areas are not exhaustively listed.

| Friday 4 September | Saturday 5 September | Sunday 6 September |
|---|---|---|
| Main Stage: Underworld; Grace Jones; The Coronas; HamsandwicH | Main Stage: Blur; Sam Smith; Hot Chip; George Ezra; Future Islands; The Riptide Movement; Bry; Yurodny | Main Stage: Florence and the Machine; Manic Street Preachers; Interpol; The Boomtown Rats; Jurassic 5; Legend; Dublin Gospel Choir |

| Friday 4 September | Saturday 5 September | Sunday 6 September |
|---|---|---|
| Electric Arena: Belle and Sebastian; My Morning Jacket; Dawes | Electric Arena: Róisín Murphy; Chvrches; The War on Drugs; Mac DeMarco; Printer Clips; Little Hours; Race the Flux | Electric Arena: Tame Impala; FKA twigs; Villagers; Django Django; Jape; Pond; Wyvern Lingo |

| Friday 4 September | Saturday 5 September | Sunday 6 September |
|---|---|---|
| Rankin’s Wood: Ride | Rankin’s Wood: Jon Hopkins; Yasiin Bey; Battles; The Staves; SOAK; Declan McKenna; We Cut Corners | Rankin’s Wood: Le Galaxie; Paul Kalkbrenner; MK; Gavin James; MS MR; Thomston; Here We Go Magic |

=== 2016 festival ===
Electric Picnic 2016 took place from 2 to 4 September. It was headlined by LCD Soundsystem, Lana Del Rey, The Chemical Brothers, New Order and Noel Gallagher's High Flying Birds.

The following tables list the scheduled acts by stage and day, ordered from the final scheduled set to the earliest. Other areas are not exhaustively listed.

| Friday 2 September | Saturday 3 September | Sunday 4 September |
|---|---|---|
| Main Stage: The Chemical Brothers; The 1975; Nas; ABC; Ryan Sheridan | Main Stage: LCD Soundsystem; Noel Gallagher's High Flying Birds; Bell X1; Catfish and the Bottlemen; Gavin James; The Lightning Seeds; Hermitage Green; Trinity Orchestra | Main Stage: Lana Del Rey; New Order; Nathaniel Rateliff & the Night Sweats; James Bay; Local Natives; Toots and the Maytals; Dublin Gospel Choir |

| Friday 2 September | Saturday 3 September | Sunday 4 September |
|---|---|---|
| Electric Arena: Super Furry Animals; Todd Terje; Broken Social Scene | Electric Arena: Years & Years; The Shins; The Avett Brothers; Jack Garratt; Walking on Cars; Lindsey Stirling; Wyvern Lingo; Neon Wolf | Electric Arena: Skepta; Bat for Lashes; Wolf Alice; Wild Beasts; Editors; Aurora; CC Brez |

| Friday 2 September | Saturday 3 September | Sunday 4 September |
|---|---|---|
| Rankin’s Wood: Dave Treacy (DJ set); Jenny Greene and RTÉ Concert Orchestra; Mo-K (DJ set) | Rankin’s Wood: John Talabot; DJ EZ; Joey Bada$$; Glass Animals; Rejjie Snow; Girls Names; Brian Deady; Eve Belle | Rankin’s Wood: District 8 DJs; Adam Beyer; Animal Collective; Savages; Gorgon City; Picture This; Sample Answer |

=== 2017 festival ===
Electric Picnic 2017 took place on 1–3 September. It was headlined by Duran Duran, A Tribe Called Quest and The xx.

The following tables list the scheduled acts by stage and day, ordered from the final scheduled set to the earliest. Other areas are not exhaustively listed.

| Friday 1 September | Saturday 2 September | Sunday 3 September |
|---|---|---|
| Main Stage: The xx; London Grammar; The Divine Comedy; Hudson Taylor; Little Hours | Main Stage: Pete Tong; A Tribe Called Quest; Phoenix; Run the Jewels; Madness; Giggs; The Strypes; Keywest | Main Stage: Duran Duran; Elbow; Chaka Khan; The Pretenders; Rag’n’Bone Man; The Skatalites; Dublin Gospel Choir |

| Friday 1 September | Saturday 2 September | Sunday 3 September |
|---|---|---|
| Rankin’s Wood: Jenny Greene with RTÉ Concert Orchestra; DJ Mo-K with RTÉ Concert Orchestra | Rankin’s Wood: Le Galaxie; Floating Points; All Tvvins; Rusangano Family; The Riptide Movement; Otherkin; Bad Bones; Jafaris | Rankin’s Wood: Kiasmos; Tale of Us; Mano Le Tough; Hannah Wants; Krept and Konan; Section Boyz; Fangclub; Pale Rivers |

| Friday 1 September | Saturday 2 September | Sunday 3 September |
|---|---|---|
| Body & Soul Main Stage: New Jackson; Lowly; HMLTD; Ships; Shookrah; Mythill Grim; New Valley Wolves; Telephone Explosions; Bob Skeleton | Body & Soul Main Stage: Le Boom; Sweat; Public Service Broadcasting; Soulé; Everything Shook; Elaine Mai; Frankenstein Bolts; Youth Mass; Laurie Shaw; Oh Joy; Bennett Bay; Field Trip; The Innocent Bystander; Inishowen Gospel Choir | Body & Soul Main Stage: This Ain’t No Disco with Donal Dineen; BARQ; TooFools; IDER; Moses Sumney; Aldous Harding; Nick Hakim; Klark Cant; David Keenan |

=== 2018 festival ===
Electric Picnic 2018 took place at Stradbally from 31 August to 2 September. Tickets for the festival sold-out in less than 24 hours after the lineup was announced in March 2018.

The following tables list the scheduled acts by stage and day, ordered from the final scheduled set to the earliest. Other areas are not exhaustively listed.

| Friday 31 August | Saturday 1 September | Sunday 2 September |
|---|---|---|
| Main Stage: Kendrick Lamar; Walking on Cars; Chvrches; Ash; Brand New Friend | Main Stage: Massive Attack; N.E.R.D.; Dua Lipa; Gavin James; Mavis Staples; Gomez; Hudson Taylor | Main Stage: The Prodigy; Picture This; George Ezra; Nile Rodgers and Chic; Garbage; Inner Circle; Dublin Gospel Choir |

| Friday 31 August | Saturday 1 September | Sunday 2 September |
|---|---|---|
| Rankin’s Wood: 2FM Live: The Story of Hip Hop (Part 3) | Rankin’s Wood: Nina Kraviz; King Krule; Mount Kimbie; Tom Misch; Dermot Kennedy; Maggie Rogers; Mik Pyro; Laoise | Rankin’s Wood: DJ Koze; Death Grips; The Blaze; Denis Sulta; Stefflon Don; Wild Youth; Columbia Mills |

| Friday 31 August | Saturday 1 September | Sunday 2 September |
|---|---|---|
| Body & Soul Main Stage: Bon Voyage; Bitch Falcon; Super Extra Bonus Party; Bad Bones; The Brummies; Roe; Paddy Hanna; Hvmmingbyrd | Body & Soul Main Stage: Youngr; Ryan Vail; Gundelach; Halo Maud; The Modern Strangers; Laoise; Pillow Queens; Lilla Vargen; O Emperor; Slow Place Like Home; Tracy Bruen; The Blue Notes | Body & Soul Main Stage: Daithí; R.S.A.G.; Hak Baker; Soulé; Ruby Empress; Fontaines D.C.; David Keenan; James Canty; BARQ; Oscar Jerome; Sleep Thieves; Orchic Collective |

=== 2019 festival ===
Electric Picnic 2019 took place at Stradbally from 30 August to 1 September.

The following tables list the scheduled acts by stage and day, ordered from the final scheduled set to the earliest. Other areas are not exhaustively listed.

| Friday 30 August | Saturday 31 August | Sunday 1 September |
|---|---|---|
| Main Stage: Hozier; Dermot Kennedy; Billie Eilish; David Keenan | Main Stage: The Strokes; The 1975; Christine and the Queens; Gerry Cinnamon; Years & Years; Wild Youth; The Riptide Movement | Main Stage: Florence and the Machine; Kodaline; Richard Ashcroft; Jess Glynne; Razorlight; SOJA; Dublin Gospel Choir |

| Friday 30 August | Saturday 31 August | Sunday 1 September |
|---|---|---|
| Electric Arena: James Blake; Jarvis Cocker (JARV IS...); Miles Kane; Toucan | Electric Arena: Four Tet; Richie Hawtin; Metronomy; Charli XCX; Freya Ridings; Otherkin; Lyra; Aimée | Electric Arena: The Streets; J Hus; Róisín Murphy; Johnny Marr; Sam Fender; King Kong Company; Fangclub |

| Friday 30 August | Saturday 31 August | Sunday 1 September |
|---|---|---|
| Three Made by Music Stage: Shura; Serpentwithfeet; Sports Team; Alex Gough; Curtis Walsh | Three Made by Music Stage: JyellowL; Three Made by Music; Easy Life; White Reaper; The Scratch; Just Mustard; Working Men’s Club; Somebody’s Child; Rob de Boer; Uly | Three Made by Music Stage: Kero Kero Bonito; IDER; Let’s Eat Grandma; Georgia; Cassia; Heavy Lungs; Powpig; Yonaka; Sinéad O’Brien |

=== 2020 festival ===
The 2020 event was cancelled due to the COVID-19 pandemic.

=== 2021 festival ===
The 2021 event was cancelled due to the COVID-19 pandemic.

=== 2022 festival ===
Electric Picnic 2022 took place at Stradbally from 2 to 4 September after a gap of two years. Dermot Kennedy, Tame Impala and the Arctic Monkeys headlined the festival. Almost 70,000 people attended the event.

The HSE issued a drug warning to festivalgoers after "high strength" MDMA with two times the average dose was found. An anonymous drug testing facility was set up at the festival for the first time.

The following tables list the scheduled musical acts by stage and day, ordered from the last set to the earliest.

| Friday 2 September | Saturday 3 September | Sunday 4 September |
|---|---|---|
| Main Stage: Dermot Kennedy; Megan Thee Stallion; Glass Animals; Denise Chaila | Main Stage: Tame Impala; Picture This; The Kooks; Anne-Marie; Becky Hill; Hermitage Green; Hudson Taylor | Main Stage: Arctic Monkeys; Snow Patrol; The Coronas; The Academic; Wild Youth; My Therapist Ghosted Me; Dublin Gospel Choir |

| Friday 2 September | Saturday 3 September | Sunday 4 September |
|---|---|---|
| Electric Arena: Fontaines D.C.; Pixies; Willow; Bright Eyes | Electric Arena: Annie Mac; Wolf Alice; King Kong Company; Declan McKenna; The 2 Johnnies; Lyra; Sam Tompkins; Cian Ducrot | Electric Arena: Disclosure; London Grammar; James Vincent McMorrow; Mimi Webb; Belters Only; Moncrieff; Lea Heart |

| Friday 2 September | Saturday 3 September | Sunday 4 September |
|---|---|---|
| Rankin's Wood: Fred again..; Little Simz; Girl in Red; 100 gecs | Rankin's Wood: For Those I Love; Rina Sawayama; The Scratch; JPEGMAFIA; Kojaque; Kneecap; Lisa McHugh | Rankin's Wood: Khruangbin; Rejjie Snow; Joy Crookes; Griff; CMAT; Tolü Makay; The Florentinas |

| Friday 2 September | Saturday 3 September | Sunday 4 September |
|---|---|---|
| Terminus Stage: Mall Grab; Rebūke; Anfisa Letyago; Efa O’Neill | Terminus Stage: Kettama; blk.; Obskür; EVE | Terminus Stage: Jeff Mills; Helena Hauff; VTSS; Whorskey |

| Friday 2 September | Saturday 3 September | Sunday 4 September |
|---|---|---|
| Three All for Music Stage: Gang of Youths; Gus Dapperton; Lime Cordiale; Q | Three All for Music Stage: Sleaford Mods; Saint Sister; Orla Gartland; Gemma Dunleavy; Yeule; Thomas Headon; CVC; Narolane & Guests | Three All for Music Stage: Perfume Genius; Just Mustard; Priya Ragu; Kamal; Hope Tala; Kynsy; Bronagh Gallagher |

=== 2023 festival ===
Electric Picnic 2023 took place at Stradbally from 1 to 3 September. Billie Eilish, Fred Again and The Killers headline the festival.

The following tables list the scheduled musical acts by stage and day, ordered from the last set to the earliest.

| Friday 1 September | Saturday 2 September | Sunday 3 September |
|---|---|---|
| Main Stage: Billie Eilish; Niall Horan; King Kong Company; Kingfishr | Main Stage: Fred again..; Paolo Nutini; ~~Lewis Capaldi~~ (cancelled); Tom Odell; Mimi Webb; Cian Ducrot; Pa Sheehy; Brad Heidi | Main Stage: The Killers; The Script; Gavin James; Rick Astley; Lyra; Women in Harmony; Glória LGBT+ Choir |

| Friday 1 September | Saturday 2 September | Sunday 3 September |
|---|---|---|
| Electric Arena: Belters Only; Steve Lacy; Wet Leg; Jazzy | Electric Arena: The Coronas; IDLES; Inhaler; Johnny Marr; The Academic; Nessa Barrett; Ispíní na hÉireann; Dylan John Thomas | Electric Arena: Jamie xx; blk.; The Saw Doctors; The Wolfe Tones; Fight Like Apes; The Lightning Seeds; milk. |

| Friday 1 September | Saturday 2 September | Sunday 3 September |
|---|---|---|
| Rankin's Wood: Young Fathers; Nia Archives; Bakar; MUNA | Rankin's Wood: Loyle Carner; Dec Pierce Block Rockin’ Beats; Lovejoy; Maverick Sabre; HamSandwich; Jamie Webster; Robert Grace | Rankin's Wood: Overmono; Confidence Man; Holly Humberstone; The Mary Wallopers; Selló; Ryan Mack; Katy Kirby |

| Friday 1 September | Saturday 2 September | Sunday 3 September |
|---|---|---|
| Terminus Stage: I Hate Models; 999999999; Southstar; ANSBRO | Terminus Stage: Fionn Curran; Interplanetary Criminal; IMNOTYOURMATE; Yasmin Gardezi | Terminus Stage: Skin On Skin; Charlie Sparks; TRYM; Hannah Laing |

| Friday 1 September | Saturday 2 September | Sunday 3 September |
|---|---|---|
| Three Music Stage: Viagra Boys; The Murder Capital; Anna of the North; Hannah Grae | Three Music Stage: Unknown Mortal Orchestra; Chasing Abbey; COIN; Mae Stephens; Nell Mescal; The Last Dinner Party; JULIE; Three City Stages Collective | Three Music Stage: Amyl and the Sniffers; Snail Mail; Ethel Cain; Samia; Royel Otis; Chalk; Debbie; Gurriers |

=== 2024 festival ===
Electric Picnic 2024 took place two weeks earlier than the traditional dates, from 16 to 18 August. The planned dates were not well received by local farmers, who cited issues with the festival taking place in the middle of harvest season. Festival director Melvin Benn stated the change was a once-off for 2024 to facilitate a particular artist.

The lineup was met with widespread negative criticism on social media, primarily due to the headlining acts being perceived as less popular and relevant compared to those featured in previous years.

A controversy arose over greenwashing at the event – David Walsh-Kemmis, owner of Ballykilcavan Brewery, which is situated 2.5 km from the festival, complained that "It's extremely disheartening to see Electric Picnic, a festival that prides itself on supporting local culture and sustainability, completely stonewall us. Supplying this festival would make a significant positive impact on our small business, securing local jobs, creating temporary positions, and boosting the local economy." Instead of using local Irish breweries, the festival signed an exclusive deal with Heineken, brewed in Cork. Melvin Benn was quoted in media as saying that he had tasted Ballykilcavan's beers, and didn't like them, so wouldn't sell them.

The following tables list the scheduled musical acts by stage and day, ordered from the last set to the earliest.

| Friday 16 August | Saturday 17 August | Sunday 18 August |
|---|---|---|
| Main Stage: Noah Kahan; Gerry Cinnamon; Sophie Ellis-Bextor; Jazzy | Main Stage: Calvin Harris; Kodaline; Kasabian; The Saw Doctors; The Mary Wallopers; Somebody’s Child; Chasing Abbey | Main Stage: Kylie Minogue; Raye; Tom Grennan; The Wolfe Tones; David Kushner; The Stranglers; Glória LGBT+ Choir |

| Friday 16 August | Saturday 17 August | Sunday 18 August |
|---|---|---|
| Electric Arena: Faithless; Nas; Ethel Cain; Ryan McMullan | Electric Arena: Lankum; J Hus; The Waterboys; Kneecap; Moncrieff; Amble; Dylan Flynn & the Dead Poets; WineMom | Electric Arena: Peggy Gou; Damien Dempsey; CMAT; Teddy Swims; Dean Lewis (with Picture This); Darren Kiely; Florence Road |

| Friday 16 August | Saturday 17 August | Sunday 18 August |
|---|---|---|
| Rankin's Wood: Villagers; Kojaque; Jessie Murph; Good Neighbours | Rankin's Wood: The Scratch; Channel Tres; Loreen; Dasha; 49th & Main; Blindboy; The Clockworks | Rankin's Wood: Hermitage Green; Berlioz (DJ); The Teskey Brothers; Del Water Gap; Artemas; Bambie Thug; Soft Launch; The Psychs |

| Friday 16 August | Saturday 17 August | Sunday 18 August |
|---|---|---|
| Terminus Stage: Skin On Skin; X Club; Prozak; Datsko | Terminus Stage: Dyen; Funk Tribu; Luciiid; Black Traffic; 666cmg | Terminus Stage: Hannah Laing; Tommy Holohan (replacement); ~~HorsegiirL~~ (cancelled); La La; Shee |

| Friday 16 August | Saturday 17 August | Sunday 18 August |
|---|---|---|
| Three Music Stage: NewDad; Odhran Murphy; Dug | Three Music Stage: Jordan Adetunji; Jalen Ngonda; Daydreamers; Cardinals; Big Sleep; Cliffords; Three Music Slot | Three Music Stage: Thee Sacred Souls; Zimmer90; Nieve Ella; Bricknasty; Spiritual Cramp; Spider |

=== 2025 festival ===
Electric Picnic 2025 took place at Stradbally Hall from 29 to 31 August 2025. The Friday Main Stage was headlined by Hozier, with Chappell Roan also performing. Sam Fender and Fatboy Slim topped the Saturday programme, while Kings of Leon closed the Main Stage on Sunday.

The following tables list scheduled acts by stage and day. Smaller stages are not exhaustively listed.

| Friday 29 August | Saturday 30 August | Sunday 31 August |
|---|---|---|
| Main Stage: Hozier; Chappell Roan; Conan Gray | Main Stage: Fatboy Slim; Sam Fender; Nile Rodgers and Chic; Inhaler; Amble; Kneecap; Aaron Rowe | Main Stage: Kings of Leon; Becky Hill; Kingfishr; David Gray; Noel and Mike Hogan (The Cranberries) with the RTÉ Orchestra; Timahoe Choir |

| Friday 29 August | Saturday 30 August | Sunday 31 August |
|---|---|---|
| Electric Arena: Barry Can't Swim (live); The Saw Doctors; The Academic; Luvcat | Electric Arena: The Coronas; Mark McCabe; The 2 Johnnies; Tommy Cash; Maverick Sabre; KhakiKid; Just Mustard; Blair Davie | Electric Arena: Ewan McVicar; The Kooks; Jazzy; King Kong Company; I'm Grand Mam; Biig Piig; Esmeralda Road |

| Friday 29 August | Saturday 30 August | Sunday 31 August |
|---|---|---|
| 3Music Stage: Confidence Man; Self Esteem; Suki Waterhouse; Alessi Rose | 3Music Stage: Maribou State; Lord Huron; For Those I Love; Black Country, New Road; Joost; Hilltop Hoods; Nofun! | 3Music Stage: Bell X1; Viagra Boys; Marc Rebillet; Montell Fish; Orla Gartland; Arthur Hill; Mundy; Sunday (1994) |

| Friday 29 August | Saturday 30 August | Sunday 31 August |
|---|---|---|
| Terminus: Azyr; Holy Priest; Mark Blair; Kirk | Terminus: Horsegiirl; Sim0ne; Pretty Girl; Juicy Romance; Puzzy Wrangler | Terminus: DJ Heartstring; Girls Don't Sync; Tara Casey |

| Friday 29 August | Saturday 30 August | Sunday 31 August |
|---|---|---|
| Fish Town: Decks N Drums (The Kilo 1977 and R.S.A.G.); Jerry Fish, Maykay and Terri Fierce; Meryl Streek; The Sleeveens; Fizzy Orange; The Donnys; Molly Vulpyne Band; Worn Out; Sweets; Banyah; Will De Burca | Fish Town: Trad Rave; R.S.A.G.; The Frank and Walters; Shosby; Delush; The Love Buzz; David Geraghty; Hypnic Jerk; The Prongs; Vulture Fun | Fish Town: The Savage Heart; Junior Brother; Regina and the Queens; The Year Grunge Broke; Simple Things; Pontious Pilate & the Naildrivers; The Western Wheels |

| Friday 29 August | Saturday 30 August | Sunday 31 August |
|---|---|---|
| Salty Dog: | Salty Dog: ~~Fatboy Slim (unannounced set)~~ | Salty Dog: |

=== 2026 festival ===
Electric Picnic 2026 took place at Stradbally Hall from 28 to 30 August 2026. Lewis Capaldi headlined the Main Stage on Friday, Gorillaz on Saturday and Fontaines D.C. on Sunday. Other Main Stage performers included Zara Larsson, CMAT, The Mary Wallopers, Van Morrison and The Saw Doctors.

The following tables list scheduled acts by stage and day. Smaller stages are not exhaustively listed.

| Friday 28 August | Saturday 29 August | Sunday 30 August |
|---|---|---|
| Main Stage: Lewis Capaldi; Sombr; Zara Larsson; Jade | Main Stage: Gorillaz; CMAT; The Mary Wallopers; Role Model; City Stages featuring Tinie Tempah | Main Stage: Fontaines D.C.; Amble; Djo; The Saw Doctors; Van Morrison; James Marriott; RTÉ Céilí Mór |

| Friday 28 August | Saturday 29 August | Sunday 30 August |
|---|---|---|
| Electric Arena: Ben Hemsley; Wolf Alice; Wunderhorse; Gurriers | Electric Arena: Duke Dumont - (Cancelled Early Due to Overcrowding); Interplanetary Criminal; Damien Dempsey; The Stunning; Kyla Cobbler; The Undertones; Jessie Murph; Violet Grohl | Electric Arena: Obskür; Skepta; Mick Flannery; Skye Newman; Florence Road; Rose Gray; People I've Met |

| Friday 28 August | Saturday 29 August | Sunday 30 August |
|---|---|---|
| Rankin's Wood: Loyle Carner; JPEGMAFIA; Men I Trust; Darren Kiely | Rankin's Wood: The Scratch; The Academic; Oklou; Aaron Rowe; Audrey Hobert; Cliffords; Nieve Ella | Rankin's Wood: Hermitage Green; Geese; Ravyn Lenae; Adéla; Madra Salach; Tyler Ballgame; Keo; Bleech 9:3 |

| Friday 28 August | Saturday 29 August | Sunday 30 August |
|---|---|---|
| Red Bull × Terminus: X Club; Dart; Faster Horses | Red Bull × Terminus: Belters Only; Clouds; Twofaced; Kayleigh Glynn; ETC | Red Bull × Terminus: Malugi; Effy; CamrinWatsin; Derv |

| Friday 28 August | Saturday 29 August | Sunday 30 August |
|---|---|---|
| Smirnoff Stage: ~~Armand van Helden~~ | Smirnoff Stage: | Smirnoff Stage: |

| Friday 28 August | Saturday 29 August | Sunday 30 August |
|---|---|---|
| Rockshore Live: Shee; NewDad; Basht.; Brooki; Big Sleep; Sarah Crean | Rockshore Live: Le Boom; F3MIII; Cruel Sister; Skagaboo + Friends; Sell Everything; Jamie McIntyre; Anna Leah; Kapayja; Aifric; SMO | Rockshore Live: Sally C; Deathtoricky; Bricknasty; Cardinals; Black Nylon; Tooth; Theatre; Babyrat; Maicín; Burglar |

== See also ==
- List of electronic music festivals
- Longitude Festival
- Oxegen
- Leeds and Reading Festivals
