= List of best-selling singles and albums of 2010 in Ireland =

This is a list of the best selling singles, albums and as according to IRMA. Further listings can be found here.

== Top-selling singles ==
1. "When We Collide" – Matt Cardle
2. "Under Pressure (Ice Ice Baby)" – Jedward featuring Vanilla Ice
3. "Horse Outside" – Rubberbandits
4. "Love the Way You Lie" – Eminem featuring Rihanna
5. "Only Girl (In the World)" – Rihanna
6. "Just the Way You Are" – Bruno Mars
7. "Fireflies" – Owl City
8. "Telephone" – Lady Gaga featuring Beyoncé
9. "Firework" – Katy Perry
10. "California Gurls" – Katy Perry featuring Snoop Dogg

== Top-selling albums ==
1. Science & Faith – The Script
2. Progress – Take That
3. Crazy Love – Michael Bublé
4. Loud - Rihanna
5. The Fame/The Fame Monster – Lady Gaga
6. Sigh No More – Mumford & Sons
7. Sunny Side Up – Paolo Nutini
8. Lungs – Florence & The Machine
9. My World – Justin Bieber
10. Glee: The Music, Volume 1 - Glee Cast

Notes:

- *Compilation albums are not included.
