= JC's =

Irish supermarket

- Industry: Supermarket
- Headquarters: Swords, Ireland
- Parent: Dunnes Stores

JC's is a formerly independent supermarket located in Swords, County Dublin, Ireland. The supermarket was purchased by Dunnes Stores (which operates a supermarket next door) in 2019 from the Savage family. Despite the acquisition by its neighbour, it continues to use the JC's brand.

The supermarket was opened in 1977 by JC Savage, who died in 2010.

Satirist Dave Chambers, member of The Rubberbandits, is known to wear a JC's plastic shopping bag on his head.

The supermarket was a subject of the RTÉ show, Feargal Quinn's Retail Therapy, hosted by the former Superquinn founder.
