= Matt McGinn =

Matt McGinn may refer to:

- Matt McGinn (Scottish songwriter) (1928–1977), Scottish folk singer-songwriter, actor, author and poet
- Matt McGinn (Irish songwriter) (born 1978), Northern Irish singer/songwriter, producer, multi-instrumentalist and arranger
- Matt McGinn (American songwriter), Nashville-based songwriter and producer
- Matt McGinn, guitarist with the English band Rosita, also a roadie for Kenickie and Coldplay and author of a book about life on the road with the latter.
