= St Oswald's Well =

There are a number of holy wells dedicated to St Oswald.

These include:

- St Oswald's Well, Durham
- St Oswald's Well, Great Ayton, North Yorkshire
- St Oswald's Well, Kirkoswald, Cumbria
- St Oswald's Well, Oswestry, Shropshire
- St Oswald's Well, Hermitage Green, Cheshire.
