= King Kong Company =

Irish dance band

- Origin: Waterford, Ireland
- Genre: Electronica
- Years active: 1996–2000; 2011–present
- Members: Bob McGlynn; Mark White; Colin Hoye; Trish Murphy; Tom Stapleton; Aaron Mulhall; Owen Corrigan
- Past members: Alan Aylward; Hazel Downes; Kevin O'Shanahan; Mark Graham; John Loftus

King Kong Company is an Irish dance band based in Waterford in Ireland. Although most of the members are not from Waterford, they met while attending Waterford Institute of Technology. In June 2016 they released their self-titled debut album.

== Overview ==
King Kong Company was conceived when two college friends, Alan Aylward and Mark White began experimenting with dance music using effect laden guitars and drum machines. They recruited college friends and expanded into a five-piece. King Kong Company recorded a session for Dave Fanning on RTÉ 2fm, and despite having some of their tracks edited, they were announced as the most popular radio session for that year. King Kong Company played at Ireland's first dance festival, Homelands. Other artists on the bill included Underworld, Orbital and Paul Oakenfold. The band split after finishing college in Waterford Institute of Technology.

In 2011 the band reformed with the idea of producing one new music video every month. Before the band played a gig, the video for Acetate won the Viewers Choice Award at the Irish Music TV Awards in 2011. The popularity of the videos resulted in the band playing a one off sold-out gig at The Forum in Waterford in 2012. This resulted in subsequent festival offers including Life Festival, Body & Soul and Electric Picnic. Their first international gigs followed in the United Kingdom in 2014.

They released their debut self-titled album in June 2016. The album was produced by Neil McLellen and was well received in the Irish media. The album reached the top 10 in the Irish Albums Chart.

In September 2016 they were nominated for two awards at the Pure M Awards. The first nomination was for Best Live Act where the other nominees included Hermitage Green, The Strypes and Aslan. The second nomination was for Best Music Video for 'Scarity Dan'. King Kong Company won the Best Live Act award.

In November 2016 the band's debut album made the Choice Music Prize long list. Other nominees included All Twins, September Girls, Bell X1, Katie Kim and Two Door Cinema Club.

In January 2017 King Kong Company played their first mainland Europe gigs in the Netherlands. On 28 February, their debut album was released in the Netherlands to positive reviews.

In April 2017 it was announced that King Kong Company would play the Silver Hayes stage at Glastonbury Festival for the first time in June, they followed this up with gigs at Boomtown, Beautiful Days, Amsterdam Dance Event and their largest ever gig in front of 10,000 people at Electric Picnic. The band were also invited to play for a specially invited audience with the President of Ireland Michael D. Higgins in July 2017. In October 2017 they played their biggest headline show when they sold out the 1,250 capacity Cork Opera House.

In 2018 the band announced a headline gig at 1,600 capacity Olympia Theatre in Dublin in October. In June they released a mini-documentary 'One Small Little Thing To Do' about their 12-hour trip from the stage of Body & Soul to the stage of Glastonbury, a journey undertaken the previous June. July saw the release of the band's most critically acclaimed single My Name Is Now. In August the band were added to the line up for Electric Picnic

In 2023 the band released the brand new single "The Machine", featuring top YouTube diorama artist Bobby Fingers. Following the release, the band played their biggest show to date, performing on mainstage at Electric Picnic. This was the culmination of playing at the festival for ten consecutive years.

=== Commotion Lotion ===
In June 2017 the band released their own beer called Commotion Lotion. The beer is infused with Buckfast, a tonic wine that features in the band's live show and in lyrics, as well as strawberries, raspberries and pineapple. The beer was produced by YellowBelly Beer, a craft brewery based in Wexford, Ireland. The beer has received mostly positive reviews with a 3.5 rating on beer review site Untapped.

== Members ==
Current

- Bob McGlynn - Lead Singer (No information)
- Mark White – bass guitar (1996–2000, 2011–present)
- Colin Hoye – trumpet (1996–2000, 2011–present)
- Tom Stapleton – keyboard (1996–2000, 2011–present)
- Trish Murphy – Dancer & Choreography (2011–present)
- Aaron Mulhall – Drums (2021–present)
- Owen Corrigan – Guitar (2022–present)

Former

- Hazel Downes – Dancer & Choreography (1996–2000)
- Kevin O'Shanahan – drums, percussion (1996–1998)
- Mark Graham – Lead vocals, drums, percussion (1998–2000, 2011–2021)
- Alan Aylward – guitar (1996–2000, 2011–2022)
- Lofty – Artist & VJ (2011–2018)

== Discography ==
King Kong Company discography
- Studio albums: 1
- Singles: 1
- Music videos: 13

=== Studio albums ===
Year	Album details	Peak chart positions
Year	Album details	IRL
2016	King Kong Company: Released: 17 June 2016; Label: Self Released; Formats: CD, digital download	45
"—" denotes a title that did not chart.

=== Singles ===
Year	Title	Peak chart positions		Album
Year	Title	IRL	UK	Album
2016	"Scarity Dan"	—	—	King Kong Company
"—" denotes a title that did not chart.

=== Music videos ===
Year	Title	Director	Album
2011	"Dr. Whom"	Lofty	King Kong Company
2011	"Acetate"	Lofty	King Kong Company
2011	"Uncle Trouble"	Lofty	King Kong Company
2011	"Damn You Dorothy"	Lofty	King Kong Company
2011	"Zoids	Lofty	King Kong Company
2011	"Panic Button"	Lofty	King Kong Company
2011	"I Said Posse!	Lofty	King Kong Company
2011	"Cannibal Country	Lofty	King Kong Company
2012	"Eamonn Devalero"	Lofty	King Kong Company
2012	"One of These Days	Alan Aylward	King Kong Company
2012	"BagPuss	Alan Aylward	King Kong Company
2015	SpaceHopper	Lofty	King Kong Company
2016	Scarity Dan	Jamie O'Rourke	King Kong Company
2023	The Machine	Shane Serrano	
