= Serious About Men =

Studio album by The Rubberbandits
- Released: December 2, 2011
- Genre: Comedy, rap
- Length: 83:14
- Label: Lovely Men

Singles from Serious About Men
- 1. "Horse Outside" Released: December 8, 2010; 2. "I Wanna Fight Your Father" Released: February 25, 2011; 3. "Spastic Hawk" Released: October 5, 2011; 4. "Black Man" Released: November 14, 2011

Serious About Men is the debut double album by comedy hip-hop duo The Rubberbandits, released on December 2, 2011 by Lovely Men Records. The album was produced by the group's unofficial third member, Willie O'DJ."".

Serious About Men peaked at number 16 on the Irish Albums Chart in its first week of release, despite strong pre-orders. The album contains songs from the band that are typical of their satirical, crude and surreal humor and explores numerous themes relating to Irish urban youth such as drug abuse, interactions with the Garda Síochána, and violence.

== Themes and lyrics ==
The first track from the album, "Bag of Glue", is a comedy song that previously appeared on their EP Horse Outside. It describes one of The Rubberbandits being seduced by "a big fat bird" and he needs to sniff bags of glue to feel okay with having sex with her. Sniffing glue is a habit typical of urban youth to achieve a short high. The second track, "Pure Awkward", describes their interaction with several gangsta rappers such as Dr. Dre, Snoop Dogg and Ice Cube, who attempts to have sex with them after they smoke crack. "The Bank" is a prank call to AIB Bank that comically exaggerates a typical customer service call. "I Wanna Fight Your Father" is a popular single that describes a girl named Róisín's boyfriend wishing to fight her disapproving father. This track is followed by the Irish language version "Ba Mhaith Liom Bruion le D'Athair."

== Track listing ==
All tracks are written by The Rubberbandits.

No.	Title	Length
1.	"Bag of Glue"	4:22
2.	"Pure Awkward"	3:49
3.	"The Bank"	4:23
4.	"I Wanna Fight Your Father"	3:29
5.	"Ba Mhaith Liom Bruion le D'Athair"	3:51
6.	"Tommy Bread"	2:11
7.	"Willie O'Dea"	4:45
8.	"Horse Outside"	4:24
9.	"The Psychotherapist"	3:42
10.	"Up Da Ra"	4:13
11.	"Greyhound Shuffle"	4:07
12.	"Antneys Eye"	4:46
13.	"26 x 28 cm. Oil on Mr. Consodine"	1:29
14.	"I Like to Shift Girls"	4:04
15.	"Black Man"	3:04
16.	"Fight Me At Mass"	2:45
17.	"Banknotes"	1:32
18.	"Spoiling Ivan"	3:48
19.	"Buddies in Boston"	2:21
20.	"Choppy Nagle"	1:36
21.	"Spastic Hawk"	4:20
22.	"The Drawing"	1:35
23.	"Danny Dyer"	4:05
24.	"Double Dropping Yokes with Eamon de Valera"	4:33
Total length:		83:14
