= Dublin Gospel Choir =

- Also known as: DGC
- Origin: Dublin, Ireland
- Genre: Gospel
- Years active: 1996–present
- Website: Official website

The Dublin Gospel Choir are an Irish gospel choir that have been performing in Ireland since 1996.

== History ==
The choir was founded as a school choir in Dublin's inner city in the mid-1990s. The choir have performed over several years at Ireland's annual boutique festival, the Electric Picnic, appearing on the event's main stage for the sixth consecutive year in 2010. They also performed to an 82,000 person crowd at Croke Park in 2008.

The choir also featured (along with Chris de Burgh) on a special New Year's Day BBC Songs of Praise programme which was reputedly broadcast to over 35 million viewers worldwide. The group has performed with Paddy Casey, Rod Stewart, OutKast, Kodaline, Damien Rice, The Chieftains and Stevie Wonder.
