= The Blindboy Podcast =

Irish podcast

- Genre: Arts, society and culture, music, social economics, mental health, abstract thinking, history, food
- Format: Monologue, Guest interview
- Country of origin: Limerick, Ireland.
- Language: English

Cast and voices
- Hosted by: Blindboy Boatclub

Production
- Length: 60–90 Minutes

Technical specifications
- Audio format: iTunes, Acast, Spotify

Publication
- No. of episodes: 433
- Original release: October 25, 2017

Reception
- Ratings: 4.846153846153846/5

Related
- Website: www.theblindboypodcast.ie

The Blindboy Podcast is a podcast hosted by the Irish musician, writer, and comedian Blindboy Boatclub of The Rubberbandits.

== Background ==
The series began with Blindboy reading a selection of short stories from his first book, The Gospel According to Blindboy. According to blindboy the first episode had 70,000 listens within a week. When the third episode was released, the podcast had been at the top of the Irish Apple podcasts charts for two weeks in a row. According to the Irish Independent, the podcast had 150,000 weekly listeners in March 2018. Phoebe Greenwood recommended the show in The Guardian saying that "there are heaps of episodes and not a dud among them."

The show is independently produced and is funded through Patreon. Blindboy Boatclub has indicated that he likes the format of a podcast because it provides space to produce exactly the content he wants to do, without being restricted by editors or funding. A fan of the show came out to Blindboy's studio and soundproofed it for him.

== Content ==
The episodes are created with different approaches. Most of them are pure monologues, while for some of them, he interviews a guest. These episodes are limited to his live-podcast shows, which are recorded, post-edited and occasionally get published as an episode. Some of his guests include Sinéad O'Connor, who he interviewed about her creative process and spirituality, and Sabina Brennan, with whom he talked about the brain and our need for patterns and routines. Manchán Magan was a recurring guest.

Another recurring episode concept is what he calls 'phone calls', in which he uses the "stream of consciousness" style to explore eclectic, often niche or personal topics.

Frequent topics in his monologues are Irish mythology, history and culture of oral storytelling, mental health and various socio-political issues. He also discusses his experiences managing his mental health using cognitive behavioural therapy. He frequently talks about his autism diagnosis on the show, which he received during the course of the podcast. In another episode, he discussed the 2018 referendum on the eighth Amendment of the Constitution of Ireland and encouraged his listeners to vote 'yes' to repeal the amendment and make abortion legal in Ireland.
