= The Almost Impossible Gameshow =

- Genre: Game show
- Written by: The Rubberbandits
- Directed by: Kevin Batchelor
- Narrated by: The Rubberbandits
- Country of origin: United Kingdom
- Original language: English
- No. of series: 2
- No. of episodes: 12

Production
- Executive producer: Catherine Lynch
- Producer: Richard Greenwood
- Editor: Connor Snedecor
- Running time: 60 minutes (inc. adverts)
- Production company: Initial

Original release
- Network: ITV2
- Release: 1 October 2015 – 11 May 2016

The Almost Impossible Gameshow is a British game show that aired on ITV2 from 1 October 2015 to 11 May 2016 and is hosted by The Rubberbandits.

== Gameplay ==
Each contestant starts the contest with 50 lives, and takes on a series of games. These games are designed to be extremely difficult, hence the show's name. For each attempt that ends in failure, the contestant loses one life and must reattempt the game. The contestant can only move on to another game after one successful attempt, or after failing the game outright by making 15 failed attempts. If the contestant can successfully complete five games before running out of lives, they win a trophy; any contestant who runs out of lives is out of the game.

=== Games ===
Games are sorted into seven zones: Tunnel, Paddock, Hill, Runway, Mud Pit, Hangar and Pool.

Zone	Name	Description
Tunnel	Groin Croissant	Contestants are given ten seconds to shake off several croissants that are stuck on various bits of their suit including on their crotch with Velcro.
Tunnel	Word Lick	Contestants are given ten seconds to lick their way around a glass sheet containing a six-letter word whilst blindfolded and then identify the word.
Tunnel	Bum Magnet	Contestants use a magnet in the bottom area of their suit to guide a metal disc around a vertical maze; a life is lost if the disc falls before the end.
Tunnel	Shock Roulette	Contestants must find the one handle out of ten that won't give them an electric shock.
Tunnel	Shin Smash	Contestants must time a jump sixteen seconds after a whistle to avoid their shins being hit by a thwacker.
Paddock	Dizzy Hurdle	In twenty seconds, jump over two hurdles while blindfolded and having been spun around for ten seconds.
Paddock	Blind Bender	Contestants have ten seconds to limbo under a pole whilst blindfolded.
Paddock	Eggy Hammer	Using a hammer attached to their helmet, contestants must smash five eggs, lined up at different heights, within five seconds. The egg only need be cracked.
Paddock	Musical Chair	Contestants have ten seconds to find a tiny chair and sit on it.
Paddock	Hop and Hide	Contestants have ten seconds to hop while tied while finding a place to hide.
Hill	Slippy Hill	Contestants must slide down a slippery hill barefoot without falling over.
Runway	Enter Trouser	Contestants have twenty seconds to reach and put on a pair of trousers that are hanging in the air while running on a treadmill, without falling over.
Runway	Bouncy Sprint	Contestants have ten seconds to bounce across a treadmill on a space hopper.
Runway	Yum Yum Run	Contestants have ten seconds to run along the treadmill and leap up to take a bite from a doughnut (or similar confection) hanging above the track.
Mud Pit	Tiny Bike	Contestants cycle across a narrow platform on a small bike without falling off, putting his/her feet down or unseating from the saddle.
Hangar	Punch Your Own Face	A cream cake is dropped from a height, contestants must punch their face and squash the cream cake at the same time.
Hangar	Hat Pop	Contestants, blindfolded and wearing a sombrero with a balloon on it, jumps around to bounce against the pin hanging from the ceiling and pop the balloon in ten seconds.
Hangar	Cream Fling	Contestants throw a cream cake into their mouth, with a ceramic bar across their wrists to limit the height of the throw.
Hangar	Teabag Thrust	Contestants hang a teabag between their legs and tries to catch it in a cup attached to their crotch within ten seconds.
Hangar	Crotch Catch	Contestants chuck an egg over a beam and has to catch it in a bowl attached to their crotch.
Hangar	Rump Pump	Contestants have to pump a balloon and sit/stand repeatedly until it is pumped.
Hangar	Candle Scream	With their head positioned through a hole in a table, contestants must pull a candle on a wheeled plate towards them using a piece of string in their mouth, and then scream the candle out.
Hangar	Sweetcorn Drop	Whilst wearing a pair of long arms, contestants have to pick up a kernel of sweetcorn and drop it into their mouth.
Pool	Belly Flop	Contestants have to belly flop on to a ball which is being spat out of a vent.
Pool	Tiny Boat	Contestants must travel from one end of the pool to the other in thirty seconds using a small boat and a stirring spoon as an oar without falling out of the boat.
Pool	Wet Slippy Discs	Contestants have to run across the length of the pool over a pathway of floating discs

=== Contestants and winners ===
Each episode has 10 contestants attempting to complete five challenges without losing all of their 50 starting lives. Across the two series broadcast on ITV2, five contestants successfully conquered the course to win the trophy. In Series 1, there were three winners: Saylan won Episode 1, completing "Tiny Bike" with 9 lives remaining; Chris won Episode 2, also ending on "Tiny Bike" with 5 lives remaining; and Stephen won Episode 4, completing "Cream Fling" with 12 lives left. In Series 2, there were two winners: Leo won Episode 3, finishing on "Musical Chair" with 16 lives left; and Kelly won Episode 5, completing "Tiny Boat" with 7 lives remaining.

Series & Episode	Winner	Final Challenge	Remaining Lives
Series 1, Episode 1	Saylan	Tiny Bike	9
Series 1, Episode 2	Chris	Tiny Bike	5
Series 1, Episode 4	Stephen	Cream Fling	12
Series 2, Episode 3	Leo	Musical Chair	16
Series 2, Episode 5	Kelly	Tiny Boat	7

== International versions ==
Country	Name	Host	Network	Date premiered
Portugal	Parece Impossível!	João Manzarra and Inês Aires Pereira	SIC	4 August – 5 October 2024
United States	The Almost Impossible Game Show	The Rubberbandits	MTV	2016

- An American version was produced in the United States under the same name, but only aired 2 episodes on MTV. The Rubberbandits also narrated this version. In this version, contestants were only given 40 lives, failed a challenge outright after 10 failed attempts, and only needed to complete four challenges to win. In addition to the trophy, winning contestants received a cash prize of $500.
