= I Wanna Fight Your Father =

Single by The Rubberbandits

from the album Serious About Men
- Released: February 25, 2011
- Genre: Pop
- Length: 3:29
- Label: Lovely men
- Songwriter(s): Dave Chambers * Bob McGlynn

The Rubberbandits singles chronology
"Horse Outside" (2010)	"I Wanna Fight Your Father" (2011)	"Spastic Hawk" (2011)

"I Wanna Fight Your Father" is a song by Irish comedy duo The Rubberbandits, taken as their second single. It was released on 25 February 2011.

== Video ==
A video for the song was released on 24 February 2011, which was later removed (It was re-uploaded on November 30, 2011, except the song had slightly altered, they call this the album version). The duo also released a video for the Irish language version of the song, "Ba Mhaith Liom Bruíon le d'Athair", which, as of November 2015, has over a million views. The Irish-language version samples the riff from the Minnie Riperton song "Inside My Love".

=== Chart positions ===
Chart (2011)	Peak position
Ireland (IRMA)	6
