= Madeline Mulqueen =

Irish model and occasional actress (born 1990)

- Born: 19 July 1990 (age 36); Limerick, Ireland
- Spouse: Jack Reynor (m. 2024)
- Modeling information
- Height: 5 ft 9 in (1.75 m)
- Hair color: Brown
- Eye color: Green
- Agency: Distinct Model Management

Madeline Mulqueen (born 19 July 1990) is an Irish model and occasional actress.

== Background ==
Mulqueen was born in Limerick in 1990, and raised in Kildimo, County Limerick. She went to Laurel Hill Coláiste FCJ, she studied at Mary Immaculate College in Limerick.

== Career ==
Mulqueen started out with the Fíona Doyle agency, before being signed by The Martina Costelloe Agency. Mulqueen entered several regional modelling contests, including the South West Model Search, which she won, and was runner-up in the Miss Limerick contest in 2009.

Mulqueen appeared in the music video to the song "Horse Outside" by the Limerick comedy hip-hop duo The Rubberbandits. The video shows a wedding scene, with Mulqueen playing the sought-after bridesmaid at the wedding. This role brought Mulqueen national attention as the video had received more than 11 million hits on YouTube as of August 2014, came second on the Irish Singles Chart in the hunt for the Christmas number one, and was called "the biggest song in Ireland in a generation". As a result of the video, Mulqueen became the most googled woman in Ireland. Following the success of "Horse Outside", Mulqueen appeared on comedy programme Republic of Telly on RTÉ Two, and then appeared in the second celebrity special of TV3's Come Dine with Me, which aired in December 2012.

Mulqueen has been critical of the Irish modelling industry, saying she finds it "disheartening to see a lot of the focus on over-sexualising models".

== Personal life ==
Mulqueen lives in Wicklow. She is married to Irish actor Jack Reynor. They became engaged in Hong Kong in March 2014, a year after meeting.

In October 2012, Mulqueen was assaulted in the Grafton Street branch of McDonald's. She had come to the defence of a member of staff during a dispute with a customer about payment. The customer punched Mulqueen on the jaw.
