= Jack Reynor =

Irish actor (born 1992)

- Reynor at the New York Comic Con in 2022
- Born: 23 January 1992 (age 34); Longmont, Colorado, U.S.
- Citizenship: Ireland; United States (Note: Irish citizen via jus sanguinis, US citizen via jus soli.)
- Occupation: Actor
- Years active: 2000–present
- Spouse: Madeline Mulqueen (m. 2024)

Jack Reynor (born 23 January 1992) is an American-born Irish actor. He won the IFTA Award for Best Lead Actor – Film for his performance in What Richard Did (2012), and Best Supporting Actor for Sing Street (2016). His other notable films include Transformers: Age of Extinction (2014), Glassland (2014), Macbeth (2015), Midsommar (2019) and Lee Cronin's The Mummy (2026), as well as the television series Strange Angel (2018–19) and The Peripheral (2022).

== Early life ==
Reynor was born on 23 January 1992 in Longmont, Colorado, the son of an Irish mother and an American father. He has a younger brother and sister. He initially lived in Boulder, Colorado, with his mother, human rights activist Tara Reynor O'Grady, but she moved and brought him to Valleymount, County Wicklow, at the age of two. He attended primary school in Valleymount and spent his formative years there with his mother and maternal grandparents, Damien and Pat Reynor. His interest in acting began when he played an altar boy on the set of Country in 1999. He moved to Dublin in 2004 to attend Belvedere College, a private Jesuit secondary school, where he performed onstage in numerous theatrical productions.

== Career ==
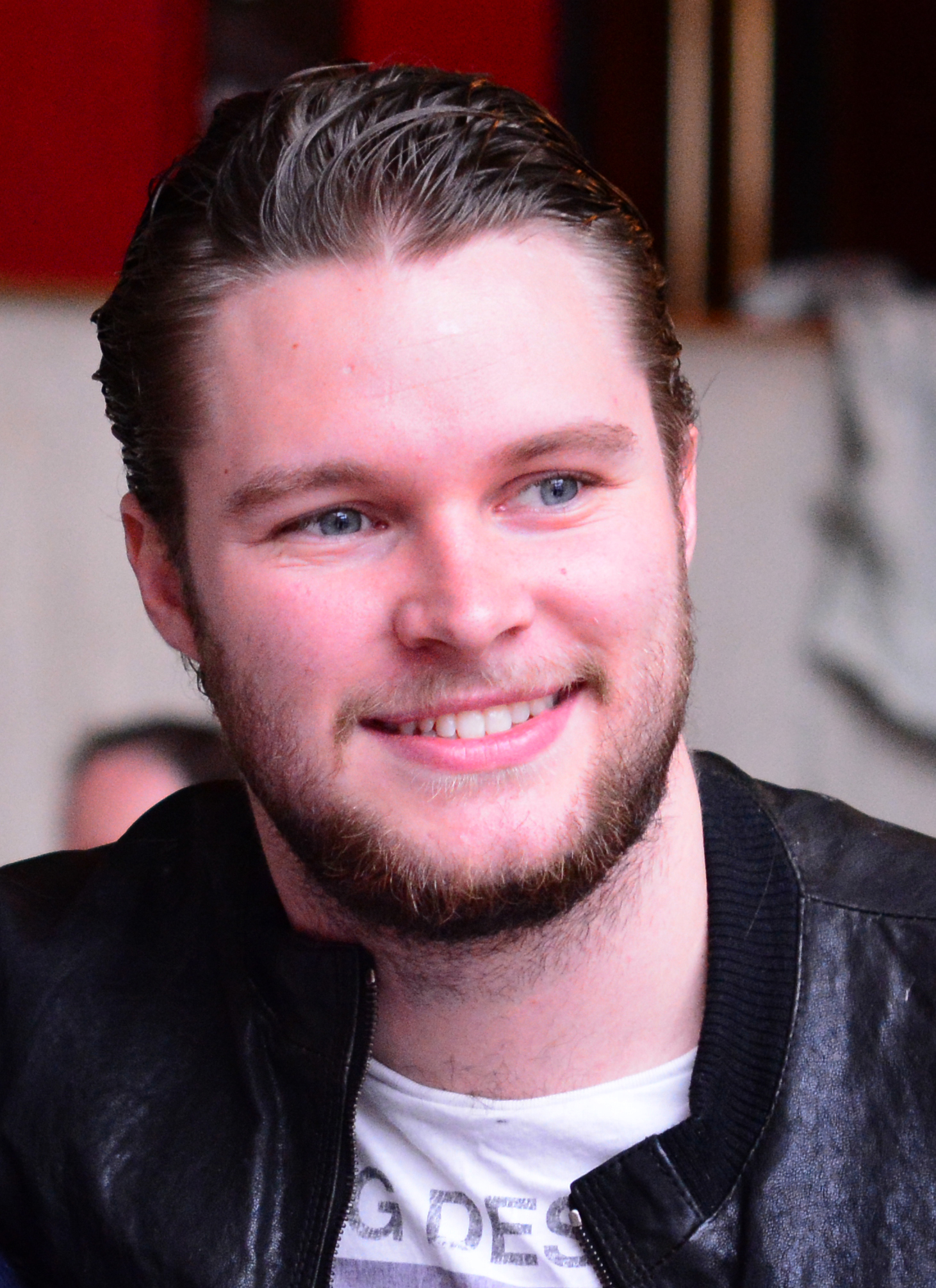
Reynor in 2014

In early 2010, Reynor was cast as Robbie, "the boy next door", in the live-format, unscripted Dollhouse, directed by Kirsten Sheridan, which premiered at Berlinale 2012. He depicted Richard Karlsen in Lenny Abrahamson's feature What Richard Did, which screened at the 2013 Tribeca Film Festival. The film portrays the fall of a high school rugby star and golden boy whose world unravels after his involvement in an act of careless violence. Reynor earned the Irish Film and Television Academy (IFTA) award for best actor in 2013 for his performance.

In January 2013, Reynor was cast as Shane, an Irish race car driver, in Transformers: Age of Extinction. The film was released in June 2014 and co-starred Mark Wahlberg and Nicola Peltz. It broke worldwide box office records, making just over $1.1 billion and becoming the highest-grossing film in Chinese history.

Days after wrapping the T4 global press tour, Reynor travelled to London to shoot Andy Serkis' Netflix film Mowgli (filmed in 2015 but not released until 2018), alongside Christian Bale, Cate Blanchett and Benedict Cumberbatch. The film used facial recognition technology that was invented for the project. Also that year, Reynor starred in writer-director Gerard Barrett's film Glassland with Toni Collette and Will Poulter, in which he plays a young taxi driver who struggles to instil a sense of structure in his life while his mother suffers from severe alcoholism. The film was released in early 2015 and earned Reynor the World Cinema Dramatic Special Jury Award for Acting at the Sundance Film Festival. After Glassland, Reynor shot Julian Jarrold's romantic comedy, A Royal Night Out. His role opposite Sarah Gadon was the character RAF airman Jack, the young Princess Elizabeth's fictional romantic interest during the VE Day celebrations in 1945.

Reynor starred as Malcolm Canmore, the rightful heir to the throne of Scotland, in a film adaptation of Macbeth; it premiered in Edinburgh in September 2015. Following that, he next completed shooting John Carney's project, playing Brendan in Sing Street, set in 1980s Dublin. It premiered at the 2016 Sundance Film Festival.

He appeared in the 2017 miniseries Philip K. Dick's Electric Dreams and the 2018 drama film On the Basis of Sex, and then starred in the 2019 horror film Midsommar. He appeared in the Amazon Prime Video series The Peripheral, and as a cast member of the Netflix series The Perfect Couple.

== Personal life ==
Reynor met Irish model and actress Madeline Mulqueen in 2013, and they became engaged in March 2014. They married in 2024. They live in County Wicklow.

In May 2025, Reynor signed an open letter urging London's Almeida Theatre to cut ties with Bloomberg Philanthropies due its financial support of Israeli settlements during the ongoing Gaza war.

== Filmography ==
=== Film ===
| Year | Title | Role | Notes |
|---|---|---|---|
| 2000 | Country | Altar Boy | |
| 2012 | Dollhouse | Robbie | |
| 2012 | What Richard Did | Richard Karlsen | |
| 2013 | Cold | Rory | Also known as Leopard |
| 2013 | Delivery Man | Josh | |
| 2014 | Transformers: Age of Extinction | Shane Dyson | |
| 2014 | Glassland | John | |
| 2015 | A Royal Night Out | Jack Hodges | |
| 2015 | Macbeth | Malcolm | |
| 2016 | Sing Street | Brendan Lawlor | |
| 2016 | Free Fire | Harry | |
| 2016 | The Secret Scripture | Michael McNulty | |
| 2017 | The Man with the Iron Heart | Jozef Gabčík | |
| 2017 | Detroit | Ronald August | |
| 2018 | Kin | James "Jimmy" Solinski | |
| 2018 | On the Basis of Sex | James "Jim" Bozarth | |
| 2018 | Mowgli: Legend of the Jungle | Brother Wolf | Voice and motion capture |
| 2019 | Midsommar | Christian Hughes | |
| 2019 | Bainne | —N/a | Short film Director and writer |
| 2021 | Cherry | Pills & Coke | |
| 2023 | Flora and Son | Ian | |
| 2023 | The Good Mother | Toby Bennings | |
| 2026 | Lee Cronin's The Mummy | Charlie Cannon | |
| 2026 | Power Ballad | Mac | |
| TBA | A Colt Is My Passport | TBA | Post-production |
| TBA | Seasons | TBA | Filming |

=== Television ===
| Year | Title | Role | Notes |
|---|---|---|---|
| 2010 | Three Wise Women | Colin | Television film |
| 2012 | Chasing Leprechauns | Thomas "Tommy" Riley | Television film |
| 2017 | Philip K. Dick's Electric Dreams | Brian Norton | Episode: "Impossible Planet" |
| 2018–19 | Strange Angel | Jack Parsons | Main role |
| 2021 | Modern Love | Declan | Episode: "Strangers on a (Dublin) Train" |
| 2022 | The Peripheral | Burton Fisher | 8 episodes |
| 2024 | The Perfect Couple | Thomas Winbury | Miniseries |
| 2026 | Citadel | Hutch | Main role |
