= Gerry Mallon =

Irish comedian

- Born: between 1959 and 1976; County Mayo, Ireland

Comedy career
- Years active: 1991–present
- Medium: Stand-up, comedy MC, comedy promoter
- Genre: Observational comedy
- Subjects: Relationships, Everyday Life, Ireland, Parenthood, Recreational drug use, Human sexuality, Pessimism, Buckfast

Gerry Mallon (born between 1959 and 1976) is a Galway-based Irish comedian and MC who has performed stand-up in Ireland and the United Kingdom since at least 1998. Mallon was the main organiser of the Galway Comedy Festival as of 2007, and has also been involved in the running of comedy tents at various Irish music festivals, including Electric Picnic.

Mallon acts as the MC for the Laughter Loft lunchtime comedy gigs which have been held since 2004 at The King's Head pub in Galway during the run of the city's International Arts Festival each summer. The Galway Advertiser described Mallon's Laughter Loft as an "Arts Festival institution".

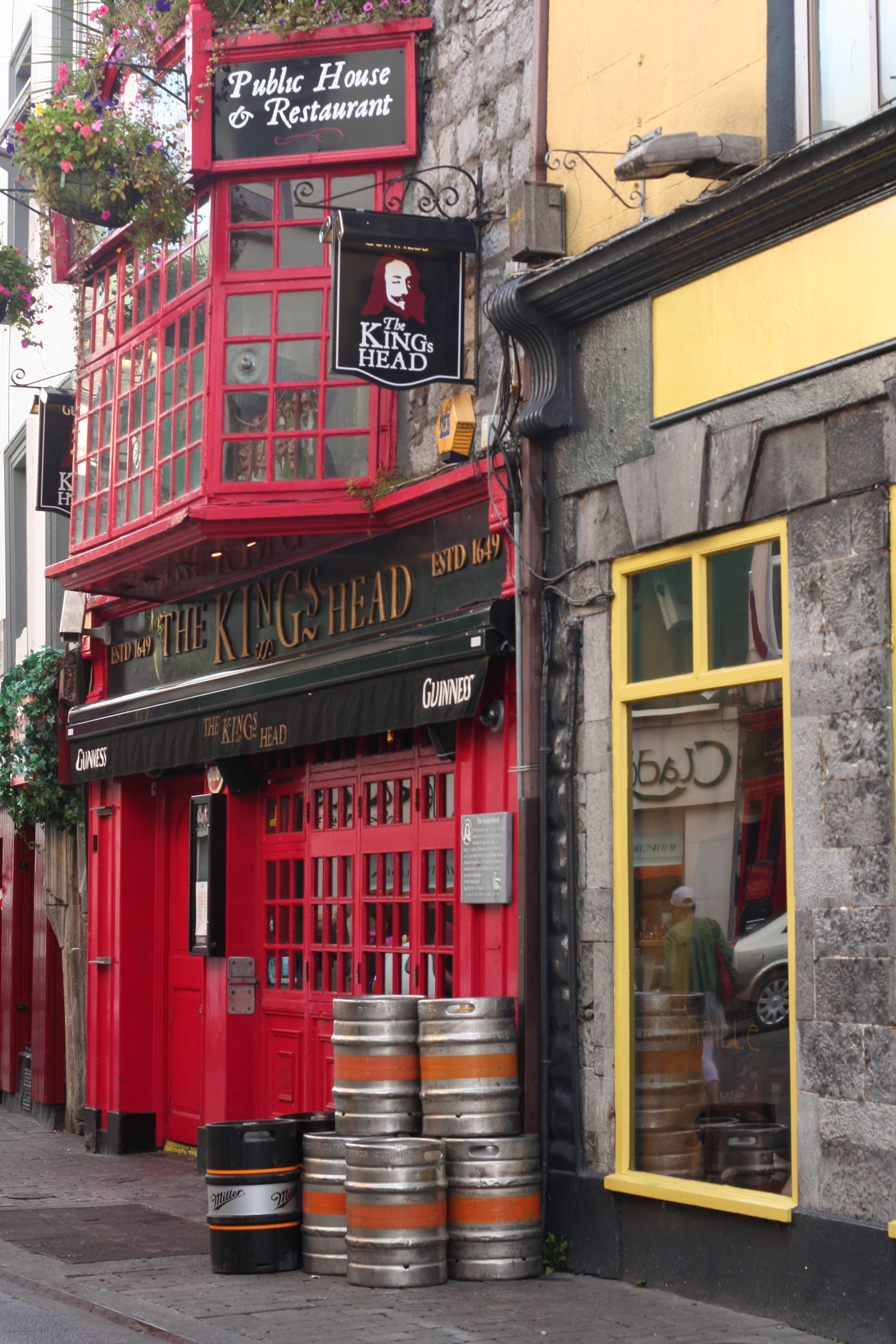
The King's Head pub in Galway city, the venue for Mallon's Laughter Loft

Mallon is "reluctant to divulge his age" but has admitted he is "younger than Paul McGrath but a bit older than Ronaldo", putting his birth year somewhere between 1959 and 1976. As of 2001, he lived in Connemara.

== Early life ==
Mallon was born in County Mayo, but moved to County Galway c.1982 to work as an oyster farmer in the coastal town of Oranmore.

Speaking to Olaf Tyaransen of Hot Press magazine in 2007, he admitted he "never harboured any youthful ambitions to become a professional stand-up", adding "I suppose I was always the class maggot when I was a teenager [..] but I never really thought of making a career out of it. I always enjoyed comedy, but I wasn't one of those people building up big video or audio collections of comedians when I was growing up or anything."

== Career ==
Mallon first became involved in comedy in 1991 while handing out flyers for a venue called The Junction, Galway's first comedy club, which had been set up by his friends Cillian Fennell and Pearse Boyce. Irish comedian Dermot Morgan (1952–1998) was booked as the first act to perform at the club, as the organisers wanted a "big name to open the place". Mallon and associates had to use their rent money as well as the winnings from a poker machine to pay Morgan's fee, as the takings on the door had not been sufficient.

Fennell eventually moved to Dublin to produce The Late Late Show, and Boyce started a production company, leaving Mallon to operate the comedy club alone.

Mallon noted that "There wasn't really a (comedy) scene at all (in Galway) back then", and the comedy club relied on the Dublin-based comedy act Mr Trellis performing alternating weeks at the venue: "It'd be Ardal (O'Hanlon), Barry (Murphy), Kevin (Gildea), Ardal, Barry, Kevin, The Quack Squad (Joe Rooney and Paul Tylak), Ardal, Barry, Kevin . . . (laughs)." One evening, the regular compere of the club couldn't make it, and Mallon had to stand in for him, having "always harboured notions of being a comedian" himself:

"It was fucking terrible," he groans. "When I stood up there for the very first show I was like a rabbit in front of the headlights of a car. I looked like a complete eejit..."

In the programme for the 1996 Galway Arts Festival, Mallon was given the following intro (as part of his inclusion in the comedy trio Gael Force 3): "No stranger to Galway audiences, Big Gerry Mallon has been resident MC at the city's comedy club since 1994. He's brought his deranged worldview to every comedy club in the country and has been described as a big, soft, cuddly hoodlum".

Mallon was noted as "regularly tour(ing)" both Britain and Ireland as of 1998, having developed a "full routine of his own", and as of 2001, explained his touring habits to Hot Press magazine:

"I do the Carrolls tours, I've done all the clubs in Ireland, the Gael Force III thing in Edinburgh with Tommy Tiernan and Patrick McDonnell and I've done various Arts Festivals and stuff as well," he explains. "I don't travel up east much, as you know. I don't need to actually, because every two bit town in the west has a festival of some sort during the summer and I make good bucks working those. I mean, I might be standing on the back of a truck doing my thing between the Guess How Many Maggots Are Eating The Sheep's Arse competition and the Dwarf Kicking competition, but at least it's a gig, y'know. I could go up and do the Cellar and other clubs in Dublin during the week but, with the exception of the Laughter Lounge which I've played a few times, most of the gigs in Dublin are relatively small so the fee would barely cover the train fare and a couple of beers."

In March 2001, Mallon explained how he had been running The Murphy's Comedy Club every Sunday night for "about three years" at the GPO nightclub on Galway's Eglinton Street. Tommy Tiernan began his comedy career in the club doing "open spots" and Mallon was credited with giving him his first break in a 1998 Irish Times article.

As of 2001, Mallon mused "I don't think I'm ever going to get anywhere huge with this because I'm not hungry enough to make the move across the water (to the UK) and most journalists can't be bothered to travel beyond Lucan. They never come over to see gigs in the west. I've actually got a big problem with this East versus West thing." Mallon bemoaned the fact that the English and Irish media "wouldn't ever venture beyond The Comedy Cellar" in Dublin at a time when the "two most successful clubs in the country which were trying something different" both happened to be outside of the capital city and consequently "never (got) a look in".

In 2003/04, Mallon gave Irish comedian David O'Doherty his first headline spot at the Comedy Club in Galway.

As of 2007, Mallon was still running his comedy club in Galway city, operating out of the Cuba nightclub every Sunday night. Mallon noted the presence of three weekly comedy clubs in Galway at the time, which he considered "a bit weird" considering the size of the city, adding "I think per head of capita, if you transfer(ed) that into Dublin terms, there'd be something like 58 comedy clubs." Mallon noted that while he was still MCing the comedy club and "occasionally doing bigger gigs", he was "not as interested in standing on the stage as he used to be".

In May 2010, he started The First Friday Comedy Club at The Co-Op in Moycullen, with David McSavage as inaugural headliner.

== Complaints ==
In February 2017, a number of complaints were made about Mallon's use of language while hosting a Show Me The Funny comedy event in Galway. Mallon defended the language he used and apologised if he had "inadvertently offended anyone", adding "Everyone has an opinion on what can or cannot be said in a live comedy situation."
