= The Trews (web series) =

YouTube web series

- Logo featuring Brian the dog
- Genre: News, politics, comedy
- Created by: Russell Brand; Gareth Roy
- Presented by: Russell Brand
- Opening theme: The Rubberbandits
- Country of origin: the United Kingdom
- Original language: English
- No. of episodes: 367

Production
- Producers: Gareth Roy; Marika Connoly; Charly Cox
- Running time: Varies (6–20 minutes)

Original release
- Network: YouTube
- Release: 27 February 2014 – 20 August 2015

The Trews was a YouTube web series by English comedian, actor and activist Russell Brand. The Trews features Brand and his take on media as it appears in newspapers or on television as well as special episodes in which Brand responds to comments left by viewers. The show's name is a portmanteau of "true" and "news".

The show is generally a solo piece to camera supplemented with clips and screenshots from the media but at times also features interviews with celebrities, activists and other guests. Notable guests have included Alain de Botton, Alastair Campbell and George Monbiot.

Brand's status as a comedian delivering political commentary has led to comparisons to Jon Stewart and Stephen Colbert, though Brand's approach is more "low-key". The series is typically filmed in a casual style at Brand's house in the Shoreditch district in the East End of London or in the car with Brand. According to journalist Kristian Markus, the format establishes "an intimate connection with his viewers, portraying himself not as some impenetrably pristine star fans are only to admire from a distance, but as a fellow citizen of the world who seeks connection with the people and world outside." A few episodes have been filmed at rallies, where Brand interviews activists about their causes.

The series is produced, directed and edited by Gareth Roy, a producer who has worked on other projects with Brand.

== History ==
The show debuted on 27 February 2014. With few exceptions and the 2015–16 hiatus period, a new episode is uploaded each weekday. The show's premise, according to Brand, is to provide "the true news so you don't have to invest any money in buying newspapers that charge you for the privilege of keeping your consciousness imprisoned in a tiny box of ignorance and lies."

A theme song for the show, performed by The Rubberbandits, debuted in April 2014. The show's logo features Brian, a white Alsatian dog, that belongs to Brand's ex-girlfriend, journalist and activist Jemima Khan.

In March 2015, the channel surpassed 1 million subscribers. The 300th Trews episode was posted on 16 April 2015. At the end of April 2015, the week before the general election, The Trews received significant international coverage after Labour leader Ed Miliband appeared on the show for an interview.

=== Hiatus and return ===
On 20 August 2015, Brand uploaded the 366th Trews video, announcing that it would be the final episode. He said "I think we've come as far as we can with The Trews... for now."

On 12 October 2016, Brand uploaded the 367th Trews video announcing his return, though no further episodes have been released since.

== Prevailing themes and messages ==
- News media, owned or funded by private concerns, work to support the status quo and as such should be approached with scepticism;
- There is a widening equity gap between rich and poor, significant wealth being held by a minority while the majority live with poverty or consumer debt;
- Insignificant distinction between major political parties has led to the establishment of two-party systems in British and US politics;
- Democracy and a consumer economy support each other and are as such corrupt;
- Global prioritisation of economic growth has led to a political neglect of environmental, social, and spiritual concerns;
- If existing social systems are corrupt or do not represent common interests, revolution may be required.

== Media coverage of The Trews ==
=== Fox News feud ===
Brand frequently analysed the commentary of the Fox News Channel and criticised its owner Rupert Murdoch, eventually sparking a feud with the network's conservative pundits.

In June 2014, Brand lampooned Jeanine Pirro in response to her appearance on Justice with Judge Jeanine, in which she suggested that ISIS "was trained by U.S. instructors at a secret base in Jordan" and that her solution to defeat ISIS is to "bomb them, bomb them, keep bombing them, bomb them again."

During Brand's analysis of Pirro's rant on 24 June 2014, he "picked apart" her argument:

Pirro: What should we do? Send in more troops to protect sacrifices already made? Cut a deal with the devil, Iran?
Brand: Iran is not the devil, and referring to them as such is incendiary and provocative. She's talking about the situation in Iraq, she's judged Iran to be in league with Satan or even the embodiment of Satan…
Pirro: The ISIS assault, the Islamic State of Iraq and Syria, signals the beginning of the reverse crusade. They are coming for us. To THEM, WE are the infidels.
Brand: Hold on. They're not (laughs). They're not coming. Also it's interesting the way she said "to THEM, WE are the infidels" meaning that she regards them as infidels! Which means unclean, disconnected from God. Don't try to counter religious extremism with religious extremism.
Pirro: Americans have shed enough blood there. My resolution? Airstrikes. Bomb them, bomb them, keep bombing them, bomb them again and again!
Brand: Fucking hell, Justice Judge Jeanine! Bomb them? She's pointing and everything, "Bomb them!" When they do these bombings, it creates more insurgents. That's what creates them. Don’t think of them as going down there and destroying stuff. Think of it as like a seed that goes into the ground and grows insurgents out of it.
Pirro: ISIS is a radical religious terrorist organisation.
Brand: So is Fox News. It's a fanatical terrorist propagandist organisation. This isn't reasonable, is it? The way she's talking: "Bomb them! Bomb them!" She's worse. You know when you see those videos of someone with like a (face mask) on and a rifle, going, "(imitates Arabic) Bomb them! Bomb them!" you go "fuckin’ hell, they're a bit heavy" – she's doing it, she's just doing it with a city backdrop! She's the savage. She's totally espousing savage values.

The Washington Post media critic Erik Wemple wrote of the episode, "The Brand video is indeed fun stuff. It's 100 percent derivative fare ... His riff gained a lot of recirculation on the Internet, via Raw Story, the Wrap, The Times of India and several others."

In a July 2014 episode ("Israel-Palestine: Is This A Debate?"), Brand ridiculed Sean Hannity's interview with Palestinian-American Yousef Munayyer, labelled the Fox host "a bully" for his treatment of Munayyer and said Hannity resembled "the Ken doll from Toy Story 3." The episode went viral, and Munayyer quipped that Brand's video received more viewers than Hannity's original interview. Hannity responded on air, showing clips from The Trews and calling Brand a "D-list actor better known for his failed marriage to Katy Perry."

The Trews and Brand's commentary on Fox were discussed on the network multiple times, and there was wide media coverage of the ongoing feud. In late August, panellists on Fox roundtable "The Five" derided Brand's comments on the network's coverage of the ongoing unrest in Ferguson, Missouri. Greg Gutfeld referred to Brand as a "scruff bucket" and a racist, while Brand laughed off the insults and referred to the Fox News presenters as "aliens." Gutfeld also called him a "left-wing commie scum" and said "radical Islam is spewing from his homeland, but he's too much of a coward to actually focus on that."

In October 2014, Brand said he had been scheduled to appear as a guest on Hannity's show, but producers canceled his appearance. He attempted to film an episode of The Trews outside of Fox News headquarters in New York City, but a security guard threatened to arrest him for trespassing.

=== 2014 Sydney hostage crisis ===
Australian news media discussed Brand after the 2014 Sydney hostage crisis, which began on 15 December, due to an episode of The Trews titled, "Don't Let Sydney Siege Claim Your Freedom". Using footage of Australian prime minister Tony Abbott, Brand explained in the 16 December episode:

That is the important thing here. Now, at this time, when we're finding out that the CIA used unconscionable torture methods to get information to go into a war that subsequently proved to be illegal and unfounded, gave the state more power as the result of events that may or may not be intrinsically linked to political objectives seems like a dangerous thing to do ... Terrorism is continually used as a tool to control the domestic population.

Yahoo! News website described the 212th episode of The Trews as a "crazed siege rant", the online Brisbane Times newspaper published just over two minutes of the episode, and the Nine News website wrote that Brand has "taken aim" at Abbott and targeted Rupert Murdoch. The video was viewed more than 235,000 times in a two-day period.

=== 2015 Miliband interview ===
In the week before the 2015 UK general election, The Trews received extensive media coverage after Brand interviewed Labour leader Ed Miliband for a two-part "Milibrand" episode that aired 30 April and 4 May. Prior to the interview being released, a photo of Miliband outside Brand's residence attracted significant media attention, and British Prime Minister David Cameron derided Miliband for doing the interview, saying "Brand is a joke and Miliband is a joke for seeing him." Britain's conservative papers and tabloids criticised Miliband harshly for the interview.

Writing for The Independent, Simon Usborne noted the popularity of The Trews and wrote, "By aligning himself with The Trews, Miliband may yet have the last laugh by reaching an audience for whom Newsnight is anathema." Another columnist for The Independent wrote, "my overwhelming feeling after having watched the interview was that it was authentic, and that in being so it had unwittingly revealed so much of the pre-election build-up to be the opposite. By comparison, the televised debates and interviews were both staid and staged." Journalist Alastair Campbell, who appeared on The Trews in May 2014, praised Miliband's decision in his Huffington Post blog.

International media also covered the story; The Washington Post asked in a headline, "Will Russell Brand decide the British election?" Steven Erlanger wrote in The New York Times that the interview "drowned out" Cameron's campaign promises on 30 April.

Ed Miliband's Labour Party lost the 2015 General Election while David Cameron's Conservative Party secured sole control, following their previous coalition government with the Liberal Democrats, increasing both their share of the national vote and number of votes, and increasing their number of Parliamentary seats.
