= Blindboy Boatclub =

Irish satirist, author, podcaster and documentary maker

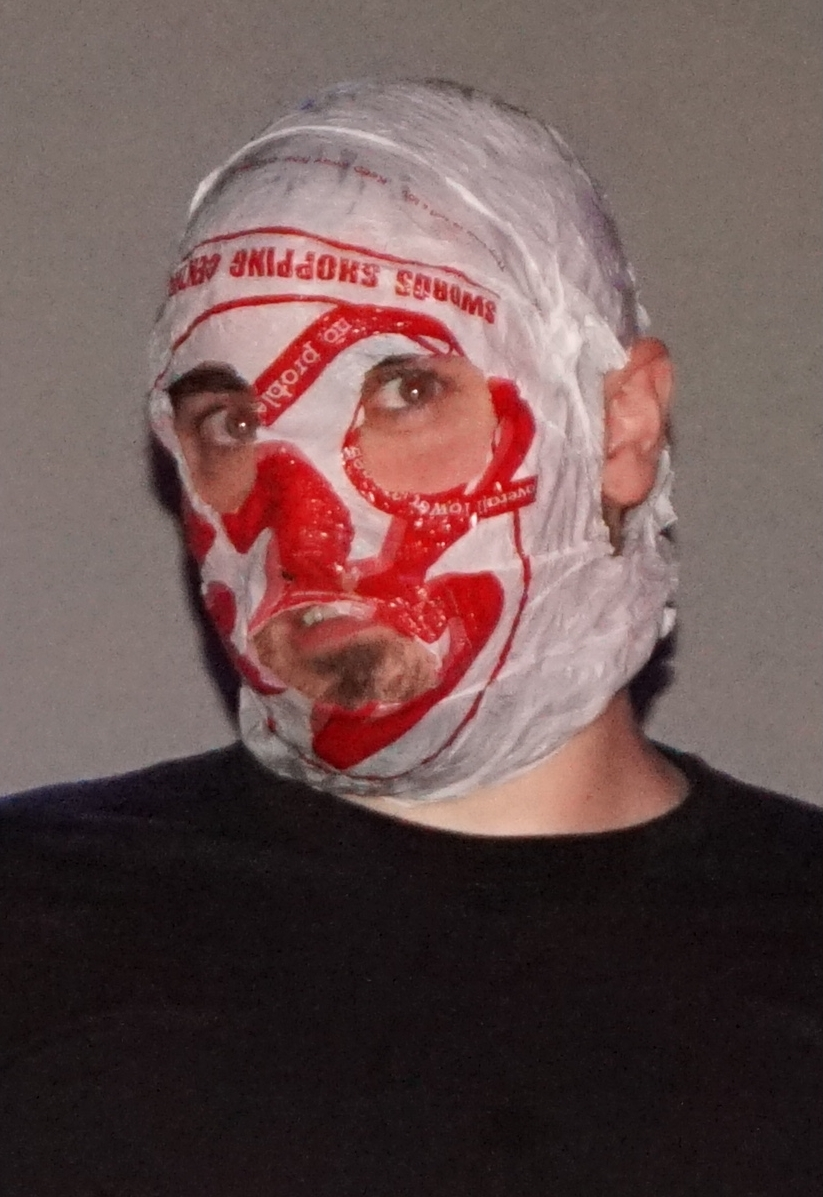
- Blindboy Boatclub
- Born: David Chambers; 1985 or 1986; Limerick, Ireland
- Education: Ardscoil Rís, Limerick, Limerick School of Art and Design

Comedy career
- Medium: Podcast; Television
- Genre: Satire
- Website: https://www.theblindboypodcast.ie/

David Chambers, known by his professional pseudonym Blindboy Boatclub, is an Irish satirist, musician, podcaster, author, and TV presenter.

From Limerick, Blindboy began his artistic career as one half of the Irish comedy hip-hop group The Rubberbandits, who wear plastic shopping bags as masks to conceal their identities.

Since 2017, he has been making The Blindboy Podcast, a podcast featuring interviews and coverage of social issues. He has also published a number of collections of short stories, and appeared on several television and podcast programmes. He regularly discusses mental health, masculinity, and other socio-political issues. Between 2018 and 2019, he produced a BBC Three documentary series, Blindboy Undestroys the World.

== Personal life ==
David Chambers was born on 1 May in Limerick in the mid-1980s, where he attended secondary school in Ardscoil Rís. While at school, he met Bob McGlynn and formed the satirical comedy pairing The Rubberbandits (performing under the pseudonyms "Blindboy Boatclub" and "Mr Chrome" respectively). Chambers later attended the Limerick School of Art and Design and in 2015 he earned his MA in Social Practice and the Creative Environment. He later commented on the degree, stating "It's an MA inside in the art college, which is perfectly suited for artists who work away from galleries, and tend to focus on society".

Chambers was diagnosed with autism in his 30s following comments from The Blindboy Podcast listeners.

== Podcast ==
Originally touring and performing as part of a duo, Chambers (under the name Blindboy Boatclub) has produced a number of "solo" works, including a podcast which covers topics such as mental health, politics, culture, music, and history. In the Blindboy Podcast, Blindboy sometimes provides "hot takes" and social commentary alongside personal stories and "absurdist riffs". The podcast has also included interviews with people such as Bernadette Devlin McAliskey, Spike Lee, Sinéad O'Connor, Emma Dabiri, Colm O'Gorman, Cillian Murphy and other comedians, activists and academics.

The podcast reportedly has 250,000 weekly listeners in Ireland and over a million worldwide listeners monthly. Blindboy has also played live tours of the podcast around Ireland and the UK, also touring in Australia, New Zealand, and Canada.

== Twitch stream ==
Beginning in 2020, Blindboy began a regular Twitch stream, which to date has featured him playing Red Dead Redemption II, while also creating live music using a combination of guitars, keyboard, drums, cowbell and his own ad-libbed vocals, and interacting with fans. From January 2021, he reduced the stream to just Thursday evenings, in order to concentrate on other work.

== Television ==
Blindboy made a five-part documentary series called Blindboy Undestroys the World for BBC Three which explored contemporary issues in the UK. The 2018 pilot episode, which covered the housing system in the UK, was long-listed for a BAFTA award. This was followed by a four-part series in 2019 which looked at precarious employment, anxiety, the internet, and modern slavery.

Blindboy has also appeared on several Irish programmes, including The Late Late Show and The Tommy Tiernan Show. He has also appeared on Russell Brand's Under the Skin with Russell Brand, The Trews web series, and Andrew Callaghan's Channel 5 with Andrew Callaghan web series.

In 2024, Blindboy wrote an episode of RTE Storyland titled "Did You Read About Erskine Fogarty?", starring Robert Sheehan, Peter Coonan and Lalor Roddy.

== Books ==
He has published three collections of satirical short stories:

- The Gospel According to Blindboy. Gill Books. 2017. p. 304. ISBN 978-0-7171-7887-2.
- Boulevard Wren and other Stories. Gill Books. 2019. p. 304. ISBN 978-0-7171-8950-2.
- Topographia Hibernica. Coronet. 16 November 2023. p. 288. ISBN 978-1-5293-7162-8.
