= Matt McGinn (Irish songwriter) =

- Born: 26 December 1978 (age 47)
- Origin: County Down, Northern Ireland
- Genres: Folk music, indie, folk rock, Americana
- Occupations: Singer-songwriter, record producer
- Instruments: Vocals, guitar, piano, bass, percussion
- Years active: 2001–present
- Labels: Self, Bin-Lid Records
- Website: www.mattmcginnmusic.com

Matt McGinn (born 26 December 1978) is a Northern Irish singer/songwriter, producer, multi-instrumentalist, and arranger. He has released several albums, as well as a number of E.P.s and collaborations with other artists.

== Career ==
Matt McGinn became a professional musician in 2004 after leaving Queen's University in Belfast where he was reading music. Performing as a multi-instrumentalist and session musician guitarist with Juliet Turner and Gareth Dunlop, McGinn also found work as an engineer.

A songwriter and performer in his own right, as of 2018 McGinn had written and produced three albums.

In February 2012, McGinn played at the Belfast Nashville Festival, performing 'in the round' with Nanci Griffith. Later in 2012, and together with other contributors to the Northern Ireland Music Therapy Trust, McGinn recorded a CD of songs intended to support those with learning difficulties.

In 2014, he won RTÉ 2FM's competition 'Play the Picnic', giving unsigned artists the opportunity to play Ireland's largest festival, Electric Picnic. In a review of his 2015 album, Latter Day Sinner, Folk Radio UK described some of his recordings as "drawn[ing] comparisons to Glen Hansard but, there's definite hints of Paul Simon in there too".

In 2016, McGinn teamed up with fellow Northern Irish songwriters, Ben Glover & Malojian and toured Ireland and Europe under the moniker 'Northern Lights'.

His music production credits include Jack O'Neill, an award-winning album with Guys & Dolls, and the debut album of Na Leanai.

== Personal ==
Matt McGinn was born in Newry, County Down on 26 December 1978. He now lives in Hilltown, County Down with his wife and family.

== Selected discography ==
=== Albums ===
- 2022 – Time Well Spent
- 2020 – Lessons of War
- 2018 – The End of the Common Man
- 2015 – Latter Day Sinner
- 2012 – Livin'

=== Collaborations and EPs ===
- 2015 – Alasdair Roberts – Missed Flights & Fist Fights
- 2014 – Ben Glover – Atlantic
- 2012 – Ben Glover – The Crossroads Sessions
