= David Kushner =

David Kushner or Dave Kushner may be:

- David Kushner (writer)
- David Kushner (singer-songwriter)
- Dave Kushner, (born 1966), rock guitarist
