= Horse Outside =

2010 single by The Rubberbandits

Single by The Rubberbandits

from the album Serious About Men
- Released: December 8, 2010
- Recorded: 2010
- Genre: Hip hop, comedy
- Length: 3:36 (single version)
- Label: Lovely Men
- Songwriter: The Rubberbandits

The Rubberbandits singles chronology
"Horse Outside" (2010)	"I Wanna Fight Your Father" (2011)

Official video
- "Horse Outside" on YouTube

"Horse Outside" is a song by Irish comedy group The Rubberbandits. It was released on 8 December 2010, after its accompanying music video was aired on RTÉ Television programme Republic of Telly. The video gained almost 2.5 million views in ten days on YouTube and by November 2023 over 22 million views. It was targeted to become the Irish Christmas number one single of 2010, ultimately finishing second.

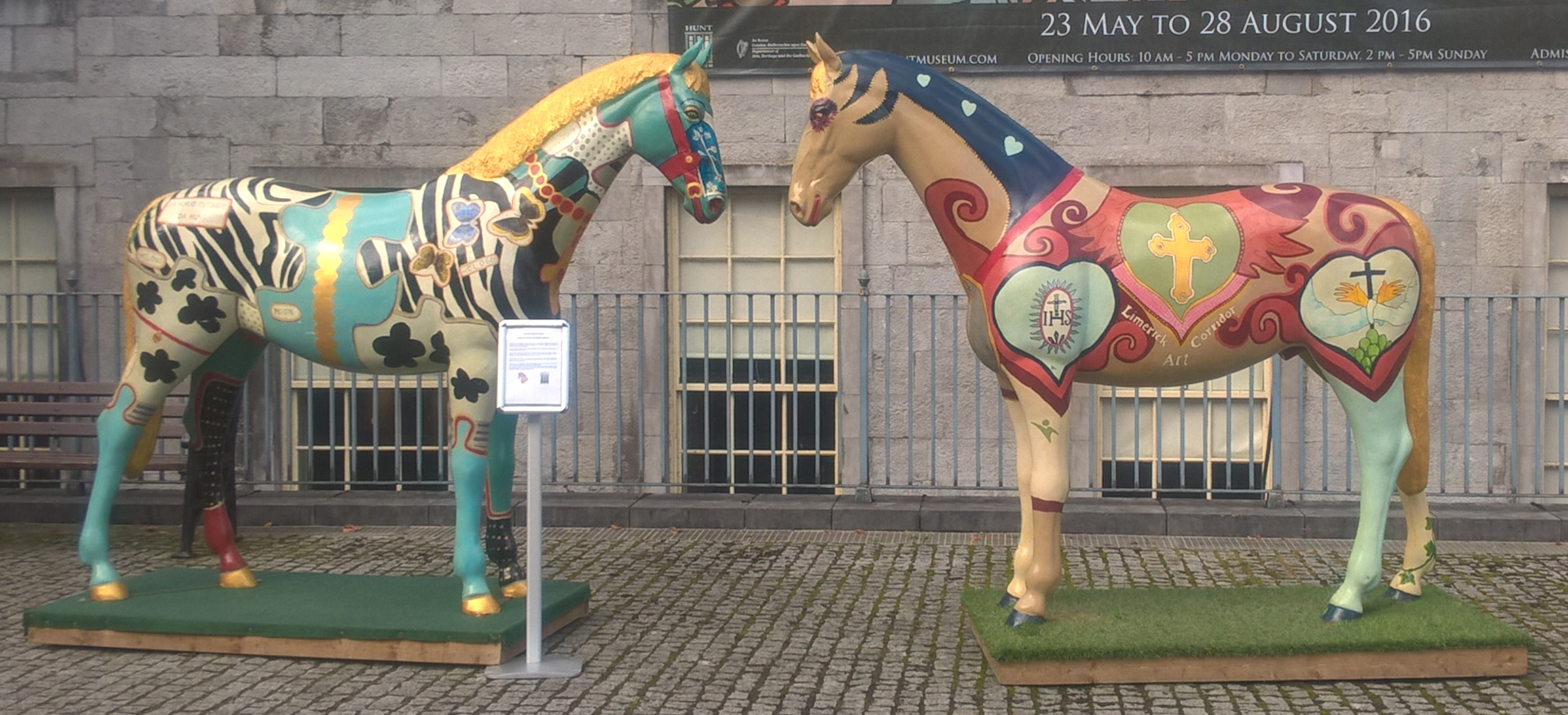
"Horse Outside" art installation, Hunt Museum, Limerick Ireland, 2016

It has also resulted in first one then two lifesize models of a horses, painted by young people aged 10–18, being an art installation outside the Hunt Museum in Limerick. The models, which are made of fibreglass, are kept inside overnight.

== Promotion ==
On 17 December 2010, the Rubberbandits appeared on The Late Late Show but did not perform the song. "If you go on The Late, Late Show they make you perform without cursing", main member Blindboy Boat Club said. "There are 17 instances of the word 'fuck' in the our song and we don't want to perform it without those curses so we're not doing it". RTÉ stated that the reason was that the programme was "fully booked" for live performances, and The Rubberbandits had been a "last-minute" addition. Instead, the programme aired a portion of the video.

== Video ==
The video, directed by Peter Foott, shows a wedding scene and used exterior shots from Milford Church, with interior shots filmed in a contemplative centre at the University of Limerick. The video features Irish model Madeline Mulqueen playing the sought-after bridesmaid at the wedding.

== Campaign for the Christmas number one ==
International press (such as the Spectator and CNBC) picked up on the phenomenon running blog pieces on the video and its content after its success on YouTube. Paddy Power placed the track at 8/11 and as favourite for Christmas number one single in Ireland. However, the effort fell short, finishing at #2 on the Christmas chart and losing to The X Factor winner Matt Cardle by over 25,000 sales, in part because the record companies failed to deliver the 25,000 extra singles to record stores until one day after the deadline for the Christmas charts. Most stores were sold out of the existing stocks, which originally had only 5,000 available.

== Charts ==
Chart (2010)	Peak position
Ireland (IRMA)	2
UK Singles (Official Charts)	160
