= Spies (band) =

- Genres: Jazz fusion
- Labels: Telarc
- Past members: Paul Freeman; Richard Hahn; Jon Crosse; Jay Anderson; David Witham

Spies was a jazz fusion band consisting of Paul Freeman, Richard Hahn, Jon Crosse, Jay Anderson and David Witham.

Their jazz fusion musical style is a blend of electronic, funk and rock.

By Way of the World, their 1990 album on the Telarc record label, was the first CD to use Stereo Surround encoding technology. Guest musicians include José Feliciano and percussionist Alex Acuña.

== Discography ==
- 1988: Music of Espionage
- 1990: By Way of the World
