= 3epkano =

Post-rock band

- Origin: Dublin, Ireland
- Genres: Post-rock; Film score
- Instruments: Guitar; Bass; Violin; Cello; Drums
- Labels: Smiling Politely Records
- Members: James Mackin; Lioba Petrie; Matthew Nolan; Cameron Doyle
- Website: 3epkanomusic.com

3epkano are a post-rock band from Dublin, Ireland, formed in 2004. The band have released three albums.

The band have composed and performed original live scores for numerous classics of silent cinema, including The Cabinet of Dr. Caligari, Metropolis, Faust, Diary of a Lost Girl, Nosferatu and Der Golem.

== Discography ==
Albums

- 3epkano (Smiling Politely, 2006)
- At Land (Smiling Politely, 2007)
- Hans the Reluctant Wolf Juggler (Smiling Politely, 2011)
