= Youth Mass =

Irish musical group

- Origin: Trim, County Meath, Ireland
- Genres: Alternative rock, indie rock, indie folk
- Years active: 2010–present
- Label: Lunatic Pursuit Records
- Members: Darren Mullarkey; Neil Nevins; Barry Mullarkey; William Gray; Gavin Mulhall
- Past members: Cathal Gantley; Gerry Ryan
- Website: thisisyouthmass.com

Youth Mass are an alternative rock band from County Meath, Ireland, formed in 2010. The line up is composed of Darren Mullarkey (vocals, guitar), Neil Nevins (guitar), Barry Mullarkey (bass, vocals), Gavin Mulhall (guitar, vocals) and William "Willy" Gray (drums).

== History (2010–2014) ==
Youth Mass formed when Neil Nevins & William "Willy" Gray formed the band in 2010, they quickly approached Darren Mullarkey and Cathal Gantley to form the first line up of the band.

They released their début EP "Misanthropy" in 2010. Their début album "Morning Run, Evening Sun", released on 4 April 2014, reached number 56 in the Irish Albums Chart.

== Band members ==
Current members

- Darren Mullarkey – Lead vocals, rhythm guitar (2010–present)
- Neil Nevins – Lead guitar (2010–present)
- Barry Mullarkey – Bass, vocals (2012–present)
- Gavin Mulhall - Lead guitar, vocals (2016–present)
- William "Willy" Gray - Drums, percussion (2010–present)

Former members

- Cathal Gantley – bass, backing vocals (2010–2011)
- Gerry Ryan – bass, backing vocals (2011–2012)

== Discography ==
Youth Mass discography
- Studio albums: 1
- EPs: 1
- Singles: 2
- Music videos: 2

=== Studio albums ===
Year	Album details	Peak chart positions
Year	Album details	IRL
2014	Morning Run, Evening Sun: Released: 4 April 2014; Label: Self Released; Formats: CD, Download	56
"—" denotes a title that did not chart.

=== EPs ===
Year	Album details
2010	Misanthropy: Released: 2010; Label: Self-released

== See also ==
- Irish rock
- Music of Ireland
