= Hermitage Green =

Hamlet in Cheshire, England

Coordinates: 53.44039°N 2.59460°W

- Location within Cheshire
- OS grid reference: SJ606939
  - London: 167.4 mi (269.4 km) SE
- Civil parish: Winwick
- Unitary authority: Warrington
- Ceremonial county: Cheshire
- Region: North West
- Country: England
- Sovereign state: United Kingdom
- Post town: Warrington
- Postcode district: WA2
- Police: Cheshire
- Fire: Cheshire
- Ambulance: North West

Hermitage Green is a hamlet near the village of Winwick in Cheshire, England. It is also the location of St Oswald's Well (grid reference SJ606939).

It is said that after the death of King Oswald 5th August AD642 that people came to visit the site where Oswald was killed and where the Well had sprung as Oswald fell. People collected soil from the spot where Oswald died and collected water from the well. It is claimed that both the soil and the water aided miracle cures to the sick and needy. Due to the number of people conveying this pilgrimage a Hermit was tasked with looking after the well site and collecting alms from the pilgrims as they passed by, collecting both soil and water. Some time in the 9th Century a wooden church was constructed for the giving of prayers the veneration of King Oswald, who was to becoming Saint Oswald, as he is now known.. Later in the 12th/13th century a more permanent stone church was built on the site, through it is said the construction of this church was moved by a pig to another location leading to the present site we now see today.

During 2006 the series Eleventh Hour, episode "Resurrection" was filmed in Hermitage Green Lane.
