= The Rubberbandits =

Comedy hip-hop duo from Limerick, Ireland

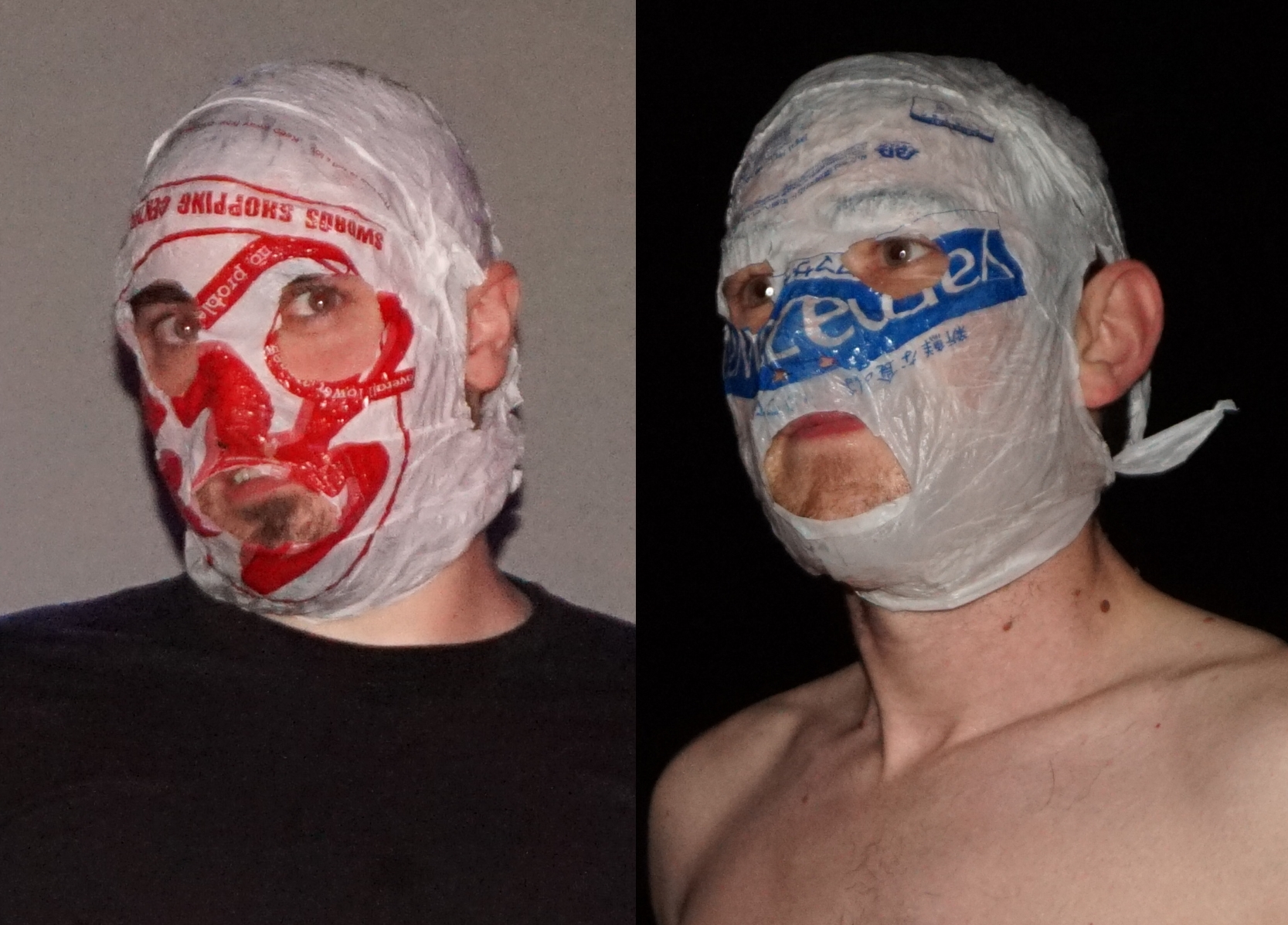
- Blindboy Boatclub (left) and Mr Chrome (right)

Background information
- Origin: Limerick, Ireland
- Genres: Comedy hip-hop; hip-hop; satire; prank phone calls
- Years active: 2000–2020
- Members: Blindboy Boatclub; Mr Chrome
- Website: www.youtube.com/user/Rubberbandits

The Rubberbandits were an Irish comedy hip-hop duo from Limerick. They consisted of Blindboy Boatclub (real name Dave Chambers) and Mr Chrome (sometimes Bobby Chrome; real name Bob McGlynn). During performances and interviews, they concealed their identities with masks made from plastic shopping bags. They were often accompanied by DJ Willie O'DJ, a silent masked caricature of local politician Willie O'Dea (portrayed by several consecutive men, including Spin South West DJ Paul Webb). The group described themselves as artists, and had dubbed their movement as "Gas Cuntism".

Chambers and McGlynn met while attending Ardscoil Rís, Limerick. Primarily a satirical stage and television act, they have performed throughout Ireland, the UK and the US with shows at events such as Electric Picnic, Oxegen and the Bulmers International Comedy Festival. The Rubberbandits first rose to prominence in December 2010, when their music video "Horse Outside" went viral on YouTube. They have since won awards for both their music and comedy. In 2011, the duo were declared "Best Irish Act" at the entertainment.ie awards, and also won an IFTA award for "Horse Outside".

The duo have also been involved in television, creating sketches for RTÉ, MTV and Channel 4, writing and starring in a Channel 4 comedy pilot, and writing and narrating the ITV2 series The Almost Impossible Gameshow. In 2016, they created The Rubberbandits' Guide to Everything, a mockumentary TV series for RTÉ.

Since 2017, Blindboy Boatclub has been host of The Blindboy Podcast, quickly becoming one of the most listened-to Irish podcasts, with 150,000 weekly listeners as of March 2018.

== History ==
=== Formation and initial recognition (2000–08) ===
Formed in the early 2000s, the Rubberbandits’ initial exposure arose from recorded prank phonecalls. These prank calls featured on a number of Irish and international radio stations, and became something of a memetic phenomenon in Ireland in the early 2000s. These phonecalls were their primary content until they became a musical stage act in 2007 - though they continued to use prank recordings as part of their stage act.

The Rubberbandits developed a comedic style that is satirical, surrealist and crude, drawing comparisons to satirist Flann O'Brien. The track "Up Da Ra" employs the literary device of the unreliable narrator to lambast the Irish phenomenon of armchair republicanism. Their work explores a number of themes that are of significance to Irish urban youth, including drug abuse, interaction with the Garda Síochána, and violence.

Nialler9 of State magazine included one of their tracks in his top 20 albums of 2008, and listed the Rubberbandits as his number two "international act to watch for 2009".

=== Television and YouTube exposure (2010–11) ===
The Rubberbandits' 2010 appearance at Electric Picnic was cited as one of the top picks of the event in The Dubliner supplement of the Evening Herald. This show followed their Friday night headline slot at the Little Big Arena. In September 2010, they were invited to speak at the Trinity College Philosophical Society. They were also later listed by the website Cracked.com as the top "most misunderstood" satirists.

In October 2010, they began a weekly slot on the RTÉ Two television comedy show Republic of Telly where their first clip "The Rubberbandits' Guide to Limerick" received over 100,000 YouTube views in the 7 days after broadcast.

Their music video "Horse Outside", featuring Irish model Madeline Mulqueen, was released on 8 December 2010 via iTunes. The video premiere was on Republic of Telly that night, and within 72 hours, it had reached 530,000 views on YouTube and became the top rated YouTube video in Ireland. In just over two weeks the video reached more than four million views. International press (such as the Spectator and CNBC) picked up on the phenomenon running blog pieces on the video and its content. Paddy Power placed the track at 8/11 and as favourite for Christmas number one single in Ireland. However, the effort fell short, losing to The X Factor winner Matt Cardle by over 25,000 sales. The Bandits' single was hampered by weather affecting deliveries and demand for physical stock that the distributors struggled to keep up with, as many stores were sold out of the existing stocks.

The Rubberbandits won an Irish Film & Television Award in 2011 for "Television Moment of the Year". Not appearing at the awards ceremony, the Bandits did an acceptance speech from "the moon" which was cut back from live broadcast on RTÉ but went viral on YouTube.

A subsequent single was released in February 2011. The single, "I Wanna Fight Your Father", focused on forbidden love and the lengths to which one might go to win over the disapproving family of a would-be lover. The video was posted on the Rubberbandits YouTube channel and went on sale in February 2011. Within 24 hours the video had garnered 170,080 YouTube views. The music video for an alternative version of the song as Gaeilge (in Irish) was released on YouTube on 3 March to promote Seachtain na Gaeilge. A new video Spastic Hawk emerged from the pair in October 2011, followed in November 2011, by the single Black Man.

=== Festival appearances (2011–2014) ===
The Rubberbandits have headlined large student events such as the NUI Galway Arts Ball, and as the closing act at the Trinity Ball in Dublin – where they performed after acts such as The Streets and Jessie J. Sold out shows at Irish venues such as the Tripod in Dublin, Pavilion in Cork and Black Box in Galway and appearances at UK Festivals, Relentless NASS, Reading, Latitude and Leeds followed throughout 2011 before a sold-out show at the Olympia in Dublin in October. In November 2011 they embarked on a 9 date UK tour playing venues such as King Tuts in Glasgow, the 02 in Oxford and XOYO in London.

An appearance at the Oxegen festival in July 2011 saw a crowd of over 20,000 gather.

The Rubberbandits wrote and performed three shorts for Channel 4's Comedy Blaps, with Sideline, who produced the shorts, becoming the first Irish production company to have a scripted comedy commissioned by the British TV station. These gained over a million views on line and were aired on Channel Four TV on Friday 18 August 2012 as part of the "Funny Fortnight" season.

On 2 December 2011, their debut album Serious about Men was released. It was reported on the Today FM Ray Darcy show as being the biggest pre-order Irish album of the year.

In August 2012 they performed a series of 12 shows at the world's biggest Arts Festival, The Edinburgh Fringe, and gained traction with sold-out shows, an appearance on BBC3's "Best of the Fringe", and a number of favourable reviews. On 25 August 2012 they were presented with the Malcolm Hardee "Most Original Act on the Fringe" Award.

In April 2014, a new theme tune for Russell Brand's web series The Trews was created and performed by the Rubberbandits.

== Television, film and video ==
The Rubberbandits have contributed sketches and music videos to the RTÉ comedy series Republic of Telly, including the "Horse Outside" video. In 2011, they created a series of webisodes for MTV. They also created a series of shorts titled Comedy Blaps for Channel 4, directed by Declan Lowney.

A half-hour Rubberbandits television pilot, also directed by Lowney, aired on Channel 4 in November 2012. However, the network did not order a full series.

In 2015, the Rubberbandits wrote and narrated the six-episode series The Almost Impossible Gameshow for ITV2. In December, a second series was announced. On 31 December, RTÉ2 aired The Rubberbandits Guide to 1916, a one-off documentary on the Easter Rising written and performed by the duo. Writing in the Irish Independent, critic Ian O'Doherty said of the documentary "The Rubberbandits may well have created the most informative programme on the Rising we will see all year. In fact, it may well be the best thing to appear on RTE this year, full stop. It will certainly be the funniest."

In 2017, the track "Dad's Best Friend" and its music video were used in T2 Trainspotting, the follow-up to the original Trainspotting film, directed by Danny Boyle.

McGlynn started a YouTube channel in 2022 under the name "Bobby Fingers", where he makes dioramas of embarrassing moments of celebrities.

== Art movement ==
Since 2014, the Rubberbandits have described themselves as artists rather than comedians. They refer to their movement as "Gas Cuntism", and have variously described it as "Dada and Fluxus on a horn" or "a form of Dole Queue Dada". Speaking to the Limerick Leader, Blindboy Boatclub stated that the "movement is now funded by the Arts Council of Ireland". In a 2016 interview, he summarised the purpose of the group's art as "Distracting ourselves from the inevitability of death, and having craic".

Writing for the Irish Independent, Brendan O'Connor noted the dark undercurrent and Situationist elements to the Rubberbandits' work, suggesting "Limerick Gothic" as a label for their aesthetic, to contrast with the "rural Irish gothic" of Patrick McCabe's The Butcher Boy. In 2015, O'Connor suggested that the Rubberbandits had inspired fashion designer Christopher Shannon's autumn/winter 2015 collection, which featured models wearing plastic bags on their heads. Noting the duo's transition from "hijacking" Spar, Tesco and Centra bags to using bags from JC's supermarket and Chicken Hut, O'Connor praised their interest in local communities and small business, and suggested that their manifestation of "pound shop rage" would lead to further influence in fashion.

As well as speaking on mental health issues, Blindboy Boatclub has criticised the art establishment in Ireland, saying that:

"[Galleries and museums] preach only to the converted. They remind us of churches, pure solemn and inhabited by very silent people who don't open their mouths, for fear that someone else might find out that they don't fully understand the art that's on display. Art galleries in Ireland are like big vegan churches, and the curator always wears black, like a priest, and the visitors are there for the free wine. Most people who attend Irish galleries are other artists, and they all whisper to each other about commissioning opportunities inside imaginary confessional boxes."

In 2015, the act represented Ireland at the Venice Biennale alongside fellow Irish artist Sean Lynch. In the same year, they contributed two videos, "Spastic Hawk" and "I Like to Shift Girls", to an installation in a Japanese art gallery. Boatclub explained that they were comfortable exhibiting in this case "because we believe the creative turn was not necessarily the works we had placed in the gallery but, rather, the act of participating." They have also performed musical comedy on the Abbey Theatre's Peacock stage and are credited as being the first to perform a comedy gig in Shakespeare's Globe theatre.

== Discography ==
=== Albums ===
Year	Album	Chart Positions	Certifications (sales thresholds)
Year	Album	IRL	Certifications (sales thresholds)
2011	Serious About Men	16	

=== Singles ===
Year	Single	Chart Positions		Album
Year	Single	IRL	UK	Album
2010	"Horse Outside"	2	160	Serious About Men
2011	"I Wanna Fight Your Father"	6	—	Serious About Men
2011	"Spastic Hawk"	—	—	Serious About Men
2011	"Black Man"	—	—	Serious About Men
2011	"Spoiling Ivan"	—	—	Serious About Men
2014	"Dad's Best Friend"	—	—	Non-album singles
2014	"Fellas"	—	—	Non-album singles
2017	"Donald In The Distance"	—	—	Non-album singles
2017	"Sonny"	—	—	Non-album singles
2020	"Bertie Ahern"	—	—	Non-album singles
2020	"Waiting"	—	—	Non-album singles
"—" denotes releases that did not chart.

== See also ==
- Kneecap (band)
