= List of Irish musical groups =

This is a list of bands from Ireland (Republic of Ireland and Northern Ireland).

== 0-9 ==
- The 4 of Us

== A ==
- Adebisi Shank
- The Aftermath
- A House
- Alphastates
- Altan
- Altar of Plagues
- An Emotional Fish
- And So I Watch You from Afar
- Anúna
- The Answer
- Ash
- Aslan

== B ==
- B*Witched
- The Baby Snakes
- The Bachelors
- Bagatelle
- Bell X1
- Bellefire
- Black Daisy
- The Blades
- Blaze X
- Blink
- The Blizzards
- The Boomtown Rats
- The Bothy Band
- Boyzone
- Brave Giant
- Basht.

== C ==
- Cactus World News
- The Chapters
- Channel One
- Cheap Freaks
- The Chieftains
- Ceoltóirí Chualann
- Clannad
- Compulsion
- The Coronas
- The Corrs
- The Cranberries
- Cruachan
- Cry Before Dawn
- Celtic Woman
- Celtic Thunder
- The Chalets
- Cruella de Ville

== D ==
- Danú
- Dead Cat Bounce
- Déanta
- Delorentos
- The Demise
- Dervish
- The Devlins
- Director
- Dirty Epics
- The Divine Comedy
- Dr. Strangely Strange
- Dublin City Ramblers
- The Dubliners
- The Duckworth Lewis Method

== E ==
- Eire Apparent
- Energy Orchard
- The Enemies
- Engine Alley

== F ==
- Fangclub
- The Fatima Mansions
- The Fat Lady Sings
- Fight Like Apes
- Florence Road
- Floyd Soul and the Wolf
- (The) Flying Column
- Follow My Lead
- Fontaines D.C.
- The Fountainhead
- Four Men and a Dog
- The Frames
- The Frank and Walters
- Fred
- Funky Junction
- The Fureys
- Future Kings of Spain

== G ==
- Gama Bomb
- Geasa
- General Fiasco
- Gilla Band
- giveamanakick
- Glyder
- The Golden Horde
- Goldfish Syndrome
- Gráda
- The Guggenheim Grotto
- Goats Don't Shave
- God Is An Astronaut

== H ==
- Hal
- Halves
- Hail the Ghost
- Ham Sandwich
- The High Kings
- The Hitchers
- Hogan
- Horslips
- Hothouse Flowers
- Hozier
- Hudson Taylor
- Humanzi

== I ==
- Industry
- Interference
- Into Paradise
- In Tua Nua
- The Irish Rovers
- Inhaler

== J ==
- The Jades
- Jape
- Jedward
- Jody Has A Hitlist
- Joyrider
- The Johnstons
- Juniper
- Just Mustard
- JJ72

== K ==
- Kerbdog
- Keywest
- Kíla
- Kneecap
- Kopek
- Kodaline

== L ==
- Lankum
- Lir
- Lovechild
- Le Galaxie
- Lúnasa
- Luv Bug
- Little Green Cars

== M ==
- Mael Mórdha
- Mama's Boys
- Mexican Pets
- Microdisney
- Midnight Well
- Mike Got Spiked
- Mise
- Mojo Fury
- Mono Band
- The Moondogs
- Moving Hearts
- The Murder Capital
- Music for Dead Birds
- My Bloody Valentine
- My Little Funhouse

== N ==
- NewDad
- Nightbox
- Nine Lies
- No Monster Club
- Nolans
- No Sweat

== O ==
- O Emperor
- Oppenheimer
- O.R.B. – (Formerly The Original Rude Boys)

== P ==
- The Pale
- Pay*Ola
- Pet Lamb
- Phoenix23
- Picturehouse
- Picture This
- Pillow Queens
- Planxty
- The Pogues
- Pony Club
- Power of Dreams
- Primordial
- Pugwash
- Pzazz

== R ==
- Rare
- The Radiators From Space
- Raglans
- Reemo
- Rend Collective
- The Redneck Manifesto
- Republic of Loose
- Revelino
- The Revs
- The Riptide Movement
- Rollerskate Skinny
- Rubyhorse

== S ==
- The Sands Family
- The Saw Doctors
- Scheer
- The Scratch
- The Script
- Scuba Dice
- Scullion
- Seo Linn
- Sephira
- September Girls
- Shouting at Planes
- Shrug
- Silent Running
- Size2shoes
- Skara Brae
- Skid Row
- Skruff
- Snow Patrol
- Something Happens
- Sprints
- Stand
- Stanley Super 800
- The Stars of Heaven
- Stiff Little Fingers
- St. Laurence O'Toole Pipe Band
- Stockton's Wing
- The Strypes
- The Stunning
- The Sultans of Ping FC
- Stump
- Sweeney's Men
- Sweet Savage

== T ==
- Tamalin
- Taste
- Tebi Rex
- That Petrol Emotion
- Therapy?
- The Thrills
- Them
- The Pogues
- The Tides
- Thin Lizzy
- This Club
- Those Nervous Animals
- Tiny Magnetic Pets
- Tír na nÓg
- Trinitones
- True Tides
- Turn
- Two Door Cinema Club

== U ==
- U2
- The Undertones
- Unquiet Nights

== V ==
- Villagers
- Virgin Prunes
- VNV Nation

== W ==
- The Walls
- Waterboys
- Walking on Cars
- Waylander
- We Should Be Dead
- Westlife
- Wild Youth
- Wilt
- Whipping Boy
- Wolfe Tones
- Wreck of the Hesperus
- Wyvern Lingo
