= Unquiet Nights =

Northern Irish/Italian/Canadian alternative rock band

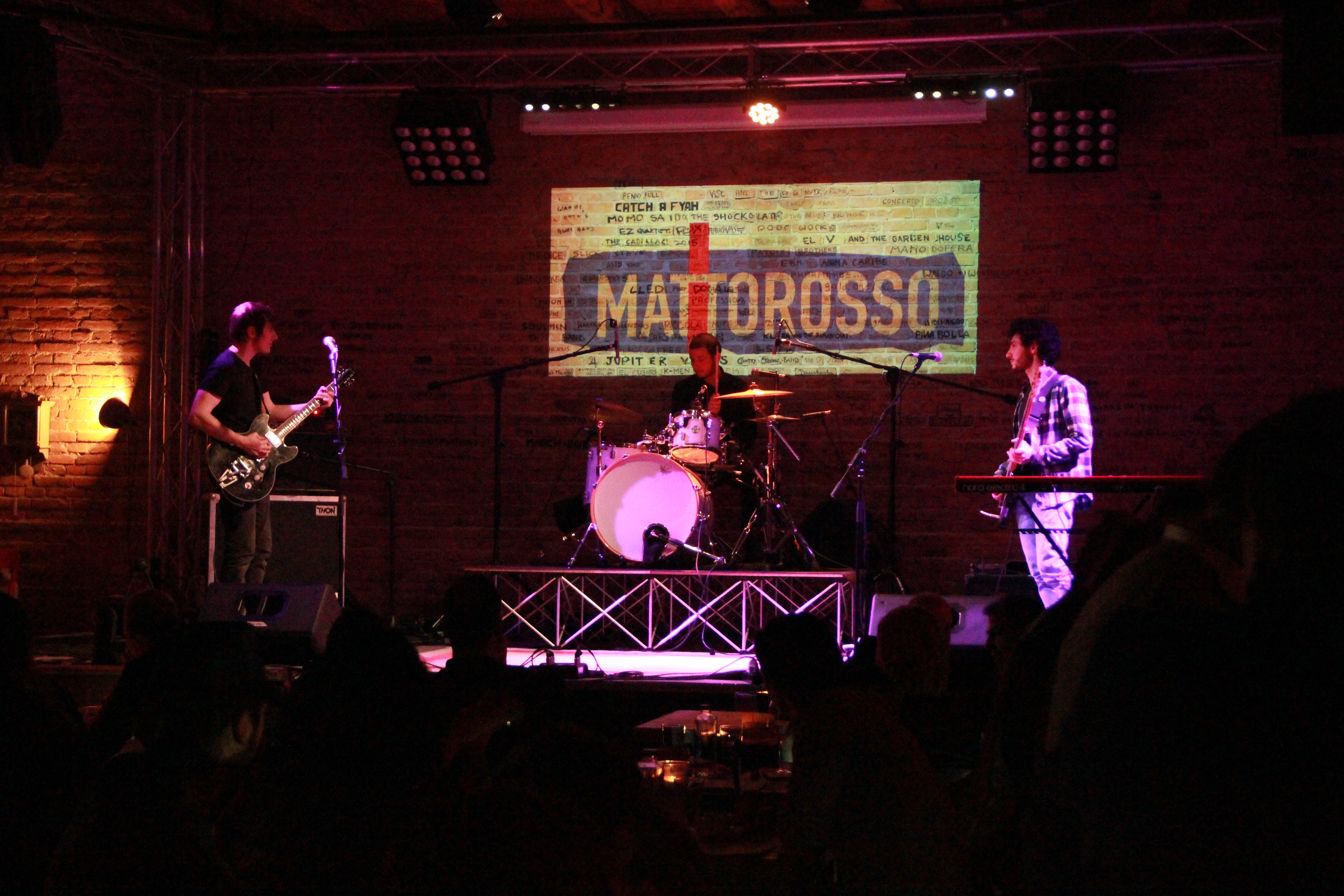

Background information
- Origin: Belfast, Northern Ireland, UK
- Genres: Rock; Alternative Rock; Rock & Roll; Progressive Rock; Indie
- Years active: 2010–present
- Labels: Essential Credential; Modirn Records; Backstreet
- Members: Luke Mathers; Rodger Firmin; Francesco Piciucchi
- Website: unquietnights.com

Unquiet Nights are a Northern Irish/Italian/Canadian alternative rock band formed in Belfast, Northern Ireland in 2010 by songwriter and guitarist Luke Mathers, and drummer Rodger Firmin. Francesco Piciucchi would join on keyboards & bass in 2013. They are known for their melodic rock sound and descriptive lyrical style, having released three studio albums and toured extensively.

== History ==
=== 2010–2012: Early career, 21st Century Redemption Songs ===
Following the breakup of Mathers and Firmin's previous band Lovechild, the two started collaborating on songs Mathers had been writing under the name Unquiet Nights. They recorded their first album mostly in a rehearsal space above the Limelight club in Belfast. Early singles like Burning The Tracks and Shoulda Said Something gained the band airplay on UK national radio stations including Absolute and BBC Radio 1. Their second single We Were The Ones also made inclusion on the "Best of 2010" sampler by Under The Radar magazine. The band played live frequently during this time including appearances on Balcony TV, and supports for acts including Bloc Party and Toploader.

Their debut album 21st Century Redemption Songs was released on 25 January 2012, with the physical release getting a launch on 24 February at The King's Head, Belfast in support of Paul Casey.

Tom Robinson was an early supporter of the band, calling 21st Century Redemption Songs a "fine debut album" on his BBC 6 Music Introducing Mixtape. Further support came from BBC Northern Ireland, RTÉ 2fm and Amazing Radio, and stations in Italy like Radio Popolare. They performed live sessions on Citybeat, Blast 106 as well as Salto 1 in the Netherlands and Radio Galileo in Italy. Touring continued including supports for Little Doses and appearances at Out Eco Festival, Marmore Rockin’ Festival and Youbloom Festival.

In addition to Mathers and Firmin, the live band around this time would often include musicians Francesco Piciucchi, Matteo Bussotti, John Rossi and Richie Montague. By the end of the tour for 21st Century Redemption Songs, the band had performed in nine countries, including more extensive touring between 2012 and 2014 in Italy, Austria, Netherlands, Slovakia, Germany, United Kingdom, Canada and Ireland.

=== 2015–2022: Postcards In Real Time ===
On 21 January 2015, the BBC Northern Ireland Late Show with Cherrie McIllwaine gave the first airing to George Best City, which was the B-side to new single Constellations of She. The single was released on 28 January 2015 ahead of the planned second album, but it was George Best City which gained more attention when Sky Italia used it in their documentary series "Federico Buffa racconta: Storie di campioni", in which journalist Federico Buffa explores the life of footballer George Best. The series debuted on 7 February 2015, with many repeats occurring in the years that followed across the Sky network. The official George Best Facebook page had been posting the song beginning on 26 January 2015.

On 9 February 2015 the band would do a live session for Blast 106, followed by a gig at Filthy McNasty's in their native Belfast. Ralph McLean would include George Best City on his BBC Northern Ireland show on 25 February 2015.

On 15 April 2015 Verlag Die Werkstatt would publish the book George Best: Der ungezähmte Fußballer by German Football Book of the Year winner Dietrich Schulze-Marmeling. Schulze-Marmeling referenced the lyrics of two Unquiet Nights songs George Best City and Don't Wanna Kill For Religion in the context of Best's cultural legacy, and drew from his interview with Mathers.

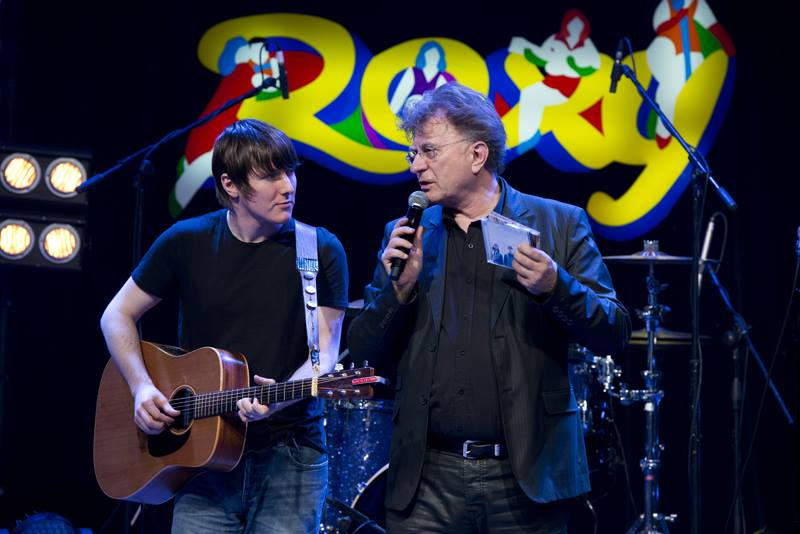
Unquiet Nights on Roxy Bar, Italy.

On the 3 May 2015 episode of Roxy Bar hosted by Red Ronnie, Mathers appeared alongside other guests including Enrico Ruggeri, Gianmarco Tognazzi and Piotta. New songs George Best City and Don't Wanna Kill For Religion were performed on the main episode, and Constellations of She on the pre-show. In the interview, Mathers confirmed that the band's second album was due before the end of the year.

A second single in advance of the new album was released on 20 July 2015. Love Leave Your Mark on Me was described as "a huge step forward" and "an anthemic offering" by Hot Press. The band spoke at this time about their preference for releasing their new singles on USB Flash drive as well as other formats so as to offer lossless audio.

Unquiet Nights on Sky Sports 1, Italy.

The following day on 21 July 2015 the band made a live appearance on Sky Sports 1 in Milan for an episode of Calciomercato. The Sky series Buffa Racconta: Storie di Campioni had been running since February, resulting in Mathers and Piciucchi appearing on Calciomercato to discuss the George Best episode in which the band's music featured. The episode was hosted by Alessandro Bonan, who discussed Best as a player, modern football and the band's own career in music. Bonan then asked the band to cover Oh, Pretty Woman by Roy Orbison to end the show. The music video for current single Love Leave Your Mark on Me was also featured on the episode.

Tom Robinson would play George Best City on his BBC 6 Music Introducing Mixtape for 24 August 2015. Ahead of the album release, on 29 November 2015 Postcards In Real Time was the featured album of the week on KCLR 96FM's Irish Music Show, with host Roddie Cleere debuting several new songs from the album including Greatest Revival and Destiny Does The Splitstep.

Postcards in Real Time was released on 11 December 2015. Having been recorded mostly at Manor Park Studios in Northern Ireland throughout 2015, the album was noted for its alternative rock sound with Hot Press comparing it to "Gin Blossoms jamming with Jesus and Mary Chain". The band would promote the album with further sessions for Dublin City FM and Roadie TV, and gigs in Dublin as well as Turin and Treviso in Italy.

On 18 August 2016 the band released the music video for Don't Wanna Kill For Religion, filmed on the roof of the Europa Hotel in Belfast. In the summer of 2017, the band were building their own studio called Credential Sound, and also played a series of tour dates in England, including the Daventry Weekender at the Daventry Arts Festival.

=== 2018–2022: First Ten (2012–2022) ===
The band would then release a trio of singles beginning with Promise of You on 16 January 2018. National award-winning DJ Roddie Cleere would make Promise of You his Song of the Week on his Irish Music Show on KCLR 96FM on 11 February 2018, followed by an in studio session. Hot Press would describe Promise of You as "a robust rocker, driven by pounding drums and a massive chorus". The next single was Young Believers, released on 18 April 2018 with a first play on Roddie Cleere's Irish Music Show during an in-studio interview on 10 April. Journalist Stuart Bailie compared Young Believers favourably to Pearl Jam on 18 April 2018 episode of BBC Across The Line. The third single of this trio was Four Winds, released on 14 June 2019. It was described by Edwin McFee of Hot Press as their "darkest offering to date" with references to Dave Gilmour influenced guitar work, while Peter McGoran praised its "surging chorus to die for".

On 24 January 2022, the band released a compilation called First Ten (2012–2022) to mark ten years since their debut album was released. It included the three singles Promise of You, Young Believers and Four Winds that had been released in the lead up to First Ten, as well as a new single recorded for First Ten called In Spite of it All.

=== 2024-Present: Seasons in Exile ===
On 29 December 2023, the single Diamond and the Missing Son was released in advance of the band's third studio album Seasons in Exile. The track was praised for its "sincerity and anthemic quality" by Record World, and for its "crystal clear vocals and scratchy guitar" by Hot Press.

On 19 January 2024, the band released their third studio album, Seasons in Exile, with The Belfast Telegraph stating that it was "brimming with belters", and comparing it to Tom Petty and the Heartbreakers. The Sunday Life called it "an absorbing and rewarding record". The album received coverage by Cashbox, Chordblossom, Pure M, Next Wave Magazine, Great Music Stories, OriginalRock.net, Tinnitist, Canadian Beats, Maximum Volume, as well as SiriusXM DJ Eric Alper. Radio support for Seasons in Exile included TotalRock, and Kerrang! Radio. The second single from this album This Is My Oxygen would reach No. 4 on the UK Independent Indie Radio Alliance Chart.

The band gave several interviews about how Seasons in Exile was the furthest exploration into Progressive Rock that they had done to that point, with all the songs on the album forming one singular story. The progressive nature of this album was noted widely in the reviews at the time, with Sunday Life saying "the album continues the story of the two titular characters in Diamond and the Missing Son and marks a bold new chapter for the band".

== Musical Style ==
The band's style has been described as Rock & Roll, Indie Rock, and Progressive Rock. They have been compared to Genesis, Tom Petty and the Heartbreakers, The Rolling Stones, Feeder, Ghost, Blue Öyster Cult, The Gaslight Anthem, Bloc Party, The Strypes, The Jesus and Mary Chain, Gin Blossoms and The Charlatans. Mathers' guitar work has been compared to David Gilmour.

Despite these comparisons, publications such as Record World note that Unquiet Nights are "a group everybody claims to get but nobody can seem to pin down".

The band have often spoken of being influenced by bands like Genesis, The Rolling Stones and Tom Petty, among many others. Mathers has spoken of recording much of the band's output from the second album onwards using a guitar pick given to him by Tom Petty after a gig in Italy in 2012, and that the band's second album Postcards In Real Time features Tom Petty and the Heartbreakers drummer Steve Ferrone on two songs. Roy Orbison was Mathers' first musical influence, leading to being asked to cover Oh, Pretty Woman on Sky Sport 1.

== Media and literature ==
Unquiet Nights have been featured in international television, sports media, and literature. In 2015, the band's song George Best City featured in the final scene of the Sky Italia documentary Buffa Racconta: Storie di Campioni George Best. Hosted by journalist Federico Buffa, it focuses on the life of George Best, and broadcast in several countries across the Sky network.

The band have made live appearances on national TV including the Sky Sport 1 show Calciomercato – L'Originale, hosted by Alessandro Bonan and Riccardo Trevisani, and Roxy Bar hosted by Red Ronnie.

In literature, the band is discussed in the biography George Best: Der ungezähmte Fußballer by the "German Football Book of the Year" winner Dietrich Schulze-Marmeling which was published by Verlag Die Werkstatt.

The band's music often appears in sports media, including Surfline TV, Alli Sports (NBC) and O'Neills.

== Members ==
=== Current members ===
- Luke Mathers – lead vocals, guitar (2010–present)
- Rodger Firmin – drums (2010–13, 2017–present)
- Francesco Piciucchi – keyboards, bass guitar (2013–present)

=== Former members ===
- Richie Montague – bass (2011–2012; touring)
- John Rossi – bass, keyboards, backing vocals (2011–2013)
- Matteo Bussotti – drums (2013–2015; touring)
- Francesco Giacomini – drums (2016; touring)

== Discography ==
=== Studio albums ===
- 21st Century Redemption Songs (2012)
- Postcards in Real Time (2015)
- Seasons in Exile (2024)

=== Compilation Albums ===
- First Ten (2012–2022) (2022)
