= Demise (disambiguation) =

Demise is a legal term for a transfer of an estate, especially by lease.

Demise may also refer to:

- Death, the permanent cessation of all biological functions that sustain a particular living organism
- A demise charter is a form of bareboat charter in which the charter period may last for many years
- Demise Williams (born 1964), American football player

== Technology ==
- Demise of a satellite, the complete breakup and burnup of an artificial satellite upon entry into a planetary atmosphere

== Literature and the arts ==
- Demise (The Legend of Zelda), the main villain in The Legend of Zelda: Skyward Sword
- Demise: Rise of the Ku'tan, a 1999 computer role-playing game
- The Demise, an Irish punk rock band
- "The Demise", a song by Hawkwind from their 1985 album The Chronicle of the Black Sword
- Demise (Missing Foundation album), 1989
- Demise, a 1991 album by Orlík
- Demise (Nachtmystium album), 2006
