= Stand =

Stand, Stands or The Stand may refer to:

== Books, film, and television ==
- The Stand, a 1978 novel by Stephen King
  - The Stand (1994 miniseries), based on the novel
  - The Stand (comics) (2008–2012), based on the novel
  - The Stand (2020 miniseries), based on the novel
- Stand! (film), a 2019 Canadian musical film
- The Stand (2024 film), a documentary film
- Stand, a supernatural power in the manga, anime, and game series JoJo's Bizarre Adventure
- STAND, an organization in the anime Virus Buster Serge

== Music ==
=== Groups ===
- Stand (Irish band), a New York–based Dublin four-piece band
- The Stands, English band

=== Albums ===
- Stand (Avalon album)
- Stand (Breaking the Silence album)
- Stand (Michael W. Smith album)
- Stand!, by Sly and the Family Stone

=== Songs ===
- "Stand" (Jewel song)
- "Stand" (Lenny Kravitz song)
- "Stand" (Poison song)
- "Stand" (Rascal Flatts song)
- "Stand" (R.E.M. song)
- "Stand!" (song), by Sly and the Family Stone
- "Stand", by Candlebox on the album Into the Sun
- "Stand", by Petra on the album Jekyll & Hyde
- "The Stand" (song), by Mother Mother
- "The Stand", by the Alarm
- "The Stand", by Hillsong United on the album United We Stand
- "The Stand", by Michael W. Smith on the album Stand
- "The Stand (Man or Machine)", by the Protomen on the album The Protomen

== Objects ==
- A kiosk:
  - Fruit stand
  - Hot dog stand
  - Lemonade stand
- A support or holder, such as:
  - Christmas tree stand
  - Cymbal stand
  - Kickstand of a bicycle or motorcycle
  - Music stand
  - Retort stand, a laboratory equipment
  - Speaker stands
- Tree stand, a platform used in hunting

== Organizations ==
- STAND (organization) (originally Students Taking Action Now: Darfur), a student activist group under Aegis Trust
- STAND (Scientology), acronym of "Scientologists Taking Action Against Discrimination", a front group for Scientology

== Other uses ==
- Stand, Greater Manchester, a residential area in England
- Stand Watie (1806–1871), Cherokee Native American chief and Confederate brigadier general in the American Civil War
- Stand (cricket), a relationship between two players
- Stand (drill pipe), two or three joints of pipe connected together on a drilling rig
- Standing, the act of assuming an upright position
- Bus stand, where public service vehicles are parked between journeys, or specific stops in a bus station
- Forest stand, a group of trees
- The Stand Comedy Club, in Edinburgh, Glasgow and Newcastle upon Tyne
- Stand magazine, founded by Jon Silkin

== See also ==
- Standing frame, assistive technology supporting a person who could not otherwise stand erect
- Stand-in (disambiguation)
