= Oubliette (disambiguation) =

An oubliette is a type of dungeon.

Oubliette can also refer to:

- Oubliette (The X-Files), an episode of The X-Files
- The Oubliette, a 1914 film starring Lon Chaney
- Oubliette, a 1977 role-playing video game for the mainframe computers
- The Oubliette, a spaceship-like prison that appears in Metroid Prime Hunters
- The Oubliette, a setting from The Quantum Thief
- Oubliette Midas, a character in Marvel Comics
