= David Allen (game designer) =

American video game designer

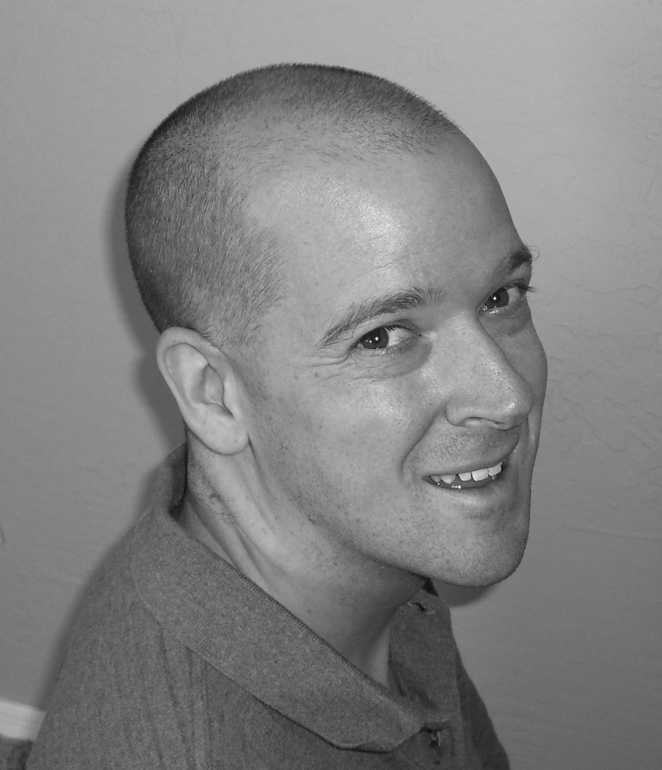
- Born: July 30, 1972 (age 54); Denver, Colorado
- Occupations: video game designer, entrepreneur
- Website: www.requnix.com

David Allen (born July 30, 1972) is a video game designer and entrepreneur who is most recently known as the creator of Alganon, a fantasy based MMORPG developed by Quest Online, a company he co-founded in 2006.

== Game designer and entrepreneur ==
Born in Denver, Colorado, Allen grew up in Bellevue, Washington where he actively played on the PLATO network, beginning of his interest in online gaming and programming. With a background of programming and development on the Windows platform, his first retail creation was Mordor: The Depths of Dejenol (released 1994) a dungeon-romp built for Windows 3.x. The sequel was a more evolved version of Mordor called Demise: Rise of the Ku'tan (released 2000). While finishing Demise, Allen created the concept for the MMORPG called Horizons: Empire of Istaria and founded Artifact Entertainment in 1999 where he proceeded to raise capital and build the game, relocating to Mesa, Arizona in the process. Allen departed Artifact in July 2001. He founded Pharaoh Productions later in 2001 where he designed a game called Dominion which was a mix of MMORPG and Diablo play style, but featuring dynamic content. Allen was unable to secure funding for Pharaoh and closed the company in 2004. He returned to the industry in 2006 relocating to Chandler, Arizona and co-founding a new company called Quest Online where he created a MMOG called Crusade which was later renamed to Alganon.

Alganon launched in December 2009 with a social network called MyAlganon that included an online Library system where players could browse game data including items, quests, and characters.

== Other activities ==
Allen has written two published books. The Visual Basic 4 Network Gaming Adventure Set, was published in 1995, which showed readers how to create games in Visual Basic 4. He also published a work of fiction called Eight Days through Amazon Kindle in 2013. He also writes and publishes stories on a personal website called StoryBag.

== Companies created ==
- VB Designs (1996)
- Artifact Entertainment (1999)
- Pharaoh Productions (2001)
- Quest Online (2006)

== Ludography ==
Video Game Credits
Year	Game	Ref(s)
1995	Mordor: The Depths of Dejenol	
2000	Demise: Rise of the Ku'tan	
2003	Horizons: Empire of Istaria	
2009	Alganon	
Canceled	Dominion	
