= The No. 1s =

Band in Ireland

The #1s
- Origin: Dublin, Ireland
- Genres: Power pop, garage rock
- Years active: 2011–present
- Labels: Art for Blind
- Members: Eddie Kenrick; Seán Goucher; Conor Lumsden; Cian Nugent
- Website: thenumberones.tumblr.com

The #1s are a power pop band from Dublin, Ireland. The band formed in 2011 by members of Irish groups Crowd Control, Bang Bros, the Pacifics, Cheap Freaks and Cian Nugent and the Cosmos. As of 2014, the band was made up of Eddie Kenrick (vocals and guitar), Seán Goucher (guitar and vocals), Cian Nugent (bass guitar and vocals) and Conor Lumsden (drums). The band announced its arrival with the release of the Italia '90 EP. Released on cassette, the EP contained "Anything", "Tell Me Why" and "Sixteen".

In June 2012, the #1s contributed "I Wish I Was Lonely" to the Popical Island 3 compilation album. In November of the same year, the band released its self-titled debut EP. The 7" single featured the aforementioned "I Wish I Was Lonely", backed with "He's Too Good for Everyone Else But He's Not Good Enough for You".

== Discography ==
Year	Release	Label
2011	Italia '90 (cassette)	Self-released
2012	The #1s	Art for Blind
