= Criminal IQ Records =

Independent record label based in Chicago, Illinois

Criminal IQ Records is an independent record label based in Chicago, Illinois, founded by Jon Babbin (co-founder of Ruthless Records) and Darius Hurley to facilitate releases from Chicago's no-wave/punk scene that began in around 2003. Notable releases include garage pop-punk band M.O.T.O.'s LP Kill Moto, the Functional Blackouts' self-titled LP, and dark wave psyche punk band Vee Dee's Furthur LP.

Early releases were met with critical acclaim from underground music zines such as Maximumrocknroll and Horizontal Action, and more mainstream publications such as Arthur, Thrasher, Kerrang!, and Concussion Magazine. The records received airplay and occasionally topped charts on college radio stations around the country, as well as getting airplay on the BBC via the late John Peel Show. Criminal IQ later signed The Krunchies and all-female band The Manhandlers. The Manhandlers' compilation album Maybe Chicago was co-released with Proto-Mersh Records, and featured original sound recordings by the Ponys, the Baseball Fury, the Tyrades, Twat Vibe, White Outs, Busy Kids, and the Hot Machines.

In 2006, Criminal IQ relinquished its Chicago-only policy and released singles by Texas hardcore band Army of Jesus, Milwaukee's Bear Proof Suit, Green Bay, and Portuguese punk band The Youths.

== Discography ==
- M.O.T.O. (a.k.a. Masters of the Obvious) - Kill Moto LP (LP co-released with Little Teddy Recordings) Jun 2003
- Mushuganas / The Phenoms - Mushuganas / The Phenoms EP 2003
- Functional Blackouts - Functional Blackouts LP Oct 2003
- The Manhandlers - Maybe Chicago - Various Artists Compilation Jan 2004
- The Krunchies - Interrobang EP Mar 2004
- Vee Dee - Furthur LP 2004
- The Manhandlers - The Manhandlers LP 2004
- M.O.T.O. - Single File LP 2004
- The Krunchies - In De Winkel LP 2005
- Rotten Fruits - Abomination EP 2005
- M.O.T.O. - Raw Power LP 2005
- I Attack - American Dream EP 2005
- The Pedestrians - Future Shock LP 2005
- The Functional Blackouts - The Severed Tongue Speaks For Everyone LP 2006
- Army of Jesus - Book Bomb EP 2006
- Bear Proof Suit - Science is Dead EP 2006
- The Gravetones - Dig It! LP 2006
- Canadian Rifle - Canadian Rifle EP 2007
- The Youths - The Youths EP 2007
- Vee Dee - Glimpses of Another World EP 2007
- Curtains! - War Paint EP 2007
- Pink Reason - Throw It Away EP 2007
- Out With A Bang! - Few Beers Left But Out of Drugs 7-inch EP 2007
- Sick Jump! - Everything Hurts LP 2007
- The Effigies - Reside LP 2007
- The Yolks - Introducing EP 2008
- Terrible Twos - Terrible Twos LP 2008
- Claw Toe - Ingrown Ego 2009
- Useless Children - Skin / Nameless EP 2010
- Catburglars - Catburglars LP 2010
- Claw Toe - Claw Toe EP 2012
- Claw Toe - Goblin Creme LP 2016

== See also ==
- List of record labels
- Chicago Record Labels
