= Love child =

Love child may refer to:

- Love child, a euphemism for a child born out of wedlock; see Legitimacy (family law)

== Film ==
- Love Child (1982 film), a film based on a true story, starring Beau Bridges and Amy Madigan
- Love Child (2011 film), a Dominican Republic film
- Love Child (2014 film), a South Korean-American documentary film
- Love Child (2019 film), a Turkish-Iranian documentary film
- Love Child (2024 film), a Philippine drama romantic comedy film

== Music ==
=== Performers ===
- Lovechild (band), a Northern Ireland indie rock band
- Love Child (band), an American alternative rock band
- Q-Tip (musician), formerly MC Love Child, American rapper

=== Albums ===
- Love Child (The Supremes album) or the title song (see below), 1968
- Love Child (Sweet Sensation album), 1990
- Lovechild (album) or the title song, by Curved Air, 1990
- Love Child (Ella Riot EP), 2011

=== Songs ===
- "Love Child" (song), by Diana Ross & the Supremes, 1968
- "Love Child" (Goodbye Mr. Mackenzie song), 1990
- "Love Child", by Accept from Balls to the Wall, 1984
- "Love Child", by Arrows, 1976
- "Love Child", by Deep Purple from Come Taste the Band, 1975
- "Love Child", by Swing Out Sister from Get in Touch with Yourself, 1992
- "Lovechild", by Talisman from Genesis, 1993

== Other media ==
- Love Child (TV series), a 2014–2017 Australian drama series
- Love Child, a 1986 novel by Andrew Neiderman
