= DVD Show =

DVD Show is a Canadian movie review series, which airs on mentv, CLT and SUN TV. In 2009, the series is now hosted by Jenny Steele and Max Sinclair, with two guest reviewers every week. Heath McCoy previously hosted the series but left when its new season premiered. The series made a move to HD in 2009., the series reviews movies and television programs newly released on DVD and re-releases on Blu-ray, suggesting viewers to Buy, Rent, or Skip.
