= Turn the Lights Out (album) =

Studio album by the Ponys
- Released: March 20, 2007
- Recorded: 2006
- Genres: Indie rock, garage rock
- Length: 41:40
- Label: Matador
- Producers: John Agnello, The Ponys

The Ponys chronology
Celebration Castle (2005)	Turn the Lights Out (2007)

Professional ratings
Aggregate scores
Source	Rating
Metacritic	68/100
Review scores
Source	Rating
AllMusic	4/5 stars
The Austin Chronicle	3/5 stars
The Guardian	4/5 stars
NME	4/5 stars
Pitchfork	7.7/10
Spin	3.5/5 stars

Turn the Lights Out is the third album from American indie/garage rock band, the Ponys. It was released on March 20, 2007. It was the first album from the band to be released on Matador Records, having been previously signed to In the Red Records.

== Track listing ==
All songs written by Jered Gummere, Melissa Elias, Nathan Jerde, and Brian Case.

1. "Double Vision" - 3:37
2. "Everyday Weapon" - 2:16
3. "Small Talk" - 4:13
4. "Turn the Lights Out" - 2:36
5. "1209 Seminary" - 3:06
6. "Shine" - 4:21
7. "Kingdom of Hearts" - 2:04
8. "Poser Psychotic" - 3:45
9. "Exile on My Street" - 2:21
10. "Harakiri" - 3:28
11. "Maybe I'll Try" - 2:56
12. "Pickpocket Song" - 6:52

== Notes ==
- The iTunes version includes the bonus track "Something in the Air".
- The song "Double Vision" was featured in EA Sports game NHL 08, played in Entourage, season four, episode "Dream Team" and featured in GMC's 2010 Terrain commercial.
