= Bleech 9:3 =

Irish rock band

- Bleech 9:3 performing live in 2025

Background information
- Origin: Dublin, Ireland
- Genres: Alternative rock; grunge; indie rock
- Years active: 2022–present
- Label: Polydor
- Spinoff of: JaVill; Basht.
- Members: Barry Quinlan; Sam Duffy; James Quinlan; Luke O'Neill
- Website: bleech93.com

Bleech 9:3 are an Irish rock band from Dublin. Formed in 2022, its founding lineup was brothers and former JaVill members Barry "Baz" Quinlan (vocals, guitar) and James Quinlan (bass), alongside Basht. members Sam Duffy (guitar) and Luke O'Neill (drums). In 2024, they relocated to London, then released a string of singles beginning in October 2025. They quickly gained commercial attention following a string of international headline tour dates and slots supporting bands in the Windmill scene. They have been noted by publications including The Guardian, Official Charts and BBC as one of the fastest growing rock bands of the mid-2020s. In April 2026, they signed to Polydor Records, who released their self-titled debut EP the same month.

== History ==
Sam Duffy performing in 2025

Sam Duffy (guitar) and Barry "Baz" Quinlan (vocals, guitar) met in Dublin in 2022 when Duffy's Alcoholics Anonymous sponsor became Quinlan, although Quinlan had already seen Duffy's band Basht. perform. In a 2026 interview DIY, Quinlan explained that they bonded over "Finding out the truth and living in the truth became a matter of life and death to me, as I was trying to recover from my addiction. It was that serious and it was that important". At the time, Duffy was a member of the band Basht, while Quinlan was a part of JaVill, they completed their lineup with Duffy's bandmate Luke O'Neill (drums) and Quinlan's brother and bandmate James Quinlan (bass). They took the name "Bleech 9:3" from a song Barry had written named "Bleach". "Bleach" is a corruption of bleach, referencing a new "clean start", while "9:3" points to the Bible verse Mark 9:3, which is discussing the transfiguration of Jesus. They began performing locally in pubs and grassroots music venues.

In 2024, the band moved to London. On 8 October 2025, they released their debut single "Ceiling", supporting it with a headline tour of Western Europe between 9 and 23 October. On 10 November, they released the single "Jacky". Between 10 and 13 November, they toured England and Ireland supporting Shame. On 19 January 2026, they released the single "Cannonball". In April 2026, they signed to Polydor Records Between 20 April and 21 May, they toured Western Europe. On 21 April, they released the single "Underrated", announcing it would be a part of their debut self-titled EP.

In May, they performed at The Great Escape Festival. On 10 June, they opened for Nick Cave and the Bad Seeds at Malahide Castle. In July, they performed at Tramlines Festival. On 19 August, they released the single "Figure 8", originally premiered on the New Music Show for BBC Radio 1. The single was produced by Dan Carey. That month, they performed at Other Voices Festival in Derry, Kendal Calling and Reading and Leeds Festivals. On 2 October, they released the single "Tourniquet". It was hailed by BBC Radio 1 DJ Jack Saunders as a "Hottest Record In The World". At the same time, they announced it would be a part of their debut album Bleed, but did not specify a release date.

Between 3 and 21 February 2027, they will headline a tour of the United States and Australia, then between 21 April and 22 May headline a tour of Europe. They will perform at Laneway Festival 2027.

== Musical style and legacy ==
Critics have categorised Bleech 9:3's music as alternative rock, grunge and indie rock. They incorporate elements of alternative metal, nu metal, sludge metal, shoegaze post-punk, and Midwest emo. Nialler9 called them "neo-grunge", while Nialler9 called them "alt-grunge". They are particularly indebted to 1990s styles of alternative rock, with Gods in the TV calling them "a 21st Century Pearl Jam".

They have cited influences including Fontaines D.C., U2, Kings of Leon, Arctic Monkeys, Gorillaz, Radiohead, Coldplay, Green Day, Neil Young, Bob Dylan, David Gray, Alex G, Wu-Lu, Nirvana and Wunderhorse. Duffy has cited influences on his guitar playing as including Mike McCready of Pearl Jam and Billy Corgan of the Smashing Pumpkins.

Kerrang! writer Rishi Shah called them "Arguably the most talked-about new guitar act of 2026". The same year, Hot Press writer Riccardo Dwyer called them "the hottest prospect in Irish music right now". The Soundboard said they "emerg[ed] seemingly out of nowhere but already tipped to the moon and back". Northern Exposure credited their sudden rise to their "energetic live performances and a string of emotionally-charged singles", while When the Horn Blows credited them as "mainly spreading through word of mouth". The UK Official Charts named them as "Ones To Watch".

In 2026, So Young writer Alex Dallas said their releases have "summit [sic] the underground post-punk scene". DIY writer Hannah Breen called them "the darker, grittier end" of the Speedy scene. They were also associated with the "indie poo" scene. Clunk noted them as a part of an emerging wave of dissonant indie rock and alternative rock bands incorporating elements of Midwest emo, alongside Hudson Freeman, Gurriers and Basht. They are a part of a wave of Irish acts gaining international popularity during the 2020s, alongside Kneecap, Fontaines D.C. Sprints and CMAT. In a 2026 interview, Duffy said of the wave, "It’s the most inspiring thing – really... You get this sense of connection, of relatability, like, we started out in the same place and had the same experiences."

== Discography ==
- Bleech 9:3 (2026)

== Members ==
- Barry "Baz" Quinlan – vocals, guitar
- Sam Duffy – guitar
- James Quinlan – bass
- Luke O'Neill – drums
