= M.O.T.O. =

Garage punk band from New Hampshire, USA

M.O.T.O. (Masters Of The Obvious)
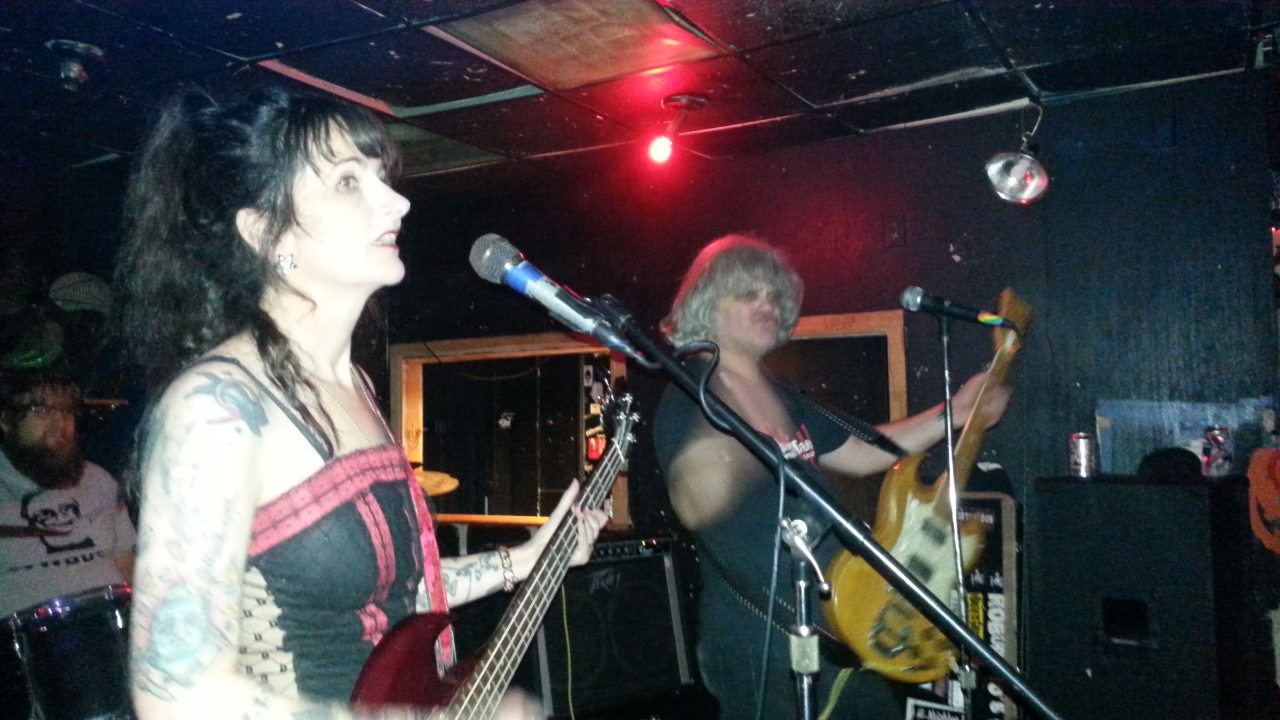
- M.O.T.O. performing in Columbus, Ohio, 2015. Left to right: guest drummer Big Nick, McDonough, Caporino.

Background information
- Origin: New Orleans, Louisiana
- Genres: Garage punk, pop-punk, indie rock
- Instruments: Vocals, guitar, drums
- Years active: 1981–present

M.O.T.O. (Masters of the Obvious) is an American garage punk band currently based in New Hampshire. Formed in New Orleans in 1981 by Paul Caporino, the lineup of the band has seen many changes over the years, with Caporino being the only consistent member. The band has recorded many albums, singles and CDs, including several albums for the Chicago-based record label Criminal IQ Records.

== History ==
M.O.T.O. has existed in some form for over 45 years. Over that time, the band has undergone numerous lineup changes, but it has always functioned primarily as a platform for Paul Caporino's songwriting, a repertoire that includes hundreds of songs in a variety of genres such as pop, punk rock, metal, soul, noise music, garage rock and new wave.

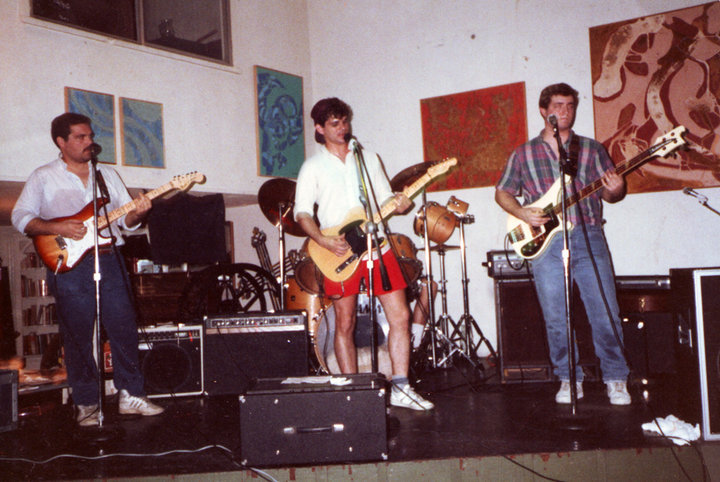
Original MOTO Cafe Brazil circa 1984 - Left to right: Mike Tomeny, Paul Caporino, Donald Ward (mostly hidden behind Caporino), Jeff Tomeny

=== Original lineup ===
M.O.T.O. was formed in New Orleans, Louisiana in 1981. The original lineup consisted of Mike Tomeny on guitar, his brother Jeff Tomeny on guitars and vocals and Don Ward on drums in addition to Caporino on guitar and vocals. This edition of the band first performed the songs "Skeletons Need Their Sleep" (composed by Jeff Tomeny) and "Satan Always Calls Collect" (by Tomeny and Caporino), which would reappear on several 7-inch EPs in later years.

Because M.O.T.O. recorded and performed live somewhat infrequently, Paul Caporino began to record a series of cassette albums without the assistance of the other members of the band. The tapes were originally intended as demos, but Caporino was so satisfied with the results that he decided to distribute them to the public. These tapes included Turn Your Head and Cough, BOLT! (short for "Best of Lent Tape"), Rock, Roll & Dismember and MOTOERECTUS. Caporino wrote all the songs and played all the instruments on the cassettes, layering multiple guitars, bass, lead and harmony vocals over a Mattel Synsonics drum machine. These early tapes feature many songs that would reappear in live shows and studio recordings over the years, including "Midnight at the Guantanamo Room", "Dick About It", "Month of Sundays", and "I'm Infected". The tapes showcased Caporino's offbeat and sometimes vulgar sense of humor along with his extensive knowledge of the history of popular music. The music contained references to the Beatles, the Kinks, Bob Dylan, Donovan, Led Zeppelin, The Jam, Black Flag, Hüsker Dü, Judas Priest and many other artists.

The original lineup also made a few recordings as a band, which were collected on the QUASIMOTO cassette. When, in 1987, the original lineup disbanded, Caporino continued M.O.T.O. as a trio backed by Brad Brewster on drums and Greg Fisk on bass. This edition of the band played more live dates than the original lineup, but recorded very little.

=== M.O.T.O. as a duo ===
Shortly thereafter, Caporino moved to Somerville, Massachusetts, in the greater Boston area. There he formed a new version of the band with drummer Beck Dudley which lasted until 1993 and produced a number of 7-inch EPs, three home-recorded cassettes (Neon Bone!, 1000 Years of Rock'N'Roll, and Talk of M.O.T.O.) and a full-length album, compiled from the first two tapes (This Corpse is a Warning). This lineup was the first to regularly record in a professional studio. These recordings were collected in 1994 on the Single File CD, released by Mind Of A Child Records and later re-issued by Criminal IQ Records in 2004.

The band achieved its greatest notoriety to date as a duo, touring extensively and being featured by legendary BBC DJ John Peel, who played the song "Rot Rot Rot" from the Hammeroid! EP on his program several times.

It was also during this period that both Caporino and Dudley moved from the Boston area to Chicago.

=== Post-Dudley era ===
Dudley left the band in 1993 to pursue a Master's Degree in architecture. Though the band experienced a fall-off in popularity, Caporino continued to home-record cassettes, releasing seven cassettes between 1993 and 1998. The band also performed live with new members Dennis Spaag on bass and Garret Hammond (a future member of Kill Hannah) on drums. The Chicago lineup continued to evolve, featuring drummers Tim Ford and Ryan "Guitar" Murphy, bassist JJ Champion, and guitarist/bassist Laurence Museum of Death.

2003 saw the release of the band's first full album of all-new recordings, Kill M.O.T.O., which featured studio recordings of songs from Caporino's most recent home-recorded cassettes as well as brand new songs. In 2005, the band released Raw Power, which met with critical acclaim, including being selected as the best Chicago release of 2005 by the Chicago Reader's Bob Mehr.

=== Move to Providence, return to New Orleans, and touring ===
In September 2009, Caporino briefly moved to Providence, Rhode Island. He planned to continue the band with a new lineup in Providence, but subsequently decided to return to his native New Orleans, where he reunited with original members Jeff and Mike Tomeny. Caporino also began to perform acoustic solo sets consisting primarily of M.O.T.O. material. M.O.T.O. toured almost constantly, covering Europe, Japan, Australia as well as the U.S. The band released the studio albums No Way Street and Pack Your Troubles in Dreams and re-released older material via digital download and CD-R.

=== Move to New Hampshire and tour of China ===
M.O.T.O. relocated, this time to New Hampshire, as Caporino married bassist J.V. McDonough (formerly of The River City Rebels) and added her to the lineup. Joined by China-based expats Gil Brunnhoeffer and Chris Ginn, the band completed their first tour of China in 2013 with Shanghai based punk band Round Eye.

== Discography ==
In the early years of the band, Caporino expressed disdain for compact disc media. Although recent M.O.T.O releases are now available in CD format, most of the earlier band releases were on cassette and LP. Most of their newer recordings are released through Criminal IQ Records and Little Teddy Recordings.

=== (LPs & CDs) ===
- Chinese Rocks (or A Fistful of Maobacks) - (2014 vinyl LP release by Blast Of Silence Records/Secret Mission Records) - (released on CD (with bonus tracks) 2017 by MOTOPAC)
- Pack Your Troubles In Dreams - (2013 vinyl LP release by Svart Records/Blast Of Silence Records)
- No Sleep 'til Turku (2012 vinyl LP release by Svart Records/Blast Of Silence Records)
- No Way Street (2012 vinyl LP release by Svart Records/Blast Of Silence Records / CD release by Tokyo No Records)
- Raw Power (2005 release by Criminal IQ, also on CD)
- Single File CD (2004 re-issue by Criminal IQ in the USA)
- Kill MOTO! (2002 vinyl LP release by Little Teddy Recordings in Germany; 2012 vinyl LP re-release by Svart Records; 2003 CD release by Criminal IQ in USA)
- Single File CD (28-song collection of single tracks 1988-1994; 1997 release by Mind Of A Child in USA)
- E Pluribus MOTO LP (1996 release by Teenage Kicks in Germany - reissued 2012 by Rerun Records - USA)
- Bolt LP (1996 release by Little Teddy Recordings in Germany - reissued 2012 by Rerun Records - USA)
- This Corpse is a Warning CD/LP/CS (1990 Netherlands release by Resonance Records)

=== Singles & EPs ===
- Shitty Kids EP (Secret Mission Records / 2013)
- Golden Quarter Hour of M.O.T.O. EP (Rerun Records / 2013)
- No Way Street EP - 300 on black wax, 150 on clear purple, 50 on clear blue (Surfin'Ki Records Records / Italy / 2008)
- European Tour EP (P Trash Records / Germany / 20.3.2007)
- What's Words Worth? EP (Rehab Records / USA / 2006)
- El Stop b/w She's Gone Nuts (Baby Killer Records / USA / 2006)
- Spiral Souch EP (Shit Sandwich / USA / 2003)
- Eternal Standby (MOC / USA / 1998)
- 4PAC (MOC / USA / 1997)
- Jacuzzi For the Dead EP (Little Teddy Recordings / Germany / 1996)
- Wee Beasties EP (Little Teddy Recordings / Germany / 1995)
- Midnight at the Guantanamo Room b/w Skinny Head (Mind Of A Child / USA / 1994)
- Street Where Love Lives b/w Coming Down All Day and Night (Hi-Ball / USA / 1993)
- Places We Used to Go / Love Back / Skeletons Need Their Sleep (Rockville / USA / 1992)
- Magic Words b/w Ghosts (Jetpac / Canada / 1992)
- I Am the Cheese b/w I Can't Stop It (Feel Good All Over / USA / 1991)
- She's Not Ready b/w Badger & Germ Inside (Feel Good All Over / USA / 1990)
- I Shot My Load and I'm Ready for the Grave EP (Tulpa / USA / 1989)
- Hammeroid! EP (Tulpa / USA / 1988)

=== Cassettes ===
- Live In Turku (Blast Of Silence Records 2012)
- AMNFM (1999)
- TERRAMOTO (1998)
- Gangway for Miracles (1997)
- Wall of Phlegm (1997)
- Ampeg Stud (1996)
- Bandit 65 (1996)
- Fletcher Henderson (1995)
- E Pluribus M.O.T.O. (1993)
- Talk of M.O.T.O. (1991)
- M.O.T.O. Machine Music (a.k.a. RADIO BJ) (1990)
- 1000 Years of Rock'N'Roll (1989)
- Neon Bone! (1988)
- MOTOERECTUS (1987)
- QUASIMOTO (1987)
- Rock, Roll & Dismember (1986)
- BOLT! (1986)
- Turn Your Head and Cough (1985)
