= Beautiful Noise (TV series) =

Canadian television series

Beautiful Noise is an HD television music profile and performance series produced in Canada by Original Spin Media. The series premiered on Rave HD in the United States in the summer of 2006. The programs debuted in Canada on Sun TV in January 2008 and CBC Bold in March 2009. The series was filmed at Toronto's Berkeley Church performance and event venue.

== Season 1 ==
- Feist
- Cowboy Junkies
- Neko Case
- Jeff Healey
- Ron Sexsmith
- Sarah Harmer
- Kathleen Edwards
- North Mississippi Allstars
- The Stills
- Pilot Speed
- The Sisters Euclid (Kevin Breit)
- Sam Roberts Band

== Season 2 ==
- Ben Kweller
- Stars of Track and Field
- The Ponys
- Voxtrot
- Sloan
- The Long Winters
- Finger Eleven
- Apples in Stereo
- Grace Potter and the Nocturnals

== Season 3 ==
- My Morning Jacket
- Dr. Dog
- The Constantines
- Ted Leo & the Pharmacists
- The Black Angels
- The Donnas
- Islands
- Stars
- People in Planes
- British Sea Power
- Yo La Tengo
- Thriving Ivory
- Sarah Slean
- Joel Plaskett
- Jim White
- Kaki King
- Jon Langford
- Peter Elkas
