= Avatar (1979 video game) =

Role-playing video game for the PLATO system

Avatar is an early graphics-based multi-user highly interactive role-playing video game, created on the University of Illinois' PLATO system in the late 1970s. It has graphics for navigating through a dungeon and chat-style text for player status and communication with others. It can currently be played online via Cyber1 or a simulation called Javatar. What makes Avatar popular is the high level of interactivity with other players and the sense of community that develops. Development on Avatar began on the University of Illinois PLATO system around 1976 by Bruce Maggs and Andrew Shapira, who were junior high school students at the time. They were soon joined by David Sides, who was a student at the University of Illinois. The first version was released in 1979.

== History ==
Avatar was a successor to several innovative and highly successful role-playing games on the PLATO system, most notably Oubliette, written by Jim Schwaiger and published on the PLATO system in 1977. It was so difficult that one could not play it alone; in order for players to survive, they had to run in groups. Following Oubliette, also on PLATO, was a game called Moria written in 1977, copyright 1978.

Classic as well as modified versions of Avatar 84 are operating on Cyber1. When the NovaNET system existed, it hosted original versions of both Avatar 95 and Avatar 90. It was also possible to play versions of Avatar 84 and Man 60 Avatar on Novanet. These last two games operated with the old game data on the Avatar 95 engine, which was not quite the same as playing through the original engine. The NovaNET system was shut down in November 2015.

== Gameplay ==
Avatar is inherently a MMO multi-player game.

== See also ==
- Mordor: The Depths of Dejenol - a PC based clone of Avatar
