= Mordor: The Depths of Dejenol =

1995 video game

- Developer(s): David Allen
- Publisher(s): David Allen
- Platform(s): Microsoft Windows
- Release: 1995

Mordor: The Depths of Dejenol is a role-playing video game released in 1995 for Microsoft Windows. It was game designer David Allen's first release. Mordor inspired a sequel, Demise: Rise of the Ku'tan, released in 2000.

Despite its name, the game is not set in the "Mordor" realm of Middle-earth created by J. R. R. Tolkien. The game has an original backstory, largely confined to its documentation.

== Gameplay ==
The game consists of a 15-level dungeon containing hundreds of different monster types and items. Much like other role-playing games, players must develop their characters by fighting these monsters and gaining new equipment, gradually getting powerful enough to survive lower levels. Characters can play as several races like Dwarf, Elf, Gnome, and Giant while advancing in each of several guilds, including Warrior, Sorcerer, Healer, Thief, Seeker, Mage, Wizard and Paladin.

On the lowest level of the dungeon resides the "Prince of Devils". Defeating this monster can be considered "winning the game", although the game does not end and continues to be playable (and challenging) long after. The game also offers replay value through new character/guild combinations and community-devised challenges and competitions.

== Origins ==
Allen designed Mordor after a late-1970s multi-user dungeon game named Avatar, which ran on the PLATO system developed by the University of Illinois. Unlike Avatar, Mordor offers single-user play only, although players can run several characters in the dungeon concurrently and control up to four characters simultaneously in a single party.

== Reception ==
A reviewer for Next Generation praised the easy accessibility of character info, but condemned the game for its lack of story and puzzles, saying that the absence of these elements make it "just not fun". He scored it two out of five stars.
