= The Ponys =

American indie/garage rock band

- Origin: Chicago, Illinois, United States
- Genres: Indie rock, garage rock
- Years active: 2001–2007; 2009; 2016–2017
- Labels: In the Red; Matador
- Members: Jered Gummere; Melissa Elias; Brian Case
- Past members: Ian Adams; Nathan Jerde (deceased)
- Website: theponys.com

The Ponys were an American indie rock and garage rock band from Chicago, Illinois, United States, formed by singer and guitarist Jered Gummere, in early 2001. Gummere was concurrently in the punk band, Guilty Pleasures, at the time of The Ponys' formation. He eventually left to devote himself entirely to The Ponys. Gummere recruited members of the band, his first choice being girlfriend Melissa Elias whom he met while she was attending Illinois State University in his hometown. Together they experimented with indie and post-punk styles.

The two began to write songs, and were joined by ex-Mushuganas drummer, Nathan Jerde. The Ponys began touring the Chicago club circuit and would then record their first singles on Contaminated and Big Neck records. Concerned their sound was lacking, Gummere asked Ian Adams, a member of Happy Supply to join the band. After releasing a few more singles, the Ponys signed with In the Red Records (based in Los Angeles), due to widespread circulation. The band was set to record their first album, Laced with Romance, in Detroit with producer Jim Diamond.

== Laced with Romance ==
Their initial release, Laced With Romance, met with moderate critical success. The album reached media from local indie-zines such as Horizontal Action, to mainstream-America music publications including Rolling Stone and Spin.

The Ponys toured to support their album, with bands such as The Unicorns, The Fall, and The Fiery Furnaces.

== Celebration Castle ==
Despite some members wanting to leave due mostly to exhaustion, the Ponys continued and began to record their second album. Wanting to record locally they met with Chicago-based producer Steve Albini, who had previously worked with artists such as PJ Harvey, The Pixies, and Nirvana. The Ponys began recording in late 2004 and were finished in four days. The album held a much cleaner tone than the first but still retained the recognizable live sound that they were known for. Later that year, Ian Adams left the band, tired of touring and was replaced by Brian Case of 90 Day Men. Celebration Castle was released in early 2005 and the band continued touring.

== Turn the Lights Out ==
Since recording Celebration Castle, the Ponys have left In the Red Records and signed with the New York-based indie label Matador Records. They recorded their third album, titled Turn The Lights Out, in late 2006. The album was released on March 20, 2007. In 2010, the band released their first new recording since Turn the Lights Out, the EP Deathbed Plus 4.

Guitarist Brian Case played in the Chicago garage rock band Disappears and currently in a project called FACS.

Nathan Jerde died in May 2025.

== Discography ==
=== Studio albums ===
- Laced with Romance (In the Red, 2004)
- Celebration Castle (In the Red, 2005)
- Turn the Lights Out (Matador, 2007)

=== Other ===
- Wicked City (Big Neck, 2002)
- Pop Culture (Maybe Chicago?/Criminal IQ, 2004)
- Another Wound (Sweet Nothing, 2005)
- Deathbed Plus 4 (Matador, 2010)

== TV appearances ==
- Beautiful Noise
- Entourage, Season 4, Episode: Dream Team

== Band members ==
=== Current ===
- Jered Gummere – guitar, vocals
- Melissa Elias – bass, vocals
- Brian Case – guitar

=== Past ===
- Ian Adams – guitar
- Nathan Jerde – percussion (died 2025)
