= Stand-in (disambiguation) =

A stand-in is a substitute actor for another actor in television or film.

Stand In may also refer to:

== Film and television ==
- Stand-In, a 1937 American comedy film
- The Stand-In (1999 film), an American drama film
- The Stand In (2020 film), an American comedy film
- The Perfect Date (working title The Stand-In), a 2019 American teen romantic comedy film
- The Stand-In (TV series), a 2014 Chinese television series
- "The Stand In" (Seinfeld), a 1994 episode of Seinfeld

== Music ==
- The Stand-In (album), by Caitlin Rose, 2013
- The Stand Ins, an album by Okkervil River, 2008
- "Stand In", a song by Don Robertson

== See also ==
- Stand (disambiguation)
