= Bruce Maggs =

American computer scientist

Bruce MacDowell Maggs is an American computer scientist and professor at Duke University whose research interests include computer networks, distributed systems, and computer security. He was a founding employee and served as vice president for Research and Development for Akamai Technologies. He is currently the Director of Engineering at Emerald Innovations, Inc.

== Biography ==
Maggs earned his B.S. (1985), M.S (1986), and Ph.D. (1989) from the Massachusetts Institute of Technology. After graduating, he worked for NEC Research Institute as a research scientist.

In 1994, he joined the Computer Science department at Carnegie Mellon University, rising to the rank of full professor with tenure.

In 1998, Maggs took three semesters off of teaching to become a founding employee of the then-startup Akamai Technologies (Nasdaq: AKAM). While at Akamai, he became Vice President of Research and Development. He currently serves as Vice President of Research for the company.

From 1998 to 1999, Maggs was on the faculty of Massachusetts Institute of Technology as a Visiting Associate Professor.

In 2007, Maggs joined the faculty of Duke University, where he is currently the Pelham Wilder Professor of Computer Science. He holds a dual appointment to the Electrical Engineering department of Duke's Pratt School of Engineering.

He is currently on leave from Duke University to serve as the Director of Engineering at Emerald Innovations, Inc.

== Personal life ==
Bruce Maggs is the brother of Federal Judge Gregory E. Maggs. Maggs is also married to Jennifer Chang, an instructor in the Department of Music at Duke University the director of Duke University's Chinese Music Ensemble.

== Other achievements ==
Apart from leading the early engineering efforts for Akamai, Maggs was a co-creator of Avatar, a popular early multiplayer online game developed at the University of Illinois in the late 1970s.

== Recognition ==
Maggs was elected as an ACM Fellow in 2018 for "contributions to the development of content distribution networks and the theory of computer networks".
