= Laced with Romance =

Studio album by the Ponys
- Released: February 17, 2004 (US); March 22, 2004 (UK)
- Recorded: 2003
- Genres: Indie rock; garage rock
- Length: 43:38
- Label: In the Red
- Producer: Jim Diamond

The Ponys chronology
Laced with Romance (2004)	Celebration Castle (2005)

Professional ratings
Review scores
Source	Rating
AllMusic	4/5 stars
The Austin Chronicle	3/4 stars
Entertainment Weekly	A−
Pitchfork	8.0/10
The Village Voice	A−

Laced with Romance is the debut album by American indie/garage rock band the Ponys.

== Track listing ==
All songs written by Jered Gummere, Melissa Elias, Nathan Jerde, and Ian Adams.

1. "Lets Kill Ourselves" - 3:33
2. "10 Fingers 11 Toes" - 3:34
3. "Sad Eyes" - 4:00
4. "Little Friends" - 3:28
5. "Fall Inn" - 3:35
6. "Looking Out a Mirror" - 3:44
7. "Trouble Trouble" - 3:33
8. "Chemical Imbalance" - 3:06
9. "I'll Make You a Star" - 5:43
10. "I Love You 'Cause (You Look Like Me)" - 2:35
11. "Virus Human" - 2:28
12. "The Only One" - 6:19
