= Celebration Castle =

Studio album by the Ponys
- Released: May 3, 2005
- Recorded: 2004
- Genres: Indie rock, garage rock
- Length: 35:15
- Label: In the Red Records
- Producer: Steve Albini

The Ponys chronology
Laced with Romance (2004)	Celebration Castle (2005)	Turn the Lights Out (2007)

Professional ratings
Aggregate scores
Source	Rating
Metacritic	77/100
Review scores
Source	Rating
AllMusic	4.5/5 stars
Neumu	8/10
Pitchfork	7.8/10
PopMatters	7/10
Rolling Stone	3.5/5 stars
Spin	A−
Stylus Magazine	B
The Village Voice	A−

Celebration Castle is the second album by American indie/garage rock band the Ponys. The band recorded it in four days in late 2004. It was released on May 3, 2005.

== Track listing ==
All songs written by Jered Gummere, Melissa Elias, Nathan Jerde, and Ian Adams.

1. "Glass Conversation" – 4:19
2. "Another Wound" – 3:33
3. "Today" – 3:10
4. "I'm with You" – 2:33
5. "We Shot the World" – 4:02
6. "Shadow Box" – 3:42
7. "Discoteca" – 2:54
8. "Get Black" – 4:22
9. "She's Broken" – 4:41
10. "Ferocious" – 3:59

== Personnel ==
- Steve Albini – Engineer
- Steve Hall – Mastering
