= Cheap Freaks =

Irish garage rock band

- Origin: Dublin

Cheap Freaks are a garage rock band based in Dublin, Ireland.

== History ==
Bass guitar/vocalist Robbie Brady, a former member of Irish garage rock band The Things formed the band in 2009 with fellow Dublin born guitarist/vocalist Alan Dodd, who also shares songwriting and vocal duties with Brady. They have released a handful of EPs and one full-length LP on US indie label Big Neck Records in 2012. Over the years they have had numerous line up changes with the latest that includes band members Sean Goucher and Dave Mulvaney. The band have toured throughout Europe and their homeland and have opened for acts such as Beady Eye, The Buzzcocks, Wire, Jay Reatard and many others. The band are currently working on their 2nd LP.

== Discography ==
Year	Album	Label
2010	Play Four Songs EP	Big Neck Records
2011	Teenage Brains EP	Psycho Sound Records
2011	Cruel World/Asahara's Nightmare (single)	Psycho Sound Records
2012	Bury Them All LP	Big Neck Records
2012	Bad Bad Men Split EP with The Mighty Stef	Psycho Sound Records/TFBIDR
2012	Live at the Olympia (Cassette)	Mistreated Records

== See also ==
- List of Irish musical groups
- List of garage rock bands
