= CKXT-DT =

Former TV station in Toronto, Canada

- Final logo used prior to Sun News simulcast
- Toronto, Ontario; Canada
- Channels: Analog: 52; Digital: 66
- Branding: Toronto One (pre-launch); Toronto 1 (2003–2005); Sun TV (2005–April 2011); Sun News Network (April–October 2011)

Programming
- Affiliations: Independent (2003–2011); Sun News Network (2011)

Ownership
- Owner: Craig Media (2003–2004); CHUM Limited (2004); Quebecor Media (2004–2011); (Groupe TVA (2004–2011))

History
- First air date: September 19, 2003
- Last air date: November 1, 2011; (8 years, 43 days)
- Former call signs: CKXT-TV (2003–2011)
- Call sign meaning: CKX (call sign of the first television station owned by CKXT's original owners, Craig Media) Toronto

Technical information
- ERP: 3 kW
- HAAT: 458 m (1,503 ft)
- Transmitter coordinates: 43°38′33″N 79°23′14″W

CKXT-DT (channel 52) was a television station in Toronto, Ontario, Canada, which broadcast to much of southern and eastern Ontario. It was owned by Quebecor Media through its Groupe TVA unit. Although beginning as a general interest independent station carrying a typical schedule of entertainment and information programming, by the time of the station's closure on November 1, 2011, the station had been converted into an over-the-air simulcast of Quebecor's cable news channel, Sun News Network. The station transmitted on channel 52 in Toronto.

CKXT began broadcasting on September 19, 2003, owned and operated by Craig Media as a general-interest independent station branded Toronto 1. Following the station's sale to Quebecor, it was renamed Sun TV on August 29, 2005. It then began to simulcast Sun News upon that channel's launch on April 18, 2011.

Although Sun News was licensed as a Category C (optional carriage) digital specialty channel, CKXT, as a broadcast station, had mandatory cable carriage in its over-the-air service area. Hence the simulcast meant that Sun News programming was available to analog cable subscribers throughout southern and eastern Ontario. However, the station retained its own broadcast licence separate from the specialty channel. The station's Ottawa transmitter was closed on August 31, 2011, while the remaining transmitters in Toronto, Hamilton, and London were closed on November 1, 2011.

== History ==
=== Toronto 1: licensing and launch ===
Prelaunch logo of Toronto One.

Craig Media was awarded a licence for Toronto 1 (originally stylized as "Toronto One") by the Canadian Radio-television and Telecommunications Commission (CRTC) on April 8, 2002, in a controversial split decision regarding five competing applications for new Toronto-area TV stations. Torstar, which proposed a "Hometown Television" format with a main station in Toronto and repeaters in Hamilton and Kitchener, was widely deemed the frontrunner for the licence. However, its proposed schedule, with minimum 85% Canadian content consisting primarily of local and regional programming and no U.S. simulcasts, was found to be unviable by most commissioners. Several existing broadcasters were opposed to any new stations being licensed in the Toronto area because of the unstable economic climate. Alliance Atlantis and Canwest were also unsuccessful applicants. At the same time Rogers applied for and received a licence for a second Toronto multicultural station, OMNI.2, in a much less controversial decision.

The CKXT license also marked the first time that Craig Media had been granted a licence to compete directly with a station owned by CHUM Limited, which meant that CHUM lost sales revenues from the broadcast rights it had contracted to Craig's A-Channel stations. CHUM retaliated by applying for broadcast licences in Calgary and Edmonton, two markets it had previously avoided so as not to compete directly with Craig. The CRTC denied CHUM's applications.

On-air logo for "Toronto 1" (2003–2005); similar in style to the logo for A-Channel, the TV system owned by A-Channel & Toronto One's parent, Craig Media.

CKXT went to air on September 19, 2003, as the first new general-interest television station in Toronto in 30 years. Toronto 1 proved, however, to be a financial and critical disaster for Craig. The station was frequently criticized in the Toronto media, particularly for flashy but vacuous and repetitive local content, newscasts that had a tabloid feel, an uninspired daytime schedule laden with American talk shows and an equally uninspired prime time schedule based heavily on movies, much like CHUM's longstanding Citytv. Columnist Russell Smith of The Globe and Mail called Toronto 1 an "abject, wretched excuse for a television station" whose only truly locally-focused programming was a trio of celebrity-focused talk shows and a health-issues show.

On May 19, 2004, Craig announced that 28 Toronto 1 employees and nine employees working at CKAL in Calgary were being laid off. In addition, a large portion of Toronto 1's original programming, including weekday morning show Toronto Today, variety show The Toronto Show, and late evening talk show Last Call, were cancelled. Some of the hosts, such as Wei Chen and Roz Weston, were reassigned to other roles with the station at that point. Craig Media said the cuts were made to "further rationalize its operations and control costs".

None of the changes worked, however, and on April 12, 2004—seven months after CKXT launched—Craig sold its conventional television assets to CHUM Limited for $265 million. CHUM was required by CRTC competition regulations to put CKXT back on the market immediately, owing to its already strong presence in the Toronto television market through CITY-TV.

=== Sale to Quebecor Media and relaunch as SUN TV ===
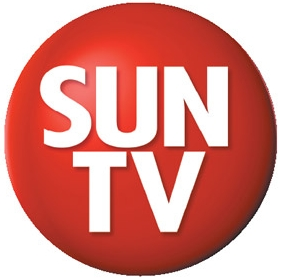
First logo as SUN TV, used from 2005 to 2007.

CHUM sold CKXT to Quebecor Media (QMI), the media unit of Montreal-based communications conglomerate Quebecor. The deal was completed on December 2, 2004; Quebecor gave CHUM CA$46 million and Sun Media's 29.9 percent share in CP24 for CKXT. Ownership in CKXT was split, 75 percent to 25 percent, between QMI's publicly traded broadcasting unit Groupe TVA and wholly owned publishing subsidiary Sun Media, which owned The Toronto Sun. The station would be re-branded as "Sun TV" on August 29, 2005.

After CKXT's sale to Quebecor, the new management cancelled the station's evening news program, Toronto Tonight, and announced it would expand its entertainment magazine program The A-List to one hour in length, airing weeknights from 7 to 8 p.m. (which was later reduced to a weekend only timeslot, effective March 24, 2006). A late-night sports talk show, The Grill Room, premiered on September 1.

Before Toronto Tonight ended on June 30, 2005, former Toronto Tonight co-anchor Ben Chin announced he would be moving to Global Television Network as a senior news correspondent; later that summer he decided instead to enter political life as an advisor in Ontario Premier Dalton McGuinty's communications team.

Chin's Toronto Tonight co-anchor Sarika Sehgal was also let go at the same time. In late 2005, Sehgal joined the 24-hour news channel CBC Newsworld as a host. In the winter of 2003, Toronto Tonight correspondent Chris Mavridis left to join CBS News as a New York–based network correspondent. In addition to anchoring and reporting, Mavridis helped create new programming for the network's broadcast radio and online divisions.

Roz Weston joined ET Canada. Natasha Ramsahai, the morning weather person on Toronto Today, is now a meteorologist for Citytv Toronto, while Bill Coulter, the evening weather person on Toronto Tonight, is now a meteorologist for CP24. Tracy Moore and Dina Pugliese both joined Citytv Toronto. Wei Chen is now a host on CBC Radio One.

SUN TV logo from 2007 to 2009.

As Sun TV, the station met its Canadian content obligations primarily by airing repeats of older Canadian series such as King of Kensington, The Beachcombers, Danger Bay, Ready or Not, My Secret Identity, Super Dave and Side Effects, while also picking up some original non-fiction programming, including the movie review series DVD Show, the concert series Beautiful Noise and the food program Street Eats.

The performance of CKXT under Quebecor was no better than it was under Craig. In March 2006, the Canadian Media Guild announced that 13 employees would be laid off from the station, including its entire marketing department, and Inside Jam (the rebranded A-List) would be relegated to weekends only. A new program, Canoe Live, was launched in May 2006 to poor reviews.

At the same time, the station stepped up its acquisitions of U.S. network series, albeit mainly the "leftovers" not obtained by other Canadian networks. The fall 2006 schedule, for instance, included Veronica Mars, 60 Minutes, Cops, America's Most Wanted and Girlfriends. The first four programs aired on other Canadian television networks but with poor ratings.

CKXT also carried both of the original MyNetworkTV telenovelas, Desire and Fashion House in 2006, although it scheduled them in the afternoons rather than in prime time. Due to low ratings, the station elected not to air future MNTV telenovelas after the first two series concluded on December 5, 2006. With the conversion of the CH television system to E! Canada, CKXT also picked up some of CHCH-TV's former daytime programming, including the long-running American game show The Price Is Right, which has moved to OMNI.2, but it has since began airing on CITY-DT.

CKXT-TV was the only English-language independent television station outside of religious and community television stations in Canada on the UHF band.

The station applied for rebroadcasters in Ottawa and London in 2007, in order to improve its reach across southern Ontario. The move would give the station coverage roughly equal to that of Citytv, OMNI.1 or OMNI.2. On September 14, 2007, the CRTC approved CKXT's request, giving the station channel 26, digital 19 in London; and channel 54, digital 62 in Ottawa. Sun TV later applied to change its digital channel in Ottawa to 20; this was given approval on June 17, 2008 and began transmissions in September 2008. As of late December 2008, CKXT was broadcasting in London in high definition on channel 19.1 and standard definition on channel 19.2.

On December 1, 2009, the CRTC approved an application by Quebecor Media to allow a corporate reorganization through which Groupe TVA would acquire Sun Media's 25 percent stake in CKXT.

=== Transition to Sun News ===
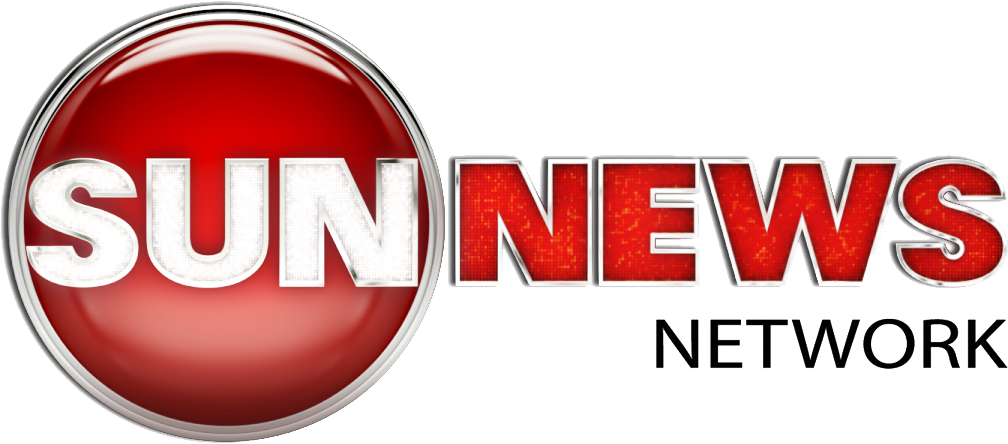
Sun News Network logo, which also served as CKXT's de facto logo from April to October 2011

On June 14, 2010, Channel Zero and CHEK Media Group (then-owners of CHCH-TV/CJNT-TV and CHEK-TV, which they acquired respectively after the E! system folded) announced they had acquired the rights to virtually all of the first-run U.S. series that had aired on CKXT during the 2009–10 season, including Smallville, Supernatural, 60 Minutes, and Jimmy Kimmel Live!. The programming announcement came amidst speculation that CKXT parent Quebecor Media was planning to launch a new news channel, with some of the rumours suggesting that CKXT might be part of the new venture. On June 15, 2010, Quebecor confirmed its plans for the new Sun News Network with a scheduled launch date of January 1, 2011. As part of its plans for Sun News, Groupe TVA submitted an application to the CRTC to replace CKXT's licence with a new three-year Category 1 specialty channel licence for the news channel. The Category 1 application was declined by the CRTC in July 2010, but a Category 2 application was approved in November 2010. This left CKXT's fate in 2011 unclear (Quebecor management had initially stated that it did not plan to convert CKXT to an over-the-air all-news format).

For the bulk of the 2010–11 season, CKXT broadcast no local programming, and mainly broadcast movies (three movies each weekday, Monday through Friday, at 8 a.m., 1 and 8 p.m.; and a quadruple-feature of movies on Saturdays and Sundays at 3, 5, 7 and 9 p.m.), along with paid programming and a handful of "off-network" series reruns.

A CRTC filing in early 2011, seeking the authority to continue CKXT's operations following the digital conversion in August 2011, led to speculation that Quebecor was revisiting its earlier decision to surrender its over-the-air licence. Then, in late March 2011, the station's website began to redirect to the Sun News Network URL (the station itself continued to air regular programming). Sun News later confirmed via Twitter that it would simulcast its programming on CKXT, at least initially. The simulcast began at the same time Sun News was launched, at 4:30 p.m. ET on April 18, 2011.

Bell Satellite TV dropped CKXT the morning of May 3, due to a dispute with Quebecor on whether or not carriage fees should be levied, as Sun News was broadcast via CKXT, leading to Bell treating Sun News as a terrestrial channel (i.e., available without carriage fees). Quebecor argued that it should charge Bell TV for the rights, as it was a licensed cable specialty channel. (The outage did not affect Bell Fibe TV in the Toronto area, which was compelled to carry CKXT.)

=== Closedown ===
The CRTC had questioned Quebecor in early July on its usage of the station to simulcast Sun News, noting "Quebecor should expect to be asked to demonstrate why this is the best use of the radio spectrum". Quebecor management told the CRTC that it would shut the station down, rather than apply to renew the over-the-air licence. Quebecor closed CKXT on November 1, 2011. It was the fifth major TV station in Canada (and the first in one of Canada's three large cities) to have gone dark since 1977, when CFVO-TV in Hull, Quebec (now Gatineau), left the air (this station would be returned as a Radio-Québec station CIVO-TV, with a new CRTC license). Other than the 2009 closedowns of CHCA-TV in Red Deer, Alberta, and CKX-TV in Brandon, Manitoba (both of which went dark entirely), all other defunct stations in Canada became repeaters of other stations almost seamlessly. In addition, CIAN-TV in Calgary and CJAL-TV in Edmonton were closed down as they became the cable-only CTV 2 Alberta on August 31, that same year.

Following these changes, Sun News Network no longer received mandatory carriage and lost its previous low channel position in Toronto, Hamilton, London and Ottawa; the channel's programming was only available on cable and satellite providers carrying the specialty channel. In the Toronto area, shortly after the station left the air, Rogers-owned CityNews Channel took the place of CKXT on its former cable channel 15 slot for digital subscribers, while Buffalo PBS station WNED-TV occupied channel 15 for analog subscribers. Sun News retained the other channel positions previously allocated for CKXT on Rogers' cable systems (142 and 567), but it was no longer included as part of its basic service.

Sun News Network itself shut down on February 13, 2015, with Quebecor attributing the channel's failure to it being denied mandatory carriage.

== Transmitters ==
| Station | City of licence | Channel; (RF / VC) | ERP | HAAT | Transmitter coordinates | Notes |
|---|---|---|---|---|---|---|
| CKXT-DT-1 | Hamilton | 15 (UHF); 45 | 8.6 kW | 193.1 m (634 ft) | 43°12′27″N 79°46′27″W | Defunct as of October 31, 2011 |
| CKXT-DT-2 | London | 19 (UHF); 19 | 7.0 kW | 313.6 m (1,029 ft) | 42°57′20″N 81°21′19″W | Defunct as of October 31, 2011 |
| CKXT-DT-3 | Ottawa | 20 (UHF) | 9.3 kW | 332.9 m (1,092 ft) | 45°30′11″N 75°51′01″W | Defunct as of August 31, 2011 |

Following the shutdown of these rebroadcasters, most channel allocations were transferred to other stations:

- CKXT-DT-1's allocation is occupied by CHCH-DT since December 2, 2013, with virtual channel 11.1.
- CKXT-DT-2's allocation is vacant as of May 2020.
- CKXT-DT-3's allocation is occupied by CJMT-DT-2 (OMNI 2) since August 31, 2011, with virtual channel 14.1.

== Digital television and high definition ==
Subchannels were for the London and Ottawa digital repeaters only.

| Channel | Programming |
|---|---|
| x.1 | CKXT-DT HD feed |
| x.2 | CKXT-DT SD feed |

The same program content was duplicated on both subchannels.

After the analog television shutdown and digital conversion, which took place on August 31, 2011, CKXT-DT remained on channel 66 until its closedown at the end of October. Digital television receivers would display CKXT-DT's virtual channel as 52.1.

CKXT-DT-1 in Hamilton and CKXT-DT-2 London stayed on 15 and 19 respectively, following the transition until their closedowns.
