= Istaria: Chronicles of the Gifted =

2003 video game

- Developer: Virtrium LLC
- Publisher: Virtrium LLC
- Designers: Jason Murdick, Franck Arnoux
- Engine: Intrinsic Alchemy; Mantrid Engine
- Platform: Windows
- Release: EU: December 5, 2003; NA: December 9, 2003; AU: December 12, 2003
- Genre: Massively multiplayer online role-playing
- Mode: Multiplayer

Istaria: Chronicles of the Gifted is a massively multiplayer online role-playing game (MMORPG) developed by American studio Virtrium and originally released by developer Artifact Entertainment and publisher Atari as Horizons: Empire of Istaria. Tulga Games, LLC acquired the game and all related assets on January 25, 2005 and sold them to EI Interactive in July 2006. On July 18, 2007, Virtrium LLC (Vi) acquired the rights to the game.

Set in a sword and sorcery world, the game allows players to be adventurers, crafters, or both, and features a struggle between the "living races" (including the players), and "the Withered Aegis", an army of the undead seeking to destroy all life.

Istaria is unique among MMORPGs in that players may choose a dragon for their avatar. Istaria allows players to build non-instanced player communities with either multi-level underground dragon chambers or ground level communities.

== Gameplay ==
Istaria uses the race/class/level paradigm common to many role-playing games, as well as similar mechanics as other massively multiplayer online games. The goal is to join the forces of the "Gifted" together with other players against the evil hordes of undead, the "Withered Aegis", to build communities, repair broken structures, and solve quests. Unlike other MMORPGs, players do not normally fight each other in player versus player (PvP) battles, but they work together in player versus environment (PvE) battles. To fight in PvP battles, one would have to travel to a designated PvP area, like the Isle of Battles.

=== Races ===
There are eleven playable races in Istaria. These include Dragons, in addition to the more biped classes of Human, Elf, Dwarf, Gnome, Half-giant Dryad, Satyr, Fiend, Saris (a catlike anthropomorphic humanoid), and Sslik (an asexual non-anthropomorphic reptilian humanoid).

==== Biped Classes ====
There are 28 adventures and 19 trade schools a biped can choose from. The biped classes have the special ability to be able to learn any amount of trade schools. Only one trade and adventure school can be active at a time. Each adventure school adds master-able abilities to the character, which can be used in all other adventure schools, adding additional powers to the character. These abilities can be changed between the schools, as they often have their own disadvantages as well. The adventure schools split up into the healer, mage and warrior paths, as well as hybrid paths.

==== Dragons ====
Dragons have one adventure school and three trade schools. In this sense, they are different from bipeds. A dragon starts as a flightless hatchling, but over the course of a lengthy mid-level questline called the "Rite of Passage" can become an adult dragon who is able to fly. In a related series of quests at max Adventure level called the "Ancient Rite of Passage", dragons become the much larger Ancient Dragons, which adds more abilities and an increase to some attributes. During the quest to adulthood, dragons need to decide between two different factions, called the Helian and the Lunus. Helians prefer to use magic in combat, and are more friendly to bipeds. The Lunus prefer to use melee attacks during fights and are less friendly to bipeds. Only dragons are able to fly in Istaria.

=== Trading and Crafting ===
The tradeskill system is of a very high grade of complexity. The three dragon trade schools are used to build lairs, scales, spells and crystals. The biped trade school splits up in schools to produce usable items, like clothes, armor, weapons, jewelry, scrolls, potions, food, tools, and spells. The biped trade schools build structures like houses, guild houses, walls, workshops, silos, and consignors. There are about 150 different resources that can be gathered from ore, wood, plants and animals. At higher levels, higher tiered resources are able to be gathered. For example, Copper and Tin are available at tier I, Iron is available at tier II, Steel is available at tier III, Cobalt at tier IV, Mithril at tier V and Adamantium at tier VI. The resources are refined using tools and machines, and are then crafted into final products. During assembly of the final products, players can change the color and improve various qualities and attributes. These production techniques and formulas need to be collected and bought over time. The craft-able equipment is very important to the player, and is unlike other MMORPGs, where trade skills often play a much smaller role. There are over 2000 formulas and techniques that can be collected and stored.

== Development ==
The core concepts behind Istaria before release were to create a zone-less, constantly changing environment in which players would work together to hold back a seemingly unstoppable enemy: the Withered Aegis. This enemy would consist of a few individuals from the Living Races (races that the players belong to), in an unholy alliance with groups of Devils and Demons from another race called the Realm of Blight. The Blight magic would include necromancy, the ability to create zombies from corpses. Due to the co-op nature of the game the Aegis would be entirely AI controlled. According to David Bowman in 2002, "Horizons will not ship with player versus player conflict. Rather, Artifact has chosen to put its full attention to making the player versus environment gameplay the best it can be."

This enemy was originally supposed to be dynamic in nature, launching automatic attacks on player held positions and blighting (capturing) the ground with its evil magic. This proved to be difficult to implement properly in practice, and the battlefront was eventually scaled back into static regions of player and Blight held areas. However, in the years after Horizons launched World Events that would be held. This would allow players to make a permanent mark on the world. While not as cost-effective to maintain as an automated system, this allowed Artifact and Tulga to keep their promise of a changing, interactive world.

After several years, there was no longer any land or lairs to purchase anymore. Only through Plot Reclamations, released by Virtrium in 2008, did owning areas become available to players without a paid account. The Plot Reclamations have since been carried out monthly. With the various updates, new content has been added since 2007. Updates to the client in recent years, along with more powerful computers have significantly reduced lag and improved the stability and smoothness of the game.

== Plot Events ==
When first launched, the Horizons staff established an event-driven storyline. These events revealed the lore and history of Istaria, and occasionally led to the discovery of new, different events.

Originally the game was slated to have weekly events, but since September 2004, they have been drastically reduced in number due to staffing and financial issues at Artifact and, later, Tulga. Some of the events included digging tunnels and building bridges to access new areas, and the freeing of an entire race from magically maintained slavery. Both the Satyr and Dryad races became player accessible through such large-scale, server-wide events.

Prior to the launch of Horizons and the problems that followed, these events and others like them were intended to be ongoing in a continuous fashion. Virtrium added seasonal events held throughout the year: Spring Festival, Summer Festival: Pax Istaria, Fall Festival and Winter Festival: Gnomekindle.

== Reception ==
Istaria suffered from several problems in the first years after launch. Many of these are acknowledged by both the current and former management of the various companies that have owned Istaria. Rick Simmons, the owner of Istaria, has stated that his team is working to rectify these issues as quickly as possible. Istaria suffers from a number of performance issues affecting both the client and the servers. These performance problems are often, and sometimes incorrectly categorized by players as lag. According to David Bowman, former Creative Director of Artifact and President of Tulga Games, "The client combat systems were slow and jerky... while there were many reasons to like the game, most players couldn't get to them past these problems." After several years of stagnation, Istaria no longer had land available for new players to purchase. However, a recent "Plot Reclamation" project has made available many areas which had previously been owned by players who are no longer subscribed. David Bowman: "There was not sufficient enjoyable content for the players, with some promised content systems not making it into the launch."

During the 7th Annual Interactive Achievement Awards, the Academy of Interactive Arts & Sciences nominated Chronicles of the Gifted, then called Horizons: Empire of Istaria, for "Massively Mutliplayer/Persistent World Game of the Year".

== Subscription ==
Istaria has Free Access and Paid Access / Paid Subscriptions. Free Access is a Free-to-play account. Paid Access is a single payment, while Paid Subscription renews automatically each month. Free Access provides a single character slot for any race and is limited to level 15 per adventure and crafting school. With the Property Holder Access / Subscription account, it is possible to have a plot or lair and up to 7 characters. A special feature in the account management allows Basic or Property Holder Access subscriptions to create more characters, to acquire several plots of land or lairs and to log in with multiple characters at the same time in the game from one account.

== Servers (Shards) ==
With the start of Horizons there were three European and eight North American servers, or shards. Because of the many problems at the beginning of Horizons, many players sought other alternatives and as well, some servers saw little use by very few players. In October 2004, the three European Shards (Wind, Ice and Earth) were merged into Unity, the five standard shards (Life, Shadow, Bounty, Twilight and Energy) to Chaos and the three RPG servers (Spirit, Dawn and Expanse) were merged into Order. With the takeover by Virtrium, the Unity shard was shut down at the end of 2007. In April 2008, players on the Unity server got the opportunity to move their characters to Order or Chaos free of charge.
