= Oubliette (video game) =

1977 video game

Oubliette is a 1977 multiplayer roleplaying game created for the PLATO system. It was designed by Jim Schwaiger, together with John Gaby and Bancherd DeLong. It was influential in the design of Avatar (1979) and Wizardry (1981).

== Gameplay ==
Graphically, Oubliette took place in a first-person perspective. Similar to Wizardry (1981), it had a castle and shop section where players buy items and goods, and a dungeon beneath where players adventure and encounter monsters. Players could also socialise in an in-game tavern and gamble money. However, the level of inter-player interaction has been described as limited compared to later games.

Players were able to choose from 15 ethnic groups and 15 classes based on ability scores. The game was designed around cooperation and was considerably more difficult when played solo. If all players exit the game, the environment is not retained.

== Development ==
The game was designed by Jim Schwaiger, together with John Gaby and Bancherd DeLong, initially as a means to automatically perform dice rolls in Dungeons & Dragons. It operated on the PLATO computer system. It was developed using University of Illinois Urbana-Champaign resources, with players paying a then-controversial $3 fee to retain their information on the system after periodic resets. The title is derived from oubliette, denoting a dungeon only accessible through a trap door.

== Influence and legacy ==
Oubliette was inspired by Moria (1975) and is considered to have influenced Avatar (1979) and the popular video game series Wizardry. Avatar, also designed for the PLATO system, was explicitly intended to "outdo" its antecedent, and the design of Wizardry has been described as plagiarized or "stolen" from Oubliette. Schwaiger would later state that he "could not find any meaningful difference" between Wizardry and Oubliette, though he conceded that he only played the former for a short period of time.

The game would later be released again for the Commodore 64 in 1983, and iOS and Android in 2012.
