= Goldfish Syndrome =

Irish musical group

Goldfish Syndrome are an Irish indie rock group from Cork. They released their first EP, Timewarp, in 2009, and started a regular collaboration with German producer Larry Fricke. The follow-up EP, Moving On was released in 2010 and had positive reviews and airplay in Ireland. The group then released a single, "Alleyways" in early 2013.

Their first album, A Drug Called Tradition, was released in May 2014, accompanied by a single, "Misty Morning". The single reached number 57 in the Irish charts and number 32 on the iTunes chart, including number one on the specialist rock chart. The release was accompanied by a tour of Ireland.

== Discography ==
- Timewarp (EP) (2009)
- Moving On (EP) (2010)
- A Drug Called Tradition (2014)
