= Big Neck Records =

American independent record label

- Founded: 1995
- Founder: Bart Hart
- Genre: Garage rock, garage punk, punk rock, rockabilly
- Country of origin: United States
- Location: Washington D.C.
- Official website: bigneckrecords.com

Big Neck Records is an independent record label founded and operated by Bart Hart. It was started in Buffalo, New York in 1995 with the release of the first Blowtops and Baseball Furies 7-inch EPs (Voodoo Alley and This Is the World's Greatest Rock & Roll Record, respectively) as an offshoot of The Sanctuary nightclub. Hart opened The Sanctuary in 1995 after abandoning his previous nightclub, Asbury Alley, and it hosted many related bands and performers. Big Neck moved to Washington D.C. The label produces garage, punk, and rockabilly acts.

== Roster ==
- Bart and the Brats
- The Baseball Furies
- The Blowtops
- Concubine Forming
- Fire Heads
- Hollywood
- The Hussy
- Lost Sounds
- The Ponys
- Radio Beats
- Red Red Red
- Stop Worrying and Love the Bomb
- Tractor Sex Fatality
- The Trailerpark Tornados
- The Tyrades
- Sonny Vincent
- Violent Lovers Club
- Wood Chickens
- NightFreak
- Science Man

== See also ==
- List of record labels
