= Blast 106 =

Belfast; Northern Ireland
- Frequency: 106.4 MHz

Programming
- Format: Music Top 40 Rhythm and Dance

Ownership
- Owner: Blast106 Ltd

History
- First air date: 2009

Links
- Website: & OSIKA.co.uk www.blast106.com

Blast 106 is an FM radio station broadcasting to Greater Belfast on 106.4 FM with a core target audience of 18-35 year olds.

The station commenced broadcasting in 2009, and the results of a recent listenership survey shows that the station has a weekly audience of approximately 94,500 people on FM with a large online listenership.

== Mission statement ==
“Blast106 is a radio station for students & young people living, working or studying in Greater Belfast. The station will Educate, Inform, Entertain and Represent the entire student and youth community with programmes that reflect their tastes and interests.”

== Schedule Monday - Friday ==
Time/Day	Monday	Tuesday	Wednesday	Thursday	Friday
7 am - 10 am	Fully Charged with Neil & Kathryn	Fully Charged with Neil	Fully Charged with Neil	Fully Charged with Neil	Fully Charged with Neil & Kathryn
10 am - 1 pm	Blast @ Work with Tyree	Blast @ Work with Tyree	Blast @ Work with Tyree	Blast @ Work with Tyree	Blast @ Work with Tyree
1 pm - 4 pm	Blast Hits with Will	Blast Hits with Will	Blast Hits with Will	Blast Hits with Will	Blast Hits with Will
4 pm - 7 pm	The Jam with Jacky Dee	The Jam with Jacky Dee	The Jam with Jacky Dee	The Jam with Jacky Dee	The Jam with Jacky Dee
7 pm - 9 pm	Blast Unlocked	Blast Unlocked	Blast Unlocked	Blast Unlocked	The Room with DJ Precious
9 pm - 12 am	The Lock In with Big Chris	The Lock In with Big Chris	The Lock In with Big Chris	The Lock In with Big Chris	Friday Night Blast with Rachel

== Schedule - Saturday ==
Time/Day	Saturday
7 am - 10 am	Weekend Breakfast with Anna
10 am - 1 pm	Focus
1 pm - 4 pm	Saturdays on Blast with Kristyn
4 pm - 7 pm	Saturdays on Blast with Chris Pollock
7 pm - 10 pm	The Session with Keith Cassidy
10 pm - 1 am	Saturday Night Blast

== Schedule - Sunday ==
Time/Day	Sunday
7 am - 10 am	Weekend Breakfast with Anna
10 am - 1 pm	Airplay 40 with Spencer James
1 pm - 4pm	Sundays on Blast with Emma
4 pm - 7 pm	Blast Reloaded with Jenny
7 pm - 9 pm	The Grind with DJ Precious
9 pm - 12 am	The Lock In Local with Big Chris

== Blast 106 Presenters ==
- Chris Barber
- Neil Curran
- Anna Mooney
- Tyree Patton
- Jack D
- Keith Cassidy
- Emma Murdock
- DJ Precious
- Jenny
- Rachel
- Will
- Spencer James
- Poppy
- Olivia Peden
- Zoe Wilson

== Blast Xtra ==
Blast Xtra was the online training station of Blast 106, this ceased broadcasting in September 2015 after 5 years on air.

== Licence Breach ==
In August 2013 the station was found in breach of its licence. Communications regulator Ofcom found that the station was not meeting its licence obligations.

However in a court ruling against Ofcom the station won the right to continue broadcasting. The ruling which was delivered just hours before the station's licence was due to expire, the judge held that the process was unfair and disproportionate. The regulator's decision was quashed and an extension of Blast 106's community radio licence was granted. After hearing submissions the judge sat to give his verdict just before the expiry deadline. He held that Ofcom ignored a request from Blast 106's solicitors for an oral hearing after learning the regulator's preliminary view. A decision was made not to consider sanctions over the alleged breach - which would have involved due process safeguards. That meant all that was left to consider was the station's application in January for an extension to its licence.

The Ofcom report said: "During the three days in January 2013 and two days in November 2012 when we monitored output, we heard no local student news, coverage of student sports events, documentaries, or coverage of student politics."

The station responded by explaining that the days that Ofcom performed monitoring were exceptions to normal output, however following a subsequent monitoring period the station was again found to be under delivering its key commitments. The report concluded;

"As set out above, we have taken into account the following matters"

- The combination in ‘daytime’ output of a high volume of music (more than 90%) with very little speech of specific relevance to the target community;
- A very modest amount of speech output of direct relevance and interest to the primary target community, broadcast in the evenings only;
- A lack of variety in the music output except in specialist programmes; and
- Certain speech material not being featured in output for much of the year.

Communications watchdog Ofcom then went to the Court of Appeal after the decision to extend Blast 106's licence.

It was claimed that the case should instead have been sent back for the regulator to make a fresh decision following that ruling.

But senior judges in Belfast held that the body could not have carried out a fair re-hearing before the station's broadcasting permit expired.

Dismissing the appeal, Lord Justice Girvan said: "To refuse to make an order requiring an extension would be to visit on the licence holder a disproportionately unfair result compared to the alleged unfairness to Ofcom in having to grant a licence which, if abused, could be revoked."
