= Basht. =

Irish post-punk band

- Basht. performing at The Great Escape Festival in Brighton in May 2025

Background information
- Origin: Dublin, Ireland
- Genres: Post-punk, alternative rock
- Years active: 2021–present
- Label: LAB
- Spinoffs: Bleech 9:3
- Members: Jack Leavey; Lughaidh Armstrong-Mayock; Louis Christle; Ryan McClelland
- Past members: Jake Brennan; Sam Duffy; Luke O'Neill

Basht. [sic] are an Irish post-punk and alternative rock band formed in Dublin in 2021. The band consists of Jack Leavey (vocals and guitar), Lughaidh Armstrong-Mayock (lead guitar), Louis Christle (bass) and Ryan McClelland (drums).

The group released two EPs, Dirty White Lies (2024) and Bitter and Twisted (2025), before their debut studio album, Poor Advice, was released through LAB Records on 9 October 2026. The album reached number seven on the Irish Albums Chart and number one on the Irish Independent Albums Chart.

== History ==
=== Formation and early releases (2021–2025) ===
Basht. were formed in Dublin in 2021 by vocalist and guitarist Jack Leavey, who had initially been looking for musicians to accompany a solo project. After meeting bassist Louis Christle, the two began developing the project as a band. The lineup was rounded out by Sam Duffy on guitar and Luke O'Neill on drums.

Their first EP, Dirty White Lies, was released in 2024, followed by Bitter and Twisted in 2025. The band toured the United Kingdom and Ireland and supported acts including Wunderhorse, DEADLETTER, Everything Everything and Miles Kane.

The lineup changed during this period. Lughaidh Armstrong-Mayock initially joined as a touring guitarist before becoming involved in the band's songwriting. Drummer Ryan McClelland subsequently joined, completing the four-member lineup in 2025.

=== Poor Advice (2026) ===
In April 2026, Basht. announced their debut studio album, Poor Advice, and released its lead single, "Perfume". The song was produced by Ali Chant. Leavey described its subject as a son looking back on the breakdown of his parents' marriage, with the lyrics also addressing the historical influence of the Catholic Church on private life in Ireland.

The band worked on material for the album while touring, developing songs during rehearsals and soundchecks. The recording sessions were undertaken with producer Ali Chant.

Poor Advice was released on 9 October 2026 through LAB Records. The ten-track album addresses institutional authority, religion and political conflict. In an interview with Hot Press, Leavey discussed the use of biblical imagery in the lyrics and the influence of contemporary conflicts on songs including "Terror TV" and "Circadia".

The album entered the Irish Albums Chart at number seven on 16 October 2026. It also debuted at number one on the Irish Independent Albums Chart.

Following the album's release, Basht. announced a headline tour of the United Kingdom beginning in October 2026 and a sold-out concert at the Button Factory in Dublin in November. Leavey's father had previously managed the venue when it was known as the Temple Bar Music Centre.

== Musical style ==
Basht.'s music has been described as post-punk and alternative rock. Their songs feature distorted guitars, bass-driven arrangements and changes between quieter passages and heavier sections. The Irish Times compared their sound to a combination of Radiohead and Nirvana in its review of Poor Advice.

The band's members have discussed their interest in music outside conventional guitar-based rock. In an October 2026 interview with Hot Press, Christle described listening to 1990s house and 1980s Detroit techno, particularly the use of drum machines.

The lyrics of Poor Advice draw on religious imagery and political subjects. Leavey has identified the relationship between religious and political authority in Ireland as one of the album's recurring concerns.

== Critical reception ==
Poor Advice received a five-star review from Tony Clayton-Lea of The Irish Times. Clayton-Lea compared the band's sound to Radiohead and Nirvana and noted the album's changes in dynamics and politically focused lyrics.

Riccardo Dwyer of Hot Press awarded the album 7.5 out of 10. His review discussed the album's intensity and its treatment of religion and political conflict.

== Band members ==
=== Current members ===
- Jack Leavey – lead vocals, guitar
- Lughaidh Armstrong-Mayock – lead guitar
- Louis Christle – bass guitar
- Ryan McClelland – drums

=== Former members ===
- Sam Duffy – lead guitar
- Luke O'Neill – drums
- Jake Brennan – drums

== Discography ==
=== Studio albums ===
Year	Title	Label	Irish Albums Chart peak
2026	Poor Advice	LAB Records	7

=== Extended plays ===
Year	Title
2024	Dirty White Lies
2025	Bitter and Twisted
