= Pzazz =

- Origin: Ireland
- Genre: Classical
- Website: Official site

Pzazz are a group of Irish sopranos.

The women include Claire Halligan and Fiona McManus. Three of the women are classically trained sopranos. They all had performing experience before joining the group. Halligan had toured and performed with numerous orchestras, appearing on TV and singing and acting in a number of stage productions. McManus had appeared on TV's Popstars and had obtained a music degree from Trinity College.

They have released one single, "Daughter of Connolly", which is about James Connolly.

Pzazz completed their national tour of Ireland, supporting The Celtic Tenors in late December 2005/January 2006. They received a considerable amount of media attention in Ireland around April/May 2006, when they appeared in many magazines (The Star, News of the World), newspapers (The Irish Times, Irish Independent, Irish Examiner), national radio (BBC Radio Ulster, RTÉ with Tom McGurk), and television (RTÉ's Nationwide, TV3's Ireland AM).
