= Federico Buffa =

Italian journalist, writer and television sportscaster

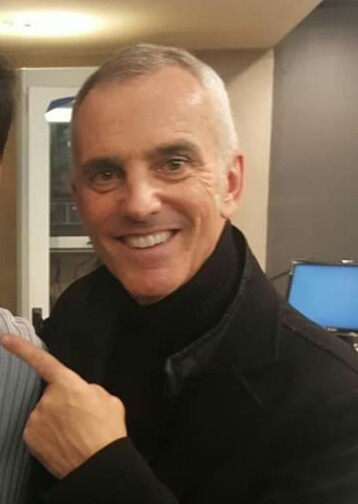
- Born: Federico Buffa; 28 July 1959 (age 66); Milan, Italy

Federico Buffa (born 28 July 1959 in Milan) is an Italian journalist, writer and television sportscaster.

He studied sociology at UCLA Summer Session in 1978. In 1984, he started as sportive journalist for the matches disputed by Pallacanestro Olimpia Milano basket team and, from the 7h championship game, he shared the microphone together with the Italian journalist Flavio Tranquillo.

In 1986 he graduated in Law at the University of Milan with a dissertation on the sports employment contracts. In the same year he become a professional journalist and wrote his first article for Italian Magazine "Superbasket" (which has been published on September's Number). Two years later he began working as basketball agent and started his career as NBA's commentator for Italian TV. Since May 2014 he directed the ten-episode program titled Federico Buffa racconta Storie Mondiali ("Federico Buffa tells World Cup Stories") which was aired on Sky Sport TV.

In 2015 he presented the documentary series on Sky Italia called Federico Buffa racconta: Storie di campioni about the lives of legendary footballers including George Best, Johan Cruyff and Ferenc Puskas.

He still works as journalist for Sky Sport Italia and Milan Channel.

== Works ==
- Black Jesus. Un grande viaggio nel basket americano in 23+1 fermate. Libri di Sport. 2002. ISBN 978-88-87676-10-5.
- Black Jesus. The anthology. Libri di Sport. 2005. ISBN 978-88-87676-68-6.
