= No Monster Club =

Irish indie pop band

- Origin: Dublin, Ireland
- Genres: Indie pop; Art pop; Lo-fi music
- Years active: 2009–present
- Labels: Popical Island; Already Dead Tapes and Records; Mirror Universe Tapes; CF Records; Emotional Response Records

No Monster Club is the DIY indie pop project of Irish musician Bobby Aherne, also known as Dublin Duck Dispensary and Sir Bobby Jukebox.

Since their debut release in 2009, they have recorded a number of albums, split releases and EPs, alternating between a solo project and a full band.

The music video for their 2012 single La La Land was named as one of Nialler9's "50 best Irish music videos of all-time" and was screened as part of Adam Buxton's series, BUG: The Evolution of Music Video, at the BFI. The band performed on Chic-a-Go-Go in 2013 and performed a WFMU session in 2016. Their song The Trundling Path featured in a 2025 episode of Welcome to Night Vale. They have also toured several times with The Polyphonic Spree.

An alternate version of their single Arms Across America was used as the theme song of The Alison Spittle Show podcast. Their 2015 single I've Retired was featured in the movie Let The Wrong One In. They contributed original music to the Dublin Fringe Festival musical Trial of the Centurys, and to the RTÉ Jr Radio series Nero's Class.

== Musical style ==
According to AllMusic biographer Marcy Donelson, No Monster Club "merges retro-minded garage-pop and elements of lo-fi psychedelia with passionate performances and ever-present tunefulness".

In a review of 2016's I Feel Magic album, The Irish Times drew comparisons to the songwriting styles of Kevin Ayers, Syd Barrett and Nikki Sudden. In his 2019 book Perfect Sound Whatever, James Acaster called this album "A good old quirky bit of fun".

Some influences cited by the group include Animal Collective, Lionel Bart and ABBA.

== Discography ==
=== Studio albums ===
- Tropical Decibels Volume One (2009)
- Tropical Decibels Volume Two (2010)
- BRAIN HEAT WAVE (2010)
- Dublin (2012)
- Posthumous Hits (2012)
- Foie Gras (2013)
- People Are Weird (2015)
- I Feel Magic (2016)
- deadbeat effervescent (2022)

=== EPs ===
- Young Guts Champion (2011)
- Panda Kid Meet No Monster Club (2011)
- The Community Games (2013)
- Where Did You Get That Milkshake? (2016)
