= Demise: Rise of the Ku'tan =

2000 role-playing video game

- Developer: Artifact Entertainment
- Publisher: IPC Software
- Platform: Microsoft Windows
- Release: NA: 15 January 2000
- Genre: Role-playing video game
- Modes: Single-player; Co-operative multiplayer

Demise: Rise of the Ku'tan is a medieval fantasy role-playing video game released in 2000 for Microsoft Windows, developed by Artifact Entertainment and published by IPC Software. The game features the same setting as Mordor: The Depths of Dejenol, which was also developed by designer David Allen.

== Gameplay ==
In Demise: Rise of the Ku'tan, Lord Gherrick's city is attacked by demons emerging from the mines of Dejenol. After the assault is quelled, the player is dispatched into the mines in an attempt to locate and destroy the primordial evil at its center. The game world is split between a town and a dungeon; the former features guilds, a merchant, a morgue and several other locations, while the latter houses monsters, which must be destroyed during the course of the players' explorations. At the outset, users are required to create an avatar with particular racial traits, classes, and starting statistics, and develop the character as they progress within the game. This development is achieved by gaining experience, measured as a statistic, and equipping improved weaponry, found in the dungeon or purchased from the town merchant. Furthermore, the game features up to 16 players in a co-operative multiplayer mode.

A beta version of an expanded version of the game named Ascension was published in 2011 by a group of enthusiastic players headed by Decklin (Richard Whitwell).

== Reception ==
Reception

Aggregate score
Aggregator	Score
GameRankings	46%

Review scores
Publication	Score
Computer Games Strategy Plus	3.5/5
GameSpot	3.7/10
GameSpy	70%
PC Accelerator	7/10
PC Zone	11%

Upon release, the game received unfavourable reviews according to the review aggregation website GameRankings. GameSpot were dismissive, arguing that the game lacked either "an engrossing story or an online multiplayer game with a sprawling world to explore." Even the most amiable of reviewers complained of the game's interface, poor graphics and tedious sound effects, while PC Zone commented that the fact "there is 3D acceleration support is risible, as are the graphical options to enable or disable detail and effects." Conversely, positive remarks were made regarding the variety of equipment, spells and the ability to combine classes.

The game was nominated for the "Worst Game of the Year" award at GameSpot's Best and Worst of 2000 Awards, which went to Blaze and Blade: Eternal Quest.

== Availability ==
Development of the game continues as of August 2016, with the developers having released version 1.06 build 721. The game itself can be purchased from the developer's website. The game will run on most Windows systems including 64-bit platforms. Extensive personal support is provided through the message board on the official site.
