= Floyd Soul and the Wolf =

Irish rock band

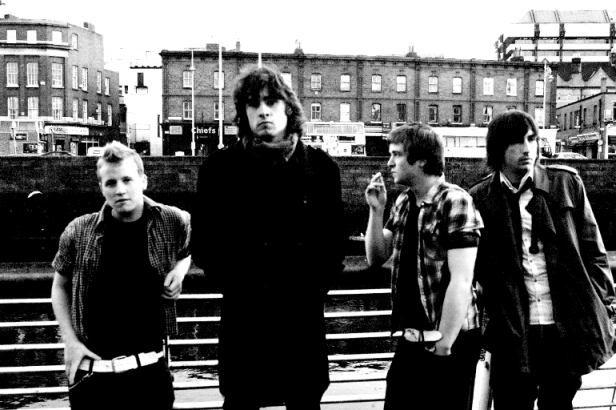
- Floyd Soul and the Wolf photographed in Dublin, Ireland, 2008; L-R: Deano Moran, Floyd Soul, Ciaran Delaney, Simon Merriman

Background information
- Origin: Waterford, Ireland
- Genres: Rock, alternative rock, country rock,
- Members: Floyd Soul; Deano Moran; Simon Merriman; Ciaran Delaney

Floyd Soul and the Wolf were a rock band from Waterford, Ireland. Formed in 2004 between cousins Luke Heffernan (Floyd Soul) and Deano Moran, they soon recruited Simon Merriman who asked drummer Ciaran Delaney to join. The band's original influences were Neil Young, The Rolling Stones, and Van Morrison, but over the years their influences diversified to include punk, electronica, and hard rock.

In April 2008, the band won The Irish National Student Music Awards. This was followed up by the release of their single "Give It A Chance". The track was well received nationwide and on the strength of it the band spent three months touring Ireland, playing venues such as Whelan's in Dublin and Cyprus Avenue in Cork. Inspired by Bruce Springsteen's Darkness Tour, the band marketed their tour in the same way, calling it the Give It A Chance Tour.

In February 2009 Floyd Soul and the Wolf released their third single entitled "Absinthe". Released as a free download to the public, it saw the band gain significant national exposure.

In September 2009 the band recorded their debut album in Nashville, Tennessee with Nanci Griffith producer and guitarist Thomm Jutz. It is set for release in 2010.

In October 2009 the band made available home footage from their recording sessions in Nashville, and further footage is set to follow.

Also in 2009, former WWE executive and wrestler Shane McMahon announced he was a fan, branding them 'the greatest Irish rock band of all time'.

== Discography ==
=== Singles ===
- 2008 : "Give It A Chance"
- 2008 : "Bottle of Booze"
- 2009 : "Absinthe"

== Band members ==
- Floyd Soul – vocals, guitar, harmonica
- Deano Moran – guitar, vocals
- Simon Merriman – bass, vocals, percussion
- Ciarán Delaney – drums, vocals
