= Sky Sport =

Sky Sport or Sky Sports may refer to:

- Sky Group
  - Sky Sports, a group of sports television channels available in the UK and Ireland
  - Sky Sport (Germany), a group of sports television channels available in Germany, Austria and Switzerland, formerly called Premiere Sport
  - Sky Sport (Italy), a group of sports television channels available in Italy
- Sky Sports (Mexico), a group of sports television channels available in Mexico and Central America.
- Sky Sports (South Korean TV channel) - Sports television channel in South Korea, Owned by KT Skylife
- Sky Sport (New Zealand), a group of New Zealand sports television channels
