= True Tides =

Irish band

True Tides, are an Irish band originating in Cork composed of brothers Eoghan (guitarist and backing vocalist) and Cian (vocalist and guitarist) and Conor MacSweeny (percussionist). The band released their first single "Higher" in April, 2018. The band is signed to Warner Music Ireland and were previously managed by Lars Kaye. In May, 2022 the band released its single "Beating Heart". Concerning genre the band's style has been described as synth pop by music critics. The band members are all alumni of Cork School of Music. In 2021 the band's single "I Can't Wait" was nominated for the RTÉ choice music prize.
