= The Tyrades =

American punk garage band

- Origin: Buffalo, New York
- Genres: Garage punk
- Years active: 2001–present
- Labels: Big Neck, Broken Rekids, Rip Off, Shit Sandwich, Die Slaughterhaüs, SmartGuy
- Members: Jenna Tyrade; Jimmy Ordinary; Robert Miscellaneous; Frankie Jensen
- Past members: Dave Unlikely

The Tyrades were a four-piece punk/garage band formed in Buffalo, New York.

In 2001, the band released the single "Detonation", consisting of four songs, one of which was a The Dicks cover. Maximum Rocknroll thought the songs "would be classics had they come out in 1979". The reviewer described the gaarage sound as "a thin, tinny sound mat perfectly fits the hollow /echoey female vocals and guitars that alternate between starkness and blaring".

"I Got a Lot" was one of two 7 inches released in 2002. It was singled out by Maximum Rocknroll, which also commented a live show in San Francisco in October 2002: "This is what punk and new wave and rock should be now. [...] Singer Jenna stands on stage with an air of Black Flag-era Rollins and belts out tunes with her amazing voice. The band has such a great style: simplistic, staticy, new-wavy punk". "Stain on Me" also got positive mentions.

The band's first full-length album was self-titled, and was released on September 16, 2003. It received a four-star rating from AllMusic, which praised the band's "knack for direct, almost poppy, punk rock songs that manage to be catchy without sounding calculated". Maximum Rocknroll opined that the album "absolutely blows away their three previous singles", and that "you can't help but be totally blown out and blown away by what they captured here". Punk Planet suggeested it as "one of the best records of the year", with the reviewer praising "Their insanely frenetic and art-tinged style of punk rock". Razorcake similarly wrote: "The playing’s perfectly demented, skewed, and always rushing forward, sort of like a drug-manic early, proto Devo mated to a band that sounds like they break metric tons of instruments". Clamor recommended purchasing it as well. Abroad, Ox-Fanzine gave it an 8 out of 10 rating, stating that Tyrades "sound like the reincarnation of a '78 Bay Area punk band—super-aggressive, simple, fast, and raspy, with a tiny but noticeable new wave influence".

"Incarcerated" came as a 7 inch in 2004. This included a Wire cover. Razorcake wrote on the purported failure of the musicians; among others, the guitar playing could be described as "for saying you don’t know how to play, you sure get a lot out of it". Tyrades was "not about finesse", but presented "good stuff"; "snarling, gnashing, just-smart-enough, just-dumb-enough punk rock that’s pretty fuckin’ perfect for this dude right here".

"I Am Homicide" was "done right" according to Punk Planet, "purely effin' great" and might be "the best of what they've done so far". Razorcake agreed that acquiring the single was a "no-brainer".

"On Your Video" was whole-heartedly recommended by Maximum Rocknroll. Commenting that the songs were left over from the band's previous releases, the reviewer wrote: "Most bands would sell their souls to have three songs this good on their LP, but bands like Tyrades really spread the quality around. They haven't made a wrong move yet... and show no signs of making one any time soon. Buy everything with their name on it". Razorcake opined that "On Your Video" was "great, great stuff"—more of the same that had made the band "popular amongst people who would be attracted to a band that puts out seventeen-minute full-lengths".

Jim McCann also played in Baseball Furies, Gallery Night and White Savage, among others.

== Band members ==
=== Current members ===
- Jenna Tyrade (Jenna Abraham) – vocals
- Jimmy Ordinary (Jim McCann) – guitar
- Robert Miscellaneous (Robert McAdams) – bass
- Frankie Jensen – drums

=== Former members ===
- Dave Unlikely (drums)

== Discography ==
=== Albums ===
- Tyrades (Broken Rekids, 2003)

=== Singles ===
- "On Your Video" (SmartGuy, 2005)
- "Incarcerated" (Die Slaughterhaüs, 2004)
- "I Am Homicide" (Shit Sandwich, 2004)
- "I Got a Lot" (Broken Rekids, 2002)
- "Stain on Me" (Rip Off, 2002)
- "Detonation" (Big Neck, 2001)
