= Payola (Northern Irish band) =

Pay*ola
- Origin: Northern Ireland, UK
- Genres: Rock
- Years active: 1998–present
- Labels: Tomcat Records; Gimp International Records
- Members: Philip McCarroll; Nick Joseph; Nicky Conway; James Nicholl

Pay*Ola are a Northern Irish hard rock band formed in Belfast, Northern Ireland in 1998.

The band consists of:

- Philip McCarroll (Lead Vocals/Rhythm Guitar)
- Nick Joseph (Guitar, Keyboards and Backing Vocals)
- Nicky Conway (Bass)
- James Nicholl (Drums)

== History ==
=== Formation ===
Philip McCarroll, previously of the band Lazy, formed Pay*Ola in 1998. Their first E.P., Stick 2 Fingers Up, was released on Good Vibrations Records. Pay*Ola first rose to prominence in 2000 when they starred in an episode of the short-lived BBC/[RTE] documentary series Ferry Tales. The episode charted the band's journey from Belfast to a gig in London. The episode featured seven of the band's original songs.

=== Felix ===
Pay*Ola gained popularity throughout 2001 and 2002 when their song, "Felix" from The Felix E.P. was played extensively on one of Northern Ireland's most popular radio stations, Cool FM. "Felix" was also chosen as one of 60 finalists in the 2002 'International Songwriting Competition'. They released their third E.P., More Iconic Than Ironicin May 2002, songs from which were played extensively during gigs up and down Northern Ireland, including major NI radio hit "Carter's Song".

=== Audioslave ===
In 2003, Pay*Ola supported American rock band, Audioslave in Dublin while on tour. This single gig alone rocketed Pay*Ola's name to the top of many radio playlists and boosted their cult following in Ireland. It is claimed that all of Pay*Ola's merchandise sold out within 30 minutes.

In 2003, they also played at the Big Buzz Irish Entertainment Awards and also released their Rather Be Dreaming EP in that same year and remains one of their most popular yet.

=== Try Everything 2wice ===
In 2005, Pay*Ola released their first album, Try Everything 2wice, launching the album in a gig in Virgin Megastore, Belfast that pulled in crowds from the street, able to have been heard as far away as Belfast City Hall. Maintained as one of the Empire Music Hall's most popular headlining bands in Belfast having topped the bill at the venue on almost 20 occasions, Pay*Ola enjoy a thriving cult following throughout Northern Ireland.

== 77 Miles ==
Pay*ola had a busy end to 2006, including an Irish tour with British rock legends Status Quo. It remains their biggest gig to date with well over six thousand people in attendance during the gig, and support slots with L.A sleaze rockers Buckcherry, and Australian superstar Jimmy Barnes. During that period they also recorded new tracks at Manor Park Studios for the "77 Miles" E.P - which was eventually released in July 2007 - once again, it was launched with a Saturday night headline show in the Empire Music Hall, Belfast. This show also happened to be the last featuring original drummer James Nicholl, who bowed out due to family commitments. The band found an immediate replacement in Adam Callaghan, and have played a string of dates around Ireland (as well as a festival show in Ipswich) with the new line-up in late 2007.

== The Colour Red ==
Thursday the 11 December 2008 saw the official launch of Pay*ola's Colour Red E.P. with a headline show in the Empire Music Hall, Belfast. The night proved to be a great success, drawing a healthy bunch of enthusiastic punters. The "Colour Red Campaign" is set to continue through 2009 with more local dates being scheduled, as well as visits to Scotland in the pipeline.

== Discography ==
=== Albums ===
- Try Everything 2wice (2005)
- Optimism Will Destroy Me (2010)

=== EPs ===
- Stick 2 Fingers Up (1999)
- The Felix EP (2001)
- More Iconic Than Ironic (2002)
- Rather Be Dreaming (2003)
- 77 Miles (2007)
- The Colour Red EP (2008)
- Hope & Design EP (2012)
