= Lovechild (band) =

Indie rock band from Belfast, Northern Ireland

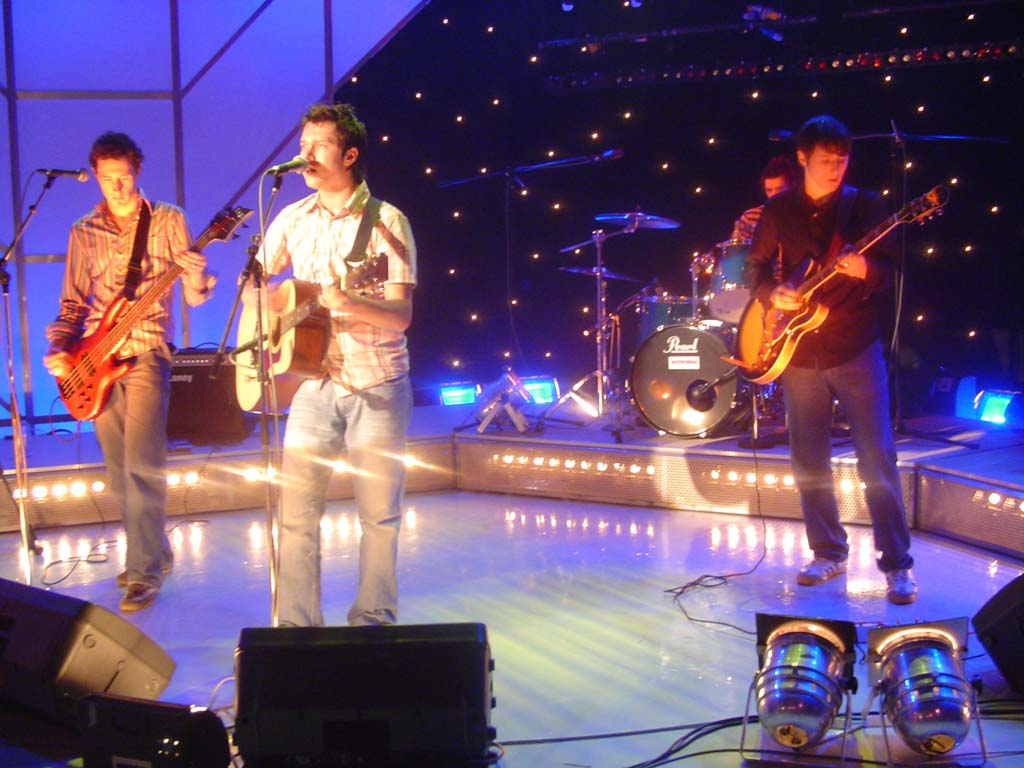

Background information
- Origin: Belfast, Northern Ireland, United Kingdom
- Genres: Indie rock
- Years active: 2002–2005
- Labels: MusicBest; Chromium; Friendly Fire; EMI
- Members: David McClean; Luke Mathers; Lewis Woods; Rodger Firmin
- Website: https://myspace.com/lovechildbanduk

Lovechild are a rock and indie band from Belfast, Northern Ireland. They first rose to prominence in 2003 with their first two singles "Hope You Have a Lovely Day", and "The Siren". Regular gigs at Belfast venues such as The Empire, Mandela Hall, The Rosetta as well as festivals like Glasgowbury, saw them build their following.

== Band members ==
- David McClean – Vocals, Guitar
- Luke Mathers – Lead Guitar
- Lewis Woods – Bass
- Rodger Firmin – Drums

== Early exposure ==
The band gained notoriety when "Hope You Have A Lovely Day" was chosen as part of a North American ad campaign by VisitBritain.ca in order to increase tourism to the United Kingdom. The song was featured on the accompanying album Visit Britain Rocks, released on EMI. Following this, their songs found their way onto many soundtracks including for the adventure documentary series "This Is The Sea" by filmmaker Justine Curgenven, which played on National Geographic Channel, Sky, and BBC television. Volume One featured "Hope You Have A Lovely Day" and "The Siren", while Volume Two featured "Killin' Me". Both received DVD release. They won the Belfast Empire heat of GBOB in winter 2004, and toured continuously over the following months. The Friendly Fire EP gained favourable press reviews in publications such as Logo Magazine, Juxta Fanzine, Big List and The Fly UK Gig Guide.

== Related acts ==
Mathers and Firmin would go on to form Unquiet Nights in 2010.

== Discography ==
- The Siren (CD single) (2003)
- The Friendly Fire EP (CD & Digital release) (2004)
