= Empire Circus =

Irish rock band

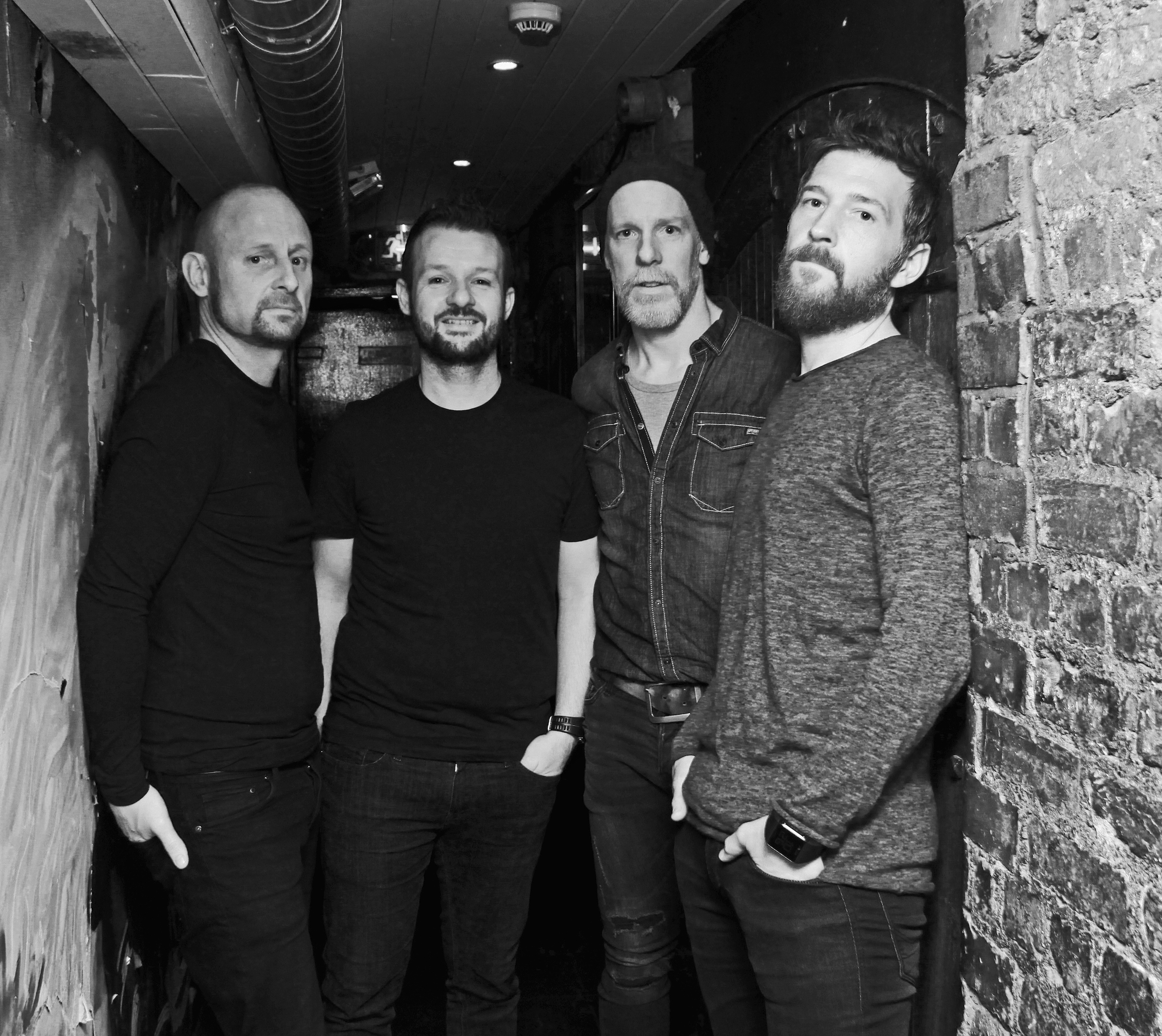

Background information
- Origin: Dublin, Ireland
- Genres: Indie rock, alternative rock, folk rock
- Years active: 2012–present
- Label: Paper Scissors Rock
- Spinoff of: Stand
- Members: Neil Eurelle; Alan Doyle; David Walsh; Brian Ellis

Empire Circus are a four piece alt-rock band from Dublin, Ireland.

The band was formed in 2012 by the remaining members of the rock group 'Stand' following their break up in 2010. As 'Stand', the group had released a number of albums and singles, reaching number 9 in the Irish Singles Chart in 1998 with Questions, and number 23 with Breathing But There's No Air in the same year.

As Empire Circus, the group recorded twelve tracks in 2012 with producer and engineer Bryce Goggin, and released an album titled Empire Circus in 2013. The band followed-up with a second studio album, titled Tí, in February 2019.

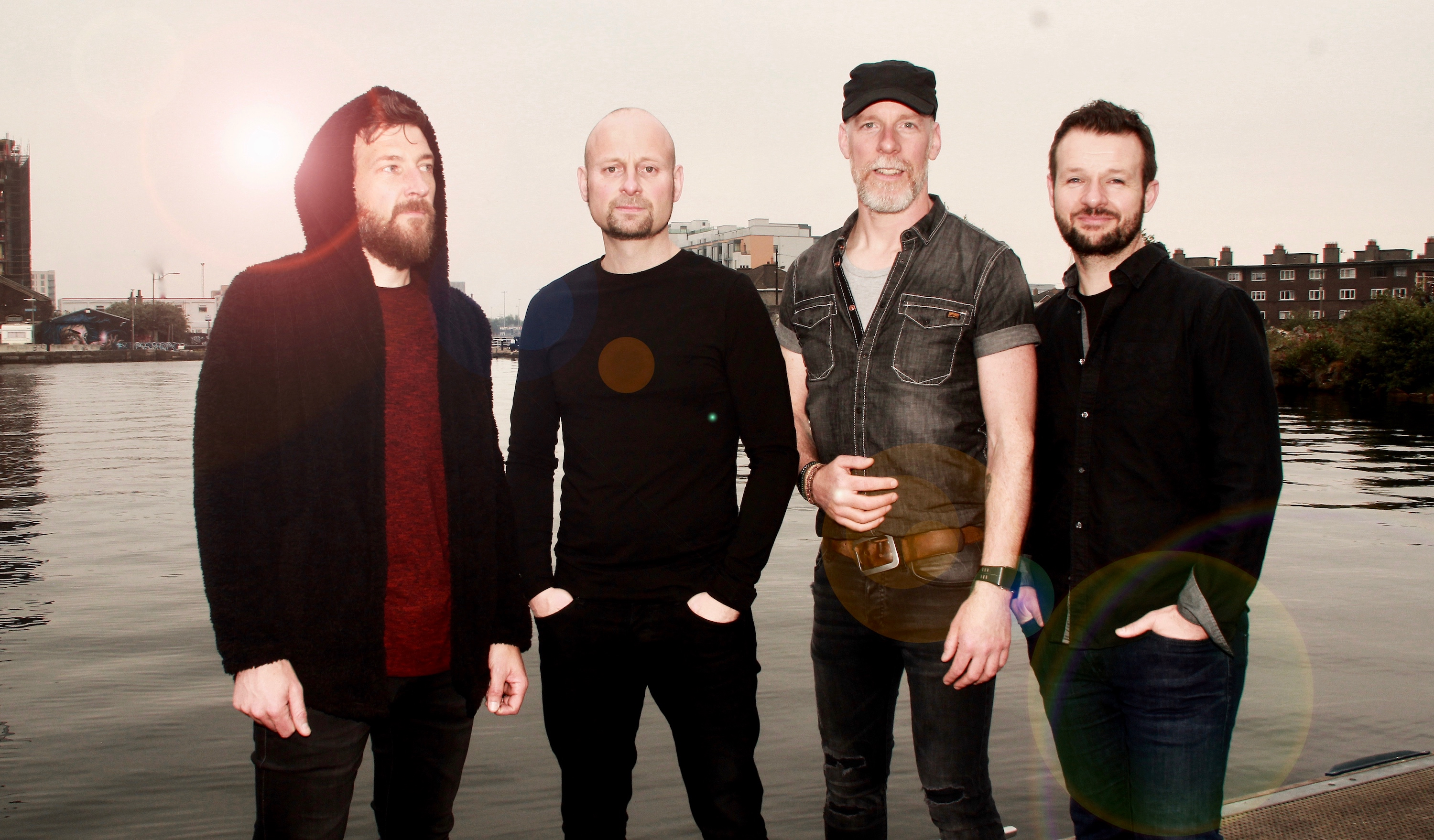
Alan Doyle, Brian Ellis, Neil Eurelle, David Walsh

As well as writing and recording, the members of Empire Circus run a music school, PureMusic, in Dublin.

== Line-up ==
=== Current members ===
- Alan Doyle - Vocals, Guitar
- Neil Eurelle - Bass, Vocals
- David Walsh - Guitar, Keyboards
- Brian Ellis - Drums
