= The Demise =

- Origin: Limerick, Ireland
- Genres: Punk rock
- Years active: 2004 – present
- Members: Mike Nolan – Guitar/Vocals; Fabian Barrett – Bass/Vocals; Kieran Hayes – Drums/Vocals; James Nestor – Guitar/Vocals
- Past members: Daniel Purcell; Greg Ellerker
- Website: Official Site; Bebo Page; MySpace Page

The Demise are a 4-piece Irish punk rock band from Limerick city, Ireland and are also the founding members of the mangaboy¦records music collective in Limerick city. They have been playing shows and recording music since 2004. For most of the time they have been around they were a 3-piece with just Mike, Fabian and Kieran in the band after Greg left. But then decided to get another guitarist which ended up being James. They have played all over Ireland and also in Germany and have supported bands like Capdown, The Supersuckers and Gang Green.

In 2006 they entered the Coca-Cola Blastbeat National Competition of over 400 bands and reached the finals. As a result of winning the regional heats the song "Right on Time" was recorded in The Factory recording studio in Dublin and was included in the Coca-Cola Blastbeat Vol. 4 Double CD which reached No. 16 in The Irish compilation charts. In 2007 they were picked to play the 2FM 2MORO TOUR with The Flaws, Messiah J & The Expert and also another limerick band, Giveamanakick in Trinity Rooms, Limerick.

They have also had local and national radio air play which includes the Live 95FM Breakfast Show and also Dan Hegarty's show on 2FM as part of the 2FM 2MORO TOUR.

In the closing months of 2007 the Band went into the studio to work on their first full-length album, working with producer Owen Lewis at Breakline Productions as well as the famous Grouse Lodge Studios in County Westmeath, a studio which has recorded artists such as Snow Patrol, Bloc Party, Muse and Michael Jackson and was also used to record R.E.M.'s 14th Studio album.

In April 2008 the group released their first single from these recording sessions entitled "Social Suicide". This song was only released as a digital download.

The Demise supported Rise Against at The Academy, Dublin, Ireland on 19 February 2009.

== Discography ==
- What We Leave Behind EP (2005)
  Recorded at Balls of Iron Studios, Limerick

1. Nothing Left To Lose
2. The Fear
3. The Riff
4. Do You Believe
5. I Know, You Don't
6. The Last One
7. Hooked on sorrow

- Right on Time EP (2006)
  Recorded at Breakline Productions, Limerick

1. The Vengeance
2. Right on Time
3. Gone Without A Trace

- Self-Titled First Full Length Album (2008)
  In Production at Breakline Productions And Grouse Lodge
- Social Suicide – Single (2008)
  Released for download in April 2008.

=== Other releases ===
- Coca-Cola Blastbeat Vol. 4 (2006)
  Recorded at the Factory, Dublin

"Right on Time" is featured on disc 2, track 3.
