= 2010 in Irish music =

A summary of the year 2010 in the Irish music industry.

== Summary ==
=== January ===
- On 7 January, the nominees for the 2010 Meteor Awards were announced.
- On 11 January, Neil Hannon was nominated in the Original Score category at the 7th Irish Film and Television Awards for his soundtrack to the film Wide Open Spaces.
- On 13 January, the nominees for Best Album of 2009 at the Choice Music Prize were announced.
- On 14 January, the BBC admitted giving "inappropriate" promotional coverage and "undue prominence" to U2 and their 2009 album No Line on the Horizon through their use of the U2 = BBC slogan.
- From 14 to 16 January: And So I Watch You From Afar, Delorentos, Imelda May and Villagers represented Ireland in the Eurosonic Festival in Groningen, Netherlands. It was broadcast live in Ireland on RTÉ 2fm.
- Aftermath of 2010 Haiti earthquake:
  - 15 January: Concern Worldwide's Emergency Appeal fundraiser was held at the weekly Rock' n' Roll club Shakedown in Pacino's on Suffolk Street, Dublin 2.
  - 22 January: Bono performed the collaborative effort "Stranded (Haiti Mon Amour)" at the live televised Hope for Haiti Now: A Global Benefit for Earthquake Relief charity telethon.
  - 24 January: Glen Hansard performed a benefit concert for Haiti in Whelan's, Dublin.
  - 24 January: Noise Control headlined the Help Haiti Fundraising Extravaganza in the Twisted Pepper, Middle Abbey Street, Dublin 2.
  - 31 January: The Answer and David Holmes were among the headlining acts at the Belfast 4 Haiti event.
- On 31 January, the 52nd Grammy Awards took place in Los Angeles, United States. Beoga were nominated in the Best Contemporary World Music Album category for their album The Incident. U2 received three nominations. Imelda May performed at the awards ceremony alongside Jeff Beck on the Les Paul tribute, "How High the Moon". May, the second Irish act to perform at the awards in their history, was praised by American critics for "the strong Irish inflection of her pronunciation".

=== February ===
- Aftermath of 2010 Haiti earthquake:
  - On 3 February, Michelle Doherty hosted Haiti Aid at Whelan's and The Village in Dublin, featuring Ham Sandwich, O Emperor, The Chapters and Patrick Kelleher.
  - On 11 February, Cathy Davey, The Chapters, Julie Feeney and Villagers were scheduled to perform at a Drop Haiti's Debt fundraiser in Vicar Street. This was later cancelled due to "unavoidable circumstances".
  - On 27 February, Clash Jam Wallop, The Dubtones, Aces Wild, Primitevo and Skelton Crew are among the acts scheduled to perform at Aid for Haiti in Button Factory, Dublin.
- In February 2010, U2 won "Best Live Production" for their U2 360° Tour at the 2009 Total Production Awards in London.
- On 19 February, the 2010 Ireland Music Awards took place at the RDS in Dublin, presented by Amanda Byram.
- On 23 February, the first 33 acts were announced at the Oxegen 2010 launch at The Academy.
- On 26 February, Eleanor McEvoy began her 2010 Australian Tour at Nannup Folk Festival in Western Australia, with the final date due on 21 March as part of the Saint Patrick's Day Parade in Sydney.
- On 26 February, Prince settled his court case with MCD Productions which had sued the musician after he cancelled a 2008 Croke Park concert at short notice.

=== March ===
- On 3 March, the Choice Music Prize for Irish Album of the Year 2009 was awarded during a live ceremony at Vicar Street, Dublin. It was awarded to Adrian Crowley for his album Season of the Sparks.
- On 4 March, The Saw Doctors commenced their first Australian tour for seventeen years in Perth. The tour included a Saint Patrick's Day show in Sydney.
- On 8 March, Arcade Fire and Fatboy Slim were announced for Oxegen 2010, with this being Arcade Fire's first 2010 European show to be announced.
- On 12 March, the 20th anniversary show of Power of Dreams's internationally successful album Immigrants, Emigrants and Me took place at Whelan's in Dublin.
- On 12 and 13 March, Delorentos and Something Happens performed at a festival event for Saint Patrick's Day in Den Haag (The Hague).
- Between 15 and 20 March 2010: The Waterboys performed twenty poems by William Butler Yeats set to music in the Abbey Theatre, Dublin. All dates had sold out by January: a fifth date was announced for 20 November at the Grand Canal Theatre.
- On 17 March, Laura Izibor attended a party at the White House, Washington, D.C., United States at the invitation of President of the United States Barack Obama.
- On 17 and 19 March, Irish artists performed at South by Southwest (SXSW) in Austin, Texas, United States.
- On 19 March, the first acts of the 2010 Indie-pendence line-up were announced.
- On 23 March, Christy Moore and John Spillane performed a show in aid of the 2010 Haiti earthquake at Vicar Street, with proceeds given to GOAL.
- On 24 March, Electric Picnic 2010 was launched.
- On 25 March, the 2010 IMRO Showcase Tour began in Belfast, continuing until 1 May at The Academy, Dublin.
- On 30 March, several new additions to the Oxegen 2010 line-up were announced: these included Dizzee Rascal, Julian Casablancas, Groove Armada, The Black Keys, The Cribs, The Stranglers and Earth, Wind & Fire.

=== April ===
- On 2 April (Good Friday), Dave Couse released his third solo album Alonewalk featuring a duet with Cathal Coughlan on the track "Good Friday".
- On 7 April, the line-up for Castlepalooza was announced, with tickets going on sale two days later.
- On 8 April, six bands competed in the King Kong Club Grand Final music competition at The Village in Dublin.
- On 16 April, Ireland's first National Music Day took place, with free live events around the country in locations such as Cork, Limerick and Portlaoise being broadcast on RTÉ lyric fm.
- On 13 April, Mindfield, scheduled for 30 April to 2 May, was postponed until Electric Picnic 2010 after several of the acts who intended to be there were distracted by the announcement of 2010 United Kingdom general election for 6 May.
- On 17 April, 18 and 20 April April: Whitney Houston played three dates at the O_{2}, Dublin, as part of her first tour for at least eleven years.
- On 20 April, Duckworth Lewis Method's Neil Hannon and Thomas Walsh were nominated for an Ivor Novello Award for their debut album.

=== May ===
- On 7 May, Kiss played a date in Dublin, taking place at the O_{2}, as part of their Sonic Boom Over Europe Tour.
- On 11 May and 12 May, Metallica played their first shows in Belfast for more than two decades, taking place at the Odyssey.
- 20 May – Ivor Novello Awards at Grosvenor House Hotel, London: Duckworth Lewis Method's Neil Hannon and Thomas Walsh were defeated by Paolo Nutini in their category.

=== June ===
- On 2 June, a statue of Rory Gallagher was unveiled in his birthplace of Ballyshannon, County Donegal.
- On 3 June, the line-up for Arthur's Day 2010 was announced, including Snow Patrol, Paolo Nutini, José González, and The View.
- On 5 June, Snow Patrol played Ward Park in Bangor, County Down, supported by Lisa Hannigan, Band of Horses and General Fiasco. The concert was broadcast on BBC Northern Ireland at a later date.
- On 5 June, Westlife played Croke Park, Dublin, with JLS for support. John & Edward were later announced as another support act.
- On 8 June, Rage Against the Machine played The O2 in Dublin, with support from Gallows.
- On 9 June, The Cranberries played at Thomond Park in their first performance in their native city for more than 15 years.
- On 14 June, the complete day and stage breakdown of Oxegen 2010 was announced.
- On 23 June, Green Day played Marlay Park in Dublin.
- Glastonbury Festival 2010:
  - On 25 June, U2 were scheduled to headline Glastonbury Festival 2010, their first festival performance for more than a quarter of a century.
  - On 25 May 2010, it was announced that U2 had cancelled their appearance at the festival to allow Bono's recovery from recent back surgery, with Bono issuing a special message of his heartbreak to the fans – "I'm heartbroken" – and said "we even wrote a song especially for the festival". The following day it was announced that Gorillaz would fill in for U2.
  - Other Irish acts appearing at the festival included Two Door Cinema Club (24 June), Brian Kennedy, Julie Feeney and The Big Pink (also on 25 June), Christy Moore (26 June) and Ash, Rodrigo y Gabriela, Fionn Regan and Imelda May (27 June).
  - Cavan quintet Shouting at Planes beat more than 100 other acts to win a competition to play at the festival.
  - Muse were joined on stage by The Edge to perform "Where the Streets Have No Name".
- On 30 June, Sentinel Records closed after ten years.

=== July ===
- Oxegen 2010 took place from 9–11 July 2010 at Punchestown Racecourse, County Kildare.
- On 15 July, music promoter, manager and entrepreneur Derek Nally died after undergoing a myocardial infarction. His funeral on 19 July was a crowded affair.
- On 17 July, Ryan Sheridan played Festival Internacional de Benicàssim in Spain.
- On 20 July, Villagers were shortlisted for the 2010 Mercury Prize for the album Becoming a Jackal.
- On 23 July Frantic Jack released their debut album 'Independence' and third single Hold On which peaked at No.9 in the Irish charts a week later
- On 30 July, Westlife played Lissadell House in County Sligo, their home county, and Iron Maiden played The O2, Dublin.
- On 31 July, Leonard Cohen played Lissadell House in County Sligo.

=== August ===
- In August, Slane Concert 2010 was to occur and was expected to involve an "international artist". It was later announced that there would be no 2010 concert in Slane.
- On 11 August, Liberty Kings guitarist Eoghan Mac Aoidh was killed in a traffic collision in Leicestershire, England, UK.
- On 19 August, a man committed suicide during a concert by The Swell Season in the U.S. state of California.
- On 27 and 29 August, The Mighty Stef performed at the Reading and Leeds Festivals.

=== September ===
- On 1 September, Guns N' Roses performed at The O2, Dublin as part of their Chinese Democracy World Tour. Axl Rose was bottled off the stage. The band also played the Odyssey Arena, Belfast the night before, the first time that Guns N' Roses played indoor shows in Ireland.
- On 3, 4 & 5 September, the Electric Picnic 2010 took place in Stradbally, County Laois.
- On 7 September, the winner of the 2010 Mercury Prize was announced, with Villagers shortlisted.
- On 23 September, Arthur's Day 2010 occurred in Cork, Dublin and Galway.
- On 24 & 25 September, Michael Bublé 'performed at the Aviva Stadium, Dublin.

=== October ===
- On 2 & 3 October, The Music Show occurred at the RDS, Dublin.
- On 29 October, it was announced that Kings of Leon would headline Slane Concert in 2011, the 30th anniversary event. All 80,000 tickets sold out in 40 minutes when they went on sale one week later.

=== November ===
- On 24 November, the IMTV Awards took place at The Academy in Dublin.
- On 5 November, the BBC, the UK's public service broadcaster, issued an apology to Bob Geldof and the Band Aid Trust, after falsely claiming that money raised for Ethiopia was used to buy weapons instead.

=== December ===
- In December, Oxegen 2011 was launched, with headline acts Arctic Monkeys, blink-182 and Foo Fighters.
- On 10 December, The Coronas played a headlining show at the Olympia Theatre, Dublin.
- On 11 December, Kings of Leon played at The O_{2} to keep up with demand after their 2011 Slane Concert headliner sold out in 40 minutes.
- From 27 December until 2 January, The Saw Doctors performed on a national Christmas tour of Ireland.

== Bands disbanded ==
- Alphastates (18 February)
- The Upgrades (26 March)
- John Moore leaves HamsandwicH (12 April)
- Glyder (October)

== Bands reformed ==
- The Hitchers (February)
- Thin Lizzy

== Albums & EPs ==
Below is a list of notable albums & EPs released by Irish artists in Ireland in 2010.

Issue date	Album title	Artist	Source	Sales	Notes
Early 2010	Mother Courage and Her Children	Duke Special			
30 January	Sounds of System Breakdown	Sounds of System Breakdown			Launched on Saturday, 30 January 2010 in The Village on Wexford Street, Dublin.
4 February	Caterpillar Sarabande	Vyvienne Long			
13 February	Strobelight and Torture	Paranoid Visions			In memory of the victims of the 1981 Stardust fire, available as a three-track 7" and six-track CD.
19 February	The Post War Musical	Pilotlight			Produced by Dave Odlum after recording in France.
26 February	Kingdom of Ghosts	Humanzi			Recorded in Berlin.
__ March	Desecrations	The Holy Roman Army			Five-track covers EP.
__ March	Artificial Horizon	U2			Remix album available to subscribers of U2.com.
8 March	Brother	Boyzone			Fourth studio album, first since the death of Stephen Gately
5 March	Dinosaur	John Shelly & The Creatures			Debut studio album
5 March	Works for Solo Flute	William Dowdall			Debut solo album from the RTÉ National Symphony Orchestra performer. Officially launched at the Royal Irish Academy of Music at 18:00 on this date, available from Tower Records, iTunes, Amazon.com.
12 March	Before We Say Goodbye	Donnacha Costello			Recorded entirely with analogue equipment, released through Poker Flat.
12 March	Stop Screaming Start Dreaming	The Dirty 9s			Recorded in Nutshed Studio in Clara, County Offaly, produced by Greg Haver, released through Sci-Fi Girl Records, featuring the single "Corridors".
12 March	Identity Parade	Identity Parade			Debut album.
12 March	Hooba Dooba	Paul Brady			14th solo album, on PeeBee Music through Proper Records UK
26 March	We Albatri	Oliver Cole			Debut solo album.
26 March	Forever in Disguise	Daniel Jones			Self-released debut album
26 March	Friendship	The Redneck Manifesto			First album for six years, ten tracks, released on Dublin indie label, the Richter Collective and available on CD Digipak, gatefold vinyl and MP3 download.
1 April	Lost Trails	Butterfly Explosion			Debut album released to record stores on this date after previously being available on iTunes.
2 April	Alonewalk	Dave Couse			Third solo album. Released on Good Friday (2 April) to coincide with song on album (called "Good Friday", and featuring Cathal Coughlan). Available from 1969 Records, in stores, and on iTunes.
9 April	Gentleman's Club	The Dead Flags			Debut album, includes lead single "Let's Start a Fire Tonight".
Spring 2010	TBA	Ham Sandwich			
Summer 2010	TBA	The Saw Doctors			7th studio album, songs previewed at live shows include "Friday Town", "Goodbye Again", "Someone Loves You", "Indian Summer" and "Glorious Days of Summer".
Late Spring 2010	You Say, We Say	Royseven			
__ April 2010	TBA	Miracle Bell			
17 April 2010	___ (EP)	Nighthawks			Five-track EP released in aid of Oxfam Ireland and launched in the Parliament Street OXFAM shop on this date.
23 April	The Dogs Are Parading	David Holmes			29-track, 2-disc hits and rarities compilation.
23 April	Fable	Roesy			Fourth album, mainly recorded in New York.
__ May	From Stage to Stage	Dervish			Live album and DVD released 21 years since the band started.
7 May	The Nameless	Cathy Davey			
14 May	Becoming a Jackal	Villagers			Debut album released on Domino Records and given a 7" release on 17 April and digital download on 26 April. US release date: 8 June 2010.
21 May	The Universe Is Laughing	The Guggenheim Grotto			Available on the duo's website.
29 May	A National Light	The Rags			Debut album released by the band.
__ June	Of the People	Sean Millar			
7 June	U2 360° at the Rose Bowl	U2			Concert film directed by Tom Krueger, available in standard and 2-disc deluxe DVD and Blu-ray formats.
11 June	Be It Right Or Wrong	R.S.A.G.			His second album.
Autumn 2010	TBA	Gemma Hayes			
August 2010	This Is the Second Album of a Band Called Adebisi Shank	Adebisi Shank			The second album by the band.
August 2010	Sleepless Street	Peter Doran			Second album by the Mullingar indie-folk songwriter.
August 2010	The Powerscourt Tapes (EP)	Hamlet Sweeney			Debut EP.
20 August	The Juliana Field	Rob Smith			
17 September	?	Babybeef			
17 September	I'd Rather Go Blonde	Eleanor McEvoy			Her eighth studio album.
4 October	Marcata	The Minutes			
2010	Meant to be Machines	Cowboy X			
27 August	The Body of Christ and the Legs of Tina Turner	Fight Like Apes			
10 September	Science & Faith	The Script			
__ October 2010	Urban Soundscapes	Gerry Cott			
__ October 2010	Bounce at the Devil	Republic of Loose			
5 November 2010	Collaborations	Sharon Shannon			
3 December 2010	1989 The Best of Power of Dreams	Power of Dreams			
2010	TBA	Heritage Centre			
2010	Rise of the Reptile King	Lluther			Film and album, from which from January until September a single was scheduled to be released on the 10th and 20th of each month.
2010	Stop the Lights	The Walls			

== Singles ==
Below is a list of notable singles released by Irish artists in Ireland in 2010.

Issue date	Single title	Artist	Source	Sales	Notes
__ January	"Far from Here"	The Coronas			
4 January	"Austin Cusack"	The Hitchers			The band's first single release in almost a decade.
__ January	"In the Dollhouse"	Lluther			First in a series of single releases from the album and film Rise of the Reptile King to occur on the 10th and 20th of each month until September.
10 February	"King of Nothing"	Lluther			
__ February	"Carnivore/Leave the Lights On"	Sanskrit			Double A-side single taken from the album After the Wedding.
5 February	"Comets"	Super Extra Bonus Party			Also features Heathers.
25 February	"When You Go"	Identity Parade			Download only.
1 March	"Gave It All Away"	Boyzone			First single release since the death of Stephen Gately.
5 March	"Black Room"	The Chapters			Digital download release on 5 March.
6 March	"Tonight Is the Night"	Eugene Donegan			Released at the Spirit Store in Dundalk on 6 March; from Donegan's debut album Little Apples (2009).
8 March	"I Put a Spell on You"	Shane MacGowan/Victoria Mary Clarke			Video. Download only. Featuring Nick Cave, Bobby Gillespie, Glen Matlock, Chrissie Hynde, Mick Jones and Johnny Depp. Proceeds going to Concern Worldwide's aid effort for the 2010 Haiti earthquake. Premiered on The Last Word with Matt Cooper on 24 February 2010.
26 March	"Faces"	Jester			
March/April	"'Us and the U.S."	Aoife Cleary			Debut solo single from The Blonde Majority's former singer.
April	"Wonderful Way"	Joe Echo			
17 April	"Becoming a Jackal"	Villagers			Digital download version scheduled for release on 26 April 2010.
23 April	"The Parson"	The Frank and Walters			The first in a series of four singles.
__ May	"The Roamer"	R.S.A.G.			First single taken from his second album, Be It Right Or Wrong.
7 May	"Don’t Panic"/"Real Friends"	Talulah Does The Hula			Double A-side limited-edition, hand numbered CD single.
14 May	"The Naturist"	Ham Sandwich			Second single released from forthcoming second album.
28 May	"Destroy"	The Japanese Popstars			First single taken from second album and first after joining EMI/Virgin Records.
28 May	"Something to Prove"	The Skin We're In			Debut single taken from eponymously titled EP and released independently on digital format.
4 June	"Something's Got to Give/Suicide Bomber"	El Hombre Jokes			Debut double A-Side single by the quartet.
18 June	"Up All Night"	We Should Be Dead			
23 July	"Behind Closed Doors"	Storyfold			
13 August	"Wake Up"	El Hombre Jokes			
20 August	"Hoo Ha Henry"	Fight Like Apes			Download single; the band's first from their second album.
23 August	"Hospice"	Shouting at Planes			Available on iTunes and downloadmusic.ie
22 October	"Punchbag"	Ladydoll			
22 October	"Breathe In"	We Should Be Dead			
12 November	"Mazy Haze"	Empire Saints			

== Festivals ==
=== Oxegen 2010 ===
- Oxegen 2010 took place from 9–11 July.

=== Electric Picnic 2010 ===
- Electric Picnic 2010 took place from 3–5 September.

=== Slane 2010 ===
- Green Day's Billie Joe Armstrong has spoken of his admiration for U2's shows at Slane and, in relation to his band performing there in 2010, has commented: "It's something that's being looked at". However, this longstanding and recurring rumour was dismissed when the band opted to play Marlay Park instead.

== Music awards ==
=== 2010 Meteor Awards ===
The 2010 Meteor Awards took place at the RDS in Dublin on 19 February 2010. Below are the winners:

Award	Winner(s)
Best Irish Male	Christy Moore
Best Irish Female	Wallis Bird
Best Irish Band	Snow Patrol
Best Irish Album	Tony Was an Ex-Con
Best Irish Pop Act	Westlife
Best Irish Live Performance	The Script
Best National DJ	Ray Foley
Best Regional DJ	Leigh Doyle
Most Promising New Artist of the Year	Amasis
Best International Male	Michael Bublé
Best International Female	Lady Gaga
Best International Band	Florence and the Machine
Best International Album	Sunny Side Up
Best Live International Performance	
Industry Award	Lord Henry Mount Charles
Humanitarian Award	Niall Mellon
Lifetime Achievement Award	Brian Kennedy

=== Choice Music Prize ===
The Choice Music Prize for Irish Album of the Year 2009 took place at Vicar Street on 3 March 2010.

=== IMTV Awards ===
2010 marked the second year of the Irish Music Television Awards, recognising Irish video makers, directors and artists involved in producing music videos. The awards ceremony took place at The Academy in Dublin on 24 November 2010.
