= Gerry Owens =

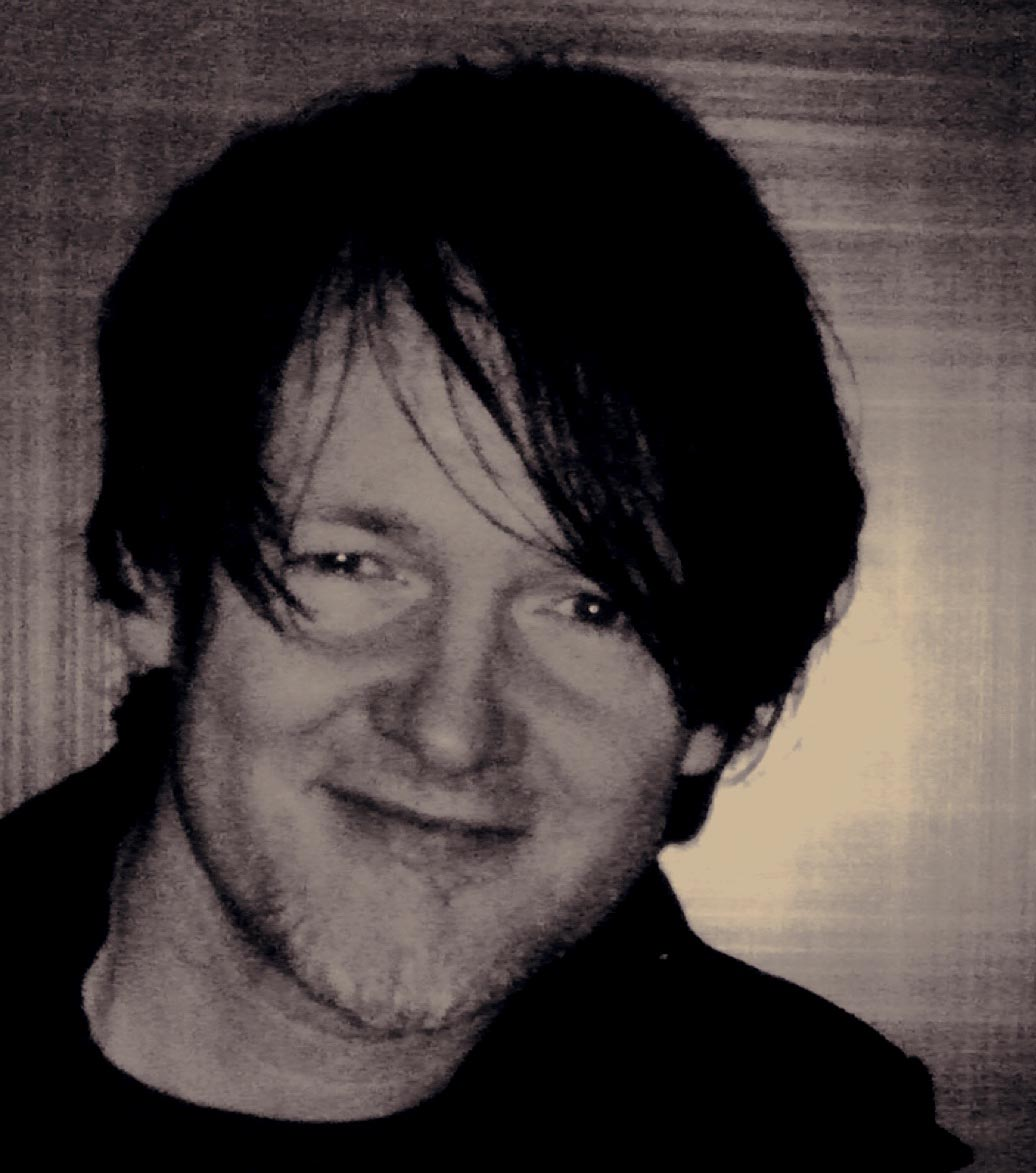
- Owens in Dublin, 2012

Background information
- Origin: Dublin, Ireland
- Genres: Rock; industrial
- Occupations: Musician, composer, producer
- Instruments: Vocals, Guitar, Synthesizers
- Years active: 2000-present
- Label: Black Bag Music

Gerry Owens is the vocalist, songwriter, arranger, and producer of Irish industrial rock band Lluther.

Owens was born in Dublin, Ireland. His father was a musician. After spending some time in London and playing in a series of bands, he returned to Dublin to form Skindive, who were quickly signed by Chris Blackwell (founder of Island Records) to his Palm Pictures label. Owens wrote, arranged, recorded and co-produced the Skindive album, from which the music was featured on the Grammy Awards 2002, MTV Movie Awards 2002 and MTV Road Rules.

He signed a worldwide publishing deal with SonyATV Music Publishing in 2006 with his new Industrial Rock project Lluther producing two albums; Agents of Empire in 2006 and Rise Of The Reptile Kind in 2011. In 2012 Owens produced movie trailer music for Sonic Symphony in Los Angeles. His music has been used theatrical trailers including those for Thor Dark World, The Edge of Tomorrow, San Andreas, Tomorrowland, and The Lone Ranger.

He has produced and co-written two albums for Moth Complex as well as composing soundtrack music.

He has worked with Dave 'Rave' Ogilvie, Alan Branch, Danny Saber, Adrian Sherwood and Scott Humphries.
