= Choose Your Battles =

Choose Your Battles may refer to:

- "Choose Your Battles", an episode of Teen Mom 2
- "Choose Your Battles", an episode of The L.A. Complex
- Choose Your Battles, a 2011 EP by Jody Has A Hitlist
- "Choose Your Battles" (Katy Perry song), a song on the 2013 album Prism
