= Live in New York & Dublin =

EP by Rob Smith
- Released: 9 June 2011
- Genre: Acoustic, rock
- Length: 18.03
- Label: Cocklebob Recordings
- Producer: Various

Rob Smith chronology
The Juliana Field (2010)	Live in New York & Dublin (2011)

Live in New York & Dublin is a live EP released by the Irish musician Rob Smith on 9 June 2011. It features acoustic live performances in various venues in both New York City, United States and Dublin, Ireland.

== Track listing ==
1. "Stand Up"
2. "Elephant Stone"
3. "Laugh All the Way to Town"
4. "So Many So Near"
5. "Rue Sainte-Dominique"
6. "Out in the Sunshine"
7. "(People) Come with Me"
