= Palm World Voices: Mandela =

DVD Box set featuring Nelson Mandela

Palm World Voices: Mandela is a DVD Box set featuring Nelson Mandela. It includes Mandela: Son of Africa, Father of a Nation DVD, as well as the Mandela Original Soundtrack CD: The Essential Music of South Africa and a 48-page book with art images, photos and an essay by British journalist Robin Denselow.

Mandela: Son of Africa, Father of a Nation is a full-length documentary about Nelson Mandela, following him from his early days and education to his election as South Africa's first black president. It was nominated for 1997 Academy Awards for Best Documentary.

Mandela Original Soundtrack CD: The Essential Music of South Africa includes tracks by Jennifer Jones and Hugh Masekela, The African Jazz Pioneers, The Havana Swingsters, The Skylarks, The Father Huddleston Band, The Manhattan Brothers, the Jazz Dazzlers, The African National Congress Choir, Johnny Clegg and Savuka, The Specials, Vusi Mahlasela, Kalahari Surfers, Babsy Mlangeni, Bayete and Jabu Khanyile, Brenda Fassie and more.

== See also ==
- Palm Pictures
