= Blowtorch Records =

Irish independent record label

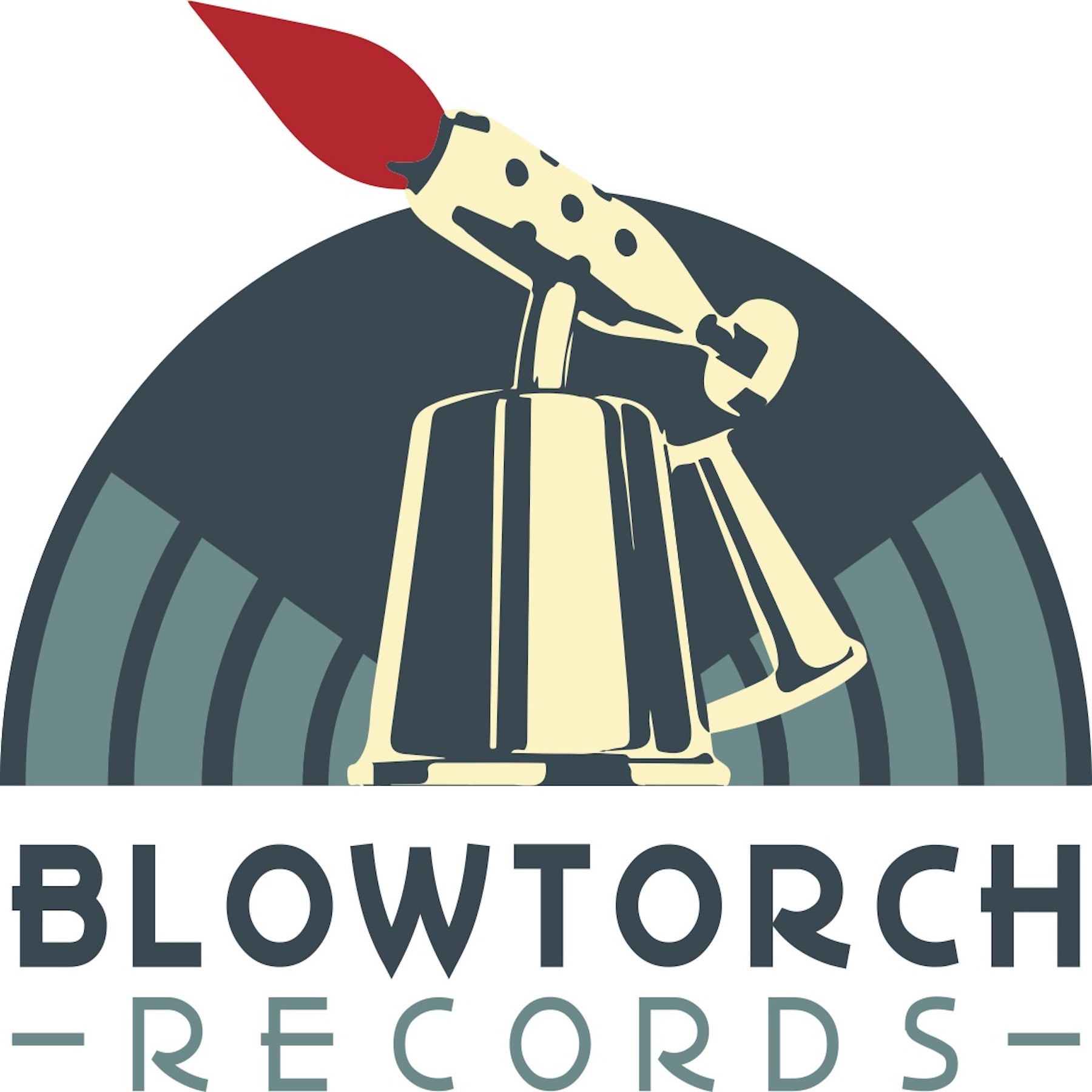
- Founded: 2019
- Genre: Post punk, punk, shoegaze, and electronica
- Country of origin: Ireland
- Official website: https://www.blowtorchrecords.com/

Blowtorch Records is an independent record label founded in Galway, Ireland in 2019. Associated primarily with Ireland's punk, post-punk, shoegaze, alt rock and electronica scenes, the label has released music by artists including Adore, Rob Smith's Swedish Railway Orchestra, Search Results, The Savage Hearts (led by Evan Walsh from The Strypes), and Paranoid Visions.

== History ==
=== Beginnings ===
Setup by Richard Blowes (also known by his married name Burke) at the start of 2019 in Galway, Ireland, within six months, he took on the role of manager for the Galway punk band Turnstiles. The band's debut EP was the first physical release for the label and was released on both vinyl and CD.

=== 2022–2024 ===
The label's roster and catalogue expanded during this period with more Irish acts such as Nixer, TV People, and Search Results joined the label, each releasing music on vinyl and CD.

=== 2025–present ===
As the label continued to develop with vinyl releases from Irish bands such as Pebbledash, Slyrydes and Nerves, in May 2025, the label put on its own West x Sound West festival: a showcase of artists associated with the label, at The Róisín Dubh in Galway.

The event featured eight Blowtorch Records acts across two stages, including Adore, Virgins, The Savage Hearts, The Swedish Railway Orchestra and Nerves. The label produced a vinyl compilation record featuring one track from each participating band. The showcase received coverage from The Irish Times, The Connacht Tribune and UK music publication God Is In The TV.

The showcase coincided with a period in which several bands associated with Blowtorch started to receive wider attention. Adore announced on the day of West x Sound West that they were signing with British independent label Big Scary Monsters. In February 2026 The Savage Hearts signed to London-based label Blaggers Records. Blowtorch Records continued to release music by Irish alternative artists during 2025 and 2026 while maintaining its focus on physical editions.

== Selected releases ==
Year	Album name	Artist
2021	Nothing More	TV People (EP)
2022	People Feel	Nixer (EP)
2022	Dance To the Drum Machine	The Swedish Railway Orchestra (LP)
2024	Collected Works 2019-2022	Turnstiles (LP)
2024	Glórach	Nerves (EP)
2025	What Happens If You Get Happy?	Slyrydes (LP)
2025	To Cast The Sea In Concrete	Pebbledash (EP)
2025	Radio Silence	The Savage Hearts (EP)
2025	Mirrorism	In Athens (EP)
2025	Feel Low	Some Remain (EP)
2026	SexyTadhg	SlutTrad (EP)

== Associated artists ==
- Adore
- In Athens
- Nerves
- Pebbledash
- The Savage Hearts
- Slyrydes
- Some Remain
- The Swedish Railway Orchestra
- TV People
- Turnstiles
- Virgins
