= Throwing It All Away (album) =

Studio album by Rob Smith
- Released: 15 March 2008
- Recorded: Southfields, Rosslare, Co Wexford & Dublin.
- Genre: Rock
- Length: 39:54
- Label: Cocklebob Recordings
- Producer: Colin Whelan, Conor O'Brien & Rob Smith

Rob Smith chronology
Throwing It All Away (2008)	The Juliana Field (2010)

Throwing It All Away is the debut album by Irish musician Rob Smith. It was released on 15 March 2008.

== Track listing ==
1. "Intro : The Jam"
2. "One for the Modern"
3. "Out in the Sunshine"
4. "Stand Up"
5. "Soul Shaker"
6. "Interlude: La Mano de Dios"
7. "(People) Come with Me"
8. "So Many, So Near"
9. "Laugh All the Way to Town"
10. "When Your Feet Were Dancing"
11. "Piano Tune"
12. "Lasagne" - hidden track
