= Adrian Crowley =

Irish singer-songwriter

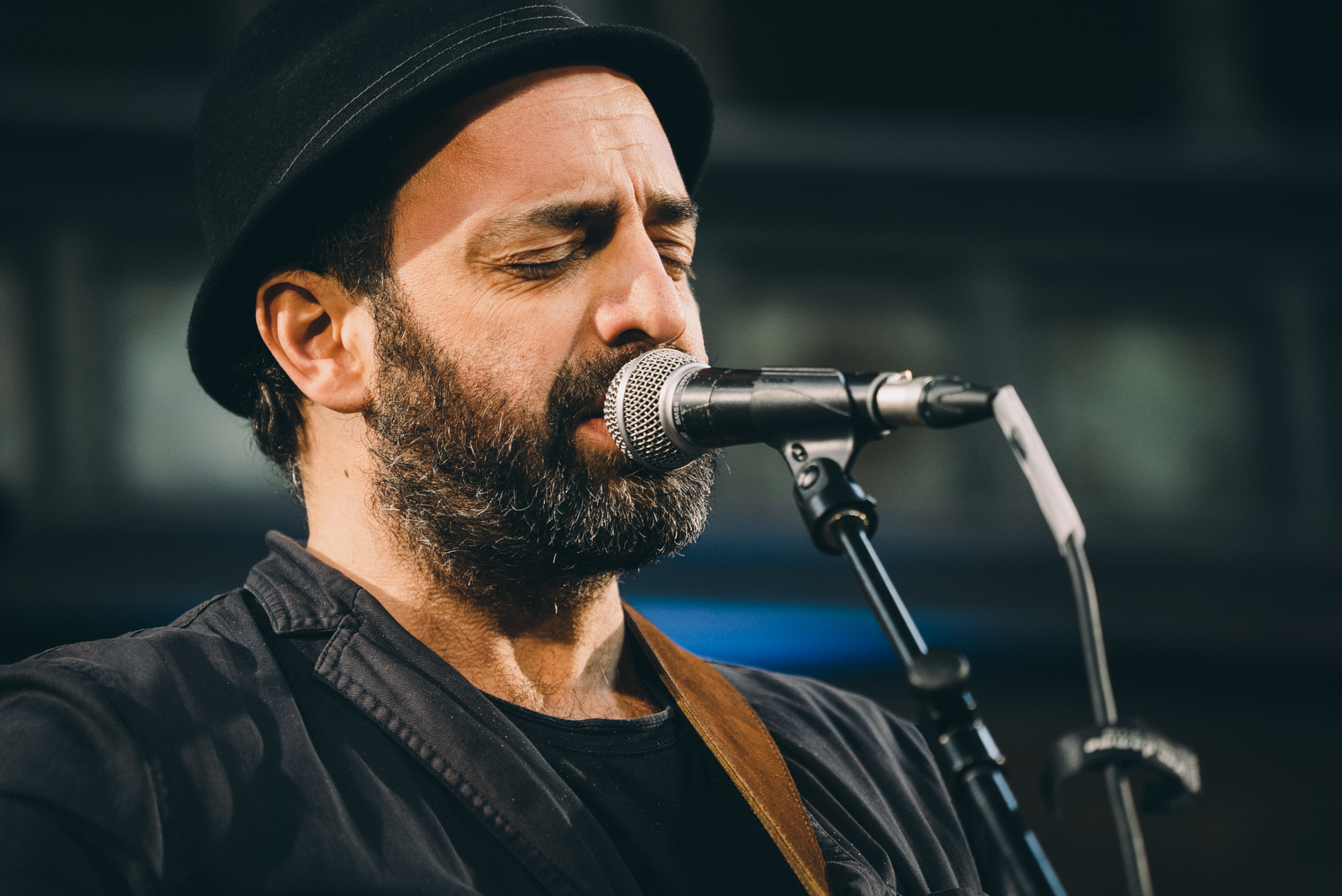
- Adrian Crowley, March 2017

Background information
- Born: 1968 (age 57–58); Malta
- Origin: Ireland
- Genres: Folk, indie rock
- Occupations: Musician, songwriter
- Instruments: Voice, electric guitar, marxophone, mellotron, Rhodes piano, Shruti box, piano, acoustic guitar, bells
- Years active: 1999–present
- Labels: Chemikal Underground, Domino Publishing
- Website: adriancrowley.com

Adrian Crowley is a singer, composer, songwriter, lyricist from Galway, based in Dublin and born in Sliema, Malta.

Crowley has released eight albums to date, with his debut A Strange Kind arriving in 1999. He followed this with When You Are Here You Are Family (2002), A Northern Country (2004), Long Distance Swimmer (2007), Season of the Sparks (2009) and "I See Three Birds Flying" (2012) In a 2005 Rolling Stone interview, Ryan Adams cited Crowley when asked "Who's the best songwriter that no one's heard of". The Irish Times placed this artist at number eight in a list of "The 50 Best Irish Acts Right Now" published in April 2009.

Crowley has won the Choice Music Prize for Irish Album of the Year on one occasion for Season of the Sparks and been nominated on two another occasion for Long Distance Swimmer and "I See Tree Birds Flying".

== Early life ==
Crowley is from a multicultural background, (his father is Irish and mother is Maltese) He was born in Sliema in Malta but reared in Galway. Crowley's parents met in Africa and the family spent time in Sierra Leone, Cameroon and Malta. After his birth his family departed Malta for Cameroon. Crowley has been based in Dublin since the 1990s but has also spent time living in France.

== Career ==
Before his life as a musician, Crowley originally spent time on other pursuits, such as studying architecture, illustration, painting and photography.

Crowley released his debut album A Strange Kind independently in 1999. The song "Capricorn" was played regularly on No Disco that year. When You Are Here You Are Family followed in 2002, being recorded at the Electrical Audio studios of one of his heroes, Steve Albini, in Chicago. This successful spell in the United States inspired him to begin communicating with American record labels.

He joined the label Ba Da Bing who were keen to produce his next two albums. A Northern Country was due for release in on 2 July 2004, though was delayed before appearing on a smaller label with little publicity. Crowley later referred to A Northern Country as "the least ceremonious album of them all".

Long Distance Swimmer was released as soon as it was recorded as, according to Crowley, he became "fed up waiting". It was recorded with engineer Stephen Shannon. The record received positive reviews and was nominated for the Choice Music Prize. The NME said it was "a lo-furnished, snug, auburn-tinged folk album which calls to mind Bill Callahan, Johnny Cash, and Edwyn Collins". The Irish Independent's John Meagher named it his favourite album of 2007 and sixteenth best Irish album of the decade, while his colleague Eamon Sweeney suggested Crowley's record was one of the few Irish albums preventing that year from being "an absolute stinker". It was around this time that Crowley began working with The Fence Collective and members of Halfset. He featured on the edition of 12 March 2008 of the sixth series of Other Voices. Also that month, he performed a residency at Whelan's.

Season of the Sparks was released on 24 April 2009 and featured an expanded palette of instruments including marxophone, shruti box, upright harmonium, viola de gamba, baroque viola. It was generally well received by critics in both and Ireland and the UK, and, so pleased was the reviewer with the French magazine Les Inrockuptibles that he wrote a letter of thanks to Crowley. He was also one of the first acts to be announced for Electric Picnic 2010.

Adrian Crowley's eighth album, Dark Eyed Messenger, was recorded in New York and was produced by and features Thomas Bartlett who has also worked with Sufjan Stevens, Anna Calvi, Sam Amidon and Laurie Anderson.

== Other work ==
James Yorkston and Dubliner Adrian Crowley opened with a special performance of the songs of American lo-fi legend Daniel Johnston, an artist whose battle with mental health demons has been well documented. They gave his tunes delicate and sparse arrangements, even singing some a cappella. The pair have recorded an eight track mini-album as a tribute to Daniel Johnston. Crowley also curates the Homelights Festival in Dublin.

He is also interested in film and has composed a number of scores. He is responsible for scoring the Irish feature film, Where The Sea Used To Be (2012), directed by Paul Farren. His song, 'The Wishing Seat' prominently features in the award-winning feature film, Love Eternal (2014), directed by Brendan Muldowney and stars Pollyanna Mackintosh and Robert de Hoog.

Adrian Crowley appears in a feature-length alternative documentary entitled The Science of Ghosts (2018), directed by Niall McCann, which premiered at Dublin International Film Festival at the IFI, 26 February 2018. The plot involves Crowley being interrupted during an interview, causing Adrian to ponder what would a film about his life be like? would it reflect who he is? His imagination takes us on a journey, as a ghost, visiting his own life, past and future.

== Style ==
Crowley's style has been compared to that of Bill Callahan, Nick Drake and Tim Buckley, while Irish Independent reviewer Eamon Sweeney has said the singer is "a master of understatement". The vocals of Noah and the Whale's Charlie Fink are said to be reminiscent of Crowley's. As well as singing Crowley plays the electric guitar and the Rhodes piano; he never plays the acoustic guitar. He experiences music while he sleeps:

Since I started doing music full time, I actually hear it in my sleep and sometimes wake up and wonder who left the stereo on – and it's really in my head. It's unbelievable. I think it's a kind of natural aural hallucination. I'll hear it as I'm waking – it might wake me. I'll be dreaming music but then it might take me out of my dream. Once I'm wide awake it's gone.

== Discography ==
Adrian Crowley has released nine albums.

- A Strange Kind (1999)
- When You Are Here You Are Family (2002)
- A Northern Country (2004)
- Long Distance Swimmer (2007)
- Season of the Sparks (2009)
- I See Three Birds Flying (2012)
- Some Blue Morning (2014)
- Dark Eyed Messenger (2017)
- The Watchful Eye of the Stars (2021)
- Measure of Joy (2025)

== Band members ==
The following have performed with Crowley.

- Mary Barnecutt -Cello
- Katie Kim – vocals
- Jeff Martin – Guitar
- Steven Shannon – Bass guitar
- Cillian Mc Donnell – Drums
- Kevin Murphy – Cello
- Marja Tuhkanen Gaynor – Viola, violin, viola de gamba, viol
- Adem Ilhan – Harmonium, vocals, percussion
- Kate Ellis – Cello
- Thomas Haugh – Drums, zither
- Andrew Bushe – Drums
- Sarah Fox – Bass guitar, double bass, vocals
- Emma Smith – Violin, vocals
- Vince Sipprell – Viola
- Cameron Miller – Bass guitar, double bass, vocals
- Sarah Jones – Drums
- Christopher Mayo – Bass guitar
- James Yorkston – Concertina, guitar, vocals
- Alex Neilson – Drums
- Otto Hauser – Drums
- Jesse Sparhawk – Bass guitar
- Viking Moses
- Dave Hingerty – drums
- Bill Blackmore – flugelhorn, trumpet

== Awards ==
The Irish Times placed Crowley at number eight in a list of "The 50 Best Irish Acts Right Now" published in April 2009, noting his "majestic songs, rich voice and subtle blend of atmospherics and master-level wordplay".

In a 2005 Rolling Stone interview, Ryan Adams cited Crowley when asked "Who's the best songwriter that no one's heard of".

=== Choice Music Prize ===
Long Distance Swimmer was nominated for the Choice Music Prize for Irish Album of the Year 2007 but lost to Super Extra Bonus Party's Super Extra Bonus Party LP.

Season of the Sparks won the Choice Music Prize for Irish Album of the Year 2009. Crowley received a prize of €10,000 cheque. He described himself as "totally flabbergasted", adding "I didn't really think it was the sort of record that was going to win awards". Crowley promised to use the money to fund his music. He was one of eight nominees who performed at the awards ceremony. He is a friend of fellow nominee Valerie Francis.

Year	Nominee / work	Award	Result
2008	Long Distance Swimmer	Irish Album of the Year 2007	Nominated
2010	Season of the Sparks	Irish Album of the Year 2009	Won
2013	"I See Three Birds Flying"	Irish album of the year 2012	Nominated
