= Electric Picnic 2009 =

- Genre: Indie
- Dates: 4–6 September 2009
- Locations: Stradbally Hall, Stradbally, County Laois, Ireland
- Website: www.electricpicnic.ie

Electric Picnic 2009 was the sixth edition of the Electric Picnic festival to take place. The three-day event took place on the weekend of Friday 4 September, Saturday 5 September and Sunday 6 September at Stradbally Hall in Stradbally, County Laois, Ireland. The festival was launched on 15 April 2009 and featured performances from artists such as Orbital, The Flaming Lips, Brian Wilson, Basement Jaxx, Madness, Klaxons, Bell X1, Fleet Foxes and MGMT.

Orbital and The Flaming Lips released albums prior to their appearances. Dan Deacon was replaced in the line-up by The Jimmy Cake the week before.

== Build-up ==
=== Takeover ===
Prior to 2009, the festival was jointly organised between Pod Concerts and Aiken Promotions. The British promoter Festival Republic bought out the share of Aiken Promotions in Electric Picnic in March 2009, joining in a partnership with Pod Concerts to organise the 2009 event. Festival Republic is itself 50.1% owned by Live Nation who are the biggest concert and festival promoter in the world so this move is now seen by many as a positive move for the festival.

=== Tickets ===
On Friday 10 October 2008, a limited number of ‘Early Bird’ tickets went on sale at the 2008 price of €199, which includes camping. The early bird tickets sold out in days. Tickets for the festival then went on sale on 17 April 2009 at 09:00. The Family Ticket, which was introduced for Electric Picnic 2008, returned, allowing two adults and as many as four children to live in the Family Campsite for the weekend. The festival was declared a sell-out by promoter John Reynolds.

=== Launch ===
Electric Picnic 2009 was launched on 15 April 2009 in Harcourt Street with Alice in Wonderland and Bell X1. The initial announcement included forty-seven acts. Artist booker Declan Forde stated that shower and lavatory conditions will be a top priority for the 2009 festival. Amongst the first acts announced were Orbital, The Flaming Lips, Basement Jaxx, Madness, Klaxons, Bell X1, Fleet Foxes and MGMT. Bell X1 and Rodrigo y Gabriela made their Electric Picnic debuts, whilst Chic made their first ever Irish appearance at the festival. Also appearing were Seasick Steve, 2 Many DJs, Jape, Lisa Hannigan, Damien Dempsey, Alabama 3, Bat for Lashes, Imelda May, Echo & the Bunnymen, Magazine, Halfset and Villagers. The Low Anthem played on 4 September The Irish Independent described the mix of acts unveiled at the launch as consisting of "reformed supergroups, cult indie acts, and a couple of hot young things". More acts were announced at a later date.

=== Other additions ===
Brian Wilson, Röyksopp, Amadou & Mariam, The Wailers, Fionn Regan, Mundy, James Murphy and Pat Mahoney of LCD Soundsystem, A Flock of Seagulls, Bell Orchestre, The Field, Jeffrey Lewis, Marina and the Diamonds and Richmond Fontaine were announced on 13 May 2009. The Big Pink were added on 29 May.

The Stradbally Laughs line-up was announced on 16 July 2009 and included Sean Hughes, Phil Nichol, Brendon Burns, Gavin Webster, Kevin Bridges, Joe Rooney, Eric Lalor, Andrew Stanley, Damien Clarke, Dead Cat Bounce and Steve Frost's Impro All-Stars featuring Andy Smart, Steve Steen, Richard Vrench and Ian Coppinger. Tommy Tiernan will headline the comedy tent.

More acts were added on 22 July 2009. These included Florence and the Machine, Baaba Maal, The Duckworth Lewis Method, Mick Flannery, The Big Pink, Nightmares on Wax Soundsystem, Laura Izibor, Two Door Cinema Club, Blitzen Trapper, Wave Machines, Peter Broderick, Cap Pas Cap and Stee Downes.

On 30 July, more acts were announced, including Beach House, Blindfold, The Soundcarriers, Amorphous Androgynous, Golden Animals, the Tulla Céilí Band and Lamb. Boy 8-Bit was also announced.

On 4 August, it was revealed that there would be a recycling tent which would feature a display of ancient technological equipment such as the Walkman.

On 13 August, it was revealed that The xx would be appearing at the festival.

On 18 August, the Poptopia! line-up was announced, featuring acts such as Dark Room Notes, Neosupervital and Miss Panti.

On 19 August, several more acts were announced. These included Passion Pit, Our Fold, David Kitt, David Geraghty, 8-Ball, The Hacker, Optomo DJs, Switch, Zombie Nation, Duke Dumont, Aeroplane DJs, Ebony Bones!, Arveene & Misk, The Japanese Popstars and Luciano.

== Event ==
=== Performances ===
Rodrigo y Gabriela returned from Mexico where they had gone after eight years of working in Dublin. They launched their album 11:11 on the Friday night.

=== Hot Press Chatroom ===
The first additions to the line-up for the fifth Hot Press Chatroom to occur at Electric Picnic were Bell X1, Damien Dempsey, ABC's Martin Fry, Dinosaur Jr., The Duckworth Lewis Method, Richmond Fontaine, The Sugarhill Gang and The Wailers.

The xx were confirmed on 1 September to participate in the signing session on the Saturday of Electric Picnic. Also added as the festival approached were Alabama 3 (Sunday) and Tommy Tiernan (Saturday), Zero 7 (Friday), Lykke Li (Friday), Billy Bragg and The Walkmen (both Saturday). Seasick Steve was announced for the Friday night as the full timetable was revealed on 3 September.

==== Antisemitism controversy ====
“Six million? I would have got 10 or 12 million out of that. No fucking problem! Fuck them. Two at a time, they would have gone. Hold hands, get in there! Leave us your teeth and your glasses”.

— Tommy Tiernan stirs controversy when asked if he has ever been accused of being antisemitic.

The controversial comedian Tommy Tiernan caused controversy with a series of jokes, which were later perceived as antisemitic, following an interview session with Hot Press's Olaf Tyaransen at the festival. One member of the audience posed the question:

Going by your Nazi joke and your odd Israeli joke, have you ever been accused of being antisemitic?

Tiernan responded:

Have I ever been accused of being anti-Semitic? I certainly have, yeah. In America, these two people waited for me after a show. I used to do this joke about… the Jews say they never killed Jesus, and the joke was, I would say the line, "Well, it wasn't the fucking Mexicans", was the joke, like. Yeah, Jewish people came up to me afterwards... Have you ever seen people whose eyes are so aflame with righteousness… The whites of their eyes are so pure and fucking white. They're just one-stream people, they're not people that have gaps for more than one train of thought. This one train of thought fucking purifies them. And these people were just that "the Israelis are a hounded people". And God, Olaf might have more to say about that than me, but... You know, whatever, I'm not here to hound anybody, but these people come up to me afterwards…"

The audience, however, appeared to enjoy the jokes and clapped and cheered as Tiernan referred to Jews as "fucking Christ-killing bastards" and said he would have "got 10 or 12 million" of them during the Holocaust.

Fine Gael's Jewish TD Alan Shatter said afterwards: "I would regard it as particularly sad that people found that sort of outburst in any way amusing". Hot Press editor Niall Stokes defended Tiernan, saying Tiernan was only "taking the piss". Tiernan, speaking through the Hot Press website in a statement later published in the magazine, said he was "quite bewildered" and "greatly upset by the thought that these comments have caused hurt to others as this was never my intention". Tyaransen himself defended the interview in his Evening Herald column, saying the remarks had been taken "out of context" and that nobody had reported Tiernan's other jokes about Taoiseach Brian Cowen—"The man should be sent to prison; we should adopt Chinese gulags"—or Ryan Tubridy's debut as host of The Late Late Show—"It's like discovering that Kermit the Frog is a serial killer". However, the controversy led to condemnation of the comedian in the Israeli media. A representative of Tiernan said to Tyaransen: "This quote is being touted around the world as something Tommy told you in an interview. But really it was a public performance".

Tiernan was later dropped from the Just for Laughs festival line-up in Canada as a result of the remarks.

=== Areas ===
Areas to return from previous years include the Body & Soul Arena, Comedy Tent, Spoken Word Area, Greencrafts area and the Hot Press Chatroom. The Body & Soul arena will be expanded in 2009. The Mindfield Arena was launched on 23 June 2009, with the Leviathan Political Cabaret, due to be MC'ed by David McWilliams, returning for a fourth year, the Mindfield All-Star News Quiz being hosted by Channel 4 News presenter Jon Snow, an appearance by Ryan Tubridy and The Word's house band The Aftermath. Olaf Tyaransen was also confirmed to be giving a reading on the Saturday at Spoken Word.

==== Arts Council Literary Stage ====
The Arts Council Literary Stage featured Julie Feeney, Mundy, Tommy Tiernan and Florence Welsh who each read works by writers who inspired them.

==== Transmission Panti ====
Transmission Panti was a live televised show which took place in the Thisispopbaby tent. It featured author Irvine Welsh, Richie Egan from Jape and Stradbally Hall's owner Thomas Cosby.

=== Crime ===
In the week leading up to Electric Picnic, gardaí seized over €100,000 of illegal drugs, €5,000 cash and three people following a raid in Boyle, County Roscommon. The drugs, comprising cannabis, cocaine and ecstasy, were thought to have been made ready for distribution at the festival.

Following the festival, gardaí sought assistance from the general public as to the whereabouts of a 19-year-old man from Tramore, County Waterford, who had last been seen in the Electric Picnic campsite. He was found alive five days later in a field.

== Returning acts ==
Several acts announced further Irish performances after Electric Picnic. These included Damien Dempsey, Julie Feeney, Mick Flannery, Richmond Fontaine, Mundy and The Wailers. And Basement Jaxx.

== Line-up ==
The day and stage breakdown was revealed on 26 August.

- Madness
- Orbital
- Flaming Lips
- Basement Jaxx
- The Vagabonds
- MGMT
- Brian Wilson
- Fleet Foxes
- Klaxons
- Bell X1
- Mundy
- Fionn Regan
- Rodrigo y Gabriela
- Chic
- Seasick Steve
- 2 Many DJs
- Lisa Hannigan
- Explosions in the Sky
- Damien Dempsey
- Alabama 3
- Bat for Lashes
- Zero 7
- Erol Alkan
- Roots Manuva
- The Sugarhill Gang
- Billy Bragg
- Lykke Li
- Imelda May
- Echo & the Bunnymen
- Magazine
- ESG
- Moderat(Modeselektor+Apparat)
- Simian Mobile Disco
- Four Tet
- Magnetic Man ft. Skream & Benga
- Noze
- Heartbreak
- Halfset
- Chris Cunningham
- Okkervil River
- Magnolia Electric Company
- The Low Anthem
- Villagers
- Tunng
- Jape
- Whitest Boy Alive
- Michachu and the Shapes
- The Walkmen
- Michael Nyman
- Dublin Gospel Choir
- Quantic Soul Orchestra
- Jazzanova
- Marina and the Diamonds

Preceded by Electric Picnic 2008	Electric Picnic; 2009	Succeeded by Electric Picnic 2010
