= Long Distance Swimmer =

Studio album by Adrian Crowley
- Released: 2007
- Recorded: Foxrock, County Dublin, Ireland
- Label: Tin Angel Records

Adrian Crowley chronology
A Northern Country (2004)	Long Distance Swimmer (2007)	Season of the Sparks (2009)

Long Distance Swimmer is the fourth studio album released by Irish singer-songwriter Adrian Crowley. It was recorded during a one-week period in the home of Crowley's sister in the suburb of Foxrock, County Dublin, was released on the Tin Angel record label, and features contributions from other musicians, such as James Yorkston.

Professional ratings
Review scores
Source	Rating
entertainment.ie	3/5 stars
The Guardian	3/5 stars
Hot Press	4/5 stars

The album was released as soon as it was recorded as, according to Crowley, he became "fed up waiting". It was recorded with engineer Stephen Shannon. The record received positive reviews and was nominated for the Choice Music Prize. The NME said it was "a lo-furnished, snug, auburn-tinged folk album which calls to mind Bill Callahan, Johnny Cash, and Edwyn Collins". The Irish Independent's John Meagher named it his favourite album of 2007 and his sixteenth best Irish album of the decade, while his colleague Eamon Sweeney suggested Crowley's record was one of the few Irish albums preventing that year from being "an absolute stinker". Lauren Murphy, who reviewed the Long Distance Swimmer for entertainment.ie, gave it three out of five stars and said it was "certainly the sort of album that's best appreciated when aligned with a certain mood; but, nonetheless, like its title, it has a determined durability that can only be admired". Ian Gittins, who reviewed Long Distance Swimmer for The Guardian, also gave it three out of five stars and called the record "a lo-fi, high-intensity collection of acoustic musings that suggest Van Morrison singing with Red House Painters", adding "Crowley's rich brown croon inevitably recalls Nick Drake or Tim Buckley, but a more apposite musical touchstone is Badly Drawn Boy, or the Divine Comedy's Neil Hannon eschewing his clever-clever wordplay in order to sink into a sepia reverie". Ed Power, who reviewed the album for Hot Press, gave it four out of five stars and called Long Distance Swimmer "a goose-bump inducing collection of folk ballads and bare-boned post-rock".

== Awards ==
Long Distance Swimmer was nominated for the Choice Music Prize for Irish Album of the Year 2007 but lost to Super Extra Bonus Party's Super Extra Bonus Party LP.

Year	Nominee / work	Award	Result
2009	Long Distance Swimmer	Irish Album of the Year 2007	Nominated
