= Lluther =

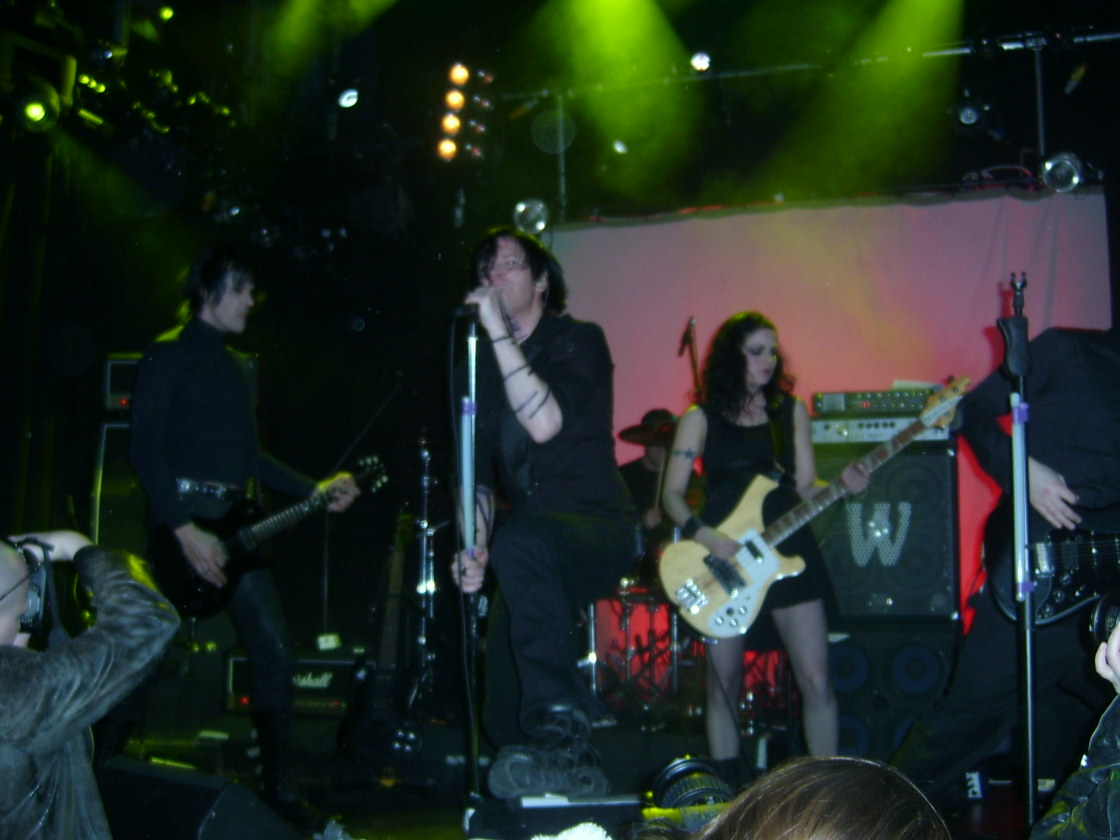
- Live @ The Village 27 January 2007

Background information
- Origin: Dublin, Ireland
- Genres: Industrial rock; noise rock; alternative metal
- Years active: 2004–present
- Labels: Black Bag Music, EMI
- Members: Gerry Owens; 'H' (Hytham Martin); Leon Guilfoyle; Damien; Logan Firth
- Website: www.lluther.com

Lluther is an Irish noise rock/alternative metal band from Dublin, Ireland, founded in 2004 by songwriter/producer Gerry Owens. The band has released two studio albums, one EP, and seven singles.

Owens has worked with notable industry professionals that include Chris Blackwell (U2, Tricky, Bob Marley, etc.), Dave 'Rave' Ogilvie, Danny Saber, Chris O’Brien, and Richard Dowling.

The studio album Rise of the Reptile King, released in 2011 has spawned four singles released throughout 2010 including In The Dollhouse, King of Nothing, Rise of the Reptile King, and Femme Fatale. The single, In The Dollhouse made it onto the Virgin Rock Radio Airplay Top 20 in Italy in June for 4 weeks, alongside U2, Them Crooked Vultures & Depeche Mode.

== History ==
=== 2004: Formation ===
Lluther was formed in 2004 by Gerry "G" Owens, who was "looking for a new direction in music" following the break-up of his former band Skindive, in which Gerry was the primary songwriter and producer. Skindive had been signed to Chris Blackwell's Palm Pictures Record Label. Skindive experienced album sales in the US and around Europe with some of their music being featured in several television programs as well as used in the MTV Awards ceremony in 2003.

=== 2004–2009: Venus Complex EP, Agents of Empire ===
Shortly after forming, Lluther recorded and self-released their first EP Venus Complex Their full-length studio album Agents of Empire was released shortly afterwards. Agents of Empire was licensed in Germany, Austria and Switzerland through the Tiefdruck label. Owens' songwriting and composing abilities were recognised by EMI Music Publishing where he signed to a major worldwide deal. Working closely with the label they toured extensively in Europe. In 2009, Lluther parted amicably with Tiefdruck.

=== 2009–2011: Rise of the Reptile King ===
Owens spent 2009 writing and producing Rise of the Reptile King, the second studio album from Lluther. The album was mixed by Chris O'Brien and Graham Murphy at The Production Suite, Dublin and Mastered by Richard Dowling.

=== 2011-2012: US Tour, SuicideGirls and Singles ===
Lluther toured extensively across the US during 2011, racking up 10 months on the road. 'In The Dollhouse', 'King of Nothing' and 'Rise of the Reptile King' were released as singles. In The Dollhouse went into the Virgin Rock Radio Airplay Top 20 in Italy in June for 4 weeks, alongside U2, Them Cooked Vultures & Depeche Mode. In April, Lluther were featured on the Suicide Girls Radio show alongside Kottonmouth Kings

=== 2012- Present: Movie Trailers....and silence ===
In 2012 Owens took a break from touring. He began composing and producing for Movie Trailers between 2012 and 2015. His music has been used in the theatrical trailers for Thor Dark World, The Edge of Tomorrow, San Andreas, Tomorrowland, The Lone Ranger as well as TV and Movies around the world. Since 2015, Owens and Lluther have been silent.

== Discography ==
Albums

Year	Release	Notes
2004	Venus Complex EP: EP; Label: Black Bag Music; Released: Early 2004	
2005	Agents of Empire: Studio album; Label: Black Bag Music/TDM/Universal/EMI Music Publishing; Released: August 2005	Released in Ireland in 2007. Licensed in Germany, Austria and Switzerland through TDM/Universal
2011	Rise of the Reptile King: Studio album; Label: Black Bag Music/EMI Music Publishing; Released: 2011	Released worldwide in 2011 under 383 Music and EMI Music Publishing

Singles

Year	Release
2005	"People Is Ugly": Label: Black Bag Music/TDM/Universal/EMI Music Publishing; Released: May 2005
2005	"Fixer": Label: Black Bag Music/TDM/Universal/EMI Music Publishing; Released: September 2005
2006	"For You": Label: Black Bag Music/TDM/Universal/EMI Music Publishing; Released: October 2006
2010	"In The Dollhouse": Label: Black Bag Music/EMI Music Publishing; Released: January 2010
2010	"King of Nothing": Label: Black Bag Music/EMI Music Publishing; Released: February 2010
2010	"Rise of the Reptile King": Label: Black Bag Music/EMI Music Publishing; Released: February 2010
2010	"Femme Fatale": Label: Black Bag Music/EMI Music Publishing; Released: March 2010
