= Skindive =

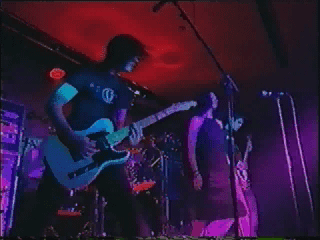
- Skindive live in dublin 2001

Background information
- Origin: Dublin, Ireland
- Genres: Electronic rock
- Years active: 1999–2003
- Labels: Palm Pictures LLC
- Website: https://www.facebook.com/skindive/

Skindive was an Irish electronic rock band formed in the late 1990s in Dublin. The band incorporated electronic sounds into often harsh and atmospheric music and comparisons were often drawn to the band Garbage because of the juxtaposition of heavily distorted guitars and clean female vocals.

== Formation ==
Skindive was formed in 1999 by Gerry Owens. Owens had previously been living in London playing with a series of groups which met with little or no success. Once returning to Dublin, Owens began working on writing his own music which eventually formed into the creation of the band.

Owens found his bassist (Alan Lee) and drummer (Ger Farrell) during the first four months of recruiting but found it tougher to pick the right voice to go with his music and lyrics. After much auditioning, Owens got a recommendation to try out Danielle Harrison who was living in Los Angeles at the time. Inevitably, Danielle was the voice Owens was searching for and she moved to Dublin to join them. Gerry Owens said on creating the band:

"I've been in several bands at this stage, and they all implode because of the personalities involved. It was very important to me to think in the long-term for Skindive. It took a long time to put the right people together."

Over the next year, the newly formed Skindive played gigs in and around Dublin and perfected their stage performance. During this time, the band journeyed to America in pursuit of a record deal with Chris Blackwell's Palm Records. After Blackwell had heard the band's demo, he traveled to Ireland to watch them in concert. He immediately signed the band to Palm Records and they began working on recording their first album entitled Skindive.

== Debut album ==
Skindive first recorded and released the Tranquilizer EP in January, 2001 followed by their eponymous debut album released in February, 2001 on Palm Records. Owens took on most of the production and recording himself along with Adrian Sherwood (Nine Inch Nails, Sinéad O'Connor) and Alan Branch co-producing a number of tracks. The Album was mixed and mastered by Dave 'Rave' Ogilvie (Marilyn Manson, Nine Inch Nails, Skinny Puppy) in Vancouver.

Hotpress wrote, "Despite positive reviews, their eponymous debut album failed to chart and resulted in them transferring their allegiances to Alphamale. "

== Follow up and break up ==
In 2002, after touring, the band suddenly found themselves lacking support from Palm Records. Danielle has said in an interview with Cluas.com:

"One by one it seemed all of the people who had been championing us left the company until we were left on our own. And with them in New York and us over here it was very difficult to keep things moving."

In the end, the band asked Palm Records to release them from their contract which happened successfully. During this period, Skindive was close to breaking up but Gerry Owens and Danielle continued to write new music.

Eventually the band signed to the independent label AlphaMale Recordings, prepared for their follow-up album entitled Falling Down and releasing a single called Precious (which received regular air play on Pet Sounds, Today FM). Because this single failed to enter the top 30, the album was shelved and the band broke up.

Gerry Owens has since gone on to write and produce for his new project 'Lluther' whose live band included ex-Skindive drummer Ger Farrell.

== Band members ==
- Gerry Owens - Guitar/Songwriter
- Danielle Harrison - Vocals
- Alan Lee - Bass
- Ger Farrell - Drums

Skindive were managed by Dermot F Geoghegan

== Discography ==
Year	Information
2001	Tranquilizer: EP; Label: Island Records/Palm Pictures; Released: January 2001
2001	Skindive: Studio album; Label: Island Records/Palm Pictures; Released: February 2001
2001	3 EP: EP; Label: Island Records/Palm Pictures; Released: June 2001
