= Dark Eyed Messenger =

Studio album by Adrian Crowley
- Released: 27 October 2017
- Length: 45:34
- Label: Chemikal Underground
- Producer: Thomas Bartlett

Adrian Crowley chronology
Some Blue Morning (2014)	Dark Eyed Messenger (2017)

Professional ratings
Aggregate scores
Source	Rating
Metacritic	84/100
Review scores
Source	Rating
AllMusic	4/5 stars
The Irish Times	4/5 stars
The Skinny	4/5 stars

Dark Eyed Messenger is the eighth studio album by Irish singer-songwriter Adrian Crowley. It was released on 27 October 2017 through Chemikal Underground.

== Track listing ==
No.	Title	Length
1.	"The Wish"	4:51
2.	"Halfway to Andulacia"	3:11
3.	"Silver Birch Tree"	3:07
4.	"Little Breath"	3:55
5.	"Valley of Tears"	5:08
6.	"The Photographs"	5:57
7.	"Unhappy Seamstress"	4:50
8.	"Catherine in the Dunes"	3:16
9.	"Lullaby to a Lost Astronaut"	4:34
10.	"And So Goes the Night"	3:03
11.	"Still This Desire"	3:42
