= Niall Mellon =

Irish businessman (born 1967)

- Born: 1967 (age 58–59)
- Occupations: Entrepreneur, philanthropist
- Known for: Charity work (Niall Mellon Township Trust)
- Website: https://www.melloneducate.com/

Niall J. Mellon (born 1967) is an Irish entrepreneur, charity Chief Executive and property developer who founded the Niall Mellon Township Trust to provide homes to impoverished communities in South Africa's townships.

== Early life and career ==
Mellon grew up in Ballyroan, County Dublin. After finishing school, Mellon joined his father's personalised investment brokerage.

At age 24, he set up his own mortgage company, and subsequently grew his property and financial services interests through the Niall J. Mellon Group. He carried out several highly successful development projects in Great Britain and in Ireland and acquired numerous properties through his primary investment and syndicate vehicle Earthquake Property Partners. He was affected by the post-2008 Irish banking crisis, losing the bulk of his wealth.

== Philanthropy ==
In 2002, aged 35, Mellon began to spend most of his time working to help the poor. While on a visit to South Africa, he was moved by the poverty of some township communities near Cape Town, and subsequently formed the house building charity, the "Niall Mellon Township Trust", primarily with his own funds. In 2013 Mellon Educate was established with the goal of building and refurbishing schools in South Africa and Kenya.

As of March 2014 the charity had built about 22,000 houses for 120,000 South Africans.

== Honours and awards ==
In 2005, Mellon was awarded an honorary doctorate from the Dublin Institute of Technology and in 2008, an honorary doctorate in law from University College Cork.
