= The Upgrades =

- Origin: Dublin, Ireland
- Genres: Ska-punk
- Years active: 2006–March 2010

The Upgrades were a third wave ska band from Dublin, Ireland. Goldenplec.com named them as their "band of the week"" during March 2009 and hailed them as

Probably the best known unknown band in Dublin.

In 2006 they opened the Irish date of the International "Taste of Chaos Tour", sharing the stage with well-known bands such as Taking Back Sunday, Alexisonfire and Anti-Flag. They announced their split-up on March 26, 2010 on their Myspace blog. They played two farewell shows in April in Dublin one on the 4th with American punk rockers The Lawrence Arms and another on the 8th with Dublin Pop-Punk band Jody Has A Hitlist.

== Album ==
The Upgrades debut 12-track album, Take A Risk, was released in 2009 on May 4. The band played in Dublin venue The Academy to support the launch of the album.

Track listing

1. The Thing Is
2. Rock’n’Fuck’n’Roll
3. Square One
4. You Should Know
5. Nothing
6. Angel Of Horror
7. Bukkake (no regrets)
8. Wrong About Me
9. Better Way
10. Somethin, I Dunno...
11. Friends & Idiots
12. This Is Us

== Exposure ==
As well as playing alongside the likes of Taking Back Sunday and Anti-Flag the band were also selected to open the main stage at Europe’s biggest ska-punk festival - Mighty Sounds 2008 in Prague. They also performed at one of Ireland's biggest music festivals, Electric Picnic.
