= Shouting at Planes =

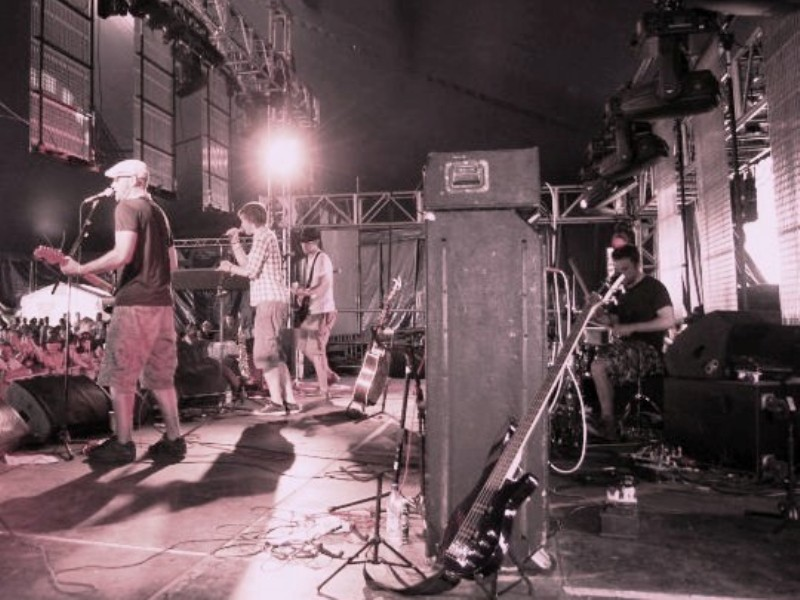
- Shouting at Planes performing at the 40th Anniversary of Glastonbury - June 2010.

Background information
- Origin: Cavan, Ireland
- Genres: Blues rock, boogie rock, indie rock, alternative rock
- Years active: 2010–2014
- Past members: Liam McCabe; Kevin Kelleher; Aodhan McBreen; Garreth Tackney; Brian O'Reilly

Shouting At Planes were an Irish alternative indie band from Cavan, Ireland.

== History ==
The band won a national competition in 2010, which consisted of over 100 bands, with the final prize being a slot at the Glastonbury festival. The band had only been playing together three months at the time when they won this prize. They played to a full house on the Queen's Head Stage at Glastonbury on Saturday 26 June of that year. Shortly afterwards they launched their first single 'Hospice' in August 2010. The attendance at the launch gig in CrawDaddy was such that over 100 people were left outside as the venue had reached capacity. Without any promotion or label backing, the single debuted at 23 in the Irish chart.

October of that year, saw the band play support to Imelda May in front of 3,500 people at the Virginia Pumpkin Festival. A few days later, Shouting At Planes release their second single on 12 November, entitled "So Young". The launch gig was held fronting another packed house at the Button Factory, with support from The Dirty 9's, and MC'd by 2fm's Paddy McKenna. Later that year, the band went on to win another battle of the bands competition, Phantom 105.2 Next Beck's Thing. They finished off the year playing support to Fight Like Apes in The Village on New Year's Eve.

Shouting At Planes released their debut EP titled Surrender The Academy 2 in April 2011 which they performed across Ireland that summer at music festivals including Electric Picnic, Indiependance, Temple House and Le Cheile.

== Discography ==
=== Singles ===
| Year | Title | Peak chart position |
| Year | Title | IRL |
|---|---|---|
| 2010 | "Hospice" | 23 |
| 2010 | "So Young" | — |
"—" denotes a title that did not chart.
