= Jody Has A Hitlist =

Irish pop punk band

- Origin: Dublin, Ireland and Belfast, Northern Ireland, Edinburgh, Scotland
- Genres: Pop punk
- Years active: 2009–2014
- Labels: Unsigned
- Past members: Francis McDonnell; Jason Boland; Des Foley; Kelan O'Reilly; Pádraig McAlister; Conor Ebbs; Ben Hogan; Kevin O'Shea
- Website: jodyhasahitlist.tumblr.com

Jody Has A Hitlist were a pop punk band from Dublin, Ireland. They formed in April 2009, from previous bands such as Steer Clear (Pádraig McAlister, Conor Ebbs) and The Upgrades (Kelan O'Reilly), and have since performed alongside artists such as Lostprophets, The Used and Kids In Glass Houses. In 2010, they were nominated for the Most Promising New Artist award at the Meteor Awards.

== Biography ==
=== Early days (2009-2011) ===
Jody Has A Hitlist formed in April 2009, following the break-up of the members' previous bands (Steer Clear, The Upgrades). The initial line-up consisted of Pádraig McAlister, Conor Ebbs, Kelan O'Reilly, Francis McDonnell and Des Foley. Due to educational commitments, Des Foley was later replaced by Jason (Jay) Boland. On 30 June 2009, the band played their first show supporting Metro Station at the Olympia Theatre in Dublin, shortly after releasing their 3-track, self-titled EP in May of that year. In October, they also supported General Fiasco at the Ulster Hall in Belfast. In November 2009, the band released a single, entitled You Used To Be Fun and travelled to the UK to record their second EP with Matt O'Grady. The title of the EP was revealed as Boy Caught Envy and it was released in July 2010. During the course of the year, music videos were recorded for the tracks Just Over A Year and Boy Caught Envy. Later in the year, Ben Hogan replaced Jason Boland as the lead guitarist when he left to join Kodaline.

=== Choose Your Battles Mini-Album (2011-2012) ===
On 4 April 2011, Jody Has A Hitlist released their new 6-track EP, Choose Your Battles. The recording of the EP took place at Longwave Studios. After its release, the band toured extensively, including acting as main support on Yashin's UK tour. A music video for the track Through It All was released on 10 August 2011.

The band supported Paramore and You Me at Six and Pure Love at Belsonic 2012.

=== Touring and First Album (2012 – 2014) ===
In terms of 2012, the band had a relatively un-eventful year. On their Facebook page, Jody Has A Hitlist announced two tour dates for London, United Kingdom and Dublin, Republic of Ireland for early 2013, as well as announcing the release of their first album for 2013. On 18 November, the band announced that they were demoeing for their new album and that they were going to be shooting their video for the second track on their 'Choose Your Battles Mini-Album', 'Hit Me Like A Hurricane' in Manchester, United Kingdom in 2013, as well as recording their new single entitled 'Delete Me'. On 18 November they wrote on their Facebook page: 'Jody Has A Hitlist November 2012 // We're demoing and writing up our debut album at the moment – we can't wait for you all to hear it! Very different but still us, feels like a brand new start!

We're shooting the 'Hit Me Like A Hurricane' music video in a few weeks and then following that up with heading back in the New Year to Longwave Studios in Cardiff to record our brand new single 'Delete Me' with the legend that is Romesh who did our mini album 'Choose Your Battles'. VERY EXCITE. Thanks to everyone for the support over 2012, had the times of our lives. 2013 is shaping up to be insane.'

=== Break Up (2014) ===
On 1 September 2014, the band posted a Facebook update stating that, whilst in the process of recording new material, they felt it was very different to the 'Jody Has A Hitlist" sound and decided that it best to "draw a line under Jody".

They played their last 2 shows in Dublin and Belfast, supporting Kids in Glass Houses' Farewell tour. They signed off on 4 October 2014 with "Thanks for everything". They released the album post-humous for free download.

== Discography ==
=== EPs ===
Year	Title	Label
2009	Jody Has A Hitlist EP	Self Released
2010	Boy Caught Envy EP	Self Released
2011	Choose Your Battles EP	Self Released

=== CDs ===
Year	Title	Label
2015	You: My Drug, My Downfall	Self Released

== Band members ==
=== Final lineup ===
- Pádraig McAlister – Rhythm guitar, Lead vocals (2009–2014)
- Conor Ebbs – Bass guitar (2009–2014)
- Ben Hogan – Lead guitar (2010–2014)
- Kevin O'Shea – Drums (2012–2014)

=== Former ===
- Francis McDonnell – Drums (2009–2012)
- Kelan O'Reilly – Keyboard, Backing vocals (2009–2012)
- Jason Boland – Lead Guitar (2009–2010)
- Des Foley – Lead Guitar (2009)
