= We Should Be Dead =

Irish alternative rock band

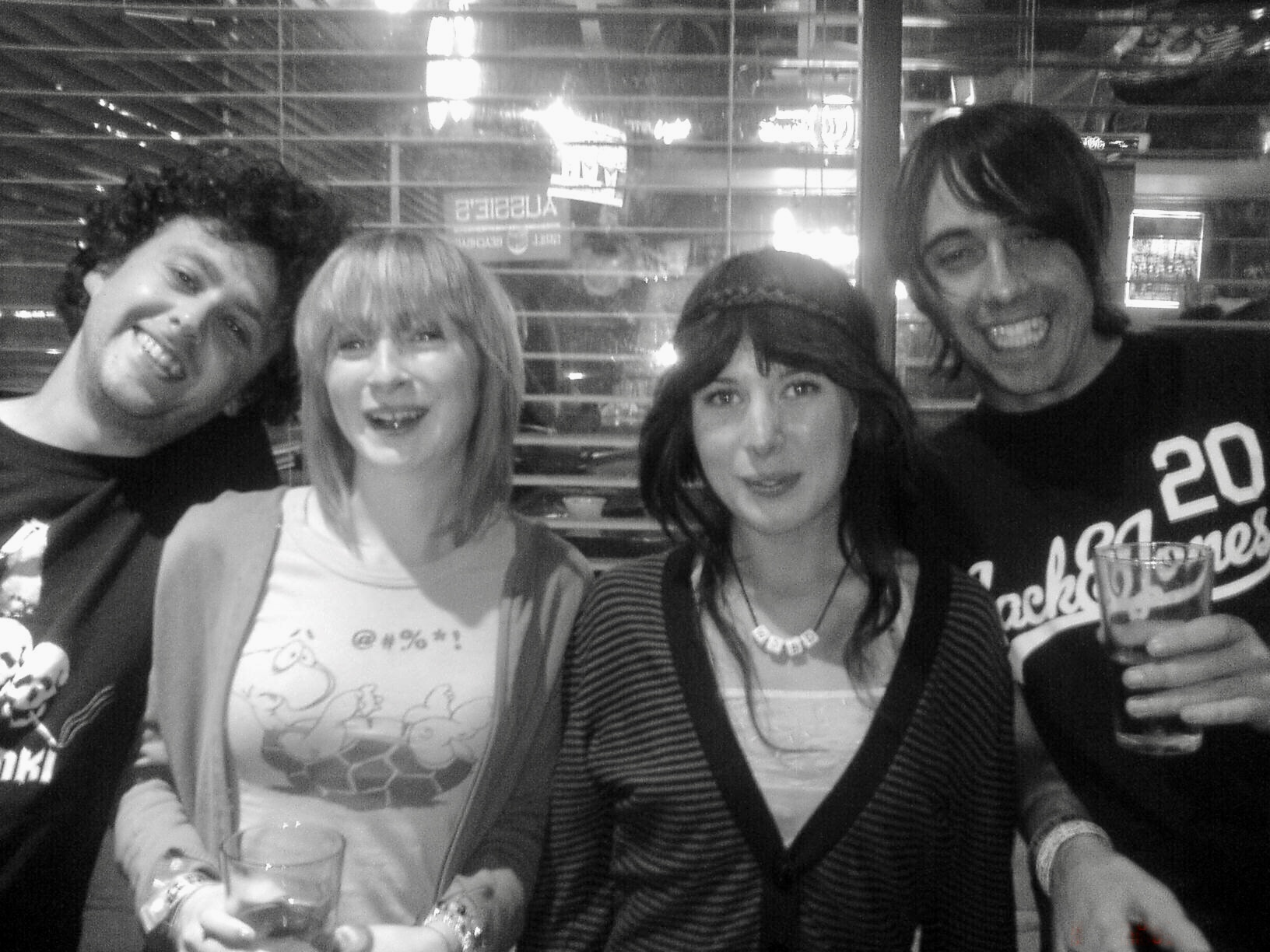
- We Should Be Dead

Background information
- Origin: Limerick, Ireland
- Genres: alternative rock
- Years active: 2003–2010
- Past members: Tara Nix (Vocals/Synths) Anna Murphy (Guitar/Vocals); Stephen Purcell (Drums) Gary Healy (Bass 2003 - 2009); Max Harrison (Bass - 2009); Gary Carroll (Bass/Vocals - 2010) Aaron Corr (Guitar/Synth - 2010)

We Should Be Dead were an alternative rock band from Limerick, Ireland, active from 2003 to 2010. The band released two albums, Forget Romance, Let's Dance! (2008) and Dreamstate (2010)through the POP4POP Recording Group imprint. The band relocated to Los Angeles in 2009 after signing with a Burbank-based management company. During the band's stint in Los Angeles they opted to decline an offer from NBC to take part in a reality TV show based around the band's daily activity. We Should Be Dead were also the inspiration for a chapter in Hugh MacLeod's bestselling book Evil Plans - Having Fun on the Road to World Domination. Celebrity fans include, Mike Chapman Rodney Bingenheimer.

== History ==
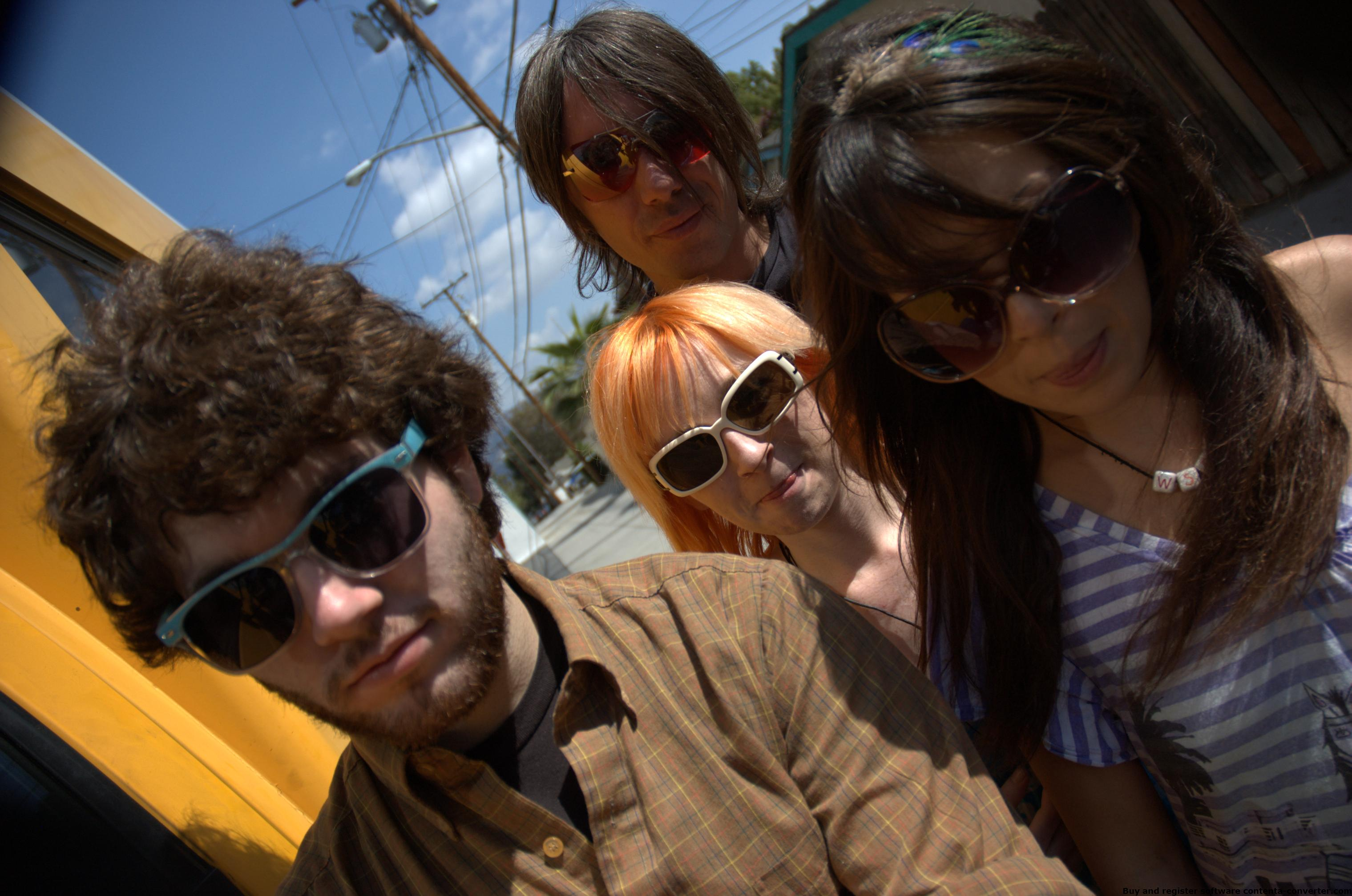
Version 2.0

We Should Be Dead began life as a studio project between drummer/songwriter Stephen Purcell and vocalist Tara Nix. The line up of the band changed several times from the band's inception. Version 1.0 and the most recognised line up consisted of Tara Nix (vocals/synth) Anna Murphy (guitar/vocals) Gary Healy (bass) and Stephen Purcell (drums). During the recording of the band's 2009 album Dreamstate in Los Angeles, bassist Gary Healy quit the band and returned home to Ireland. Los Angeles native Max Harrison was drafted in to replace Healy for studio and live sessions for the remainder of the year. This era was referred to as We Should Be Dead Version 2.0. When the band returned to Ireland, it was decided that Harrison would remain in his native Los Angeles. In 2010 the band announced they had expanded to a five-piece to replicate much of their new material live. The band recruited Aaron Corr (Guitar/Synth) and Garry Carroll (Bass/Vocals) for the remainder of 2010. This was referred to as Version 3.0. The band's amicable split ended with a hometown show on New Year's Eve 2010.

== Career ==
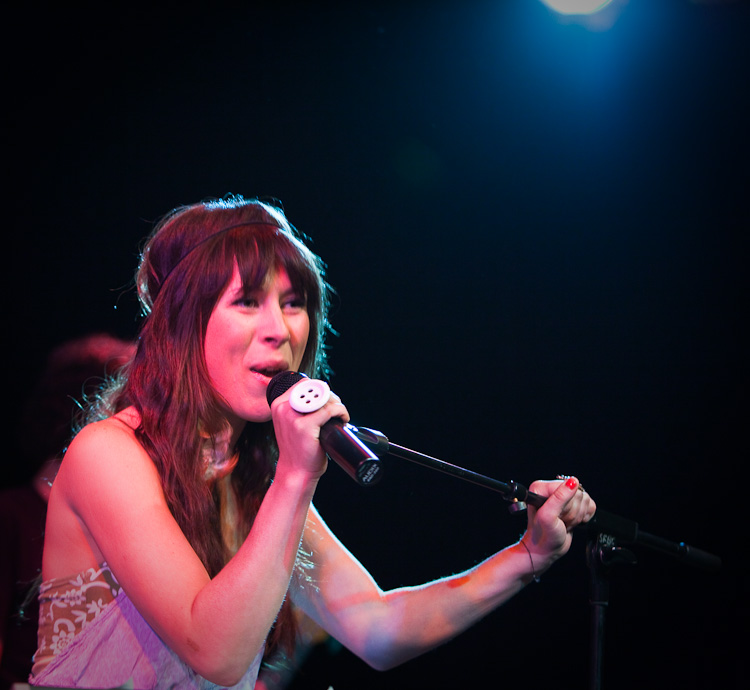
Live in Santa Fe, New Mexico.

=== 2007 ===
The band's debut single Forget Romance Let's Dance! made a huge impact on its release in November 2007, landing at number 3 in the Irish charts. The single was A-Listed on all the major radio stations, and gained exposure on BBC Radio 1 in the UK. The promo video for the single was produced and directed by Peter Delaney.

=== 2008 ===
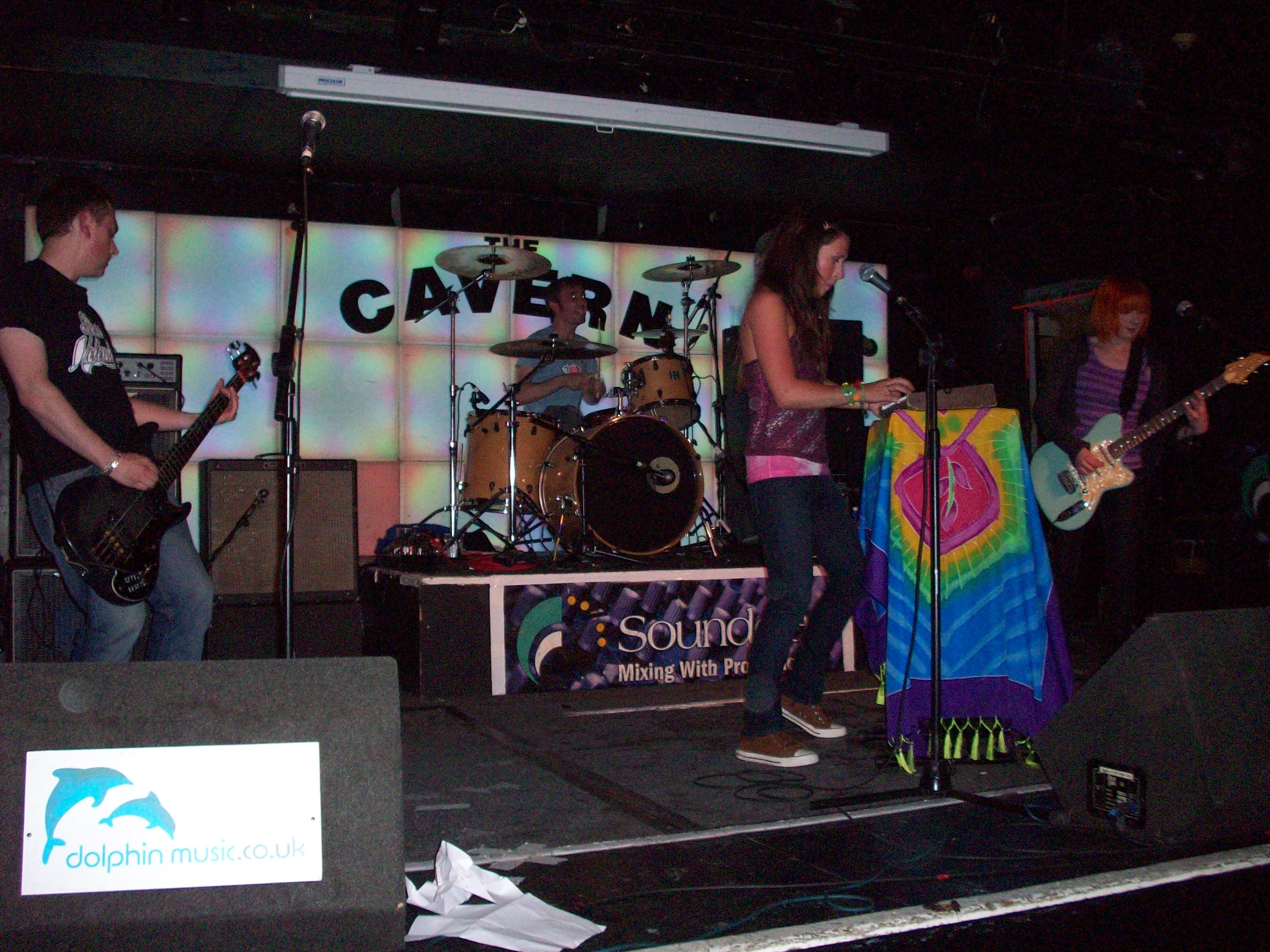
The Cavern Club - Liverpool

The band's debut album Forget Romance, Let's Dance! was released worldwide on 1 February 2008. The band released two more singles from their debut album Forget Romance, Let's Dance! in the form of the Valentine's Day exclusive I Fell In Love With You and the cheeky, beat pop influenced Zero Point Five. The promo video for the later was filmed and directed by Shane Serrano. The band also attended Ireland's annual Meteor Music Awards, where they were nominated as "Best Newcomers".

=== 2009 ===
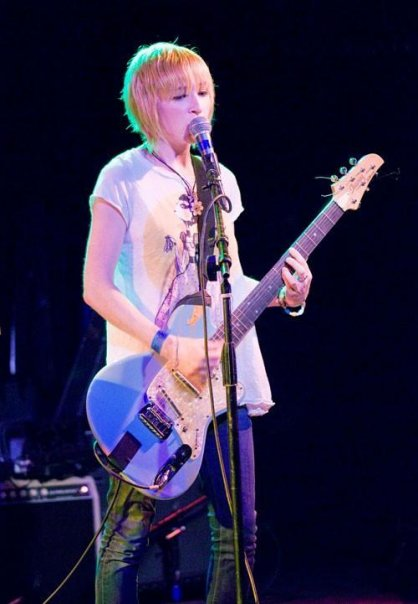
Live at The Roxy Theatre, Sunset Strip, Los Angeles.

We Should Be Dead relocated to Los Angeles in January 2009 to begin work on their second album Dreamstate. The album was produced by Owen Lewis in the Record Plant Studio in Hollywood. In between recording the album the band completed six US tours. A performance at South by South West led them signing to the Green Room Agency. The band also hit the CMJ Festival in New York where they showcased their forthcoming album with six live shows in Manhattan.

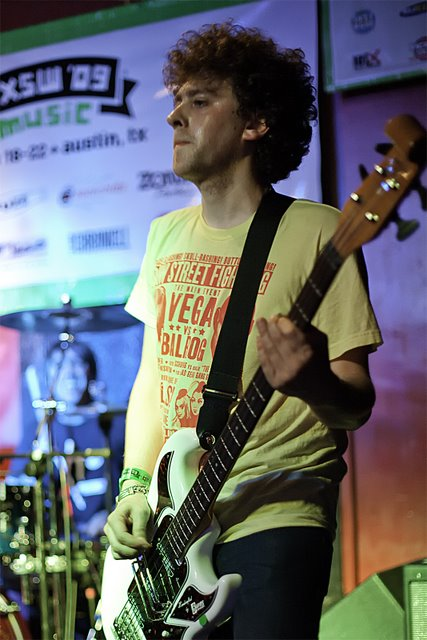
South by South West 2009 - Austin, Texas.

=== 2010 ===
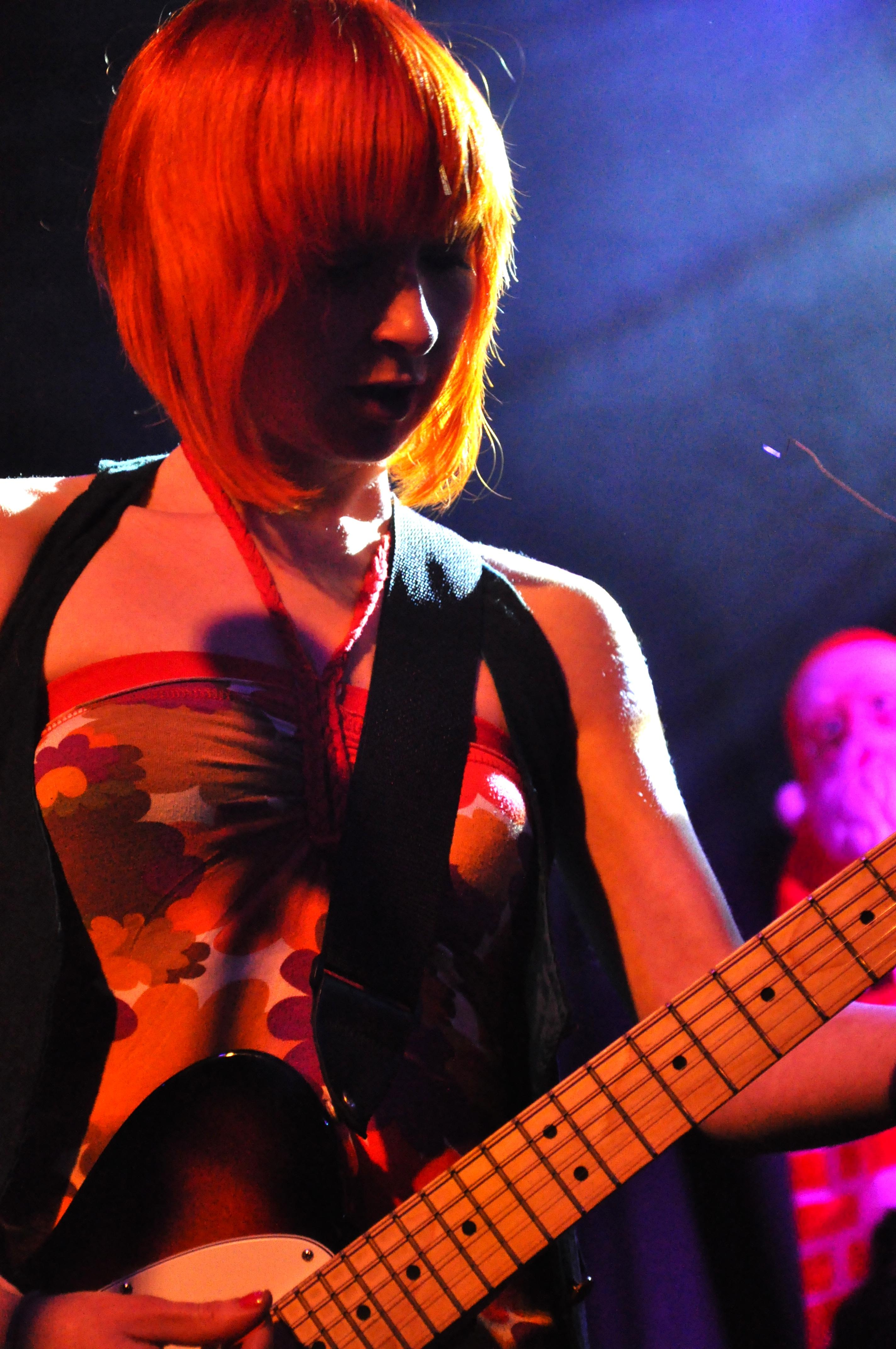
Dreamstate Tour 2010

The first single to be lifted from the band's second album was Up All Night, released on 1 June 2010. The band's second album Dreamstate was released to critical acclaim on 2 July 2010. The second single to be lifted from Dreamstate was Breathe In. The promo video was produced and directed by Cashmere Media. The band spent the remainder of the year touring the album in their native Ireland, before their amicable split in December of that year.

=== 2012 ===
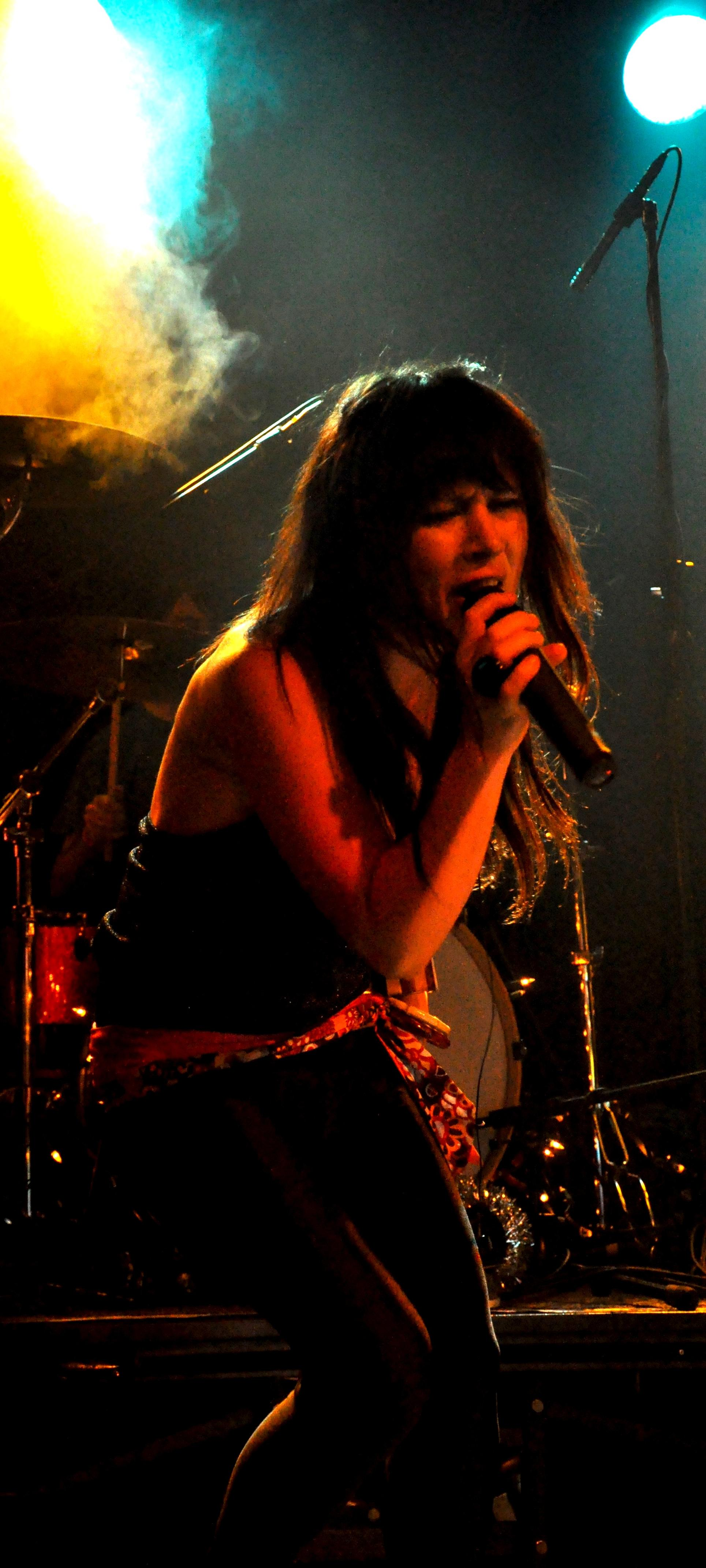
Hometown Christmas Show 2008

In 2012 the band made their version of the Womack & Womack classic Teardrops available as a free download from their official website. The song had been recorded in 2010 but never released.

=== 2013 ===
'From the Vaults' a collection of rare We Should Be Dead demo tapes, b-side, outtakes and live recordings was released through the band's official website in September. The 30 track collection coincided with the 10th anniversary of the band's formation.

=== Reviews ===
- Hot Press - "These are highly accessible, superbly structured songs played by a band which has clearly been studying how to deploy catchy winding melodies" 8/10
- Irish Times- "Sprightly songs punctuated by the right degree of cockiness. They'll take to the future like a duck to water."
- Frequency Ireland - "The resurrected sounds and spirit of a lost generation" 10/10"
- Hot Press - "Somehow all this discomfort makes for a hell of a catchy tune (don't ask me how they do it – I call it the Mika effect). Though buzzing with noise (electronic and organic) there's no OTT flashiness on this - just pop, shaken not stirred."
- Entertainment.ie - "When all is said and done, though, We Should Be Dead aren't lying; if nothing else, you'll want to dance your arse off to practically every song on this fizzy, frothy gem of an album" 4/5.

== Discography ==
=== Albums ===
- Forget Romance, Let's Dance! (2008)
- Dreamstate (2010)

=== Singles ===
- Forget Romance, Let's Dance! - 30 November 2007
- I Fell In Love With You - 14 February 2008
- Zero Point Five - 25 July 2008
- Up All Night - 18 June 2010
- Breathe In - 22 October 2010
- Teardrops - 5 August 2012
