= Electric Picnic 2010 =

- Genre: Indie
- Dates: 3–5 September 2010
- Locations: Stradbally Hall, Stradbally, County Laois, Ireland
- Website: www.electricpicnic.ie

Electric Picnic 2010 was the seventh edition of the Electric Picnic festival to take place. The three-day event took take place on the weekend of Friday 3, Saturday 4 and Sunday 5 September at Stradbally Hall in Stradbally, County Laois, Ireland. The festival was launched on 24 March 2010.

Among the headliners were Roxy Music, performing in 2010 for the first time in five years and making their Irish festival debut, and Leftfield, who gave live performances for the first time in more than a decade. Public Image Ltd. (PiL) made their Irish debut at the festival while The Frames appeared in their twentieth anniversary year. Massive Attack also return after performing at the 2006 festival.

Jim Carroll of The Irish Times named several Electric Picnic 2010-bound acts in his "20 hottest acts playing this summer" on 28 May 2010: these were The National, Villagers, LCD Soundsystem and Public Image Ltd.

== Tickets ==
Early bird tickets for Electric Picnic 2010 went on sale on 4 December 2009. The festival was launched on 24 March 2010.

A ticket scheme allowing buyers to purchase tickets with their credit cards in three installments was put into place.

== Launch ==
Among the first acts announced were Roxy Music, Public Image Ltd., Massive Attack, Leftfield, Mumford & Sons, Jón Þór Birgisson, Gil Scott-Heron, LCD Soundsystem, Booka Shade, Crystal Castles, The Big Pink, 808 State, Modest Mouse, Fever Ray, Beach House and Seasick Steve. Among the first Irish acts announced were The Frames, Paul Brady, Villagers, Imelda May, Choice Music Prize winner Adrian Crowley, rap duo Messiah J and the Expert, Afro-Celt Sound System and The Rubberbandits—a pair of Limerick rappers who perform with plastic bags over their heads and who noted for their ditty on Willie O'Dea composed following his resignation as Minister for Defence.The Rubberbandits attended the launch. According to The Irish Times (The Ticket), the initial announcements were treated with a "largely positive response" by fans.

Weekend tickets went on general sale on 26 March 2010. There are no day tickets for this festival, however, two children will be admitted for free per individual adult.

Fringe areas such as the Body and Soul Arena, the Arts Trail, Mindfield Spoken Word, Lucent Dossier Experience, Greencrafts and Global Green and Discovery were all confirmed to be included in 2010 alongside a circus and comedy events.

== Post-launch announcements ==
On 8 April, former Dead Can Dance musician Brendan Perry confirmed he would be performing on the Sunday of Electric Picnic 2010.

On 5 May, it was announced that a campaign to gain Electric Picnic status for a band from County Laois had been successful. Friendly Fires, Laurent Garnier, The Fall, Bonobo, Stornoway, Fight Like Apes and Channel One were announced around this time.

On 6 May, Bad Lieutenant announced they would performing on the Saturday night of the festival.

On 19 May, Thomas Cosby denied that a new gateway entrance planned for Stradbally Hall was connected with the Electric Picnic.

On 24 May, These New Puritans announced via their MySpace a performance on the Friday of Electric Picnic.

On 14 June, Stars were announced.

On 17 June, Radiohead drummer Phil Selway announced he would be there.

On 21 July, the following were announced: Robyn, Two Door Cinema Club, Laura Marling, The Antlers, The Tallest Man on Earth, Cymbals Eat Guitars, Chew Lips, Fang Island, The Riptide Movement, Donal Dineen and Brian Deady.

On 4 August, more acts were announced: Janelle Monáe, Duke Special, Dennis Alacapone & The Dubcats, Mountain Man, Neon Indian, Freelance Whales, Hurts, Delta Maid, O Emperor, Joe Echo and Vengeance & The Panther Queen.

On 11 August, Marc Almond (from Soft Cell) was announced.

On 12 August, Tiga was announced as the headliner of the Little Big Tent, while Juan Atkins was also announced.

== Hot Press Chatroom ==
This included Foals, Imelda May, Fight Like Apes, Cathy Davey, and Stars.

Preceded by Electric Picnic 2009	Electric Picnic; 2010	Succeeded by incumbent
