= The Juliana Field =

Studio album by Rob Smith
- Released: 20 August 2010
- Genre: Rock
- Length: 40.16
- Label: Cocklebob Recordings
- Producer: Colin Whelan Rob Smith

Rob Smith chronology
Throwing it All Away (2008)	The Juliana Field (2010)	Live in New York & Dublin (2011)

The Juliana Field is the second album by Irish musician Rob Smith. It was released on August 20, 2010.
Irish music magazine Hot Press described favourably it as "an interesting record from a distinctive voice" despite a slightly sub-par production for a commercial record. Smith himself commented in detail about the recordings claiming that two tracks included were lo-fi demos that simply "didn't sound as fun" when recorded in professional studios.

== Track listing ==
1. "Way Back Home"
2. "All In My Mind"
3. "The Stomp Song"
4. "Rue Sainte-Dominique"
5. "Just Fine"
6. "Talking About People"
7. "Marrakesh"
8. "Shine On (Let Me Be the One)"
9. "Digger's Blues"
10. "The Juliana Field"
