= Season of the Sparks =

Studio album by Adrian Crowley
- Released: 24 April 2009
- Length: 36:00
- Label: Tin Angel Records

Adrian Crowley chronology
| Long Distance Swimmer (2007) | Season of the Sparks (2009) |

Professional ratings
Review scores
| Source | Rating |
|---|---|
| Clash | link |
| Hot Press | link |
| The Irish Times | link |
| RTÉ | link |
| State | Orange link |
| The Sunday Times | link |

Season of the Sparks is the fifth studio album released by Irish singer-songwriter Adrian Crowley. On March 3, 2010, it was announced as the winner of the Choice Music Prize for Irish Album of the Year 2009 at Vicar Street, Dublin.

It was released on April 24, 2009.

== Reception ==
Hot Press gave Season of the Sparks five stars, calling it a "batch of beautiful Al Stewart/Leonard Cohenesque pastoral reflections". RTÉ reviewer Harry Guerin gave the record four out of five stars and called it "an album for all seasons". Lauren Murphy, who reviewed the album for The Irish Times, also gave it four out of five stars, stating that this is Crowley's "most consistently beautiful album yet" and that the artist "utilises his lyrical talent to conjure up the most gorgeous imagery this side of the Shannon". The Sunday Times reviewer Dan Cairns also gave it four out of five stars, calling it "a great album" and saying it was " like a Paula Rego painting set to music". State called it "that rare and precious thing, a perfect expression of joy", noting that the first track "Summer Haze Parade" was "Crowley's most overtly uplifting moment to date". Clash praised Crowley's "ability to craft a beautiful lullaby to the simplicity of the countryside".

Season of the Sparks was the last album to be reviewed by Les Inrockuptibles journalist Richard Robert before he retired after 35 years of work. Robert sent a letter to Crowley in Dublin expressing his joy about the album.

== Track listing ==
Season of the Sparks features ten tracks, including the title track "Season of the Sparks".

| No. | Title | Length |
|---|---|---|
| 1. | "Summer Haze Parade" |
| 2. | "The Beekeeper's Wife" |
| 3. | "The Wishing Seat" |
| 4. | "The Three Sisters" |
| 5. | "Squeeze Bees" |
| 6. | "Liberty Stream" |
| 7. | "Horses Like to Dream All Night" |
| 8. | "Season of the Sparks" |
| 9. | "Swedish Room" |
| 10. | "Pay No Mind (To the Dawn Crier)" |
| Total length: | | 36:00 |

== Awards ==
Season of the Sparks won the Choice Music Prize for Irish Album of the Year 2009 at Vicar Street on March 3, 2010. It was chosen by a panel of twelve people from the Irish music industry as most deserving winner from a shortlist of ten albums. Crowley received a prize of €10,000 cheque. He described himself as "totally flabbergasted", adding "I didn't really think it was the sort of record that was going to win awards". Crowley promised to use the money to fund his music. He was one of eight nominees who performed at the awards ceremony, including the Academy Award-winning, Grammy Award-nominated The Swell Season and Crowley's close friend Valerie Francis.

| Year | Nominee / work | Award | Result |
|---|---|---|---|
| 2010 | Season of the Sparks | Choice Music Prize - Irish Album of the Year 2009 | Won |
