= Butterfly Explosion =

- Origin: Dublin, Ireland
- Genres: Shoegazing; Dream pop Post-rock
- Years active: 2005–2011,2021–present
- Label: Revive Records
- Members: Gazz Carr; Laura Smyth
- Past members: 2009-2011: John Coman; Conor Garry 2005-2007: John Canavan; Peter Savage; Sorcha Brennan; Danny Conway
- Website: Official website

Butterfly Explosion are an alternative rock band from Dublin, Ireland.

== History ==
Butterfly Explosion was formed by guitarist/vocalist Gazz Carr in 2005.

By 2007, the band had released two EPs while going through a number of lineup changes. The debut album Lost Trails was released in 2010 on the Revive Records label.. The album was released in the United States in March 2010 ahead of their appearance at South by Southwest and broke into the CMJ 200 charts having entered the Top 30 of 35 college radio stations.

In May 2010, they performed at the Soundcity Festival in Liverpool and supported label mates God Is an Astronaut on their UK and European tours. The band also performed at the Electric Picnic and Arthur's Day Festivals in Ireland in September 2010. They made further festival appearances in 2011 at Indiependence festival in Cork and Canadian Music Week in Toronto, Canada.

The band was inactive for the next decade, during which Carr spent several years as a touring member of God Is An Astronaut.

The band reunited for one-off show at the Academy Dublin in 2021.

== Discography ==
=== LPs ===
- Lost Trails (2010)

=== EPs ===
- Turn the Sky (2006)
- Vision (2005)
