= Rob Smith (Irish musician) =

Irish singer/songwriter, musician and DJ

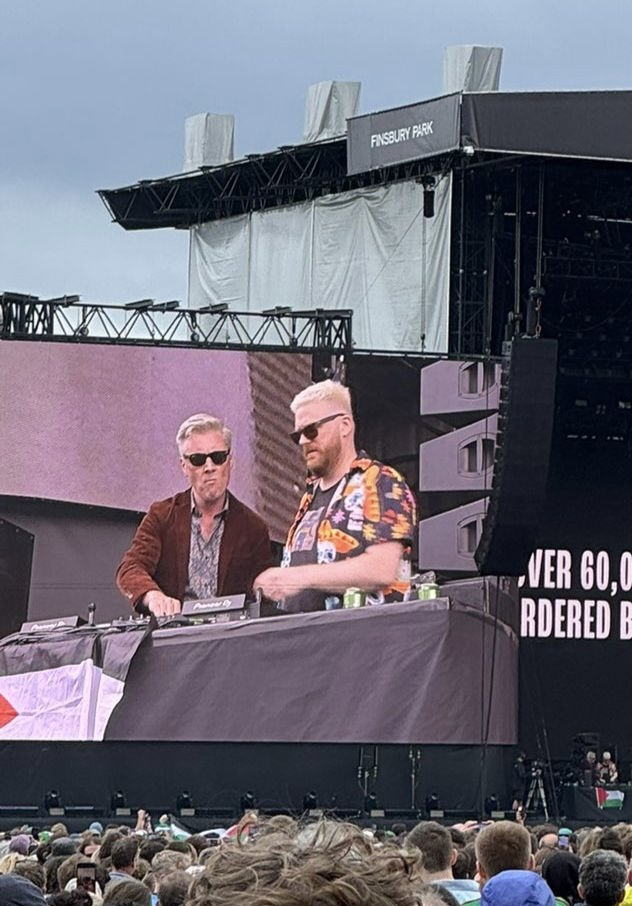
Rob Smith (right) performing at Finsbury Park, London.

Rob Smith (born 29 September 1982) is an Irish singer-songwriter, DJ and writer from Terenure, Dublin. He is married and has one daughter.

== Biography ==
Smith released his debut album, Throwing It All Away, in March 2008 to considerable success and toured in 10 countries across Europe promoting it. The lead single from the album, Stand Up, reached number 1 in the Irish downloads charts that summer. The follow-up, 2010's The Juliana Field, was released to critical acclaim and landed Smith a nomination for Most Promising Act at that year's Meteor Awards. He released a live EP, titled Live in New York & Dublin, the following year. He released a well-received punk rock single in February 2015 called Dale Boca Juniors which charted in both Ireland and Argentina. In May 2015, he released a compilation titled Snapped Strings & Hangovers.

Smith is also active as a DJ, performing at club nights and music events focused on alternative, post-punk and indie music. He has been involved with DJ sets around major live performances, including events surrounding the Fontaines D.C. concert at Finsbury Park in London. He has DJed at events presented by The Workman’s Club in Dublin, including DJ sets associated with Gilla Band and IDLES. His DJ selections draw on post-punk, indie and alternative influences.

Smith is also a published author, writing on football history and culture. He is the author of a book on the Argentine football club Boca Juniors, which examines the club’s history and cultural significance and has been cited in international media. He also wrote *Camp Nou: A very brief history on Europe’s greatest football stadium*, a concise history of FC Barcelona’s iconic ground, published in 2025.

== The Swedish Railway Orchestra ==
The Swedish Railway Orchestra is an electronic project by Smith; he released his debut LP Northern Lights under the name in September 2016, as well the follow-up This Is a Dream to critical acclaim. The project has been described by Smith as a studio-based project rather than a live act, with performances and press activity kept deliberately minimal. Musically, the project has been described in the press as a cross between LCD Soundsystem and Jape. More recently he has enjoyed a fruitful collaboration with Galway's Blowtorch Records, releasing two vinyl LPs Dance To The Drum Machine and Once Upon A Time...

== Discography ==
=== Albums ===
- Throwing It All Away – 15 March 2008
- The Juliana Field – 20 August 2010
- Northern Lights – 1 September 2016 (as The Swedish Railway Orchestra)
- This Is a Dream – 29 September 2017 (as The Swedish Railway Orchestra)
- This Is a Mixtape – 1 May 2019 (as The Swedish Railway Orchestra)
- The Swedish Railway Orchestra – 29 July 2020 (as The Swedish Railway Orchestra)
- Dance To The Drum Machine – 27 July 2022 (as The Swedish Railway Orchestra) Vinyl release by Blowtorch Records
- The Beautiful And Damned – 14 April 2025
- Repetition Without Permission – 1 October 2026 (as The Swedish Railway Orchestra) Vinyl release by Blowtorch Records

=== Extended plays ===
- Live in New York & Dublin – 2011
- Late Night (as The Swedish Railway Orchestra) – 31 October 2016
- Remixes, Vol. 1 (as The Swedish Railway Orchestra) – 26 October 2018
- Connotations (as The Swedish Railway Orchestra) – 4 July 2023

=== Compilations ===
- Snapped Strings & Hangovers – 29 May 2015

=== Singles ===
- "So Many, So Near" – 2008
- "Stand Up" – 2008
- "Rue Sainte-Dominique" – 2011
- "Dale Boca Juniors" – 2015
- "Bostero" – 2016
- "Northern Lights" – 2016 (as The Swedish Railway Orchestra)
- "Water" – 2016 (as The Swedish Railway Orchestra)
- "The Allegiance of Bobby Turbulence" – 2016 (as The Swedish Railway Orchestra)
- "I Don't See Any Daylight Anymore" – 2017 (as The Swedish Railway Orchestra)
- "Time" – 2017 (as The Swedish Railway Orchestra)
- "Why Don't You Talk to Me" – 2017 (as The Swedish Railway Orchestra)
- "All I Want" – 2017 (as The Swedish Railway Orchestra)
- "This Is a Dream" – 2017 (as The Swedish Railway Orchestra)
- "Bullet for a Bullfighter / I Love You (But If You Clap When the Plane Lands, I'll Leave You!)" – 2017 (as The Swedish Railway Orchestra)
- "Wy Bk Hm" – 2019 (as The Swedish Railway Orchestra)
- "Cold Condensation" – 2019 (as The Swedish Railway Orchestra)
- "Hell's Kitchen" – 2019 (as The Swedish Railway Orchestra)
- "The House of Blood" – 2020 (as The Swedish Railway Orchestra)
- "The Freaks Come Out at Night" – 2020 (as The Swedish Railway Orchestra)
- "What's Going On" – 2020 (as The Swedish Railway Orchestra)
- "Brendan Gleeson" – 2020 (as The Swedish Railway Orchestra)
- "Der Neonroom" – 2020 (as The Swedish Railway Orchestra)
- "There's Too Much Love" – 2020 (as The Swedish Railway Orchestra)
- "The Ballhaus" – 2022 (as The Swedish Railway Orchestra)
- "Fallen Devil" – 2022 (as The Swedish Railway Orchestra)
- "Go" – 2022 (as The Swedish Railway Orchestra)
- "Obelisco" – 2024 (as The Swedish Railway Orchestra)
- "Once Upon A Time In Palestine" – 2024 (as The Swedish Railway Orchestra)
- "Dead Man's Ghost" – 2026 (as The Swedish Railway Orchestra with Mike Garry)

== Bibliography ==
- Camp Nou: A very brief history on Europe's greatest football stadium – 2025
- Pure Bliss in La Boca: A History of Boca Juniors and the passion in La Bombonera – 2025
- Echoes from a God: Diego Maradona, the Manager and His Post-Playing Life – 2026
