= Halfset =

- Origin: Dublin
- Genres: electronica; post-rock
- Years active: 2005–2015
- Labels: Elusive Casino; Gravity
- Past members: Stephen Shannon; Jeff Martin; Sinead Nic Gearailt; Cillian McDonnell

Halfset were an Irish electronica/post-rock band based in Dublin.

== Career ==
Halfset's second album, Another Way of Being There (2008), was nominated for the Choice Music Prize, earning comparisons to Sigur Rós, Mogwai and Tortoise. Halfset performed at Electric Picnic 2009.

By 2015 the band had disbanded.

== Personnel ==
- Stephen Shannon (producer/engineer, laptop, bass)
- Jeff Martin (guitar, vocals)
- Sinéad Nic Gearailt (harp, Rhodes piano)
- Cillian McDonnell (drums)

== Discography ==
Albums

- Dramanalog (2005)
- Another Way of Being There (2008)
