= Palm Pictures =

US entertainment company

Coordinates: 40°44′27.446″N 74°0′7.627″W

- Industry: Distribution
- Founded: 1997
- Headquarters: United States
- Products: Films; Music; Home video
- Parent: Throwed Off Entertainment Group
- Website: www.palmpictures.com

Palm Pictures is an American entertainment company owned and run by founder Chris Blackwell. Palm Pictures produces, acquires, and distributes music and film projects with a particular focus on the DVD-Video format. Palm places an emphasis on such projects as music documentaries, arthouse, foreign cinema, and music videos. Palm Pictures' entertainment properties include a film division, a music label, sputnik7.com, epitonic.com, Arthouse Films, and RES Media Group, publisher of RES magazine.

Palm Pictures has its own customised content channel on Audiotube.

== Film titles ==
Films distributed by Palm Pictures include:

- 1 Giant Leap
- 13Tzameti
- 2 Sculptors
- 6ixtynin9
- American Mullet
- American Roots Music
- Arthouse
- The Basketball Diaries
- Be Here to Love Me
- The Believer
- Breaking News
- Bright Future
- Bomb the System
- Calvaire
- City of Men
- Clean
- Countryman
- The Criminal
- Cronicas
- Dancehall Queen
- Dark Days
- Demonlover
- Detonator DVD/music
- Dig!
- Director Label Series Box Set
- Director Label Series Box Set Vol. 2
- Dolls
- Edge City
- The Eye
- Fabulous Story of the Cuban Cigar
- Femi Kuti: Live at the Shrine
- The Flower of Evil
- Free Tibet
- Freestyle: The Art of Rhyme
- Fulltime Killer
- The Glamorous Life of Sachiko Hanai
- Gravesend
- Gunner Palace (documentary)
- The Heart is Deceitful Above All Things
- Henri Cartier-Bresson: The Impassioned Eye
- Hommage A' Noir
- The Housekeeper
- How to Draw A Bunny
- I'm Still Here Damn It!
- Invisible Waves
- JSA: Joint Security Area
- Kill Your Idols
- Last Life in the Universe
- The Last Minute
- The Legend of Leigh Bowery
- Live At the Royal Festival Hall
- Lower City
- Lucía y el sexo
- Man in the Sand
- Memories of Murder
- The Method
- El método
- Millennium Mambo
- Morvern Callar
- The Motel
- New York City Ballet: The Complete Workout
- New York City Ballet Workout
- New York City Ballet Workout Vol. 2
- New York, I Love You
- Noi
- The Nomi Song
- The Order From Matthew Barney's Cremaster 3
- Palm World Voices
- Palm World Voices: Africa
- Palm World Voices: Baaba Maal
- Palm World Voices: Mandela
- Palm World Voices: Spirit
- Palm World Voices: Vedic Path
- Paperboys
- Peter Beard: Scrapbooks from Africa and Beyond
- Purple Butterfly
- Rebel Music: The Bob Marley Story
- Reconstruction
- Revenge of The Robots
- The Rocket (Maurice Richard)
- Rolling Family
- Scratch
- Scratch Vs. Freestyle
- The Sea
- Six-String Samurai
- Spaceman
- Springtime in a Small Town
- Stoked: The Rise and Fall of Gator
- Strange Love Addiction
- Strip To the Bone
- Suck it and See
- Sun Dogs
- Superthruster
- Talamanam Sound Clash: Further Adventures in Hypercussion
- Talking Heads: Stop Making Sense
- Ten Canoes
- Thicker Than Water
- Time of the Wolf
- Tom Dowd and the Language of Music
- Ultraviolet
- We Run Tings, Tings Nuh Run We, a collection of three classic Jamaican island films: Dancehall Queen, Third World Cop, and Countryman.
- Who Gets to Call It Art?
- William Eggleston in the Real World
- Wondrous Oblivion
- The Work Of Director Anton Corbijn
- The Work Of Director Chris Cunningham
- The Work Of Director Jonathan Glazer
- The Work Of Director Mark Romanek
- The Work Of Director Michel Gondry
- The Work Of Director Spike Jonze
- The Work Of Director Stephane Sednaoui
- You're Gonna Miss Me

See also Directors Label.

== Music artists ==
Artists released/distributed by Palm Pictures include:

- 1 Giant Leap
- Angel Tech
- Baaba Maal
- Black Uhuru
- Burning Spear
- Cousteau
- Da Lata
- Dieselboy
- Earlimart
- Elwood
- Fozzy
- Gigi
- Guster
- The Heptones
- Honeydogs
- Bill Laswell
- Jacknife Lee
- Lake Trout
- Local H
- The Mad Capsule Markets
- Material
- Mocean Worker
- Moving Units
- Naked Funk
- Nortec Collective
- Ernest Ranglin
- Rearview Mirror
- Sidestepper
- Skindive
- Sly and Robbie
- Sparks
- Ned Sublette
- Supreme Beings of Leisure
- Tabla Beat Science
- Martina Topley-Bird
- Jah Wobble
- Zero 7 (US only)

== See also ==
- List of record labels
- List of jungle and drum n bass record labels
