= Sony Digital Audio Disc Corporation =

CD, DVD and Blu-ray disc manufacturing company

- Trade name: Sony DADC
- Type: Subsidiary
- Founded: 1983; 43 years ago
- Headquarters: 1800 N Fruitridge Ave, Terre Haute IN 47804, United States
- Parent: Sony Corporation of America
- Website: Official website

Sony Digital Audio Disc Corporation is a manufacturer of CDs, DVDs, UMDs, and Blu-ray Discs, operating numerous plants worldwide. While primarily serving Sony Music Entertainment-owned record labels, Sony Pictures Home Entertainment, and Sony Interactive Entertainment, it also produces discs for other labels, home entertainment distributors, and video game publishers.

== History ==
Sony DADC's first plant, located in Terre Haute, Indiana, opened on May 2, 1983, and produced its first CD, Bruce Springsteen's Born in the U.S.A., in September 1984. It was the first CD manufacturer in the United States and serves as the company's principal CD manufacturing facility and its research and development center.

The plant was initially a subsidiary of CBS/Sony Group, but Sony acquired CBS's stake in October 1985.

When Sony bought CBS Records in 1988, it acquired the company's manufacturing facilities, some of which later became part of Sony DADC. These included plants in Pitman, NJ (closed in 2011), Terre Haute, IN; Toronto, Ontario, Canada (closed in 2011); Mexico City (closed 2015); Salzburg, Austria; Mumbai, India; and Manaus, Brazil. These plants were originally manufacturers of vinyl gramophone records, later transitioning to CD manufacturing: Pitman in 1988, Manaus in 1992, and Toronto and Mexico City in 1994.

LaserDiscs, primarily 12-inch prints of feature films and concerts, were manufactured by Sony DADC in the 1980s and 1990s. Some of the laserdiscs made at DADC exhibit laser rot more than those from other manufacturers.

Sony DADC currently manufactures the majority of CDs sold in the United States. In November 2008, the company acquired the American disc-manufacturing capabilities of Glenayre Technologies, which manufactured discs for Universal Music Group. In the summer of 2009, the company assumed the physical distribution of EMI's North American operations. This left WEA as the only major label whose discs were not manufactured by the company, as its discs were manufactured by the operations of the former WEA Manufacturing that were sold to Cinram.

On August 8, 2011, a Sony DADC distribution center in Enfield was destroyed during the 2011 England riots. The warehouse was used by independent music distributor PIAS Entertainment Group to distribute CDs, LPs, and DVDs for over 100 European independent labels. The total stock loss in the fire was reported to be between 3.5 million and 25 million units.

On January 17, 2018, the DADC plant in Terre Haute, IN, announced the layoff of 375 employees, shifting US audio disc manufacturing to Sonopress. It was later determined that most audio discs would be manufactured by CDA Inc. Currently, the majority of audio discs manufactured for Universal Music Group US and Sony Music Entertainment US are produced by CDA Inc, while packaging and assembly into jewel cases are completed in the US. Technicolor (later Vantiva, now Conectiv) also sometimes assists in disc manufacturing for Universal Music Group US.

In April 2019, Sony DADC Japan Inc. was merged with Sony Music Communications, Inc. to become Sony Music Solutions, Inc., placing the Japanese DADC plants under Sony Music's control.

On January 13, 2022, the DADC plant in Terre Haute, IN, announced the layoff of 100 employees, moving US gaming and disc manufacturing capacity from Terre Haute to Salzburg, Austria. Assembly and distribution will remain in Terre Haute, IN. The Terre Haute plant eventually focused its manufacturing capacity towards medical devices, automotive parts, and other electronic devices.

On July 1, 2026, Sony Interactive Entertainment announced the planned discontinuation of physical media for its PlayStation consoles, to take place in January 2028 for any games released from that point onward. As a result, the DADC plants in Austria have begun repurposing their manufacturing capacity to focus on optical microlenses. At the time, DADC Austria's manufacturing of PlayStation games for North America and Europe accounted for half of the plant's daily manufacturing capacity of 600,000 discs, but it is now expected to be reduced to 10% of that capacity, in order to support reprinting of games released prior to the cutoff date.

== Manufacturing plants ==
Parent	Subsidiary	Location	Status
Sony Music Solutions, Inc. (formerly Sony DADC Japan Inc.)
Sony Music Solutions, Inc. (formerly Sony DADC Japan Inc.)	DADJ-Y (Yoshida)	Shizuoka	Operational
Sony Music Solutions, Inc. (formerly Sony DADC Japan Inc.)	DADJ-O (Oigawa)	Shizuoka	Operational
Sony Music Solutions, Inc. (formerly Sony DADC Japan Inc.)	DADJ-I (Ibaraki)	Ibaraki	Operational
Sony DADC Americas
Sony DADC Americas	Sony DADC US Inc.	Pitman, NJ	Shut down (2011)
Sony DADC Americas	Sony DADC US Inc.	Terre Haute, IN	Operational
Sony DADC Americas	Sony DADC Americas Distribution	Bolingbrook, IL	Shut down (2021)
Sony DADC Americas	Sony DADC Canada Co.	Toronto	Shut down (2011)
Sony DADC Americas	Sony DADC Brasil Industria, Comercio e Distribuicao Video-Fonografica Ltda.	Manaus	Shut down (2018)
Sony DADC México S.A. de C.V	Sony DADC México	Mexico City	Shut down (2015)
Sony DADC International
Sony DADC International	Sony DADC Europe GmbH (formerly Sony DADC Europe Limited, Zweigniederlassung Österreich)	Thalgau	Operational
Sony DADC International	Sony DADC Europe GmbH (formerly Sony DADC Europe Limited, Zweigniederlassung Österreich)	Anif	Shut down (2019)
Sony DADC International	Sony DADC Europe GmbH (formerly Sony DADC Europe Limited, Zweigniederlassung Österreich)	Salzburg	Operational
Sony DADC International	Sony DADC UK Limited (formerly Sony DADC Europe Limited)	Southwater	Shut down (2018); Re-opened (2020)
Sony DADC International	Sony DADC UK Limited (formerly Sony DADC Europe Limited)	Enfield	Shut down (2020)
Sony DADC International	Sony DADC UK Limited (formerly Sony DADC Europe Limited)	Derry Street	Shut down (2020)
Sony DADC International	Sony DADC UK Limited (formerly Sony DADC Europe Limited)	Rathbone Place	Shut down (2015)
Sony DADC International	Sony DADC UK Limited (formerly Sony DADC Europe Limited)	Market Place	Shut down (2013)
Sony DADC International	Sony DADC France S.A.S.	Paris	Operational
Sony DADC International	Sony DADC Iberia S.L.	Alcorcón	Shut down (2021)
Sony DADC International	Sony DADC Czech Republic s.r.o.	Úherce	Shut down (2022)
Sony DADC International	Sony DADC Czech Republic s.r.o.	Prague	Operational
Sony DADC International	Sony DADC Czech Republic s.r.o.	Plzeň	Operational
Sony DADC International	Sony DADC Czech Republic s.r.o.	Štěnovice	Operational
Sony DADC International	OOO Sony DADC Russia	Borovsk	Shut down (2020)
Sony DADC International	Sony DADC Manufacturing India Pvt. Ltd.	Mumbai	Shut down (2016)
Sony DADC International	Entertainment Network Scandinavia AB	Borås	Operational
Sony DADC International	Sony DADC China Co. Ltd.	Shanghai	Non-Operational Holding Co.
Sony DADC International	Shanghai Epic Music Entertainment Company Ltd.	Shanghai	Operational
Sony DADC International	Sony DADC Hong Kong Ltd.	Hong Kong	Shut down (2015)
Sony DADC International	Sony DADC Australia Pty Ltd.	Eastern Creek, NSW	Operational
Sony DADC International	Sony DADC Australia Pty Ltd.	Erskine Park, NSW	Operational
Sony DADC International	Sony DADC Australia Pty Ltd.	Huntingwood, NSW	Shut down (2018)

== Manufacturing codes ==
Printed on the discs or packaging of Sony DADC-manufactured CDs are codes indicating master copies (matrix numbers) of discs. These codes begin with a 4-letter prefix followed by a series of digits. Common prefixes include the following:

- DIDC – Classical recordings released on Sony-affiliated record labels.
- DIDP – Popular (i.e., non-classical) recordings released on Sony-affiliated record labels.
- DIDX – Recordings pressed by DADC for release on non-Sony-affiliated record labels.
- DIDY – Recordings pressed by the US division of DADC for the Columbia House Record Club.
- DIDZ – Recordings released on WEA Japan (only used from 1983 to 1985).
- CDRM - CD-ROM titles
- LDVS - Standard Laserdiscs
- LDTA - THX & AC-3 Laserdiscs
- LDTX - THX Laserdiscs
- LDAC - AC-3 Laserdiscs
- DVSS - Single-layer DVDs
- DVDL - Dual-layer DVDs
- DDLD - "CD" side of DualDiscs
- DDHD - DVD side of DualDiscs
- AULD - "CD" side of DualDiscs containing DVD-Audio
- AUHD - DVD side of DualDiscs containing DVD-Audio
- SUSS - Single-layer Super Audio CDs
- SUDL - Dual-layer Super Audio CDs
- STLD or SULD - CD layer of hybrid Super Audio CDs
- SUHD - Super Audio CD layer of hybrid Super Audio CDs
- BVSS - Single-layer Blu-ray Discs
- BVDL - Dual-layer Blu-ray Discs
- BHSS - Single-layer Hybrid Blu-ray Discs (discs containing both Blu-ray video and PlayStation 3 format software)
- BHDL - Dual-layer Hybrid Blu-ray Discs (discs containing both Blu-ray video and PlayStation 3 format software)
- USDL - Dual-layer Ultra HD Blu-ray Discs
- USTL - Triple-layer Ultra HD Blu-ray discs
- DRSS - DVD-ROM software titles
- PSRM - PlayStation titles
- PTRM - PlayStation 2 CD-ROM titles
- PDSS - PlayStation 2 DVD-ROM titles
- PDDL - PlayStation 2 DVD-ROM Dual-layer titles
- UPSS - PlayStation Portable UMD Single-layer titles
- UPDL - PlayStation Portable UMD Dual-layer titles
- BPSS - PlayStation 3 Blu-ray Disc Single-layer titles
- BPDL - PlayStation 3 Blu-ray Disc Dual-layer titles
- B4SS - PlayStation 4 Blu-ray Disc Single-layer titles
- B4DL - PlayStation 4 Blu-ray Disc Dual-layer titles
- P5DL - PlayStation 5 Blu-ray Disc Dual-layer titles
- P5TL - PlayStation 5 Blu-ray Disc Triple-layer titles

== See also ==
- WEA Manufacturing
