= Entertainment Distribution Company =

Defunct American packaged CD and DVD manufacturing company

- Formerly: Glenayre Technologies
- Company type: Public company
- Traded as: Formerly Nasdaq: EDCI
- Industry: Mass Media
- Founded: 1987
- Defunct: June 2017
- Fate: Insolvent
- Headquarters: New York City, United States
- Area served: Europe and America
- Products: Packaging media onto CDs and DVDs and distribution
- Subsidiaries: EDC UK; EDC GmbH (Germany); UML France
- Website: www.edcllc.com Archived July 27, 2011, at the Wayback Machine

Entertainment Distribution Company (EDC) was an American company that manufactured pre-recorded CDs, DVDs, Blu-rays and vinyl records and distributed them for music and movie companies.

It was created by consolidating the disc-manufacturing capabilities from a number of different companies in particular Universal Music Group’s British, German, and American optical disc-manufacturing capabilities (Universal Media & Logistics (UML), formerly PolyGram Manufacturing & Distribution Centers Inc.

The move to internet downloads and subsequently streaming of media saw the decline in the business through the 2000s. The company attempted to consolidate and integrate its manufacturing operations and moved operations to Germany as well as sell of parts of the business to reduce costs. Despite this the company became insolvent and its assets were auctioned in May and June 2017.

== History ==
The company operated a distribution center to which Universal Music Group’s British, German, and American optical disc-manufacturing capabilities (Universal Media & Logistics (UML), formerly PolyGram Manufacturing & Distribution Centers Inc. (PMDC)) were sold during 2004. The company's previous name was Glenayre Technologies. UML France was sold to Cinram earlier.

Entertainment Distribution Company provided supply chain services to music, movies, and gaming companies. In November 2008, its American optical disc-manufacturing operation was sold to Sony DADC for US$26 million.
