= YouTube Premium =

Paid streaming subscription service

- Formerly: Music Key (2014–15); YouTube Red (2015–18)
- Type: Subscription service
- Industry: Internet
- Founded: November 14, 2014; 12 years ago
- Headquarters: 901 Cherry Avenue; San Bruno, California, United States
- Area served: 119 countries and territories; mostly in the Americas, Europe and Oceania, and in parts of Africa and Asia (see full list)
- Members: 125 million (as of March 2025)
- Parent: YouTube
- Website: youtube.com/premium

YouTube Premium (formerly Music Key and YouTube Red) is a subscription service offered by the American video platform YouTube. The service provides ad-free access to content across the service, as well as access to exclusive YouTube Originals programming produced in collaboration with the site's creators, ability to download videos and listen background playback of videos on mobile devices, and access to the music streaming service, YouTube Music, along with other benefits. It has over 125 million subscribers.

The service was launched on November 14, 2014, as Music Key, offering advertisement-free streaming of music videos from participating labels on YouTube and Google Play Music. The service was then revised and relaunched as YouTube Red on October 21, 2015, expanding its scope to offer advertisement-free access to all YouTube videos, as opposed to just music.

YouTube announced the rebranding of the service as YouTube Premium on May 17, 2018, alongside the return of YouTube Music as a separate subscription service. Later in the year, it was reported that YouTube was planning to make some of the original content associated with the service available on an ad-supported basis.

== History ==
=== Music Key ===
The service was first unveiled in November 2014 as Music Key, serving as a collaboration between YouTube and Google Play Music, and meant to succeed the latter's own "All Access" service. Music Key offered ad-free playback of music videos from participating labels hosted on YouTube, as well as background and offline playback of music videos on mobile devices from within the YouTube app. The service also included access to Google Play Music All Access, which provides ad-free audio streaming of a library of music. Alongside Music Key, Google also introduced tighter integration between Play Music and YouTube's apps, including the sharing of music recommendations, and access to YouTube's music videos from within the Play Music app. Music Key was not YouTube's first foray into premium content, having launched film rentals in 2010, and premium, subscription-based channels in 2013.

During its invite-only beta, Music Key faced mixed reception due to the limited scope of the offering; YouTube's chief business officer Robert Kyncl explained that his daughter was confused over why videos of songs from Frozen were not "music" in the scope of the service, and thus not advertisement-free. These concerns and others led to a revamping of the Music Key concept to create YouTube Red.

=== YouTube Red ===
YouTube Red's logo between 2017 and 2018

YouTube Red was officially unveiled on October 21, 2015. Unlike Music Key, YouTube Red was designed to provide ad-free streaming to all videos, rather than just music content. This shift required YouTube to seek permission from its content creators and rights holders to allow their content to be part of the ad-free service; under the new contract terms, partners would receive a share of the total revenue from YouTube Red subscriptions, as determined by how much their content is viewed by subscribers.

YouTube also sought to compete against sites such as Netflix, Amazon Prime Video and Hulu by offering original content (YouTube Originals) as part of the subscription service, leveraging prominent YouTube personalities in combination with professional producers. Robert Kyncl acknowledged that many of YouTube's prominent personalities had built their followings and created content while operating on a "shoestring budget", but he maintained that "in order to scale up, it takes a different kind of enterprise, a different kind of skill set" such as story-telling and "showrunning". Prominent YouTube personality PewDiePie, who was involved in one of the planned originals for the service, explained that the service was meant to mitigate profit loss from the use of ad blocking.

On May 18, 2016, YouTube Red and YouTube Music launched in Australia and New Zealand, the first countries to gain access to the service outside the United States. On August 3, 2016, YouTube Red support was added to the YouTube Kids app. On December 6, 2016, YouTube Red expanded to South Korea.

=== As YouTube Premium ===
On June 18, 2018, YouTube rebranded the service as YouTube Premium. The price of the service also changed from US$9.99 to US$11.99 per month for new subscribers. The existing pricing, as well as bundling of YouTube Premium with Google Play Music, was grandfathered in some countries for those who subscribed prior to the rebranding. Alongside the rebranding, the service also expanded into Canada, and 11 European countries (Austria, Finland, France, Germany, Ireland, Italy, Norway, Russia, Spain, Sweden and the United Kingdom).

The rebranding came alongside the re-launch of YouTube Music as a music streaming service, which reintroduced a music-oriented subscription option (YouTube Music Premium) slotted below YouTube Premium at a US$9.99 pricing, competing primarily with Apple Music and Spotify. The rebranding also came amid internal concerns that the previous "YouTube Red" name could be confused with internet pornography website RedTube.

By July 2019, YouTube Premium and YouTube Music Premium were available in approximately 60 countries and territories with a subscription price difference. On April 20, 2020, support was added for Unified Payments Interface for subscribers in India.

In August 2021, YouTube began piloting a second subscription tier, "YouTube Premium Lite" in European markets such as Belgium, Denmark, Finland, Luxembourg, Norway and Sweden, at a price point of €6.99. It contained only the ad-free viewing benefit. YouTube discontinued the Premium Lite plan in October 2023.

In September 2022, YouTube tested paywalling 4K resolution streaming of any YouTube video behind YouTube Premium. Amid criticism, this pilot ended in mid-October 2022. In April 2023, YouTube began to pilot a variant of this concept under which some videos offer an enhanced bitrate 1080p option.

As of July 2023, in the United States the price of individual accounts on the service was increased to $13.99 per month ($18.99 if purchased via Apple App Store)

In July 2026, NBCUniversal announced that its competing service Peacock would be integrated into YouTube Premium for U.S. subscribers at no additional charge beginning in 2027, including its original and library content, and live sporting events from NBC Sports (including, most prominently, its rights to the Olympic Games, NFL, NBA, and Major League Baseball among others). As part of the pact, NBCU also renewed the carriage agreement for its networks with YouTube TV, and YouTube will subcontract NBC Sports to produce selected sports broadcasts by the platform. The agreement comes ahead of plans by parent company Comcast to divest NBCUniversal as a separate company.

== Features ==
A YouTube Premium subscription allows users to watch videos on YouTube without advertisements across the website and its mobile apps, including the dedicated YouTube Music and YouTube Kids apps and services. Through the apps, users can also save videos to their device for offline viewing, play their audio in the background, and in picture-in-picture mode on Android Oreo and newer. YouTube Premium also offers original content that is exclusive to subscribers, which is created and published by YouTube's largest creators.

== Content ==
YouTube Premium offers original films and series produced in collaboration with professional studios and YouTube personalities, under the banner YouTube Originals. For multi-episode series, the first episode of a YouTube Originals series is available free. In selected countries where the service is not yet available, individual episodes can also be purchased through YouTube or Google TV. Access to YouTube Originals is also included in YouTube's separate streaming television service YouTube TV, but a YouTube Premium subscription is still required for the service's other benefits.

In November 2018, it was reported that YouTube was planning to offer some of its premium shows available for free on an ad-supported basis by 2020. The Premium subscription would still cover ad-free access, timed exclusivity windows for original content, and content that is not made freely available. YouTube significantly scaled back its YouTube Originals program in January 2022.

== Reception ==
Reception to YouTube Premium has been mixed amongst consumers and journalists alike. David Nield of Wired argues that the premium service is worth it for consumers, saying that in addition to including a music streaming service, the lack of ads, the ability to download videos, and being able to play videos in the background are useful features. In addition, Nield praised YouTube Premium's inclusion of features under development, citing the ability to pinch to zoom in videos as a standout example. Ashley Maready of The Motley Fool concurred with Nield in her review, while additionally noting that the benefits also extended out to YouTube Kids.

Adamya Sharma of Android Authority argued that the service is only worth it for avid YouTube viewers, and that a YouTube Premium subscription would not be worth it if the user did not use all of its features. Additionally, Sharma strongly criticized the manner in which YouTube nagged its viewers to subscribe to Premium, and claimed that its attempts have driven users to competitor TikTok.

In February 2024, YouTube Premium passed 100 million subscribers.

=== Licensing terms for channels ===
In May 2014, prior to the official unveiling of the Music Key service, the independent music trade organization Worldwide Independent Network alleged that YouTube was using non-negotiable contracts with independent labels that were "undervalued" in comparison to other streaming services, and stated that YouTube threatened to block a label's videos from public access if they did not agree to the new terms. In a statement to the Financial Times in June 2014, Robert Kyncl confirmed that these measures were "to ensure that all content on the platform is governed by its new contractual terms". Stating that 90% of labels had reached deals, he went on to say that "while we wish that we had [a] 100% success rate, we understand that is not likely an achievable goal and therefore it is our responsibility to our users and the industry to launch the enhanced music experience". The Financial Times later reported that YouTube had reached an aggregate deal with Merlin Network—a trade group representing over 20,000 independent labels, for their inclusion in the service. However, YouTube itself has not confirmed the deal.

Following the unveiling of YouTube Red, it was stated that these same contractual requirements would now apply to all YouTube Partner Program members; partners who do not accept the new terms and revenue sharing agreements related to the YouTube Red service will have their videos blocked entirely in regions where YouTube Red is available. The YouTube channels of ESPN were a notable party affected by the change; a representative of ESPN's parent, The Walt Disney Company, stated that conflicts with third-party rights holders in regard to sports footage contained in ESPN's YouTube videos prevented them from being offered under the new terms. A limited number of older videos remain on ESPN's main channel.

Similarly, a large amount of content licensed by Japanese record labels became unavailable in regions where YouTube Red is available. It was believed that the ability to download videos for offline viewing in YouTube Red was a subject of hesitation for Japanese media companies due to the need to monitor when, where, and how content is being used in accordance with Japanese copyright laws, hence their content was blocked under the new requirements.

== Geographic availability ==
As of March 2024, YouTube Premium is available in most of the Americas, Europe and Oceania, as well as parts of Africa and Asia, with a total availability in 119 markets. Following the Russian invasion of Ukraine, Google indefinitely suspended all of its all payment and subscription-based services in the country, including YouTube Premium.

Countries where YouTube Premium is available (as of March 2024)

History of expansion
As Music Key
Date	Countries/regions	Ref.
November 14, 2014	United States	
As YouTube Red
Date	Countries/regions	Ref.
October 21, 2015	United States	
May 18, 2016	Australia; New Zealand	
December 6, 2016	South Korea	
As YouTube Premium
Date	Countries/regions	Ref.
May 22, 2018	Australia (Note: Two-person plan available); Mexico (Note: Annual plans available); New Zealand; South Korea (Note: Paid memberships only) (Note: Family and student plans unavailable); United States (Note: Annual plans available)	
June 18, 2018	Austria; Canada (Note: Annual plans available); Finland; France (Note: Two-person plan available); Germany (Note: Annual plans available); (Republic of Ireland) Ireland; Italy; Norway; ~~Russia~~ (Note: Suspended on March 10, 2022 until further notice); Spain; Sweden; United Kingdom	
August 29, 2018	Belgium; Netherlands; Denmark; Luxembourg	
September 26, 2018	Brazil (Note: Annual plans available)	
November 14, 2018	Chile; Colombia; Japan (Note: Annual plans available); Peru; Portugal; Switzerland; Ukraine	
March 13, 2019	Argentina (Note: Two-person plan available); Bolivia; Costa Rica; Dominican Republic; Ecuador; El Salvador; Guatemala; Honduras; India (Note: Annual plans available) (Note: Two-person plan available); Nicaragua; Panama; Paraguay; South Africa; Uruguay	
May 16, 2019	Bulgaria; Cyprus; Czech Republic; Hungary; North Macedonia; Poland; Romania	
July 17, 2019	(Bosnia and Herzegovina) Bosnia & Herzegovina; Croatia; Estonia; Greece; Iceland (Note: Family and student plans unavailable); Latvia; Liechtenstein; Lithuania; Malta; Serbia; Slovakia; Slovenia (Note: Family and student plans unavailable); Turkey (Note: Annual plans available)	
September 11, 2019	Bahrain; Israel; Kuwait; Lebanon; Oman; Qatar; Saudi Arabia; United Arab Emirates	
November 6, 2019	Hong Kong (Note: Two-person plan available); Indonesia; Malaysia; Philippines; Singapore; Taiwan (Note: Two-person plan available); Thailand (Note: Annual plans available)	
March 10, 2020	Nigeria; Turks and Caicos Islands; Venezuela (Note: Family and student plans unavailable)	
June 10, 2020	American Samoa; Aruba; Belarus (Note: Family and student plans unavailable); Bermuda; Cayman Islands; Egypt; French Guiana; French Polynesia; Guadeloupe; Guam; Northern Mariana Islands; Papua New Guinea; Puerto Rico; (United States Virgin Islands) U.S. Virgin Islands	
April 12, 2023	Vietnam	
August 2, 2023	Bangladesh (Note: Two-person plan available); Nepal (Note: Two-person plan available); Pakistan; Sri Lanka	
December 5, 2023	Algeria; Cambodia (Note: Two-person plan available); (Georgia (country)) Georgia; Ghana; Iraq; Jordan; Kenya; Laos (Note: Two-person plan available); Senegal; Tunisia	
March 14, 2024	Azerbaijan; Jamaica; Kazakhstan; Libya; Morocco; Réunion; Tanzania; Uganda; Yemen; Zimbabwe	

== See also ==
- Subscription video on demand
- List of streaming media services
