= Warner Music Group =

American multinational entertainment and record label conglomerate

Warner Music Group Corp.
- Logo used since November 2021

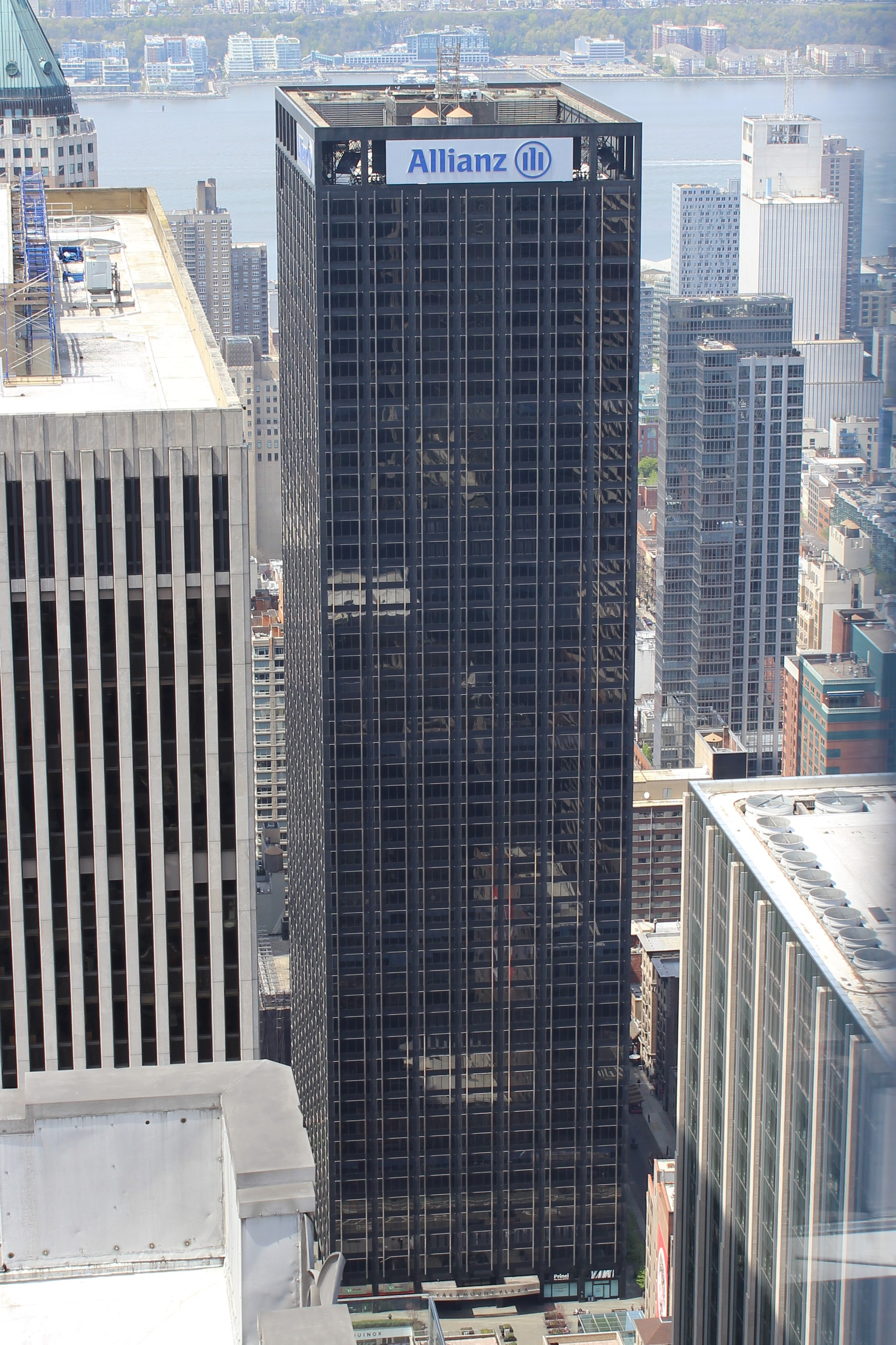
- Headquarters in 1633 Broadway, New York City
- Trade name: Warner Music Group
- Formerly: Warner Bros. Records (1958–1967, 1970–1971); Warner Bros.-Seven Arts Records (1967–1970); Kinney Record Group International (1970–1972); Warner-Elektra-Atlantic (1972–1991); Warner Music (1991–2001) (Note: Since 2001, the "Warner Music" name is used for Warner Music Group outside the United States.)
- Type: Public
- Traded as: Nasdaq: WMG (Class A); S&P 400 component; NYSE: WMG (2004–2011)
- ISIN: US9345502036
- Industry: Music; Entertainment
- Founded: April 6, 1958; 68 years ago
- Founder: Warner Bros. Pictures at the direction of Jack L. Warner
- Headquarters: 1633 Broadway, New York City, U.S.
- Area served: Worldwide (except for Russia & Belarus)
- Key people: Michael Lynton (chairman); Len Blavatnik (vice chairman); Robert Kyncl (CEO)
- Revenue: ▲US$6.71 billion (2025)
- Operating income: ▼US$694 million (2025)
- Net income: ▼US$365 million (2025)
- Total assets: ▲US$9.82 billion (2025)
- Total equity: ▲US$647 million (2025)
- Owner: Access Industries (72% equity; 98% voting)
- Number of employees: 5,500 (2025)
- Parent: Kinney National Company (1969–1972); Warner Communications (1972–1990); Time Warner (1990–2004)
- Divisions: List of Warner Music Group labels
- Subsidiaries: Arts Music, Inc.; Alternative Distribution Alliance; Warner Chappell Music; 615 Music; Warner Records; Warner Classics; WEA International; IMGN Media
- Website: wmg.com
- Footnotes; Financials as of September 30, 2025. References

Warner Music Group Corp., commonly abbreviated as WMG, is an American multinational entertainment and record label conglomerate headquartered in New York City. It is one of the "Big Four" recording companies and the third-largest in the global music industry, after Universal Music Group, Sony Music Group and BMG Rights Management.

Formerly owned by Time Warner, the company sold WMG in 2004 to a group of private investors led by Edgar Bronfman Jr., in a move to alleviate Time Warner's debt load related to its merger with AOL. WMG was publicly traded on the New York Stock Exchange from 2005 until 2011, when it announced its privatization and sale to Access Industries. It later had its second IPO on Nasdaq in 2020, once again becoming a public company. As of 2025, Access Industries remains the company's largest shareholder, owning 72% of the equity and controlling 98% of the voting power. With a multibillion-dollar annual turnover, WMG employs more than 4,500 people and has operations in more than 50 countries throughout the world. The company owns and operates some of the largest and most successful record labels in the world, including Elektra, Reprise, Sire, Warner (formerly known as Warner Bros.), Parlophone (formerly owned by EMI), and Atlantic. WMG also owns Warner Chappell Music, one of the world's largest music publishers.

== History ==
Evolution of Warner Music Group
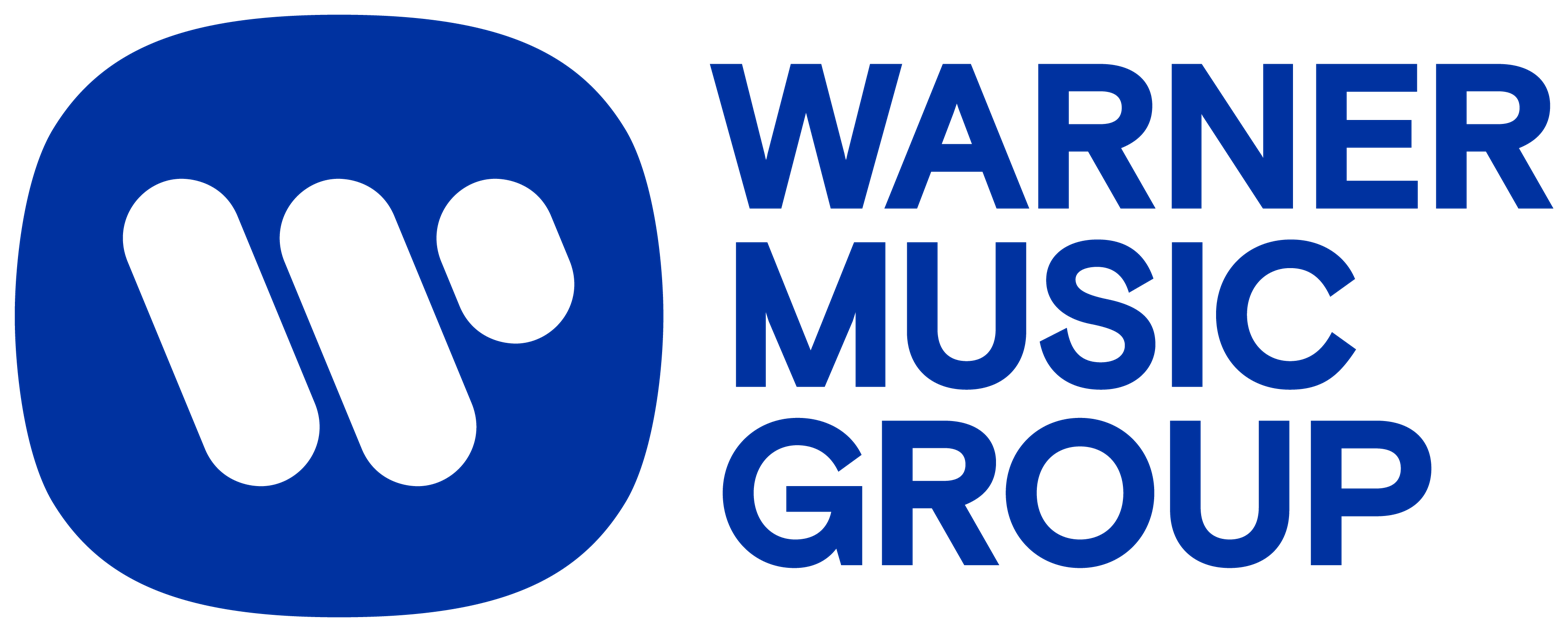
- 1928: By the end of the Silent Era, Jack Warner established a short-lived company called Music Publishers Holdings to oversee song rights for Warner Bros. films
- 1958: Nearly thirty years later, Warner Bros. returned to the music business with the creation of Warner Bros. Records to ensure its musicians were contracted
- 1963: Warner Records acquired Frank Sinatra's Reprise Records, and the labels were consolidated as Warner/Reprise
- 1967: After Jack Warner sold his company, Warner Bros.-Seven Arts was formed; and it acquired Atlantic Records and established Warner Music Canada
- 1968: Warner Bros.-Seven Arts Records, the rebranded Warner/Reprise, would lay the foundation for shared music distribution
- 1970: Kinney National Company acquired Elektra Records several months after buying Warner Bros., and established Kinney Record Group International
- 1971: Warner Music Group was established in its modern form with the separate Warner-Elektra-Atlantic labels being brought under one distribution network
- 1972: Kinney divested its non-media assets into a separate company and renamed itself Warner Communications; it also purchased Asylum Records
- 1978: WEA Manufacturing was created to develop vinyl records and cassettes
- 1981: MTV was launched by Warner-Amex and it quickly became popular from songs by Warner-Elektra-Atlantic musicians
- 1987: Warner Chappell Music became Warner's music publisher after Chappell was acquired from PolyGram N.V.
- 1988: Warner's international music footprint expanded with the purchase of the German record label, Teldec, and by 1991, Warner Classics was established
- 1990: Time Warner became the new parent company of Warner Music Group, and Warner Music Vision was formed as its primary music video distributor
- 1995: Controversy with Interscope Records led to changes at the corporate level; several long-time music execs departed, such as Mo Ostin, Mike Fuchs, and Doug Morris
- 2003: Edgar Bronfman Jr. led investors to acquire Warner Music from Time Warner, and he would serve as the company's CEO until 2011, overseeing its IPO
- 2011: Access Industries, an investment firm acquired Warner Music Group from the Bronfman Family and took it private
- 2013: Universal sold Parlophone Label Group to Warner to gain antitrust approval for its purchase of the EMI Group Limited
- 2019: Warner Bros. Records is renamed to Warner Records due to the expiration of its license to use the Warner Bros. logo
- 2020: Warner Music once again becomes a public company, with Access Industries remaining its controlling shareholder

=== 1950s and 1960s ===
The film studio Warner Bros. had no record label division at the time one of its contracted actors, Tab Hunter, scored a No. 1 hit song in 1957 for Dot Records, a division of rival Paramount Pictures. In order to prevent any repetition of its actors recording for rival companies, and to also capitalize on the music business, Warner Bros. Records was created in 1958; its original office was located above the film studio's machine shop on 3701 Warner Boulevard in Burbank, California. In 1963, Warner purchased Reprise Records, which had been founded by Frank Sinatra three years earlier so that he could have more creative control over his recordings. With the Reprise acquisition, Warner gained the services of Mo Ostin, who was mainly responsible for the success of Warner/Reprise.

After Warner Bros. was sold to Seven Arts Productions in 1967 (forming Warner Bros.-Seven Arts), it purchased Atlantic Records, founded in 1947 and WMG's oldest label (until WMG completed its acquisition of Parlophone in 2013), as well as its subsidiary Atco Records. This acquisition brought Neil Young into the company fold, initially as a member of Buffalo Springfield. Young became one of Warner's longest-established artists, recording both as a solo artist and with groups under the Warner-owned Atlantic, Atco, and Reprise labels. Young also recorded five albums for Geffen Records during that label's period of Warner distribution. The Geffen catalogue, now owned by Universal Music Group, represents Young's only major recordings not under WMG ownership.

Atlantic, its subsidiary Atco Records, and its affiliate Stax Records paved the way for Warner's rise to industry prominence. The purchase brought in Atlantic's lucrative back catalogue, which included classic recordings by Ray Charles, the Drifters, the Coasters, and many more. In the mid-1960s, Atlantic/Stax released a string of landmark soul music recordings by artists including Booker T & the MGs, Sam & Dave, Wilson Pickett, Otis Redding, Ben E. King, and Aretha Franklin. Ultimately, the sale led to Stax leaving Atlantic because Seven Arts Productions insisted on keeping the rights to Stax recordings. Atlantic moved decisively into rock and pop in the late 1960s and 1970s, signing major British and American acts including Led Zeppelin, Cream, Crosby Stills & Nash, Yes, Emerson, Lake & Palmer, Genesis, Average White Band, Dr. John, King Crimson, Bette Midler, Roxy Music, and Foreigner.

An earlier attempt by Warner Bros. Records to create an in-house distribution arm in 1958 did not materialize. So in 1969, Elektra Records boss Jac Holzman approached Atlantic's Jerry Wexler with the idea of setting up a joint distribution network for Warner, Elektra, and Atlantic. An experimental branch was established in Southern California as a possible prototype for an expanded operation.

==== Atlantic exerts autonomy ====
It was soon apparent in 1969 that Atlantic/Atco president Ahmet Ertegun viewed Warner/Reprise president Mike Maitland as a rival. Maitland believed that, as vice-president in charge of the Warner Bros.-Seven Arts music division, he should have final say over all recording operations, and he further angered Ertegun by proposing that most of Atlantic's back-office functions (such as marketing and distribution) be combined with the existing departments at Warner/Reprise. In retrospect Ertegun clearly feared that Maitland would ultimately have more power than him, and so he moved rapidly to secure his own position and remove Maitland. Maitland had put off renegotiating the contracts of Joe Smith and Mo Ostin, the presidents of the Warner Bros. and Reprise labels, and this provided Ertegun with an effective means of undermining Maitland. When Wexler—now a major shareholder—found out about the contract issue he and Ertegun began pressuring Eliot Hyman to get Smith and Ostin under contract, ostensibly because they were worried that the two executives might move to rival labels—and in fact Ostin had received overtures from both MGM Records and ABC Records.

In 1969, the wisdom of Hyman's investments was proved when Kinney National Company purchased Warner Bros.-Seven Arts for $400 million, more than eight times what Hyman had paid for Warner/Reprise and Atlantic combined. Several months later, Kinney National Company reverted Warner Bros.-Seven Arts to its original name of "Warner Bros". From the base of his family's funeral parlour business, Kinney president Steve Ross had rapidly built the Kinney company into a profitable conglomerate with interests that included comic publishing, the Ashley-Famous talent agency, parking lots and cleaning services. Following the takeover, Warners' music group briefly adopted the 'umbrella' name Kinney Music, because U.S. anti-trust laws at the time prevented the three labels from trading as one. Ross was primarily focused on rebuilding the company's ailing movie division and was happy to defer to the advice of the managers of the company's record labels, since he knew that they were generating most of the group's profits. Ertegun's campaign against Maitland began in earnest that summer. Atlantic had agreed to help Warner Bros. in its efforts to establish its labels overseas, beginning with its soon-to-be-established Warner Bros. subsidiary in Australia, but when Warner executive Phil Rose arrived in Australia, he discovered that just one week earlier Atlantic had signed a new four-year distribution deal with a rival local label, Festival Records (owned by Rupert Murdoch's News Limited).

Mike Maitland complained bitterly to Kinney executive Ted Ashley, but to no avail – by this time Ertegun was poised to make his move against Maitland. As he had with Hyman, Ertegun urged Steve Ross to extend Mo Ostin and Joe Smith's contracts, a recommendation Ross was happy to accept. Ostin however had received overtures from other companies (including the aforementioned offers from MGM and ABC) and when he met with Ertegun in January 1970 and was offered Maitland's job, he was unwilling to re-sign immediately. In response, Ertegun broadly hinted that Maitland's days were numbered and that he, Ertegun, was about to take over the recording division. Unlike the Warner/Reprise executives, Atlantic's execs the Ertegun brothers (Ahmet and Neshui) and Wexler owned stock in Kinney.

Ostin was understandably concerned that, if he accepted the position, the Warner Bros. staff would feel that he had stabbed Maitland in the back, but his attorney convinced him that Maitland's departure was inevitable, regardless of whether or not he accepted the post (succinctly advising him, "Don't be a schmuck"). On Sunday January 25, Ted Ashley went to Maitland's house to tell him he had been dismissed, and Maitland declined the offer of a job at the movie studio. One week later, Mo Ostin was named as the new President of Warner Bros. Records, with Joe Smith as his executive vice-president. Ertegun nominally remained the head of Atlantic, but since both Ostin and Smith owed their new positions to him, Ertegun was now the de facto head of the Warner music division. Ertegun was given the formal title of executive vice-president-Music Group. Maitland moved to MCA Records later that year and successfully consolidated MCA's labels, which he couldn't do at Warner.

=== 1970s ===
During the 1970s, the Kinney group built up a commanding position in the music industry. In 1970, Kinney bought Elektra Records and its sister label Nonesuch Records (founded by Jac Holzman in 1950) for $10 million, bringing in leading rock acts, including the Doors, Tim Buckley, and Love, and its historically significant folk archive, along with the successful budget Western classical-music label Nonesuch Records.

The purchase of Elektra-Nonesuch brought a rich back catalogue of folk music as well as the renowned Nonesuch catalogue of classical and world music. Elektra founder Jac Holzman ran the label under Warners for two years, but by that time, he was by his own admission "burnt out" after twenty years in the business. Kinney president Steve Ross subsequently appointed Holzman as part of a seven-person "brain trust" tasked with investigating opportunities presented by new technologies, a role Holzman was eager to accept. The same year, the group established its first overseas offices in Canada and Australia. By that time the "Seven Arts" moniker was dropped from the Warner Bros. name. Warner Bros. also founded the Casablanca Records subsidiary, headed by Neil Bogart; but several years later Casablanca became independent from Warner Bros.

==== Warner-Elektra-Atlantic and worldwide distribution ====
With the Elektra acquisition, the next step was forming an in-house distribution arm for the co-owned labels. By this time, Warner-Reprise's frustrations with its current distributors had reached breaking point; Joe Smith (then executive vice-president of Warner Bros.) recalled that the Grateful Dead were becoming a major act but the distributor was constantly out of stock of their albums. These circumstances facilitated the full establishment of the group's in-house distribution arm, initially called Kinney Record Group International. By late 1972, US anti-trust laws had changed and the company was renamed Warner-Elektra-Atlantic, WEA for short, which was renamed Warner Music in 1991 (the word "group" was added after the formation of AOL Time Warner in 2001).

WEA was an early champion of heavy metal rock music. Several such bands, including three major British pioneers Led Zeppelin, Black Sabbath, and Deep Purple, were all signed to WEA's labels, at least in the United States. Among the earliest American metal acts to be signed to WEA were Alice Cooper, Montrose, and Van Halen.

Up to this point the Kinney-owned record companies had relied on licensing deals with overseas record labels to manufacture, distribute and promote its products in other countries; concurrent with the establishment of its new distribution arm, the company now began establishing subsidiaries in the other major markets, beginning with the creation of Warner Bros. Records Australia in 1970, soon followed by branch offices in the UK, Europe and Japan. In July 1971, the new in-house distribution company was incorporated as Warner-Elektra-Atlantic Distributing Corp. (WEA) and branch offices were established in eight major US cities; Joel Friedman a one-time Billboard writer who had been the head of Warner's advertising/merchandising division in its early years, was appointed to head WEA's US domestic division, and Ahmet Ertegun's brother Nesuhi was appointed to oversee its international operations. Neshui Ertegun, originally a Turkish native like his brother, displayed a global perspective and independence from its U.S. counterpart by successfully promoting international acts in their target markets worldwide. Ertegun headed WEA International until his retirement in 1987. A de facto committee of three senior marketing executives—Dave Glew from Atlantic, Ed Rosenblatt from Warner Bros. and Mel Posner from Elektra—oversaw the integration of each label's marketing and distribution through the new division, but each label continued to operate totally independently in A&R matters and also applied their own expertise in marketing and advertising.

On July 1, 1971, following the pattern set by similar joint ventures in Canada and Australia, the Warner labels entered into a partnership with the British arm of CBS Records to press and distribute Warner-Reprise product in the United Kingdom, although this was undertaken as a cooperative venture rather than a formally incorporated business partnership. The Billboard article that reported the new arrangement also noted that, despite their intense competition in the US market, CBS continued to press Warner-Reprise recordings in the US. However the new UK arrangement was a major blow to Warner's previous British manufacturer Pye Records, for whom Warner-Reprise had been their largest account. With the scheduled addition of the UK rights to the Atlantic catalogue, which would revert to Kinney in early 1972, Billboard predicted that the Warner-CBS partnership would have a 25–30% share of the UK music market.

In April 1971, thanks mainly to the influence of Ahmet Ertegun, the Kinney group announced a major coup with its acquisition of the worldwide rights to the Rolling Stones' new label Rolling Stones Records, following the expiration of the band's contract with British Decca (then separate from the American label) and the acrimonious end to their business relationship with their former manager Allen Klein. Under the terms of the deal, Atlantic subsidiary Atco would distribute the Stones' recordings in the US, with other territories mainly handled by Warner Bros. international divisions.

One of Kinney's wisest investments was Fleetwood Mac. The band signed with Reprise in the early 1970s after relocating to the US, and the label supported the group through numerous lineup changes and several lean years during which the band's records sold relatively poorly, although they remained a popular concert attraction. Ironically, after the group's transfer to Warner Bros. in 1975 and the recruitment of new members Lindsey Buckingham and Stevie Nicks, the group scored a major international hit with the single "Rhiannon" and consolidated with the best selling albums Fleetwood Mac, Rumours and Tusk.

==== Warner Communications (1972–1990) ====
Due to a financial scandal involving price fixing in its parking operations, Kinney National spun off its non-entertainment assets in 1972 (as National Kinney Corporation) and changed its name to Warner Communications Inc.

In 1972, the Warner group acquired another rich prize, David Geffen's Asylum Records. The $7 million purchase brought in several acts that proved crucial to WEA's subsequent success, including Linda Ronstadt, the Eagles, Jackson Browne, Joni Mitchell, and later Warren Zevon. On the downside, however, it was rumored that Warner was soon concerned about its possible liability under the California State Labor Code because of Geffen's questionable status as both the manager of most of the Asylum acts and the head of the record label to which they were signed. The sale included the Asylum Records label and its recordings, as well as Geffen's lucrative music publishing assets and the interests in the royalties of some of the artists managed by Geffen and partner Elliot Roberts. Geffen accepted a five-year contract with WCI and turned over his 75% share in the Geffen-Roberts management company to Roberts and Warner paid Geffen and Roberts 121,952 common shares worth $4,750,000 at the time of the sale, plus $400,000 in cash and a further $1.6 million in promissory notes convertible to common stock.

Although it seemed a lucrative deal at the time, Geffen soon had reason to regret it. Uncharacteristically, he had greatly underestimated the value of his assets—within Asylum's first year as a Warner subsidiary, albums by Linda Ronstadt and the Eagles alone had earned more than the entire value of the Asylum sale. Geffen's discomfort was compounded by the fact that, within six months of the sale, the value of his volatile Warner shares had plummeted from $4.5 million to just $800,000. He appealed to Steve Ross to intervene, and as part of a make-good deal, Ross agreed to pay him the difference in the share value over five years. Acting on Jac Holzman's suggestion that Kinney should take Asylum from Atlantic and merge it with Elektra, Ross then appointed Geffen to run the new combined label.

In 1977, Warner Bros. Music, led by president Ed Silvers, formed Pacific Records for their composers and distributed (appropriately) by Atlantic Records. Alan O'Day was the first artist signed to the label, and the first release was "Undercover Angel". The song, which he described as a "nocturnal novelette", was released in February 1977. Within a few months it had become No. 1 in the country, and has sold approximately two million copies. It was also a hit in Australia, reaching No. 9 on the Australian Singles Chart. "Undercover Angel" also landed O'Day in an exclusive club as one of only a handful of writers/performers to pen a No. 1 hit for themselves and a No. 1 for another artist.

New signings in the late 1970s placed WEA in a strong position for the 1980s. A deal with Seymour Stein's Sire Records label (which Warner Bros. Records later took over) brought in several major punk rock and new wave acts including the Pretenders, the Ramones and Talking Heads and, most importantly, rising star Madonna; Elektra signed the Cars and Warner Bros. signed Prince, giving WEA several of the biggest-selling acts of the decade.

WEA's labels also distributed a number of otherwise independent labels. For example, Warner Bros. distributed Straight Records, DiscReet Records, Bizarre Records, Bearsville Records, and Geffen Records (the latter was sold to MCA in 1990). Atlantic Records distributed Swan Song Records. In 1975, WEA scored a major coup by signing a distribution agreement with Island Records, which only covered the United States and select other countries. For the next 14 years (initially with Warner Bros. until 1982, then with Atlantic afterward), WEA would distribute such artists as Bob Marley, U2, Robert Palmer, Anthrax, and Tom Waits. This relationship ended when Island was sold to PolyGram in 1989.

=== 1980s ===
Logo of WEA International

A name-only unit appearing exclusively next to copyright statements, WEA International Inc., was created in early 1982, to handle distribution of all Warner Bros., Elektra, and Atlantic (all these namings accounting for the initials in the title "WEA") releases for international countries.

A proposed 1983 international merger between PolyGram and WEA was forbidden by both the US Federal Trade Commission and West Germany's cartel office, so PolyGram's half-owner Philips then purchased a further 40% of the company from its partner Siemens, and bought the remaining shares in 1987. The same year, PolyGram divested its film and publishing operations, closed PolyGram Pictures and sold Chappell Music to Warner for US$275 million.

In 1976, Warner gained a brief early lead in digital media when it purchased the Atari computer company. WCI also blazed the trail in visual music with MTV, which it created and co-owned in partnership with American Express as Warner-Amex (which also ran the company's cable television systems, including the interactive TV experiment QUBE, which MTV spun-off from). By 1984, however, Warner rapidly divested many of these recent acquisitions, including Atari, The Franklin Mint, Panavision, MTV Networks and a cosmetics business; this was due in large part to the 1983 video game crash, which Atari had played a central role in, and the resulting loss of profits and investor confidence (Warner-Amex's cable system expansion also contributed to Warner's financial downturn).

WEA formed WEA Manufacturing in 1986. In 1988, WEA took over the German classical label Teldec and the British Magnet label.

In 1989, it was announced that Warner Communications was to merge with Time Inc. to form Time Warner, a transaction that was completed in 1990. Following the merger, WEA continued acquiring independent labels, buying CGD Records (Italy) and MMG Records (Japan) in 1989.

=== 1990s ===
Through the 1990s, Time Warner was the largest media company in the world, with assets in excess of US$20 billion and annual revenues in the billions of dollars; by 1991, Warner's music labels were generating sales valued at more than US$3 billion, with operating profits of $550 million, and by 1995, its music division dominated the US music industry with a 22% share of the domestic market. Acquisitions and corporate changes within the Warner group of labels continued after the Time Warner merger in 1990, WEA purchased French label Carrere Records, in 1992 it bought the leading French classical label Erato, and in 1993, it bought the Spanish DRO Records, Hungary's Magneoton label, the Swedish Telegram Records, Brazil's Continental Records and Finnish label Fazer Musiikki. WEA was renamed Warner Music in 1991. Time Warner became Time Warner Entertainment in 1992.

Atlantic launched two new subsidiary labels in the early 1990s: East West Records and Interscope Records. In 1995, East West absorbed Atco Records and was eventually folded into Elektra Records. In 1996, after causing much controversy, Interscope was purchased by MCA Music Entertainment.

During 1992, Warner Music faced one of the most serious public-relations crises in its history when a major controversy erupted over the provocative Warner Bros. recording "Cop Killer" from the self-titled album by Body Count, a heavy metal/rap fusion band led by Ice-T. Unfortunately for Warner, the song (which mentioned the Rodney King case) was issued just before the controversial acquittal of the police charged with King's beating, which sparked the 1992 Los Angeles Riots and the confluence of events put the song under the national spotlight. Complaints escalated over the summer—conservative police associations called for a boycott of Time Warner products, politicians including President George H. W. Bush denounced the label for releasing the song, Warner executives received death threats, Time Warner stockholders threatened to pull out of the company and the New Zealand police commissioner unsuccessfully tried to have the record banned there. Although Ice-T later voluntarily reissued Body Count without "Cop Killer", the furor seriously rattled Warner Music and in January 1993 the label made an undisclosed deal releasing Ice-T from his contract and returning the Body Count master tapes to him.

Also in 1992, the Rhino Records label signed a distribution agreement with Atlantic Records and Time Warner Entertainment bought a 50% stake in the Rhino Records label. The distribution agreement allowed Rhino to begin reissuing recordings from Atlantic's back catalogue.

In 1994, Canadian beverage giant Seagram bought a 14.5% stake in Time Warner, and the Warner publishing division — now called Warner/Chappell Music – acquired CPP/Belwin, becoming the world's largest owner of song copyrights and the world's largest publisher of printed music. In 1996, Time Warner Entertainment made another dramatic expansion of its media holdings, taking over the Turner Broadcasting System, which by then included the Turner cable TV network, CNN and the screen production houses Castle Rock Entertainment and New Line Cinema, acquisitions that brought huge profits into the Warner Group thanks to content assets like Seinfeld and the highly successful The Lord of the Rings film trilogy.

By the early 1990s, senior Warner staff like Ostin and Waronker had remained in their positions for several decades—a highly unusual situation in the American music industry—but the death of Steve Ross destabilized the Time Warner hierarchy, and over the next few years the music group was increasingly disrupted by internal power struggles, leading to a string of major executive upheavals in 1994–95, which The New York Times described as "a virtual civil war".

The central conflict was between Mo Ostin and Warner Music Group chairman Robert Morgado, who had joined the Warner group in the late 1980s. Because of his political background (he had been the chief-of-staff to former New York governor Hugh L. Carey) and his lack of music industry experience — especially compared to the widely revered Ostin—Morgado was viewed as an outsider at Warner. Nevertheless, he gained favour with Ross and Levin and was promoted in 1985 to oversee the Warner international music division after helping the company slash costs in its computer game sector.

Since his appointment as head of WBR, Ostin had always reported directly to Steve Ross and his successor Gerald Levin, but in late 1993, when Ostin's contract came up for renewal, Morgado asserted his authority, insisting that Ostin should now report directly to him. The tensions between them reached boiling point in July 1994 when Morgado appointed former Atlantic chief Doug Morris to head the Warner Music Group in the US, a decision that many saw as a deliberate move to hasten the departure of Ostin and Elektra head Robert Krasnow. Morgado's new structure was announced in August 1994 and Bob Krasnow resigned from Elektra the next day. Within days, after more than 30 years with the Warner music group and more than 20 years as president and chairman of Warner Bros. Records, Ostin announced he would not renew his current contract and would leave Warners when it expired on December 31, 1994. There was more negative publicity the following month, when leading Elektra act Metallica launched a lawsuit against the label, seeking a release from their contract and ownership of their master tapes, and claiming that Morgado had refused to honor a deal they had worked out with Krasnow before he quit.

Ostin's departure marked a seismic shift in the corporate culture at WBR and the news was greeted with dismay by industry insiders and the many artists whose careers he had helped to nurture. Lenny Waronker had agreed to take over as WBR chairman and CEO but in October 1994 he announced that he would not be taking up the position; he initially said that he would remain as President of WBR, but by this time there was already widespread speculation that he would leave, and he did so soon afterwards. The following year he re-joined Ostin and son Michael as joint head of the newly launched DreamWorks label.

Beginning in August 1994, Morgado alienated Morris by his clumsy handling of Warner's relationship with Interscope Records, the successful label founded by Ted Field and Jimmy Iovine and part-owned by Warner. Morgado had resisted making a decision about increasing the Warner stake in Interscope, which encouraged other companies to make overtures to the label; in response, Morgado threatened to send cease-and-desist notices to executives at several record companies, demanding that they stop approaching Interscope with buyout offers, a move that reportedly infuriated Iovine.

By late 1994, Morris was gaining the upper hand over his rival and media reports claimed that Morris had moved to settle with Metallica, offering a deal that was reportedly even more generous than the one they had worked out with Krasnow. Morgado now faced a showdown with Morris, who felt he was not being allowed to run WMG as he saw fit. In October 1994, Morris and 11 other Warner executives "staged an unprecedented insurrection that nearly paralyzed the world's largest record company". This led to a climactic meeting between Morris and Gerald Levin in late October, at which Morris reportedly threatened to quit if he had to continue to report to Morgado.

Morgado gave in to the demand that Morris be granted autonomy to run the North American operations and he was forced to upgrade Morris's position from chief operating officer to Chief Executive of Warner Music Group (US); Morris promptly named Danny Goldberg, former president of Atlantic Records, to run WBR in defiance of Morgado, who had a different candidate in mind and Levin also reduced Morgado's power to oversee Warner's mail-order record club division and its international operations. Morris then brought in Sylvia Rhone and Seymour Stein to stabilize Elektra, settled the Metallica lawsuit and persuaded Levin to purchase an additional 25% of Interscope, although this initiative proved short-lived.

The power struggle between Morgado and Morris reached a dramatic climax in May 1995 when Morgado was asked to resign by Gerald Levin, following a welter of complaints from executives at the three major Warner Music labels, who said that Morgado was undermining Morris's authority and damaging Warner's reputation among performers. Morgado was immediately replaced by HBO chairman Michael J. Fuchs, but the corporate upheavals did not end there; in late June 1995 Fuchs abruptly dismissed Doug Morris, saying that Morris had been "leading a campaign to destabilize Warner Music in an effort to seize control of the company". As Morris's strongest ally, Danny Goldberg was also under threat; he was initially told that he could stay on as President of WBR as long as he refrained from office politics and concentrate on the day-to-day management of the label, but he resigned as President of Warner Bros. Records soon after to pursue "other interests", and was replaced by WBR vice-chairman Russ Thyret.

That August saw yet another resignation, that of Mel Lewinter, then president and COO of Warner Music's domestic music operations; while Lewinter being an ally of Morris played a role in the former's ouster, speculation ran rampant about it also having to do with an internal investigation into improper sales practices (involving tens of thousands of CDs being stolen from Atlantic by sales manager Nick Maria, then being secretly resold to retailers; the profits were divided between the retailers and the Atlantic employees involved), which had earlier caused 10 executives (including Maria) to lose their jobs amid the investigation. Lewinter subsequently sued Warner Music for wrongful termination.

Despite early success with Dr. Dre and Snoop Dogg, and Morris's decision to increase Warner's stake to 50%, by the mid-1990s Interscope Records was being seen as a liability for the Warner group. Time Warner's board and investors had already been bruised by the damaging 1992 "Cop Killer" controversy and now they were faced with renewed criticism about the gangsta rap genre, in which Interscope's associate imprint Death Row Records was a key label. In mid-1995, Time Warner refused to distribute the Interscope album Dogg Food by Tha Dogg Pound, forcing the label to seek outside distribution, and late in the year TW sold its stake in Death Row back to co-owners Jimmy Iovine and Ted Field and soon after it sold off its share in Interscope to MCA Music Entertainment.

The upheaval at Warner was beneficial to its rivals, who picked up valuable executives who had left Warner. Goldberg moved over to Mercury Records; Morris joined MCA Music Entertainment Group and led its reorganization into Universal Music Group, now the world's largest record company. In November 1995, Fuchs was himself sacked by Levin, leaving the company with a reported US$60 million "golden parachute", and Time Warner co-chairmen Robert A. Daly and Terry Semel took over the running of the music division.

In 1998, Seagram boss Edgar Bronfman Jr. held talks aimed at merging Seagram's Universal Music, headed by Morris, with the venerable British recording company EMI, but the discussions came to nothing; Bronfman then oversaw Universal's takeover by Vivendi. WEA meanwhile continued to expand its publishing empire, buying a 90% stake in the Italian recording and music publishing group Nuova Fonit Cetra.

Also in 1998, Time Warner Entertainment bought the remaining 50% of the Rhino Records label they did not own. The Rhino Records retail store in Los Angeles was not included. Rhino then began reissuing the back catalogues of the Warner/Reprise and Elektra/Asylum labels. In 1999, Rhino launched Rhino Handmade, which released limited-edition reissues of lesser-known but still-significant recordings from the WEA labels.

=== 2000s ===
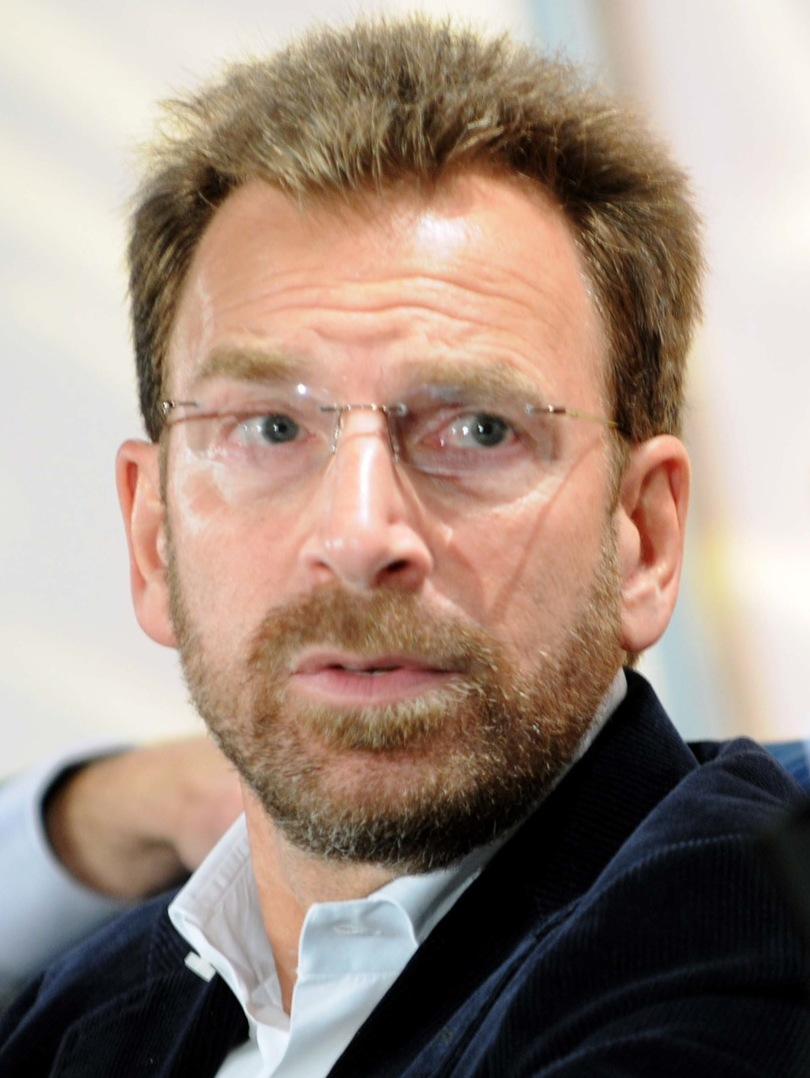
Edgar Bronfman Jr., scion of the Canadian-based Bronfman family, took control of WMG in 2004.

In 2000, Time Warner Entertainment merged with leading American internet service provider AOL to create AOL Time Warner, a new business entity. The new conglomerate again tried (and failed) to acquire EMI, and subsequent discussions about the takeover of BMG stalled, with Bertelsmann eventually offloading BMG into a joint venture with Sony. In 2002, AOL Time Warner further consolidated its hold over the publishing industry, buying 50% of music publisher Deston Songs from Edel AG. By the early 2000s, however, the effects of the dot-com crash had eroded AOL's profits and stock value, and with expected synergies between AOL and Time Warner never materializing, the Time Warner board sidelined its under-performing partner by dropping AOL from its business name and reverting to TimeWarner.

As a result of the CD price fixing issue, a settlement was reached in 2002 involving the music publishers and distributors Sony Music, WMG, Bertelsmann Music Group, EMI Music, and Universal Music. In restitution for price fixing they agreed to pay a $67.4 million fine and distribute $75.7 million in CDs to public and non-profit groups but admitted no wrongdoing.

The "Big W" logo designed by Saul Bass, formerly used as the logo of Warner Bros. Entertainment, now used as the corporate logo of Warner Music Group

Looking to reduce its debt load from the AOL merger, Time Warner — the corporate successor to the original Time Warner Entertainment— sold Warner Music Group in 2004 to a group of investors led by Edgar Bronfman Jr. for US$2.6 billion. This spinoff was completed on February 27, 2004. In the 2004 transition to independent ownership, WMG hired record industry heavyweight Lyor Cohen from Universal Music Group (the result of the merger between the PolyGram and MCA label families) to attempt to reduce cost and increase performance. Time Warner (now Skydance) no longer retains any ownership in WMG, though it had the option to reacquire up to 20% of WMG for three years following the closing of the transaction. WMG did, however, have a royalty-free license to use the Warner Bros. shield for 15 years, as well as the old Warner Communications logo as WMG's main logo. With the expiration of the royalty-free license in May 2019, Warner Bros. Records (which became separate from the eponymous film studio after the spinoff) was renamed Warner Records and a new logo was introduced to replace the WB shield.

No longer a subsidiary of Time Warner, WMG began cutting costs by offloading loss-making or low-earning divisions. Like its rival EMI, Warner reacted to the growth of the digital music market by making a historic change, moving out of record production by closing or selling off disc-pressing plants, particularly in territories such as the US and the Netherlands, where production costs are high. The US manufacturing operations were sold to Cinram in 2003, before the purchase from Time Warner.

In 2005, the Miami-based Warner Bros. Publications, which printed and distributed a broad selection of sheet music, books, educational material, orchestrations, arrangements and tutorials, was sold to Alfred Music Publishing, although the sale excluded the print music business of WMG's Word Music (church hymnals, choral music and associated instrumental music).

On May 3, 2006, WMG apparently rejected a buyout offer from EMI. Then WMG offered to buy EMI and it also rejected the offer. In August 2007, EMI was purchased by Terra Firma Capital Partners. Talk of a possible WMG acquisition of EMI was fanned once again in 2009 after WMG executed a bond offering for $1.1 billion, which brought to light WMG's relatively strong financial position, which was contrasted with the weakened and debt-laden state of EMI. The same year WMG acquired Rykodisc and Roadrunner Records.

In September 2006, after pulling its content from the service earlier in the year, WMG entered into a new licensing deal with the video streaming service YouTube. Under the deal, WMG would be able to handle advertising sales for its artists' music videos on the service (as well as monetize user-created videos that include WMG-owned recordings) and partake in revenue sharing with YouTube, and also collaborate with YouTube on building a "premium" user experience for its content and associated channels.

On December 27, 2007, Warner announced that it would sell digital music without digital rights management through AmazonMP3, making it the third major label to do so. In 2008, The New York Times reported that WMG's Atlantic Records became the first major record label to generate more than half of its music sales in the U.S. from digital products. In 2010, Fast Company magazine detailed the company's transformation efforts in its recorded music division, where it has redefined the relationships it has with artists and diversified its revenue streams through its expansion into growing areas of the music business.

In 2008, WMG and several other major labels made investments in the new music streaming service Spotify.

Due to licensing deal negotiations between Google and WMG in 2008, music video content licensed by WMG was removed from YouTube. In 2009, it was announced that the companies had reached a deal, and videos would be re-added to YouTube. As of 2017, WMG had extended its deal with YouTube.

In 2009, Warner Music took over its South-East Asian and Korean distribution of EMI audio and video products, including newer domestic releases, which was announced in September 2008. The two companies already enjoyed a successful partnership in India, the Middle East and North Africa, where EMI marketed and distributed Warner Music's physical product from 2005.

=== 2010s ===
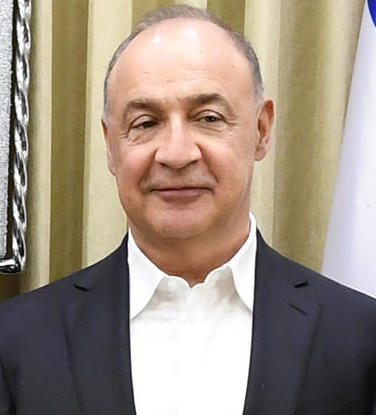
Leonard Blavatnik, founder of Access Industries, purchased WMG in 2011.

WMG formed a partnership with MTV Networks in June 2010 that allowed MTVN to exclusively sell ads on WMG's premium content; in turn, views of WMG videos would be counted as views for MTVN.

In May 2011, WMG announced its sale to Access Industries, a conglomerate controlled by Soviet-born billionaire Len Blavatnik, for US$3.3 billion in cash. The price represented $8.25 a share; a 34% premium over the six-month-before average price, and a 4% premium over the day-before price. Overall, this was a drop of over 70% since 2007. According to the Wall Street Journal, the deal ended a three-month sale process in which as many as 10 bidders, including Los Angeles-based brothers Tom and Alec Gores, and Sony Corp. vied for the company. Blavatnik was a shareholder and former board member of WMG at the time of the purchase announcement. The purchase was completed on July 20, 2011, and the company became private. In August 2011, Stephen Cooper became CEO of Warner Music Group replacing Edgar Bronfman Jr., who became chairman of the company. Bronfman Jr. stepped down as chairman of the company on January 31, 2012.

==== EMI label purchase and divestment ====
In 2013, Warner acquired longtime EMI division Parlophone, along with EMI Classics and some regional EMI operations, from UMG for £487 million (around $764.54 million US). This news came after reports that WMG was in talks to acquire EMI's recorded music business, which was eventually bought by Universal. The European Commission approved the sale in May 2013, and Warner closed the acquisition on July 1. The EMI Classics roster was absorbed into Warner Classics and the Virgin Classics roster was absorbed into the revived Erato Records. In November 2013, WMG paid Universal an additional €30 million for Parlophone, following an arbitration process in respect to the original sale price.

In order to accommodate a deal made with IMPALA and the Merlin Network when it acquired Parlophone, WMG agreed to offload over $200 million worth in catalogues to various independent labels. The labels had until February 28, 2014, to inform Warner Music of which artist catalogues they were interested in acquiring, and said artists had to approve of the divestments. By March 2015, over 140 independent labels had placed bids on over 11,000 Warner Music artists valuing $6 billion, far higher than expectations. In March 2016, Curb Records acquired Warner Music's 80% share of Word Entertainment, though WMG would continue to distribute the label. In April 2016, the first confirmed sale of a Warner Music artist was the back catalogue of English band Radiohead to XL Recordings. As of the end of May 2016, WMG had sold the catalogue of Chrysalis Records to Blue Raincoat Music, as well as the catalogues of ten other artists, including Everything But the Girl, Steve Harley & Cockney Rebel, and Lucinda Williams. In September 2016, Nettwerk acquired the rights to albums by Guster and Airbourne from Warner Music.

In April 2017, Warner Music agreed to sell the independent distributor Zebralution back to its founders. On June 1, 2017, WMG divested additional artists, including the catalogues of Hot Chip and Buzzcocks to Domino Recording Company; Tom Waits to Anti-; and Howard Jones, Dinosaur Jr., and Kim Wilde to Cherry Red Records. Cosmos Music Group acquired the rights to Per Gessle and Marie Fredriksson, while Neil Finn's catalogue moved to his Lester Records label. On July 6, 2017, Because Music acquired 10 French artists, most of London Records' back catalogue, and The Beta Band, while Concord Music acquired albums by Jewel, Sérgio Mendes, R.E.M., the Traveling Wilburys, and several rock, blues, and jazz artists. In August 2017, The Lemonheads and The Groundhogs were transferred to Fire Records. In October 2017, Strut Records acquired albums by Patrice Rushen and Miriam Makeba.

In November 2017, T.I.'s catalogue was sold to Cinq Music Group. Woah Dad! (and later Round Hill Music) acquired over 20 catalogues, including those of Ziggy Marley, Estelle, and several Swedish artists. while Believe Digital acquired the rights to EMF and several French artists. In April 2018, RT Industries acquired seven catalogues from WMG, including Sugar Ray and Fat Joe. In May 2018, New State Music acquired the catalogues of Paul Oakenfold and Dirty Vegas. Other winning bidders included The Echo Label (Thomas Dolby, Sigue Sigue Sputnik and Supergrass), Nature Sounds (Roy Ayers), The state51 Conspiracy (Donovan), PIAS Recordings (Failure), Evolution Music Group (Mr. Big), Playground Music Scandinavia (Olle Adolphson), Metal Blade Records (King Diamond), Snapper Music (Mansun) and its sublabel Kscope (Porcupine Tree), Phoenix Music International (Lulu), Kobalt Label Services (HIM), and Tommy Boy Music (which reclaimed its pre-2002 catalogue and the rights to Brand Nubian, Handsome Boy Modeling School's White People, Grand Puba, and Club Nouveau). All the labels had to complete their deals by September 30, 2017; though a few announcements came after that date.

==== Expansion ====
In October 2012, WMG became one of the last major labels to sign with Google's music service. It was also one of the last labels to reach an agreement with Spotify.

In June 2013, WMG expanded into Russia by acquiring Gala Records, best known as the longtime distributor of EMI. Later that year, Warner Music Russia agreed to locally distribute releases by Disney Music Group and Sony Music. Later that year, WMG closed a deal with Clear Channel Media that saw its artists paid for terrestrial radio play for the first time. Clear Channel would get preferential rates for streaming songs through its iHeartRadio service and other online platforms. It was believed that the agreement would put pressure on other big labels, including Sony and Universal, to reach similar deals.

In 2017, WMG formed a TV and film division, Warner Music Entertainment, led by former MGM executive Charlie Cohen. In March 2020, it hired Kate Shepherd, the former head of entertainment at Ridley Scott Creative Group. This division paired with Imagine Entertainment on a Nat Geo limited series Genius: Aretha, which led to a co-producing and co-financing agreement for a music slate in July 2020.

In February 2022, Warner announced acquisition of controlling interest in a South India based distribution label Divo Music.

==== International labels ====
On November 14, 2013, it was determined that Warner Music's releases in the Middle East would be distributed by Universal Music as a result of the integration of EMI's branch in said region. Sony Music India would assume distribution of WMG in India, Sri Lanka, and rest of SAARC countries except Bangladesh. In December 2013, Warner Music began operating the wholly owned South African subsidiary after acquiring the Gallo's stakes that it did not own. In April 2014, WMG announced that it had acquired Chinese record label Gold Typhoon.

In April 2016, WMG agreed to distribute most of BMG Rights Management's catalogue worldwide through Warner's ADA division, though a few frontline releases would remain distributed by other labels.

Around the end of May 2016, WMG acquired the Indonesian label PT Indo Semar Sakti. Warner Music UK launched The Firepit in May 2016, a creative content division, innovation centre and recording studio located at its United Kingdom headquarters in London. On June 2, 2016, Warner Music acquired Swedish compilation label X5 Music Group.

In September 2017, one week after acquiring American rock label Artery Recordings, WMG acquired the Dutch EDM label Spinnin' Records. In February 2018, Warner Music launched a division in the Middle East, based in Beirut, Lebanon. Warner Music Middle East will cover 17 markets across North Africa and the Middle East.

In January 2019, WMG signed a Turkish distribution deal with Doğan Media Group, which will represent the record company for physical and digital releases.

In May 2019, Warner Music Finland acquired the hip-hop label Monsp Records. In July 2019, Warner Music Slovakia acquired Forza Music, which owned the former state-owned label Opus Records. In February 2021, WMG purchased a minority stake in the Saudi Arabian record label Rotana Records.

==== Elektra Music Group and further investments ====
In July 2017, Warner Music acquired the concert discovery website Songkick. In May, news media reported that Warner Music led an investment round in Hooch, a popular subscription-lifestyle application including blockchain-based payment technology.

Announced on June 18, 2018, but effective on October 1, 2018, Warner Music Group launched Elektra Music Group as a stand-alone staffed music company with the labels Elektra Records, Fueled By Ramen, Low Country Sound, Black Cement, and Roadrunner Records. A handful of major artists would transfer from Atlantic. This returned the group back to the Warner-Elektra-Atlantic (WEA) triad that had marked the original company organization for decades.

On August 2, 2018, Warner Music announced that it acquired Uproxx Media Group and its properties (except for BroBible, which will continue to publish independently) for an undisclosed sum, although Uproxx has raised around $43m (£33m) from previous investment, which provides some sense of the firm's valuation. In September 2018, WMG acquired German merchandise retailer EMP Merchandising from Sycamore Partners for $180 million.

In October 2018, Warner Music Group announced the launch of the WMG Boost seed venture fund. Several labels of Warner Music moved into the Los Angeles Arts District in 2019 where the company had purchased a former Ford Motor Company assembly plant.

=== 2020s ===
On March 9, 2020, WMG expanded to India, creating the Warner Music India unit based in Mumbai and handling business in other countries for the South Asian Association for Regional Cooperation. Jay Mehta (former executive of Sony Music India) would take change of the unit as the managing director in April. Before the division's foundation, Warner's releases were distributed in the country by EMI/Virgin Records (India) Pvt., and by Sony Music India since EMI's breakup.

In August 2020, Warner Music acquired Tel Aviv- and New York-based IMGN Media in a deal worth approximately $100 million. In September 2020, WMG acquired the online hip-hop magazine HipHopDX. In 2021, WMG invested an eight figure sum into global multiplayer gaming platform Roblox. This followed WMG artist Ava Max's live performance on the platform the previous year.

Warner Music Group had planned an IPO of current investors' stock in March 2020, but withdrew its IPO just before the March 2 kick off due to the COVID-19 pandemic. On June 3, 2020, it completed its IPO on Nasdaq, raising almost $2 billion with a valuation of $12.75 billion, making WMG once again a publicly traded company after previously going private in 2011. On June 12, 2020, Tencent announced that it had purchased 10.4% of Warner Music's Class A shares, or 1.6% of the company. Tencent already owns 10% of shares of WMG's largest competitor, Universal Music Group, which it acquired from Vivendi in March. Also, this makes Sony Music the only major music company not directly owned in any percentage by a Chinese company (it is wholly owned by the Japanese conglomerate Sony).

In December 2020, WMG signed a partnership deal with TikTok to provide music to its platform for users to use for their content.

On March 8, 2022, WMG suspended all its operations in Russia following the Russian invasion of Ukraine.

In January 2023, Stephen Cooper was succeeded by Robert Kyncl as CEO of WMG.

In July 2023, Warner Music Group formed a partnership with Canva, the graphic design platform, to add commercial music to Canva's asset library and enable its customers to insert music clips to their designs. Also in July 2023, WMG made a music-licensing deal with TikTok which included licensing the Warner Recorded Music and Warner Chappell Music to the app, TikTok Music and TikTok's Commercial Music Library.

In September 2023, WMG opened a new creative hub in Berlin. Later in October 2023, Warner Music Group launched a new creative hub in Amsterdam to house Benelux units and Spinnin' Records.

In September 2025, the "No Music For Genocide" boycott initiative urged Warner Music Group to suspend all of its operations in Israel in protest of the genocide in Gaza.

In November 2025, WMG launched a joint venture with artificial intelligence music venture, Suno. As part of the settlement agreement struck between the two firms, Warner will let users create AI-generated music on Suno using the voices, names and likeness of artists who opt-in to the programme.

On March 20, 2026, the company announced a first-look deal with Netflix to make documentaries on WMG's artists.Paramount Pictures announced that it would partner with Warner Music Group to produce films based on the lives and music of WMG's roster of artists and songwriters in May 2026.

In 2026, WMG reacquired Zebralution from Bookwire, nine years after divesting the company to its founders.

== Arts Music ==
On June 6, 2017, Warner Music Group launched a new division, Arts Music, Inc., which transcends the pop mainstream and consists of labels for classical, jazz, children's music, and music scores from films/movies and musical theaters. The division was placed under president Kevin Gore, who reported to Eliah Seton, President of ADA Worldwide, WMG's independent distribution and services arm. At the same time, Warner Classics, including the Erato label, while remaining based in Paris and continuing under president Alain Lanceron, were transferred into the new division. Also, a joint venture with Sh-K-Boom/Ghostlight Records, the theatrical music company, was formed, with founder/president Kurt Deutsch being named as senior vice president of theatrical and catalog development for Warner/Chappell Music.

In November 2018, Arts Music signed a multi-year deal with Sesame Workshop to revive the Sesame Street Records label starting early 2019. In June 2019, WMG purchased First Night Record, a musical-theater cast recording company, and placed the company within Arts Music. On June 24, 2019, the division launched the licensed Cloudco Entertainment label with the release of the current Holly Hobbie theme song as a part of a multi-season deal. Build-A-Bear Workshop teamed up with Arts Music and Warner Chappell Music in July 2019 to partner on the Build-A-Bear label, with Patrick Hughes and Harvey Russell.

On May 1, 2020, toy manufacturer and entertainment company, Mattel, struck an agreement with Arts Music to become the exclusive distributor of its music catalogue. The agreement at the time was to make available hundreds of "never-before-released" and newly released albums and singles for existing Mattel properties/brands for digital distribution, beginning with the launch of Thomas & Friends' birthday album a week later on May 8. As a result, the soundtrack album to Monster High: Boo York, Boo York and other Mattel albums previously released under Universal Music Group through its film distribution agreement with Universal Pictures would be re-released under the pseudonym label: Mattel–Arts Music by ADA Worldwide.

== Music publishing ==
Warner Chappell Music dates back to 1811 and the creation of Chappell & Company, a sheet music and instrument merchant in London. In 1929, Jack L. Warner, president of Warner Bros. Pictures Inc., founded Music Publishers Holding Company (MPHC) to acquire music copyrights as a means of providing inexpensive music for films and, in 1987, Warner Bros.' corporate parent, Warner Communications, acquired Chappell & Company from PolyGram. Its printed music operation, Warner Bros. Publications, was sold to Alfred Music on June 1, 2005.

Among the historic compositions of which the publishing rights are controlled by WMG are the works of Cole Porter, Richard Rodgers and Lorenz Hart. In the 1930s and 1940s, Chappell Music also ran a profitable orchestration division for Broadway musicals, with house arrangers of the caliber of Robert Russell Bennett, Don Walker, Ted Royal and Hans Spialek. Between them they had orchestrated about 90% of the productions seen up to late 1941.

== See also ==
- List of record labels
- List of Warner Music Group artists
- List of Warner Music Group labels

== Bibliography ==
- Fred Goodman (1997). The Mansion on the Hill: Dylan, Young, Geffen, Springsteen and the Head-on Collision of Rock and Commerce. Jonathan Cape/Random House. ISBN 978-0679743774.
