= WEA Manufacturing =

Vinyl record, cassette and compact disc manufacturer

WEA Manufacturing was the record, tape, and compact disc manufacturing arm of WEA International Inc. from 1978 to 2003, when it was sold and merged into Cinram International, a previous competitor. The last owner when the plant closed was Technicolor.

== History ==
WEA Manufacturing Inc. was created in 1978–1979 when Warner Communications Inc. purchased two of its longtime suppliers: the record pressing plants Specialty Records Corporation (Olyphant, Pennsylvania) and Allied Record Company (Los Angeles). The company was headquartered in Olyphant, where the original plant was replaced in late 1981 by a new facility which retained the name Specialty Records Corporation. The Specialty Records Corporation name was dropped in 1996 in favor of WEA Manufacturing.

The company invested in CD manufacturing in 1986, matching a $247,000 contribution by economic development corporation Ben Franklin Technology Partners to develop and implement new processes of manufacturing audio CDs and CD-ROMs. BFTP assembled a team of experts in physics, electrical engineering, and thin film technology from the University of Scranton and Lehigh University to carry out the research and development. The Olyphant plant and another plant in Alsdorf, Germany, were expanded to support CD pressing that year, with the Olyphant facility's production commencing first in September 1986.

WEA Manufacturing grew to become one of the largest manufacturers of recorded media in the world.

The company began manufacturing Laserdiscs in July 1991.

The company's DVD division, Warner Advanced Media Operations (WAMO), helped design the high-density format used in DVDs, and manufactured some of the first DVDs in the late 1990s.

The company was sold to Cinram International in October 2003 and no longer exists under the name WEA Manufacturing, but the Olyphant plant continued to operate under its new ownership. In 2005, the company was Lackawanna County's largest employer, with over 2,300 people working at the Olyphant plant.

Cinram closed the former Allied plant in 2006, while Technicolor (which purchased Cinram's assets in 2015) closed the Olyphant plant in 2018.

== Patents ==
WEA Manufacturing held U.S. patents related to compact disc manufacture:

- Print scanner, (1993).
- Interference of converging spherical waves with application to the design of light-readable information-recording media and systems for reading such media, (2004).
- Method of manufacturing a composite disc structure and apparatus for performing the method, (2005).
- Methods and apparatus for reducing the shrinkage of an optical disc's clamp area and the resulting optical disc, (2005).

== Litigation ==
In 1990, WEA Manufacturing was sued by a Canadian firm, Optical Recording Co. (ORC), for alleged infringement of two 1971 patents related to glass mastering equipment which was used by Time Warner and WEA Manufacturing in the manufacture of approximately 450 million CDs. ORC contended that unlike five other major CD manufacturers in the U.S., Time Warner had refused to license the technology from ORC. In 1992, a jury assessed damages of 6 cents per disc, plus $4–5 million in interest.

== See also ==
- Sony Digital Audio Disc Corporation, another early U.S. manufacturer of CDs
