= List of Warner Music Group artists =

Artists whose work has been produced by the Warner Music Group include:

== A ==
- Aaron Kwok - Hong Kong (1990–1995, moved to Philips Records from 1996 to 1999)
- Aaliyah (1996, via Atlantic Records)
- AB'S
- ABBA (via Atlantic Records during US release of Waterloo)
- AC/DC
- Action Bronson
- Adam Faith
- Adam Lambert
- Adia Victoria
- Adina Howard
- aespa (SM/via Warner (2022-2023) outside South Korea/via Warner Music Japan (Since 2026) Japan Only)
- Afrojack
- Agung Gede
- Ailee
- Aimee Mayo
- Airbourne
- Against the Current
- Agallah
- The Agonist
- A-ha
- Alec Benjamin
- AJR
- Akon
- Alesana
- Alestorm
- Alex Dezen
- Alex Gaskarth
- Alex Metric
- Alex Newell
- Alex Warren
- Alexander Armstrong
- Aleyna Tilki
- Alice in Chains (Outside U.S. territories)
- Alison Balsom
- Alison Sudol (Warner/Chappell Music)
- Alissa White-Gluz
- All Saints
- All Time Low
- All-4-One
- Allison Moorer (Rykodisc and Warner/Chappell Music)
- Alok
- Alphabeat
- Alphaville
- Alt-J
- Alter Bridge
- Amanda Palmer
- Amelia Lily
- America
- Amillionsons
- The Amity Affliction
- Amon Amarth (Outside U.S. territories, via Metal Blade Records)
- Anderson East
- Annabel Jones
- Andra Day
- Andrea Daly (Warner/Chappell Music)
- Androp
- Anitta (2013–2023)
- Anne-Marie
- Annie Moses Band
- Annihilator
- Anthrax
- The Apples in Stereo
- Arcadia
- Architects (US, via Epitaph Records)
- Arctic Monkeys
- Art of Dying
- Art Garfunkel
- Artemis Quartet
- Arthur McArthur
- Artms
- Ashley Monroe
- Ashnikko
- Atlantic Starr
- Atlas Genius
- Atreyu
- Auburn
- Aubrie Sellers
- Audra Mae
- Aura Dione (Since 2019 with the Single Shania Twain)
- Aurora Orchestra
- Auryn
- Avenged Sevenfold
- Ava Max
- Ayaka
- AzChike
- Anas Rankoma

== B ==
- B1A4
- Baby Chaos
- Babyshambles
- Badfinger
- Bad Company
- Bad Religion
- Frankie Ballard
- Gnarls Barkley
- Basshunter (Sweden)
- Bat for Lashes
- Baton Rouge
- Battlecross (Outside U.S. territories, via Metal Blade Records)
- Bazzi
- Bebe Rexha
- Becky Hill
- Bee Gees
- Behemoth (Outside U.S. territories, via Metal Blade Records)
- Bellefire
- Belly
- Belinda
- Belinda Carlisle (Rykodisc)
- Belouis Some
- Benson Boone
- Bernard Cribbins
- Beverley Knight
- Ben Lee
- Bette Midler
- Beyoncé (Warner/Chappell Music)
- Big Ali
- BigBang
- Big & Rich
- Billie Joe Armstrong
- Billy J. Kramer
- Billy Lawrence
- Birdy
- Björk
- The Black Dahlia Murder (Outside U.S. territories, via Metal Blade Records)
- The Black Keys
- Black Label Society
- Blake Shelton (Warner Music Nashville)
- Blanka Stajkow
- Blas Cantó
- Blazin' Squad
- Blind Guardian (Europe, via Nuclear Blast/BMG Rights Management)
- Bliss
- Blonde
- Blur
- B.o.B
- Bob Sinclar
- Bobby Lewis
- Bobby Tench
- Bolt Thrower (Outside U.S. territories, via Metal Blade Records)
- Boyzone
- Haley Bonar
- Bonnie Lou
- Brian Imanuel Soewarno
- Braxton Keith
- Brave Girls
- Brendon Urie
- Brett Eldredge
- The Brilliant Green
- Bruce Dickinson
- Broken Hands
- Brook Benton
- Bruno Mars
- Bruno & Marrone (1995–1998)
- Brynn Cartelli
- Michael Bublé
- Biffy Clyro
- Built to Spill
- Busted
- Burna boy

== C ==
- Candlebox
- Candlemass
- Cane Hill
- Cannibal Corpse (Outside U.S. territories, via Metal Blade Records)
- Carabao (Warner Music Thailand)
- Cardi B (Atlantic Records)
- Carly Simon
- Cascada
- Cash Cash
- Cavalera Conspiracy
- Cedric Gervais
- CeeLo Green
- Cosculluela
- The Corrs (Atlantic Records)
- Johnny Cash
- Charice
- Charles Aznavour
- Charlie Chan (Wu Music/Disney Music/Warner Music)
- Charlie Puth
- Charlie Worsham
- Chuck Willis
- Cheap Trick
- Cheat Codes
- Chelsea Grin
- The Chemical Brothers
- Cher
- Cherish (2003–2006)
- Chester Bennington
- Cherry Bullet
- Chicos de Barrio
- Chiddy Bang
- Chimaira
- Chisato Moritaka
- Chisu
- Choi Jun-hee
- Chris Bell
- Chappell Roan
- Chrissy Costanza
- Christina and Michelle Naughton
- Christina Perri (Atlantic Records)
- Christine and the Queens
- Christopher Cross
- Chromeo
- Chevelle
- Cilla Black
- Clean Bandit
- Cleopatra
- Cliff Bennett and the Rebel Rousers
- CN Blue
- Coal Chamber
- Cobra Starship
- Coco Jones
- Code Orange
- Cody Simpson
- Natalie Cole
- Phil Collins
- Coolio
- The Corrs
- Cowboy Troy
- Chicago
- The Cars
- Coal Chamber
- Coldplay (2013–present)
- Coldrain
- Conor Maynard
- Corey Taylor
- Cradle of Filth
- Craig David
- Crazy Frog (Sweden)
- Creamy
- Crystal Fighters
- Curtis Fuller
- Charli XCX
- Pakho Chau

== D ==
- D-Side
- DaBaby
- Darshan Ravel
- Diamond Platnumz
- Dan Wilson
- Daniel Lanois
- Danity Kane (Bad Boy/Atlantic)
- Daft Punk (Parlophone)
- Damon Albarn
- Darius Rucker
- The Darkness
- Daughtry
- Dave Mustaine (Via Megadeth)
- Dave Wong - Republic of China (1987–1995, now moved to Philips Record from 1996 to 1998)
- David Bowie
- David Gray (iht/Atlantic - outside US/Canada)
- David Rogers
- David Cook (Warner/Chappell Music)
- David Draiman (Via Disturbed)
- David Guetta (2013–present)
- Sammy Davis Jr.
- Dawn of Ashes
- Day26
- DAY6
- Dean Martin
- Dead Sara
- Death
- Death Angel (Europe, via Nuclear Blast/BMG Rights Management)
- Death Cab for Cutie
- Debi Nova
- Debbie Harry
- Deftones
- Delain
- Jason Derülo
- Device
- The Devil Wears Prada
- DevilDriver
- Devo
- Dez Fafara (Via DevilDriver)
- Diddy
- Diljit Dosanjh
- Dio
- Dire Straits
- Disturbed
- Alesha Dixon
- DJ Drama
- Dokken
- Dolo Tonight
- The Donnas
- The Doobie Brothers
- The Doors
- Double You
- Down
- DragonForce
- Drake Bell
- DRAM (Empire/Atlantic)
- Dr. Dre (Warner/Chappell Music)
- DreamDoll
- Dream Theater
- Drew Parker (Warner Music Nashville)
- Dua Lipa
- Dwight Yoakam

== E ==
- E-40
- Eagles
- Echosmith
- Édith Piaf
- Ed Motta (1990–1996)
- Ed Sheeran (2011-2026)
- Edis
- Eiffel 65
- Eight Seconds
- Eisley
- Elbow (Warner/Chappell Music)
- Brett Eldredge
- Electric Boys
- Eliza Doolittle
- Ella Eyre
- Ella Henderson
- Elliot Moss (Warner/Chappell Music)
- Elsa Lunghini
- Elsten Torres
- EMF
- Enuff Z'Nuff
- Enya
- Epica (Europe, via Nuclear Blast/BMG Rights Management)
- The Everly Brothers
- Erena Ono
- Eric Clapton
- Eskimo Joe
- Esha Tewari
- Evermore
- Everything
- Exodus (Europe, via Nuclear Blast/MBG Rights Management)

== F ==
- Fabolous
- Forrest Frank
- Faith No More
- Faster Pussycat
- Fat Joe
- Fat Trel
- Fatboy Slim
- Fats Domino
- Fay Ray
- Fear, and Loathing in Las Vegas
- Fei Yu Ching (via UFO Record)
- Felip
- Fetty Wap
- Lupe Fiasco
- F.I.R.
- Filippa Giordano
- Flaming Lips
- Flanders & Swann
- Fleetwood Mac
- Flotsam and Jetsam
- Florent Mothe
- Florence Road
- Flo Rida
- Khalil Fong
- Fort Minor
- The Fourmost
- Frankie Ballard
- The Four Seasons
- Aretha Franklin
- Stan Freberg
- Freezepop
- Frente!
- Frightened Rabbit
- Foreigner
- Foy Vance
- Fred Again
- Front Line Assembly
- Funeral for a Friend
- Fear Factory
- F.T. Island
- Fun.

== G ==
- Gabrielle Aplin
- Galneryus
- Garbage
- Gass
- Genesis
- George
- Georgi Kay
- The Georgia Satellites
- Gerard Way
- Gesaffelstein
- Jimmie Dale Gilmore
- Glassjaw
- Glenn Frey
- Gloriana
- Gojira
- Goldfrapp
- Goo Goo Dolls
- The Good Natured
- The Good, the Bad & the Queen
- Gorilla Zoe
- Gorillaz
- Got7
- Graham Coxon
- Amy Grant
- The Grateful Dead
- David Gray
- Lotti Golden (WMG/Atlantic Records)
- Green Day
- Nanci Griffith
- Josh Groban
- Guan Zhe
- Gucci Mane
- Guilherme Arantes
- Günther & The Sunshine Girls (Sweden)
- Gwar (Outside U.S. and territories, via Metal Blade Records)
- Gyllene Tider
- Gym Class Heroes
- Gyroscope
- GDRAGON

== H ==
- HammerFall
- Hale
- Halestorm
- Hatebreed
- Hayley Williams (Via Paramore)
- Jam Hsiao
- Bill Haley and His Comets
- Johnny Hallyday (Warner Music France, 2006–present)
- Hard-Fi
- Heaven & Hell
- Helloween (Europe, via Nuclear Blast/BMG Rights Management)
- Sara Hickman
- Faith Hill
- Paris Hilton
- Ryoko Hirosue
- HIM
- Home and Away
- Hoodoo Gurus
- Hootie and the Blowfish
- The Housemartins
- Huang Zitao (Huang Z.TAO Studio/L.TAO Entertainment)
- Hugel
- Hunter Hayes
- Vivian Hsu

== I ==
- Idntt (Outside South Korea)
- Ill Niño
- In Flames<reIn This Moment
- Ilya
- Natalie Imbruglia
- Indah Nevertari (Indonesia)
- Inner Circle
- James Ingram
- Irene Cara
- Iron & Wine
- Iron Maiden
- INNA
- Isabella Castillo
- The Isley Brothers
- IU
- IV of Spades
- Izna (South Korea)

== J ==
- Jack Ü (Mad Decent/Owsla)
- Jack Harlow (Generation Now/Atlantic)
- Jacki-O (2003-2004)
- Jake Miller
- Jamie
- James Hype
- Janelle Monáe
- Janice Vidal
- Jasmine Guy
- Jasmine Thompson
- Jason Mraz
- Jason Newsted
- Jay-Z (Warner/Chappell Music)
- JJ Lin
- Jolin Tsai (2009–2018)
- Jesse & Joy
- Jin Akanishi
- JYJ
- JLS
- Jack's Mannequin
- Colin James
- Etta James
- Jane's Addiction
- Jean-Michel Jarre
- Jeffree Star (part of Independent Label Group/Warner Music's Popsicle Records)
- Ben Jelen
- Jemaine Clement
- Katherine Jenkins
- Jenny Lewis
- Jess Glynne
- Jess Lee
- Jess Mills
- Jesse Leach (Via Killswitch Engage)
- Jet
- Jethro Tull
- Jewel
- Jill Scott
- Jill Vidal
- Jimi Hendrix
- The Jimi Hendrix Experience
- Jimmy Eat World
- Jisoo (Blissoo/via Warner outside South Korea)
- John Butler Trio
- John Lennon
- John Linnell
- John Michael Montgomery
- JoJo
- Joji
- Jonathan Davis
- Howard Jones
- Mike Jones
- Quincy Jones
- Spike Jones
- Jools Holland
- Jeremy Jordan
- William Joseph
- Josh Groban
- Joshua Ledet
- Joyce DiDonato
- Joyspeed (1994–1996)
- JR JR
- Judy Henske
- Julia Michaels (Warner/Chappell Music)
- Julien-K
- Junior Prom
- Junior Senior
- Justice
- Justin Tranter
- Justine Skye
- Juvenile (rapper)

== K ==
- K.C. & the Sunshine Band
- Kacey Musgraves (Warner/Chappell Music)
- Kamelot
- Kate Earl (Record Collection/Warner Bros.)
- Kate Nash (Warner/Chappell Music)
- Katy Tiz
- Kirko Bangz
- Kelani Jordan
- Wiz Khalifa
- Kehlani
- Keith Ape
- Kelly Clarkson
- Kelly Key (2001–2007, 2019–present)
- Kenji Wu
- Kevin Gates
- Kep1er
- Chaka Khan
- Kid Abelha (1981–2000)
- Kid Rock
- Kiiara
- Rilo Kiley
- Kill Hannah
- Killswitch Engage
- Kimbra
- Kim Carnes
- Kim Wilde
- Ben E. King
- King Diamond
- Kinga Głyk
- The Kinks
- Kodak Black (Dollaz N Dealz/Sniper Gang/Atlantic)
- Jocie Kok
- Korn
- Kotak (Indonesia)
- Kraftwerk
- Jana Kramer
- Krisko
- Kwabs
- Talib Kweli
- Aaron Kwok
- Khalil Fong
- Kyary Pamyu Pamyu
- Kyle (Indie-Pop/Atlantic)
- Kylie Minogue
- Kyuss
- Kay Trần

== L ==
- Larry June
- Laura Izibor
- Laura Pausini
- Lauriana Mae
- Lakuna
- Lamb of God
- Larry the Cable Guy
- LaViVe
- Lazy Mutha Fucka (Warner Music Hong Kong, Taiwan)
- Leanne & Naara
- Led Zeppelin
- Coco Lee
- Lee Hazlewood
- Leigh-Anne Pinnock
- Jacquie Lee
- Tom Lehrer
- Leon Bolier
- Leslie Grace (Warner/Chappell Music)
- Donna Lewis
- Huey Lewis and the News
- Lewis Watson
- Kelvin Tan Wei Lian
- Li Ronghao
- Life of Agony
- Lifehouse
- Lights
- Lil Durk
- Lil Uzi Vert (Generation Now/Atlantic)
- Lily Allen
- Linda Thompson
- Linkin Park
- Little Boots
- The Living End
- The Living Tombstone
- Loossemble
- Lola Amour
- London Boys
- London Grammar
- Loona
- Loreen
- Lorraine Ellison
- Los Lobos
- Los Prisioneros
- Lostprophets
- Luis Miguel (Singer)
- Luttenberger*Klug
- L.V.
- Lvndscape
- Lykke Li
- Lynyrd Skynyrd
- Lukas Graham
- Lulu Santos
- Luciano Ligabue
- Ludmilla
- Lupe Fiasco
- Lim Hyung Joo
- Shiga Lin
- Lzzy Hale (Via Halestorm)

== M ==
- Timo Maas (non-USA)
- M2M
- Machine Head
- Macklemore & Ryan Lewis
- Madilyn Bailey
- Madina Lake
- Madonna (1982–2010, 2020-onwards)
- The Magician
- The Maine
- Maite Perroni
- Manowar
- Maraaya
- Marcelo Falcão
- Marco Carta
- Marina and the Diamonds
- Mark Ronson (2003–2007)
- Marshmello (Via Spinnin' Records)
- MARUV
- Mastodon
- Matt Duke
- Matt Heafy
- Matt Stone
- Maximum the Hormone
- Megan Thee Stallion
- Miriam Makeba
- Jessi Malay
- Maná
- Teairra Marí
- Ziggy Marley
- Dean Martin
- Matchbox Twenty
- MC Cheung (2021-)
- MC Davo
- MC Solaar
- Travis McCoy
- Michael McDonald
- Sarah McLachlan
- Meese
- Meg & Dia
- Megadeth
- Melanie Martinez
- The Men They Couldn't Hang
- Sérgio Mendes
- Idina Menzel
- Natalie Merchant
- Mercyful Fate
- Meshuggah (Europe, via Nuclear Blast/BMG Rights Management)
- Metallica
- Lucia Micarelli
- Michelle Branch
- Michael Bublé
- Michael Sembello
- Michael Learns To Rock
- Migos
- Luis Miguel
- Milton Nascimento
- Ministry
- Dannii Minogue
- Joni Mitchell
- Mike Shinoda
- Misfits
- Missy Elliott
- Molly Sandén
- Moby
- Mogwai
- Monkees, The
- Monrose
- Heidi Montag
- Morrissey
- Van Morrison
- Motionless in White
- Mötley Crüe
- Motörhead
- Mott the Hoople
- Mr. President
- Muse
- Mutiny Within
- Mutemath
- My Chemical Romance
- Fiona Sit
- Christophe Maé
- Mystery Skulls
- Maggie Lindemann (300 Entertainment)
- Miriam Yeung

== N ==
- Nora Fatehi
- Naff
- Akina Nakamori
- Needtobreathe
- Nek
- Nessa Barrett
- Nevershoutnever
- New York Dolls
- NewJeans
- New Order
- Ney Matogrosso
- Nickelback
- Nico & Vinz
- Nicole Zefanya
- Nicolette Larson
- Stevie Nicks
- Nigel Kennedy
- Nightwish
- Nikhil D'Souza
- Nina Simone
- Nina Sky
- Nine Inch Nails
- Nitty Gritty Dirt Band
- The Notorious B.I.G.
- Nyne Milli

== O ==
- One Day Alive
- O.T. Genasis
- John Oates
- Obituary
- Mariana Ochoa
- The Offspring (1984–1994)
- Of Mice & Men
- Ofra Haza
- Oingo Boingo
- The O'Jays
- Ol' Dirty Bastard
- Olivia Chaney
- Oliver Tree
- Silvia Olari
- Renee Olstead
- Omarion
- Omar Apollo
- One Ok Rock
- Only The Young
- Opeth
- Rita Ora
- Natalia Oreiro
- O Rappa
- Orgy
- OsamaSon
- Otep
- Robyn Ottolini
- Our Lady Peace
- Overkill
- Owsley

== P ==
- Pablo Alboran
- Panic! at the Disco
- Panther Chan
- Paramore
- Parkway Drive
- Pantera
- Sean Paul
- Laura Pausini
- Toni Pearen
- Teddy Pendergrass
- Pendulum
- Pennywise
- Periphery (Sumerian Records)
- Peter Bjorn and John
- Peter, Paul & Mary
- Pet Shop Boys (Parlophone) (return 2017–present catalogue: 1985–2012) (Europe And Rest Of World)
- Phil Anselmo
- Phil Collins
- Phineas and Ferb Soundtrack (only in Singapore and Malaysia)
- Phish
- Piso 21
- P1Harmony
- Pixies
- Plan B
- Plastic Bertrand
- Plies
- Pongsit Kamphee
- P.O.D.
- The Pogues
- Porcupine Tree
- Portugal. The Man
- Daniel Powter
- The Pretenders
- Prince
- Prince Paul
- The Proclaimers (Parlophone/Chrysalis)
- The Prodigy
- PVRIS
- Paulo Londra

== Q ==
- Quarters of Change
- Queen
- Queensberry
- Queensrÿche
- Quest

== R ==
- Ramones (Sire Records)
- Rancid
- Ratt
- RBD
- RED
- R.E.M.
- Leon Redbone
- RedOne
- Red Hot Chili Peppers (since 1991)
- Regina Spektor
- Residual Kid
- Rhiannon Giddens
- Damien Rice
- Rita Ora
- Ritchie Valens
- Richard, Cliff
- Richie Jen
- Rob Thomas
- Robert Plant
- Roberta Flack (until 1996)
- Roberto Frejat
- Robin Beck (East West Germany, 1994)
- Robin Schulz
- Roddy Ricch
- Rohff
- Ronnie James Dio
- Rosé (via Atlantic Records outside South Korea only; Signed by The Black Label)
- Roxette
- Linda Ronstadt
- Rush
- Tom Rush
- Patrice Rushen
- Ruslana
- Rod Stewart
- Rockers Hi-Fi
- Roy Woods
- Rudimental
- Serena Ryder

== S ==
- Saara Aalto
- Sha Ek
- Sally Barker
- Signmark
- David Sanborn
- Adam Sandler
- Hope Sandoval
- Véronique Sanson
- Savage Garden
- Alejandro Sanz
- Sarah Brightman
- Satyricon (Roadrunner Records UK)
- Saweetie
- Peter Schilling
- Scorpions
- Seal
- Dan Seals
- Secondhand Serenade
- Secos & Molhados
- Sepultura
- Serj Tankian
- Sevendust
- The Sex Pistols
- SF9
- Serebro (Indonesian Only)
- Shadows Fall
- The Shadows
- Shane Filan
- Shane Richie
- Ed Sheeran
- Shifty
- Shinedown
- Shila Amzah
- Howard Shore
- Shy'm
- Shutter Boy
- Sia (2017–present)
- Sick of it All
- Silly Fools (2013–2015)
- Silversun Pickups
- Simply Red
- Carly Simon
- Paul Simon
- Nina Simone
- Simple Plan
- Frank Sinatra
- Nancy Sinatra
- Sirenia
- The Sisters of Mercy
- Fiona Sit
- Sixpence None the Richer
- Skid Row
- Skindred
- Skillet
- Skrillex
- Slash
- Slayer
- Sleeping with Sirens
- The Slip
- Slipknot
- The Smashing Pumpkins
- Smile.dk
- The Smiths
- Molly Smitten-Downes
- Phoebe Snow
- Sombr
- Soul Coughing (Slash/Tommy Boy/Warner Bros.)
- Soulfly
- SKAAR (Warner music Norway)
- The Sounds
- Spandau Ballet (Chrysalis/Parlophone)
- Staind
- Starship (Rhino Entertainment)
- Static-X
- Candi Staton
- Stephane Legar (Warner Music France, 2020–present)
- Stereolab
- Steve Aoki
- Al Stewart
- Dave Stewart
- Rod Stewart
- Stone Sour
- Stone Temple Pilots
- The Stooges
- Stooshe
- Story of the Year
- The Sugarcubes
- Sugar Ray
- Sum 41 (Hopeless Records, via ADA)
- The Sundance Kids
- Stefanie Sun (Sun Yanzi)
- Donna Summer
- Gene Summers
- Supergrass
- Superfly
- Keith Sweat
- Sweetbox
- Sweetwater
- Switchfoot (distribution only; Signed by lowercase people records)
- Sofia Reyes

== T ==
- Tamer Hosny (Warner Music MENA/Tamer Hosny Production)
- T Bone Burnett
- Taffy
- Taking Back Sunday
- Taking Dawn
- The Mills
- The Roop
- Tangerine Dream
- Tangier
- Tanita Tikaram
- Tank
- James Taylor
- Team Spirit
- Team Syachihoko
- Tears for Fears
- Teddybears
- Teddy Swims
- Teitur
- Tegan and Sara
- Teresa Sterne
- Teresa Stratas
- Testament
- TGT
- Theory of a Deadman
- Theophilus London
- The Knocks
- The Marias
- The Roop
- They Might Be Giants
- Third Eye Blind
- Thom Sonny Green
- T.I.
- Tia Ray
- Tiësto
- Tigran Hamasyan
- Tigresa del Oriente
- Tim Buckley
- Times of Grace
- Timo Andres
- Tinie Tempah
- Ashley Tisdale
- Tsai Chin (via UFO Record)
- TISM (in Australia for re-releases only)
- Titãs
- Tommy Torres
- Tom Dundee (Thai singer)
- Tom Petty
- Tom Petty and the Heartbreakers
- Tones and I (Bad Batch/Elektra)
- Tom Tom Club
- Tori Amos (1992 - 2001, via Atlantic)
- Toru Takemitsu
- Tove Lo (Warner/Chappell Music)
- Tracy Chapman
- Trapt
- TrÂPhone (F*** HYPE!)
- Trespassers William
- Trey Parker
- Trivium
- Trillville
- Trippie Redd (via 10K Projects / 1400 Entertainment)
- TripleS (Outside South Korea)
- True Tides
- Tucker Beathard
- Tunde Adebimpe
- Twice
- Twista
- Twisted Sister
- Twenty One Pilots
- TAL
- Ty Dolla Sign
- Tyler Joseph
- Tyondai Braxton
- Type O Negative
- Tortur3 T (via Asylum Records)
- Theia (2016–2019), Warner Music New Zealand)

== U ==
- Christopher Uckermann
- The Used
- Ugly God

== V ==
- Valient Thorr
- Vangelis
- Van Halen
- Vanilla Ice
- Jenni Vartiainen
- VersaEmerge
- Versailles
- The Velvet Underground
- The Veronicas
- VideoKids
- Maija Vilkkumaa
- Violent Femmes
- Visions of Atlantis
- Vixen (U.S. via CMC Intl.; UK via Sanctuary)
- Vũ

== W ==
- Tom Waits
- Waka Flocka Flame
- Whirl Eye (Vevo/Warner Music)
- Paul Wall
- Wallows
- Grover Washington Jr.
- We as Human
- Ween
- Westernhagen
- Weezer
- White Lion
- Whitesnake (North American distribution through Atlantic from 1980 to 1982 and Geffen from 1984 to 1990; 1978-1983 catalogue is managed by Parlophone Records; 1984-present catalogue is managed by Rhino Entertainment and Parlophone from 2017 until 2026.)
- Wiley
- John Williams
- Mason Williams
- Winger
- Within Temptation
- Why Don't We
- Wordsworth

== X, Y, Z, #0-100 ==
- X
- X Japan (Warner Music Japan)
- Xavier Dunn (1825/Atlantic)
- Xandria
- Charli XCX
- X.V.
- Rachael Yamagata
- Peter Yarrow
- Yellowcard
- Yellow Claw (Via Spinnin' Records)
- Yellow Magic Orchestra
- Yngwie Malmsteen
- Yo-Yo
- Yolanda Be Cool
- Young the Giant
- Young Thug
- Ylvis
- Yui Aragaki
- Yui Asaka
- Sami Yusuf
- Yung Joc
- Dwight Yoakam
- Warren Zevon
- Zay Hilfigerrr
- Zahara (Warner Music South Africa)
- Zélia Duncan (1994–1998, 2012)
- Zion & Lennox
- Zayion McCall
- ZZ Top
- Tomohisa Yamashita
- Yazz
- Zakk Wylde
- Zaeden
- 1st.One
- 10,000 Maniacs (Elektra Records)
- 3OH!3
- 5 Seconds Of Summer
