= Robert Kyncl =

American business executive (born 1970)

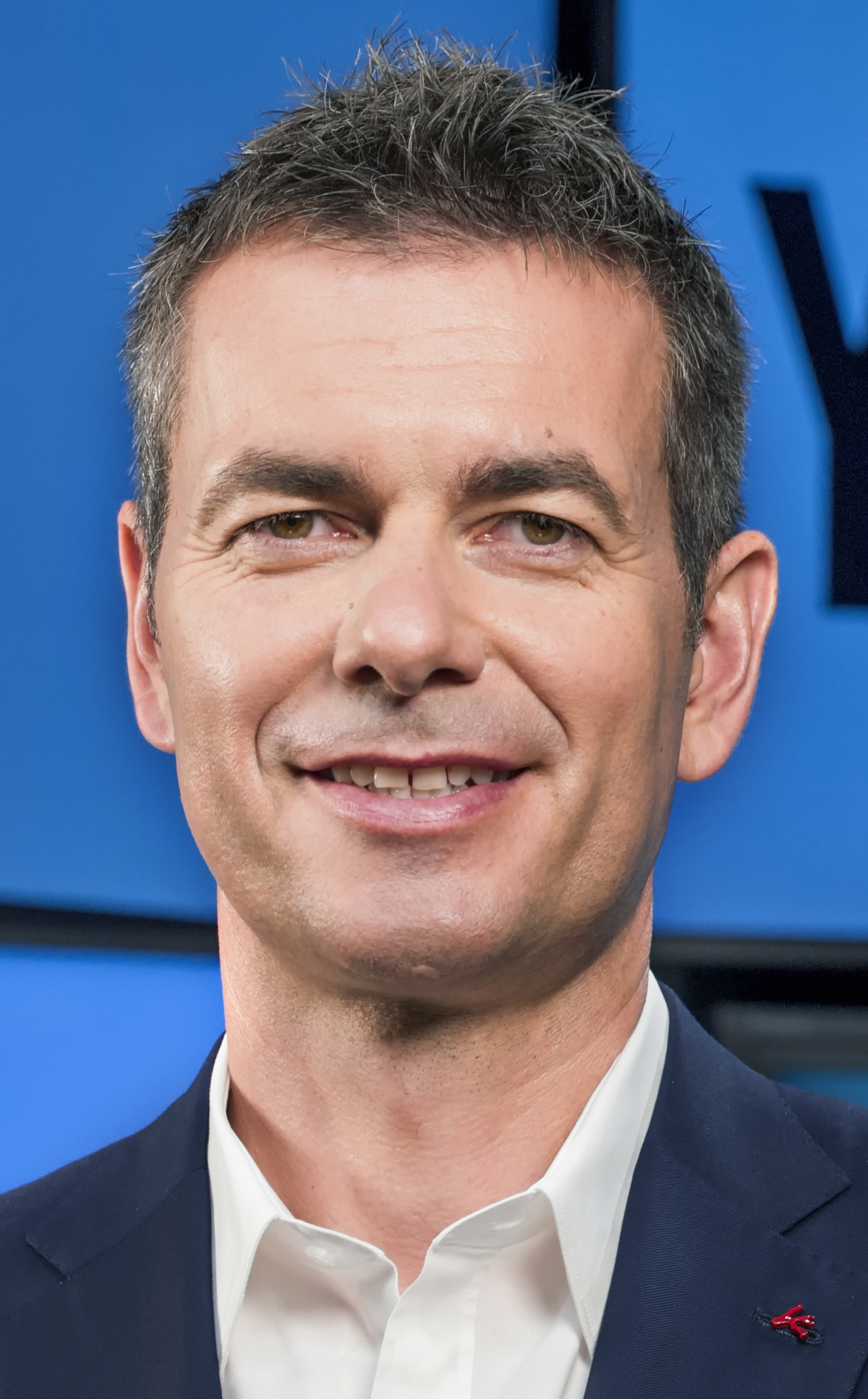
- Born: October 1970 (age 56); Liberec, Czechoslovakia
- Education: State University of New York at New Paltz (BA); Pepperdine University (MBA)
- Spouse: Luz Avila-Kyncl
- Children: 2

Robert Kyncl (born October 1970) is an American business executive. He became the CEO of Warner Music Group on January 1, 2023. He was previously the Chief Business Officer at YouTube where he oversaw all business functions, partnerships and operations. Before YouTube, Kyncl was Vice President of Content Acquisitions at Netflix, where he spearheaded the company's content acquisition for streaming TV shows and movies over the Internet. Mr and Mrs Kyncl reside with their two daughters in Los Angeles and founded Kyncl Family Foundation focused on supporting educational needs of underrepresented communities.

== Early life and education ==
Kyncl was born in October 1970 in Liberec, Czechoslovakia, and received a Bachelor of Arts from the State University of New York at New Paltz and an MBA from Pepperdine University in Malibu, California.

== Career ==
Kyncl entered the entertainment industry with an entry-level position at the Los Angeles talent agency J. Michael Bloom. He later worked at HBO in New York City, then returned to California to join ALFY, a dot-com children's media startup company. In 2003, he joined Netflix, where he was involved in acquiring film content for the company's DVD-by-mail service.

In September 2022, Kyncl was named CEO of Warner Music Group Inc. starting January 1, 2023. Kyncyl and previous CEO Stephen Cooper served as co-CEO for the month of January 2023.

=== Speaking ===
Kyncl represented YouTube in a number of global events throughout 2012 and 2013, including: the 2012 International CES, the 2012 MIPCOM in Cannes, France, the 2012 Abu Dhabi Media Summit, Vidcon, one of the world's first and largest conferences dedicated to the medium of online video, in addition to talks at the Producers Guild of America and Think with Google in Argentina.

Kyncl appeared on popular YouTuber Casey Neistat's channel, in order to discuss the future of YouTube and the Logan Paul controversy. However. this was criticized by thousands of users who argued that he didn't answer many of the questions asked, and also that Casey didn't ask several important questions for the sake of avoiding confrontation.

== Honors and awards ==
Kyncl was listed in Variety's 2012 Dealmakers Impact Report as a "Disruptor", Vanity Fair's New Establishment List in 2013 and 2012, Billboard magazine's Power 100 List in 2015, 2014, 2013, and 2012, Billboard's International Power Players List in 2014, Billboard's Digital Power Players List in 2015, and Adweek's "Top 50 Execs Who Make the Wheels Turn."

On October 18, 2012, CoachArt, a local non-profit that provides arts and athletic lessons for children with chronic and life-threatening illnesses, held their eighth annual Gala of Champions supporting the art of improving lives. The fundraising event was held at the Beverly Hilton was hosted by TV-personality Justin Willman and featured performances from Katrina Parker and Justin Hopkins, contestants on NBC's hit show The Voice. Presenters Dean Norris and Jeffrey Katzenberg honored Kyncl, Google/YouTube Head of Content, with the Heart and Humanity Champion Award and actor Nestor Serrano with the Champion Award of Courage and Hope. The event raised over $825,000 in donations.

== Personal life ==
Kyncl is married to wellness coach Luz Avila-Kyncl, with whom he has two daughters.
