= Cinram =

CD, DVD, Blu-ray disc and VHS cassette manufacturer

Cinram Group Inc.
- Final logo by Interbrand used from 2010 until late 2010s
- Type: Private
- Industry: Optical media
- Founder: Isidore Philosophe and Samuel Sokoloff
- Fate: Acquired, Bankruptcy
- Headquarters: Toronto, Ontario, Canada
- Key people: Steven Brown (CEO) & John Bell (CFO) & Glenn Langberg (CEO)
- Owner: Technicolor SA

Cinram International was a Toronto, Canada-based manufacturer of pre-recorded Blu-ray Discs, DVDs, CD-Audio, CD-ROMs, VHS tapes and audio cassettes. It was an affiliate of the Arizona-based Najafi Companies.

== History ==
Cinram was established in 1969 in a Montreal basement by Isidore Philosophe and Samuel Sokoloff. The company started manufacturing pre-recorded eight-track tapes and cassettes in 1969 in the basement of a commercial building in Montreal. More than three decades later, in 2003, the company completed a US$1.1 billion purchase of the music- and movie-manufacturing assets (WEA Manufacturing) of New York media giant Time Warner. Also that year, it bought the United States manufacturing operations of EMI and, later, Universal Media & Logistics France from Universal Music Group.

Cinram opened its first CD plant in 1987, when records and cassettes were still dominant. In the 1990s, the company started investing in manufacturing operations in Europe, and in 1997, when video-store racks were still filled with VHS tapes, Cinram formed a joint venture with Pacific Ocean Post (POP) to form "Cinram DVD Center POP" and began producing DVDs for movie studios and software CDs.

=== Bankruptcy ===
The company's fortunes began to decline with the rise of online streaming services. In 2010, Cinram lost its major contract for distributing Warner Bros. movies, and its stock began to fall. In 2012, the company sought bankruptcy protection from its creditors in the United States. It was bought by private investment firm Najafi Companies. In 2014, the company ended its manufacturing operations in Toronto. That year, it bought JVC America from JVC Kenwood. In 2015, it shut its Huntsville, Alabama manufacturing plant.

On November 3, 2015, Paris-based Technicolor SA announced that it would acquire Cinram.

In 2017, Cinram closed down its European manufacturing plant at Alsdorf in Germany and in 2018, it shut its Olyphant, Pennsylvania manufacturing plant.
