= A House: Live in Concert =

Live album by A House
- Released: 1998
- Recorded: 1990, 1992
- Genre: Indie
- Label: BBC Music / Strange Fruit Records
- Producer: Jim Lockhart, Jeff Smith

A House chronology
No More Apologies (1996)	A House: Live in Concert (1998)	The Way We Were (2002)

A House: Live in Concert is the sixth album-length release from Irish rock band A House. It is a live album and was released after the band's career had officially ended. Its liner notes include the names of all former members of A House, and the sign off song entitled, “Over and Out. Amen.”

Although issued in 1998, Live in Concert features recordings from an earlier part of the band's career. The first seven tracks were recorded at Delacey House in Cork, Ireland on 18 October 1990— mostly featuring songs from the period of the I Want Too Much album. The show was part of Eurorock 90, an EBU event involving 10 different national radio stations nominating artists, and organised by RTE 2fm with BBC Radio 1. A House was invited to play by 2fm at short notice, as the original choice, upon which Brian Kennedy withdrew. A House had been dropped by their label after release of I Want Too Much. The Cork performance also includes “The Last to Know” which would be included on the Doodlebug EP. This EP was one of the first A House releases on Setanta Records, marking the resurrection of the band's career. The song "Body Blow" is not elsewhere available in A House's recorded catalogue.

The final five tracks were recorded at the Riverside in Newcastle Upon Tyne on 28 May 1992. This is an acoustic set featuring songs from the period I Am the Greatest, A House's first album with Setanta.

== Track listing ==
1. "I Want to Kill Something"
2. "Talking for the Sake of Talking"
3. "I Think I’m Going Mad"
4. "I Want Too Much, Part 3"
5. "The Last to Know"
6. "Body Blow"
7. "Violent Love"
8. "You’re Too Young"
9. "I Lied"
10. "When I First Saw You"
11. "Blind Faith"
12. "Endless Art"
- "A House were David Couse, Fergal Bunbury, Martin Healy, Dermot Wylie, Susan Kavanagh, David Morrissey, Dave Dawson, Liam Crinion, Frank Buckley, Colin Boland, Over and Out Amen"
- Liam Crinion was the band's "long-time roadie, technician and all around top-man". Colin Boland was the band's recording engineer and sound man.*Frank Buckley was the A House driver and Tour Manager.
- Tracks 1–7 recorded at Delacey House, Cork, 18-10-90; produced by Jim Lockhart, engineered by Phil Cook.
- Tracks 8–12 (acoustic set) recorded at Riverside, Newcastle, 28-5-92; produced by Jeff Smith.
