= Féile (music festival) =

Music festival in Ireland, 1990–1997

Féile (Irish pronunciation: [ˈfʲeːlʲə]; "Festival") was a music festival held in the Republic of Ireland between 1990 and 1997, originally known as The Trip to Tipp. The original venue was in Semple Stadium in Thurles, County Tipperary, hence the nicknames of "The Trip to Tipp". In 1995, it was held in Páirc Uí Chaoimh in Cork city; Féile 96 was indoors at the Point Depot in Dublin. Féile was generally a three-day festival held over the bank holiday weekend in early August. In 1996 it was in July; in 1997, it was reduced to a single day in late August.

The festival was a progression from the Siamsa Cois Laoi held in Páirc Uí Chaoimh in the 1980s, and the Slane Concerts at Slane Castle, which had been on hiatus since 1987 but would return from 1992. The Oxegen festival, first held as Witnness at Fairyhouse Racecourse in 2000, was seen as filling the gap left by the ending of Féile, and had the same promoters, MCD. In September 2018 the event took place again, and was known as Féile Classical. A 2-day event at Semple Stadium, was also announced to take place on 20–21 September 2019, and proposed to feature Sinead O'Connor, Sultans of Ping, Therapy? and other Irish acts of the 1990s, under the names "Féile 19" and "Tripp to Tipp Weekender".

== 1990 ==
Meat Loaf & Big Country topped the bill on the Friday night. Hothouse Flowers headlined the Saturday night line-up, although there were acts onstage from midday. The Sunday line-up included Van Morrison. Other acts to perform included Deacon Blue, The 4 Of Us, Mary Black, Big Country, No Sweat, Little Angels, Maria McKee, That Petrol Emotion, Something Happens, Energy Orchard, The Saw Doctors, and Moving Hearts

=== Main stage ===
Friday 3 August	Saturday 4 August	Sunday 5 August
Meat Loaf; Big Country; No Sweat; Thee Amazing Colossal Men	Hothouse Flowers; The 4 of Us; Something Happens; Moving Hearts; That Petrol Emotion; Maria McKee; The Black Velvet Band; The Stunning; The Mere Mortals	Van Morrison; Deacon Blue; Christy Moore; Mary Black; An Emotional Fish; Energy Orchard; The Saw Doctors

== 1991 ==
Acts included Van Morrison, Nanci Griffith, Elvis Costello, The Pogues, Steve Earle, The Las, The Golden Horde, Ride, Happy Mondays, Luka Bloom, Transvision Vamp, The Farm, Something Happens, Marc Cohn, The Mock Turtles, Candy Dulfer, Black Francis, The Stunning, The Fat Lady Sings, The La's, and Paul Brady. The Saw Doctors played again, with Mike Scott of The Waterboys joining them to sing "The Trip to Tipp", which they had co-written for the occasion.

=== Main stage ===
Friday 2 August	Saturday 3 August	Sunday 4 August
Happy Mondays; The Farm; That Petrol Emotion; Ride; Power of Dreams; The Mock Turtles; The Golden Horde; Into Paradise; The Honey Thieves; Shaine	Elvis Costello and the Rude 5; Transvision Vamp; Something Happens; The Saw Doctors; De La Soul; Jimmy Barnes; Paul Brady Band; Black Francis; Billy Bragg; The Fatima Mansions; Dignam & Goff; The Sleepwakers	Van Morrison, Georgie Fame and guests; The La's; Steve Earle; The Black Crowes; Roddy Frame; The Frames; Luka Bloom; The Stunning; Tiberius Minnows; Cry Before Dawn; The Blue Angels; The Pogues; The Wonder Stuff; Nanci Griffith and The Blue Moon Orchestra

== 1992 ==
Acts included Bryan Adams, Simply Red, Christy Moore, David Byrne, Kirsty MacColl, The Wonder Stuff, the Saw Doctors, The Stunning, The Beautiful South, Inspiral Carpets, Primal Scream, PJ Harvey, Ned's Atomic Dustbin, James, Toasted Heretic, and Extreme.

=== Main stage ===
Friday 31 July	Saturday 1 August	Sunday 2 August
The Wonder Stuff; James; The Beautiful South; Carter USM; Primal Scream; The Sultans Of Ping FC; PJ Harvey; Pop Will Eat Itself; Toasted Heretic; Whipping Boy; The Ambition	Simply Red; The Saw Doctors; David Byrne; Shakespears Sister; EMF; Ned's Atomic Dustbin; Inspiral Carpets; Luka Bloom; A House; Therapy?; The Pale; Black 47; Forget-Me-Nots	Bryan Adams; Christy Moore; Extreme; The Stunning; The 4 of Us; Buddy Guy; Del Amitri; Sharon Shannon; Les Négresses Vertes; Kirsty MacColl; Big Geraniums; Precious Stones

== 1993 ==
Acts included INXS, Iggy Pop, The Levellers, The Sultans of Ping FC, The Christians, The Shamen, Kerbdog, A House, The Frank and Walters, Chris de Burgh and a last-minute special-guest addition of The Golden Horde. Unruly behaviour by fans attracted criticism, with 141 arrests, mostly for drug possession, and two rapes reported. The concert reportedly generated IR£300,000 for the Gaelic Athletic Association. There were three stages, and the Jim Rose Circus.

=== Main stage ===
Friday 30 July	Saturday 31 July	Sunday 1 August
Iggy Pop; Therapy?; Stiff Little Fingers; A House; Manic Street Preachers; Spiritualized; ~~Rollins Band~~ An Emotional Fish; Utah Saints; Senseless Things; Kerbdog; The Unbelievable Children; * Special Guests: Teenage Fanclub	INXS; Deacon Blue; The Shamen; The Christians; Levellers; The Frank and Walters; That Petrol Emotion; The Golden Horde; The Fat Lady Sings; Engine Alley; The Auteurs; My Little Funhouse; Eat; Pele; * Special Guests: The 4 of Us	Chris de Burgh; Madness; Mary Black; Björn Again; Christie Hennessy; Inner Circle; Squeeze; The Sultans of Ping FC; Aztec Camera; Indigo Girls; Cooney & Begley; Bronte Bros; * Special Guests: Paul Brady

=== Hot Press Stage ===
Friday 30 July	Saturday 31 July	Sunday 1 August
Jim Rose Circus; Stiff Little Fingers; RDF; Manic Street Preachers; Whipping Boy; Blaggers ITA; The Mary Janes; Pet Lamb; Tree House; The Bonafides	Something Happens; John Mayall & the Bluesbreakers; Barenaked Ladies; The Revenants; Maimin Cajun Band; Pamf	Peacefrog: An Emotional Fish; The Cranberries; Thousand Yard Stare; Rollerskate Skinny; Damn You Peter Pan; Scheer

== 1994 ==
1994 was Féile's final year as an on-grounds camping festival and tagged 'The Last Trip To Tipp'. Acts included The Prodigy, Blur, The Cranberries, Björk, Rage Against the Machine, House of Pain, Kerbdog, Cypress Hill, Grant Lee Buffalo and Aimee Mann amongst others. This was the last year of the initial arrangement with the GAA for the use of Semple Stadium. Objections from locals prevented renewing the arrangement. Televised by MTV, many of the artists stated their praise for the crowd as one of the most electric audiences they'd ever had. Dance music dominated over rock in the lineups.

=== Main stage ===
Saturday 30 July	Sunday 31 July
Crowded House; Primal Scream; House of Pain; The Prodigy; The Beautiful South; The Stunning; Sharon Shannon; Del Amitri; Aimee Mann; Grant Lee Buffalo; Sound Crowd Orchestra	Elvis Costello and The Attractions; The Cranberries; Björk; Cypress Hill; Rage Against the Machine; Crash Test Dummies; Blur; Bob Geldof; Aslan; Yothu Yindi; The 4th Dimension; Kerbdog; Paul Oakenfold; Honky; The Glee Club; Swampshack

== 1995 ==
The Féile name was retained but the concert moved to Páirc Uí Chaoimh in Cork city for 4, 5 and 6 August. The campsite was further from the venue, diminishing the festival atmosphere. Acts included The Prodigy whose performance was disrupted twice by power cuts, The Stone Roses, Orbital, Paul Weller, Elastica, Ash, Black Grape, Dodgy, Blur, Sleeper, The Boo Radleys, The Beautiful South, Tricky, Lush, Moby and The Devlins. Kylie Minogue appeared in the sidebar at an early stage in her transition from teenybopper to dance queen. Free condoms were distributed to concertgoers.

A man, Bernard Rice, was drowned trying to swim across the River Lee to the stadium. The city coroner, Cornelius Riordan, condemned Féile at the inquest, allegedly describing it as "an extravaganza of song, music and sleazy excesses that seem to have cast a hypnotic spell over the youth, as testified by this tragedy". Promoter MCD, and its head Denis Desmond, sued Riordan for slander; the case was settled out of court.

== 1996 ==
Pulp had been scheduled to play a concert at the Point Depot, the largest indoor music venue in Dublin, accommodating 4,500 fans. With no outdoor venue secured for a festival-style Féile, the Point event was expanded into a multi-act weekend, with Pulp headlining on the Saturday. Acts on Friday were Joyrider, The Jesus Lizard, The Afghan Whigs, Beck, Manic Street Preachers, and Foo Fighters. Acts on the Sunday included Alanis Morissette, Frank Black, Mundy and Mazzy Star.

== 1997 ==
The festival returned to Thurles in 1997, reduced to a single day to allay local concerns about unruly campers. It was billed / rebranded as the "Day Trip to Tipp". Acts included The Cardigans, Reef, Foo Fighters, Kula Shaker, Manic Street Preachers, and The Prodigy . No alcohol was on sale in the stadium.

== Féile Classical (2018) ==
A fully seated "Féile Classical" event took place in Semple Stadium during September 2018, hosted by Tom Dunne and featuring the Irish Chamber Orchestra with reappearances by The Stunning, the Hothouse Flowers, An Emotional Fish, Something Happens, The 4 of Us, and the Frank and Walters. A similar event was announced for 2019.

== Féile 19 (2019) ==
In 2019, the 'Tipp Classical' festival was branded as 'Féile '19', and featured a "classic" Feile set up with all the bands playing full sets. The line-up included Sinead O'Connor, Therapy?, Sultans of Ping, The Stunning, EMF and Horslips.
