= Tinsel and Marzipan =

Single by Pugwash

from the album -
- B-side: "Lullaby#1"
- Released: 2006-12-08
- Recorded: 2006
- Genre: Rock
- Length: 3:44
- Label: 1969 Records
- Producers: Thomas Walsh and Keith Farrell

"Tinsel and Marzipan" was a single released by Pugwash and Friends in Ireland in December 2006. All proceeds from the sale of the single were donated to the Irish Epilepsy Association Brainwave. The song, which charted in Ireland at #31 in the first week of its release before eventually moving up to #23, was produced by the band themselves.

The single was promoted by Irish DJ Rick O'Shea who is a patron of Brainwave. Also involved were Neil Hannon, Dave Gregory of XTC, Mundy and Dave Couse.

The B-side of the single is "Lullaby#1", a track originally released on Pugwash's Jollity album.

The single proved to be the first meeting of Thomas Walsh and Neil Hannon who in 2009 formed The Duckworth Lewis Method.

"Tinsel and Marzipan"

== Track listing ==
CD

1. "Tinsel and Marzipan" — 3:44
2. "Lullaby#1" — 2:11
