= No More Apologies =

Studio album by A House
- Released: 1996
- Genre: Indie rock
- Label: Setanta

A House chronology
Wide-Eyed and Ignorant (1994)	No More Apologies (1996)	A House: Live in Concert (1998)

Professional ratings
Review scores
Source	Rating
The Encyclopedia of Popular Music	2/5 stars

No More Apologies is an album from Irish rock band A House. Released in 1996, it was A House's final studio album.

== Reception ==
No More Apologies was generally well received, but reviewers tended to see it as an explicit swansong. Q Magazine gave it four stars (from five) recommending it "for all who love beauty best when it is bruised". NME was much less enthusiastic, awarding 5/10 to "by no means a bad album" which nonetheless seemed flat compared to the "near-masterpiece" that was its predecessor, Wide-Eyed and Ignorant. The Irish Times described an album by a band in a "relaxed and resigned mood ... accepting their fate and lack of fortune with a philosophical air," but still capable of the odd "barbed word" and subtle touches in melody and guitar. AllMusic, awarding the album 3 stars, likewise notes "a band coming to grips with its place in the universe" although "in a better world Couse and company would have become the stars they deserved [sic]" while in the real world, "listeners were still lucky to have them". An elegiacal article in the Irish Times later in the year said "A House is far more important than U2," albeit in the rather special sense that A House's achievement was to survive as a properly Irish rock band which did not disappear, like so many others, under U2's shadow, and actually succeeded in producing a series of "evolving albums culminating" in No More Apologies. The article also notes almost unanimous praise for No More Apologies in Ireland, with the exception of Hot Press, and that Les Inrockuptibles in France had nominated it for album of the year. The Encyclopedia of Popular Music called it "a disappointingly mediocre swansong for such an interesting band."

== Track listing ==
1. "The Start"
2. "Into The Light"
3. "Cry easily"
4. "No More Apologies"
5. "My Sweet Life"
6. "Sisters Song"
7. "Twist & Squeeze"
8. "Love Is....."
9. "Without Dreams"
10. "Just Because"
11. "I Can't Change"
12. "Clotheshorse"
13. "My Mind"
14. "Broken"
15. "A Happy Ending"
