= Pugwash (band) =

Irish pop band

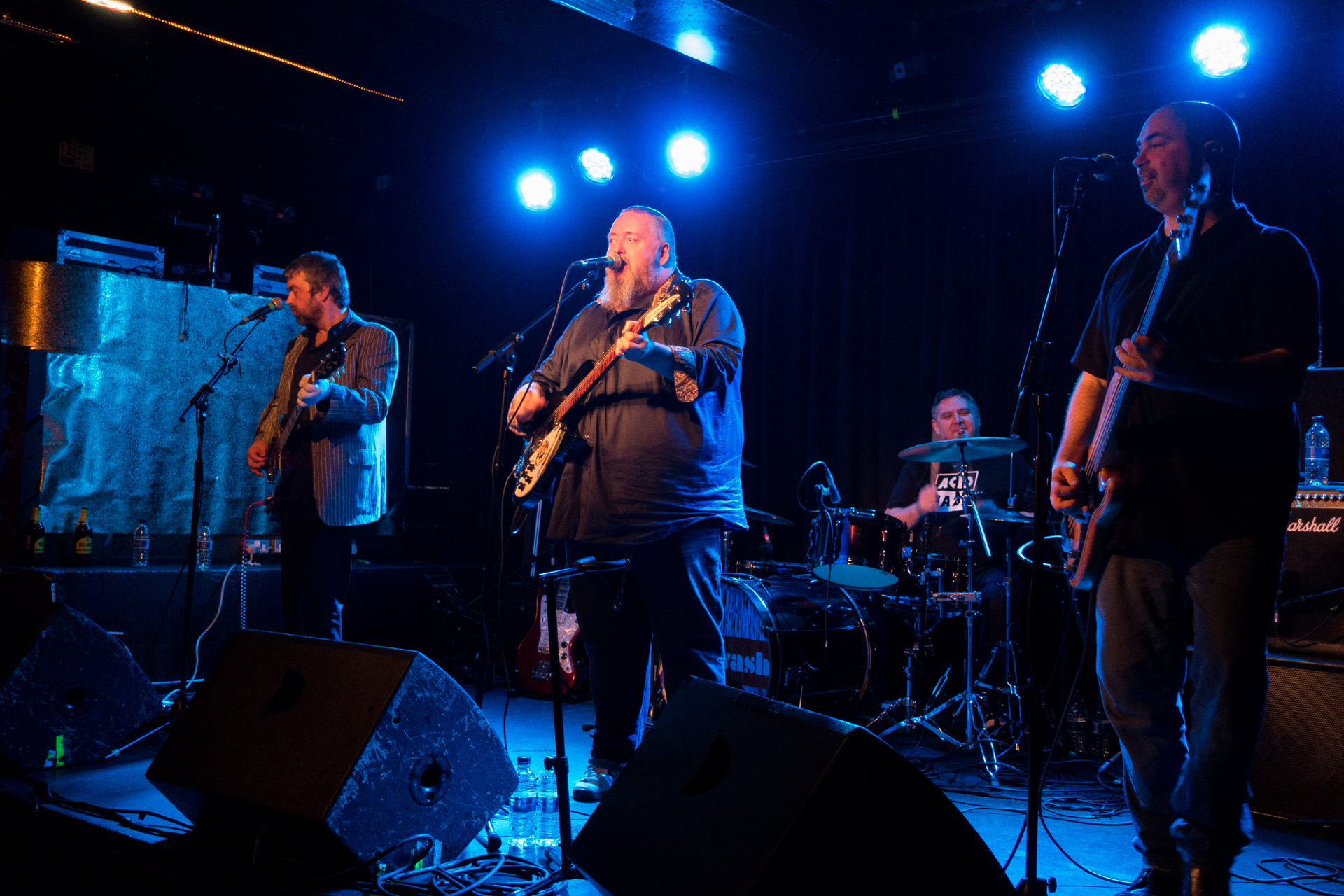
- Pugwash in 2014

Background information
- Origin: Dublin, Ireland
- Genres: Power pop, psychedelic pop, chamber pop, alternative rock
- Years active: 1999–present
- Labels: Lojinx; Omnivore Recordings; EMI; Ape House; 1969 Records; Karmic Hit; Vélo Records
- Members: Thomas Walsh
- Past members: Tosh Flood; Shaun McGee; Joe Fitzgerald; Keith Farrell; Johnny Boyle
- Website: Official site

Pugwash are an Irish pop band fronted by Drimnagh-born musician Thomas Walsh. Pugwash has released six albums since its debut LP Almond Tea in 1999. Influences on the band's sound are regularly cited as including XTC, Electric Light Orchestra and Jeff Lynne, the Beach Boys, the Kinks, Honeybus and the Beatles, though Walsh dismisses the Beatles comparisons as "lazy".

== History ==
Thomas William Patrick Walsh was born in 1969 in Drimnagh, Dublin, Ireland. Using the money from a compensation award following a childhood accident, Walsh set up a recording facility in a shed in his parents' garden. He later claimed he was inspired to do so after hearing that musical hero Andy Partridge of English new wave group XTC had retired from touring and recorded his music at home in a shed. In the early 1990s, Walsh adopted Pugwash as a stage name and began recording some 150 demos to 4-track and, in 1995, one of those was named Demo of the Year by Irish music magazine Hot Press. The recognition led to an introduction to US producer and musician Kim Fowley, who asked Walsh to play guitar for him live and in studio. Fowley then introduced Walsh to Irish singer-songwriter Andy White, with whom Walsh would go on to tour.

Using these as learning experiences, Walsh turned his full attention to writing and recording as Pugwash and in 1997 he signed a record deal with the now defunct Vélo Records. In 1999, Pugwash released debut album Almond Tea, which was co-produced by Walsh and Keith Farrell. Within four weeks of its release it had been placed at No 23 in a list of the top albums of the millennium in Hot Press. Following positive reviews for Almond Tea, Pugwash embarked on a lengthy tour of Ireland, supporting numerous visiting artists including Television and Grant-Lee Phillips.

In 2002, Pugwash released second album Almanac. Again co-produced by Walsh and Farrell and featuring contributions from Air and Beck collaborator Jason Falkner, Almanac was another collection of similarly melodic and retro-styled songs which invited comparisons to classic 1960s and 1970s pop. The album caught the ear of Andy Partridge, who would go on to name the single "Apples" as the most exciting track he had heard that year. Almanac track "Anyone Who Asks" would later be used prominently in the 2008 Hollywood movie Pride and Glory, starring Edward Norton and Colin Farrell. In 2003, Australian label Karmic Hit released a compilation of remastered tracks from the first two Pugwash albums, entitled Earworm. The same year, Pugwash returned to the studio to record a follow-up to Almanac and was involved with the setting up of 1969 Records with Daragh Bohan. The label would go on to release the next two Pugwash albums.

The recording of Pugwash's third album Jollity began after Walsh contacted Dave Gregory of XTC through a friend to ask Gregory to write a string arrangement for a song called "A Rose in a Garden of Weeds". Impressed with the demos Walsh sent him, Gregory readily agreed. Walsh then contacted the Section Quartet, with whom he had previously performed in Dublin, about playing the arrangements and the quartet agreed to a recording session at Studio Two in London's Abbey Road Studios. Gregory was invited to conduct the quartet during the sessions. Gregory also wrote the string arrangement for the song I Want You Back in My Life which appeared on Jollity. This led to Gregory introducing Walsh to Andy Partridge, following which Partridge went on to co-write the song "Anchor" with Walsh. The album would also feature contributions from US artists Eric Matthews, Graham Hopkins (ex-Therapy?), Johnny Boyle (the Frames), Duncan Maitland (formerly of Picturehouse) and Tosh Flood (of Irish band Saville), among others.

Jollity was released on 1969 Records in Ireland on 23 September 2005, and on Karmic Hit in Australia on 10 October 2005. It was met with numerous glowing reviews.

In mid-2006, Pugwash was invited by radio DJ Rick O'Shea to take part in a fund-raising concert in aid of Brainwave, the Irish epilepsy association. While the concert subsequently fell through, Walsh decided to record a charity Christmas single in aid of the association. Walsh invited Eric Matthews, Dave Gregory, Mundy and Dave Couse to take part in the recording of the single. He also contacted Neil Hannon of the Divine Comedy, and Hannon's contribution became the first of many collaborations between him and Walsh. The track "Tinsel and Marzipan" was released under the Pugwash & Friends moniker in December 2006, and reached number 23 in the Irish charts.

Walsh announced he had started recording the follow-up to Jollity in May 2007 and that Keith Farrell and Johnny Boyle were returning as bassist/engineer and drummer respectively, while Stephen Farrell was also assisting. Later that month he revealed the working title of the album was 11 Modern Antiquities and that Neil Hannon was taking part in the recording sessions. Towards the end of the year, the band posted rough versions of a number of tracks and revealed the album was due to be released in February 2008. That date was eventually pushed back to 23 March. The album once again featured contributions from Jason Falkner, Dave Gregory, Eric Matthews, Tosh Flood and the Section Quartet and also included Brian Wilson collaborator Nelson Bragg, acclaimed US singer-songwriter Michael Penn and Andy Partridge. Partridge also co-wrote two of the tracks, "My Genius" and "At the Sea". Eleven Modern Antiquities was once again met with acclaim by critics.

In January 2009, it was announced that Pugwash had signed a five-year deal with Partridge's Ape House label. The band's first release on Ape House was the compilation album Giddy, a collection of songs from Pugwash's four studio albums as selected by Partridge, accompanied by digital download releases of Almond Tea, Almanac and Jollity. A planned expanded CD re-release of Eleven Modern Antiquities was due for release in 2010, but did not materialise. 2011 saw the dissolution of the Pugwash/Ape House contract and its releases withdrawn and deleted.

Following a hiatus during which Walsh recorded and toured as the Duckworth Lewis Method with Neil Hannon and also signed a worldwide publishing deal with Sony/ATV, Walsh announced in August 2010 that a fifth Pugwash album was in progress. The first single from the new album, "Answers on a Postcard", was released in June 2011 to coincide with the announcement that Pugwash had signed to EMI Ireland for the release of the new collection, titled The Olympus Sound.

Pugwash's line-up had now settled as a quartet, featuring Walsh, Tosh Flood, Shaun McGee and Joe Fitzgerald. The Olympus Sound featured guest appearances from Neil Hannon, Dave Gregory and Andy Partridge, as well as US singer Ben Folds on piano. It was released in August 2011 on EMI in Ireland and in March 2012 on Lojinx in the UK and Europe.

A second Duckworth Lewis Method album, Sticky Wickets was released in July 2013, featuring guest performances from Stephen Fry and Daniel Radcliffe, and the band supported Matt Berry on a UK tour. As newer fans of the band emerged, unable to obtain the early material, for limited periods during 2013 and 2014 followers of Walsh's Facebook page were given the opportunity to purchase a limited edition 15th anniversary re-release of Almond Tea (featuring new artwork), plus home-made reprint editions of Almanac (housed in surplus packaging left over from its 2002 release). September 2014 saw a US deal with Omnivore Recordings and a new compilation, A Rose in a Garden of Weeds: A Preamble Through The History of Pugwash, bringing the band to the North American market for the first time. A new album Play This Intimately (As If Among Friends) was released on 4 September 2015.

In 2017, Walsh disbanded the group line-up and returned to being a solo artist under the Pugwash moniker. Walsh announced the seventh album would be recorded in Los Angeles with Jason Falkner in the producer chair. Lojinx released the first single "The Perfect Summer" on 15 September and second single "What Are You Like" on 27 October. The album, titled Silverlake, followed on 24 November.

== Discography ==
=== Studio albums ===
- Almond Tea (1999, limited re-release March 2014)
- Almanac (June 2002)
- Jollity (September 2005)
- Eleven Modern Antiquities (March 2008)
- The Olympus Sound (August 2011)
- Play This Intimately (As If Among Friends) (September 2015)
- Silverlake (November 2017)

=== Live albums ===
- Live in Dublin 2011 (April 2016, limited edition)

=== Compilations ===
- Earworm (2003)
- Giddy (September 2009)
- A Rose in a Garden of Weeds (September 2014)

=== Singles ===
From Almond Tea:

- "The Finer Things in Life" (2000)

From Almanac:

- "Apples" (April 2002)

From Jollity:

- "It's Nice to be Nice" (2005)
- "This Could Be Good" (March 2006)

As Pugwash and Friends:

- "Tinsel and Marzipan" (December 2006)

From Eleven Modern Antiquities:

- "Take Me Away" (February 2008)
- "At the Sea" (2008)

From The Olympus Sound:

- "Answers on a Postcard" (June 2011)
- "Fall Down" (November 2011)

From Silverlake:

- "The Perfect Summer" (September 2017)
- "What Are You Like" (October 2017)

== Awards ==
The Olympus Sound was nominated for the Choice Music Prize in January 2012.

Year	Nominee / work	Award	Result
2012	The Olympus Sound	Irish Album of the Year 2011	Nominated
