= Giddy (album) =

Compilation album by Pugwash
- Released: 29 September 2009
- Genre: Power pop, chamber pop
- Label: Ape Records
- Producer: Thomas Walsh; Keith Farrell

Pugwash chronology
| Eleven Modern Antiquities (2008) | Giddy (2009) | The Olympus Sound (2011) |

Professional ratings
Review scores
| Source | Rating |
|---|---|
| Allmusic | 3.5/5 stars |
| PopMatters | 5/10 stars |
| Sunday Times | 4/5 stars |
| Uncut | 4/5 stars |

Giddy is a compilation album by Irish band Pugwash, featuring tracks from their four previous studio albums. It was released by Ape Records on 29 September 2009.

== Track listing ==
| No. | Title | Writer(s) | Length |
|---|---|---|---|
| 1. | "Apples" | Thomas Walsh | 3:44 |
| 2. | "It's Nice to be Nice" | Walsh | 3:25 |
| 3. | "Song For You" | Walsh | 2:47 |
| 4. | "Anyone Who Asks" | Walsh | 3:51 |
| 5. | "Cluster Bomb" | Walsh | 2:37 |
| 6. | "Sunrise Sunset" | Walsh | 2:18 |
| 7. | "The Season of Flowers and Leaves" | Walsh | 3:41 |
| 8. | "Mono Rail" | Walsh, Keith Farrell | 2:25 |
| 9. | "My Genius" | Walsh, Andy Partridge | 4:02 |
| 10. | "Finer Things in Life" | Walsh | 3:00 |
| 11. | "Black Dog" | Walsh | 3:08 |
| 12. | "Two Wrongs" | Walsh | 3:38 |
| 13. | "Anchor" | Walsh, Partridge, Duncan Maitland | 5:37 |

== Personnel ==
- Thomas Walsh: vocals, backing vocals, organ, acoustic guitar, guitar, percussion, piano, glockenspiel, electric guitar, saxophone, tambourine, brass, sampling, Mellotron, vibes, Chamberlin, shakers, Fender Rhodes, sleigh bells, Wurlitzer, Casio, wobble board, baritone guitar
- Keith Farrell: synthesizer, acoustic guitar, bass guitar, guitar, electric guitar, vocals, backing vocals, brass, Chamberlin, Fender Rhodes, upright bass, fuzz bass, Casio, twelve-string guitar
- Johnny Boyle: percussion, cymbal, drums, drum loop
- Jason Falkner: Vox Continental
- Dave Gregory: piano
- Gerald Eaton: Hammond organ
- Neil Hannon: piano, glockenspiel, vocals, backing vocals, zither, Fender Rhodes
- Graham Hopkins: drums
- Nelson Bragg: percussion, scratching, castanets, conga, shaker, güiro
- Daragh Bohan: guitar
- Stephen Farrell: electric guitar
- Tosh Flood: banjo, backing vocals
- Duncan Maitland: synthesizer, guitar, percussion, piano, harpsichord, vocals, backing vocals, brass, sampling, Mellotron, vibes, Fender Rhodes, Wurlitzer, tack piano, twelve-string acoustic guitar
- Aidan O'Grady: drums
- The Section Quartet: strings
