= The Way We Were (A House album) =

Greatest hits album by A House
- Released: 2002
- Genre: Indie
- Label: Setanta Records

A House chronology
A House: Live in Concert by A House (1998)	The Way We Were (2002)	Genes by Dave Couse (2003)

The Way We Were, fully titled The Way We Were: The Best Of A House 04.85-02.97, is a compilation album released by Irish band A House in 2002. It was released in regular and limited-edition versions; the limited edition, which ran to 3,000 copies and was released only in Ireland, includes a bonus disc of b-sides and rarities. The Way We Were entered the Irish music charts in July 2002 and remained on the chart for four weeks, peaking at number 10.

== Track listing ==
1. "I'll Always Be Grateful"
2. "Love Is"
3. "Endless Art"
4. "Why Me?"
5. "The Comedy Is Over"
6. "13 Wonderful Love Songs"
7. "I Want Too Much"
8. "Here Come the Good Times"
9. "You're Too Young"
10. "I Can't Change"
11. "Kick Me again Jesus"
12. "Call Me Blue"
13. "Small Talk"
14. "I Am Afraid"
15. "Just Because"
16. "Spinster"
17. "Take It Easy On Me"
18. "Our Love Is Good Enough"
19. "No More Apologies"
- All songs written by A House.
- Produced by Edwyn Collins, tracks 3, 9, 14, 16–18.
- Produced by Mike Hedges, tracks 6, 7, 13.
- Produced by Mike Hedges and Ian Grimble, tracks 2, 10, 15, 19.
- Produced by Steve Lovell and Steve Power, tracks 1, 12.
- Produced by Phil Thornalley, tracks 4, 5, 8.
- Produced by Chris O'Brien and A House, track 11.

=== Bonus disc ===
1. "Freakout"
2. "Rock & Roll"
3. "I Love You"
4. "My Heart Bleeds"
5. "A Minute of Your Time"
6. "Everything's Wrong"
7. "Snowball Down"
8. "Y.O.U."
9. "More Endless Art" (Alt)
10. "When I Change"
11. "When I Last Saw You"
