= The World Should Know (Couse and the Impossible album) =

Studio album by Couse and the Impossible
- Released: October 31, 2005
- Label: 1969 Records nice 0004
- Producer: Dave Couse

Couse and the Impossible chronology
Genes (2003)	The World Should Know (2005)	Alonewalk (2010)

The World Should Know is the second album released Dave Couse (or more specifically, Couse and The Impossible) since the breakup of A House, and his first on 1969 Records. Rather than being solely credited to Dave Couse, the record is credited to Couse and the Impossible. Couse received nominations for "Best Album" and "Best Irish Male" for the 2006 Meteor Music Awards. The album was initially released in Ireland in 2005, and then received a UK release in 2006.

== Track listing ==
1. "A Celebration"
2. "Batman And Robin"
3. "Beauty Is"
4. "The Right Choice"
5. "***** [stars]"
6. "Celebrity"
7. "Fakers"
8. "As The Colours"
9. "The World Should Know"
10. "I Have Lived"
11. "All I See"
12. "Into You"
13. "Little Darlin'" (features Briana Corrigan)

(All songs written by Couse except "Little Darlin'", written by Couse and Corrigan.)
