= Wide-Eyed and Ignorant =

Album by A House

Studio album by A House
- Released: 1994
- Genre: Indie
- Label: MCA, Radioactive, Setanta/Parlophone
- Producer: Edwyn Collins, Phil Thornalley, Clive Langer and Alan Winstanley

A House chronology
I Am the Greatest (1990)	Wide-Eyed and Ignorant (1994)	No More Apologies (1996)

Wide-Eyed and Ignorant is the fourth album by the Irish rock band A House, released in 1994. It contains the single "Here Come the Good Times", which was A House's only entry in the UK top 40, peaking at number 37. "Everything I Am" includes a spoken word section.

== Critical reception ==
Professional ratings
Review scores
Source	Rating
AllMusic	4/5 stars
Entertainment Weekly	A−

Entertainment Weekly determined that "the catchiest choruses on the fourth album by these brassy Irish folk-popsters raise gooseflesh the way the Pogues and Violent Femmes could in their prime." The Guardian opined that the band's "gift for strong melodies and playful lyrics ... is constantly undermined by tuneless vocals." The Hamilton Spectator wrote: "A bright mixture of folk-based pop and rolling rhythms, spiced with Dave Couse's sardonic vocals, A House always provides an interesting twist on human yearning."

== Track listing ==
All tracks are written by A House.

No.	Title	Length
1.	"Intro"	1:28
2.	"Here Come the Good Times"	3:33
3.	"She Keeps Me Humble"	3:56
4.	"Why Me?"	3:20
5.	"Make Me Proud"	3:17
6.	"Everything I Am"	3:34
7.	"Curious"	3:43
8.	"These Things"	2:36
9.	"The Comedy Is Over"	3:31
10.	"The Strong and the Silent"	3:25
11.	"Big Talk"	2:46
12.	"Deadhead"	2:58
13.	"I Want to Be Allowed to Love You"	2:57

=== Alternative track listing (U.S.) ===
Released in 1995 with a different cover.

1. "The Strong and the Silent" (3:25)
2. "She Keeps Me Humble" (3:58)
3. "Why Me?" (3:22)
4. "Curious" (3:46)
5. "Make Me Proud" (3:24)
6. "Everything I Am" (3:39)
7. "Picture A House" (1:28)
  - This is the same track as "Intro" on the UK release.
8. "Here Come the Good Times" (3:36)
9. "The Comedy Is Over" (3:37)
10. "Because You Love Me" (2:54)
11. "Spinster" (3:19)
12. "These Things" (2:38)

== Personnel ==
- Fergal Bunbury - guitar
- Dave Couse - vocals, guitar
- Dave Dawson - drums
- Martin Healy - bass
- Susan Kavanagh - backing vocals
- David Morrissey - keyboards, backing vocals
- Edwyn Collins - production, Spanish guitar, harmonica, keyboards
