= Keith Cullen =

Keith Cullen may refer to:

- Keith Cullen (author) (born 1968), Irish author and record label founder
- Keith Cullen (runner) (born 1972), British long-distance runner
