= I Am the Greatest (A House album) =

- UK and Irish cover art

Studio album by A House
- Released: 1991
- Recorded: 1991
- Genre: Indie rock
- Length: 51:35
- Label: Radioactive, MCA, Setanta
- Producer: Edwyn Collins

A House chronology
I Want Too Much (1990)	I Am the Greatest (1991)	Wide-Eyed and Ignorant (1994)

Singles from I Am the Greatest
- 1. "Endless Art" Released: 1992; 2. "Take It Easy on Me" Released: 1992

I Am the Greatest is the third album from Irish rock band A House and features the fan favorite track, "Endless Art".

== Reception ==
Professional ratings
Review scores
Source	Rating
Allmusic	3/5 stars
Q	4/5 stars
Vox	8/10 stars

At the time of its release, I Am the Greatest was very well reviewed, but sometimes the album was also marvelled at for its very existence. After their second album, I Want Too Much, had been a commercial failure (despite critical plaudits) A House had been dropped by their record label and many doubted that they could continue. However, they refused to give up and, helped out by Setanta Records, produced an album almost universally assessed as a triumph: musically, lyrically, and perhaps especially in terms of the band's attitude, as A House refused to compromise their own idiosyncratic standards in the face of such limited commercial success, thereby somehow managing to reawaken music, at least according to some: "[t]he single Endless Art, is quite unlike anything else you'll hear this year, and the title track fairly quivers with indignation. 'Whatever happened to good music? Remember the days you could feel it, it was almost sexual...'" That title track was "unforgettable ... a systematic, blow-by- blow destruction of the music business and the state of the nation coupled with a dramatic determination not to give in".

City Limits was "mightily impressed with this headlong maelstrom of angst, bluster and corking ideas". Melody Maker said I Am the Greatest was "a gigantic musical achievement and an astonishing comeback, ... the ultimate KO". Irish music magazine Hot Press observed the underwhelming apathy that had greeted A House's previous efforts, and how often they had been paddle-less up commercial creeks, only to marvel that they had returned "with a record more cohesive and infinitely more glorious than anyone could have hoped ... one of the most cherishable pieces of black vinyl you could ever hope to own", an album which raised the possibility that "A House are the finest band Ireland has produced", deserving of a statue in O'Connell Street.

== Later evaluations ==
By 2004, Hot Press's enthusiasm had waned somewhat, although the magazine still ranked I Am the Greatest 29th out of 100 on their list of "Greatest Irish Albums". In the same year, a reader poll on the music website CLUAS put the record at 16th on an all-time list of Irish records.

In 2008, a poll of the staff rock critics of the Irish Times rated I Am the Greatest as the third best Irish album of all time (jointly with Ghostown by The Radiators). This put it behind only Loveless by My Bloody Valentine and Achtung Baby by U2. Tony Clayton-Lea wrote that "some would say A House were the best Irish band of the past 30 years, surpassing the usual suspects list by virtue of their uncompromising nature, provocative lyrical stance and perversely discordant approach" so that, on I Am the Greatest, "even after almost 20 years, the impact of songs as emotionally strong and raw as You're Too Young, When I First Saw You, I Am Afraid, I Lied and the spoken-word title track leave the listener wondering how much more they can take".

== Trailblazer Award and A House Is Dead concert (2019) ==
In 2019, I Am the Greatest was awarded the second annual NCH/IMRO Trailblazer Award, which celebrates "seminal albums by iconic Irish musicians, songwriters and composers" (the first award, in 2018, went to The Clock Comes Down the Stairs by Microdisney). I Am the Greatest was described as an "iconic album" and "one of the finest Irish albums ever released", by Keith Johnson of IMRO, and as a big, powerful, funny and poetic" record that contains everything, "joy, turmoil and hope", by Gary Sheehan of the NCH. Because of the award, Dave Couse and Fergal Bunbury came back together with a backing band (and their respective daughters as special guests on the track "I Am Afraid") to perform the entirety of the album in the National Concert Hall in Dublin on June 29, 2019. Hot Press reviewed the concert as by turns full of umbrage, mellow, uplifting, "visceral and scathing", and "exultant and emotional", the audience as a "baying mob" greedy for more. Other reviews agreed that the music of I Am the Greatest "still sounded as fresh and vital as it did when it was first released" and that "a night dripping with joyful nostalgia" contained "spine-tingling" moments and "reinforced just why I Am the Greatest is an album most deserving of the Trailblazer Award and why we have missed A House so very, very much". The concert was titled "A House Is Dead: I Am Still the Greatest" and the version of "Endless Art" was updated to include many artists who have died since the song was first released, notably including a band named "A House", but notably not including David Bowie; however, the band played a snatch of Ziggy Stardust – rather than Beethoven – to close the song. The success of this concert prompted a follow-up, in Vicar Street in December, reviewed by Hot Press as a triumph.

== Track listing ==
1. I Don't Care
2. You're Too Young
3. Endless Art
4. Blind Faith
5. Cotton Pickers
6. How Strong Is Love
7. When I First Saw You
8. I Am Afraid
9. Victor
10. Take It Easy on Me
11. Creatures of Craze
12. Slipping Away
13. I Wanted Too Much
14. I Lied
15. Live Life Dead Die
16. I Am the Greatest
- All songs by A House
- Produced by Edwyn Collins
