= Belinda Stewart-Wilson =

British actress

- Born: Belinda Anthea Stewart-Wilson; 16 April 1971 (age 55); Kensington, London, England
- Education: Webber Douglas Academy of Dramatic Art
- Years active: 1993–present
- Spouse: Ben Miller (m. 2004; div. 2011)
- Children: 1
- Father: Sir Blair Stewart-Wilson

Belinda Anthea Stewart-Wilson (born 16 April 1971) is a British actress who is best known for her role as Polly McKenzie in The Inbetweeners (2008–2010).

== Early life ==
Belinda Anthea Stewart-Wilson was born on 16 April 1971 in Kensington, the youngest of three daughters of Lieutenant-Colonel Sir Blair Stewart-Wilson, a British Army officer, and his wife, Helen Mary Fox. Stewart-Wilson grew up on military postings in the UK, Germany, and Austria before her family settled in London, her father becoming an Equerry to Queen Elizabeth II. She was educated at St Mary's School, Calne, in Calne, Wiltshire, and Hurst Lodge School in Berkshire, before completing a three-year degree in classical acting at the Webber Douglas Academy of Dramatic Art, in London.

== Career ==
Stewart-Wilson's first main television role was in the series Shine on Harvey Moon, a show based in post-war London. Her next two roles were one-time appearances in the British sitcom Goodnight Sweetheart and playing a secretary in a TV adaptation of Agatha Christie's Poirot story "The Murder on the Links".

From there, Stewart-Wilson went on to play roles in British sitcoms Days Like These and Starting Out as well as Kiss Kiss (Bang Bang), a feature film starring Chris Penn and Stellan Skarsgård. She also played Dina in La Passione, a feature film based on the life of Chris Rea, which opened the London Film Festival in 1997.

In 2004, she made an appearance in the long-running British medical drama Holby City, before moving on to two satirical programmes: making an appearance in Look Around You, which won the Rose d'Or award for best comedy, as well as in three episodes of the 24-hour-news-mocking Broken News.

Throughout 2007 and 2008, Stewart-Wilson worked on a number of television shows. Her most notable credits were the roles of Barbara Reynholm, the wife of Denholm Reynholm, in The IT Crowd, and Nikki in the TV series Jekyll, alongside James Nesbitt and Gina Bellman. She also made an appearance in the mockumentary feature film Razzle Dazzle: A Journey into Dance, and played a cameo role in Stephen Poliakoff's Joe's Palace in a scene with Michael Gambon.

In 2007, Belinda played various roles in The Peter Serafinowicz Show, going on to appear in The Peter Serafinowicz Show Christmas Special in 2008 which was nominated for a Bafta for Best Comedy in 2009. A "best of" compilation was also aired in 2008.

Between 2008 and 2010, she played Will McKenzie's mother Polly (known among Will's friends as his "fit mum") in The Inbetweeners, the multi-award-winning sitcom which was nominated for a BAFTA Award for "Best Sitcom" in 2009, and won the BAFTA audience award in 2010. It also won most popular comedy programme at the National Television Awards in 2011. Stewart-Wilson also appears in The Inbetweeners Movie and its sequel, which were both box office successes. She also played the recurring role of Christine Johnson in the third series of the cult science-fiction show Primeval.

In 2010, she once again appeared in The IT Crowd, this time playing Victoria Reynholm, the wife of Douglas (Denholm Reynholm's son, played by Matt Berry, making her the daughter-in-law of her previous character), who mysteriously vanished two weeks into their marriage whilst washing the car.

In August 2010, Irish band Pugwash announced that they would be including a song called "Dear Belinda" on their album The Olympus Sound, the track being written as a tribute to Stewart-Wilson for her 40th birthday. Pugwash frontman Thomas Walsh (also of The Duckworth Lewis Method) added that Stewart-Wilson had requested that she appear on the final version of the song.

Between 2011 and 2014, Stewart-Wilson appeared in the critically acclaimed TV film about Monty Python, Holy Flying Circus, as well as the period drama Ripper Street. She also played Nancy in Robert B. Weide's Mr. Sloane, alongside Nick Frost.

In 2015, Stewart-Wilson played Alison, wife of Mike (played by Max Beesley), in five episodes of the BBC drama Ordinary Lies.

Stewart-Wilson appeared as American Fiona Crossley in 25 episodes of Disney's production of The Evermoor Chronicles on The Disney Channel (2014–2016).

In 2015, Stewart-Wilson appeared alongside Toby Jones, playing his wife, Alice, in a Radio Play for BBC Radio 4 called "The Len Continuum" by Peter Strickland.

In 2018, Stewart-Wilson had a recurring role in series 32 and 33 of Casualty, appearing in several episodes as Ciara Cassidy, fellow alcoholic and love interest of consultant doctor Dylan Keogh.

== Personal life ==
Stewart-Wilson was married to comedian, actor, and author Ben Miller, until they divorced in 2011. They have a son.

== Filmography ==
=== Film ===
| Year | Title | Role | Notes |
|---|---|---|---|
| 1994 | Four Weddings and a Funeral | Wedding Singer | |
| 1996 | Larger Than Life | Fake Linda | Uncredited role |
| 1996 | La Passione | Dina | |
| 2001 | Kiss Kiss (Bang Bang) | Camilla | |
| 2007 | Razzle Dazzle: A Journey into Dance | Meredith | |
| 2010 | Huge | Yummy Mummy | |
| 2011 | All That Way for Love | Kate - Wife | Short film |
| 2011 | The Inbetweeners Movie | Polly McKenzie | |
| 2014 | The Inbetweeners 2 | Polly McKenzie | |
| 2014 | Gregor | Mandy | |
| 2016 | The Brother | Tabitha | |
| 2018 | Peripheral | Jordan | |
| 2020 | Reappear | Alice | Short film |
| 2021 | Everything I Ever Wanted to Tell My Daughter About Men | Eve | |
| 2023 | Licence to Love | Elizabeth | |

=== Television ===
| Year | Title | Role | Notes |
|---|---|---|---|
| 1993 | If You See God, Tell Him | Gas UK Shower Girl | Mini-series; episode 2 |
| 1995 | Shine on Harvey Moon | Dilys Perkins | Series 5; episodes 6 & 8 |
| 1996 | Agatha Christie's Poirot | Dubbing Secretary | Series 6; episode 3: "Murder on the Links" |
| 1996 | Goodnight Sweetheart | Vanessa | Series 3; episode 10: "The Yanks Are Coming" |
| 1999 | Days Like These | Sally | Episode 7: "Grandma's Dead" |
| 1999 | Starting Out | Becky | Episodes 1 & 5 |
| 2003 | Georgian Underworld | Kate Cook | Episode 2: "Invitation to a Hanging" |
| 2004 | Holby City | Jo Wheeler | Series 6; episode 25: "Under Pressure" |
| 2005 | Look Around You | Patricia | Series 2; episode 5: "Computers" |
| 2005 | Broken News | Amanda Panda | Mini-series; episodes 3, 4 & 6 |
| 2006 | Seven Second Delay | Vi | Television film |
| 2007 | The IT Crowd | Barbara Reynholm | Series 2; episodes 1 & 2: "The Work Outing" & "Return of the Golden Child" |
| 2007 | Party Animals | Caroline Northcote | Episode 5 |
| 2007 | Jekyll | Nicki | Mini-series; episodes 1 & 4 |
| 2007 | The Whistleblowers | Sian McKee | Episode 3: "No Child Left Behind" |
| 2007 | Joe's Palace | Party Woman | Television film |
| 2007 | Angelo's | Diane | Episodes 1 & 5 |
| 2007, 2008 | The Peter Serafinowicz Show | Various characters | Episodes 1–6 (2007) & Christmas Special (2008) |
| 2008 | Bremner, Bird and Fortune | Quiz Show Contestant | Series 12; episode 2 |
| 2008–2010 | The Inbetweeners | Polly McKenzie | Series 1–3; 10 episodes |
| 2009 | Primeval | Christine Johnson | Series 3; 6 episodes |
| 2010 | The IT Crowd | Victoria Reynholm | Series 4; episode 6: "Reynholm vs Reynholm" |
| 2010 | Whites | Lisa | Episode 2 |
| 2010 | New Tricks | Sarah Levene | Series 7; episode 6: "Fashion Victim" |
| 2010 | The Armstrong & Miller Show | Various characters | Series 3; episode 1 |
| 2010 | Miranda | Stinky | Series 2; episode 1: "The New Me" |
| 2010 | Popatron | Pamela Craven | Episode 4 |
| 2010 | The Morgana Show | French Teacher | Episode 3 |
| 2010 | The Impressions Show with Culshaw & Stephenson | Various characters | Series 2; episodes 3–5 |
| 2011 | How TV Ruined Your Life | Sophie Dahl | Mini-series; episode 3: "Aspiration" |
| 2011 | My Family | Twyla Curtis | Series 11; episode 10: "Susan for a Bruisin'" |
| 2011 | Holy Flying Circus | Nun / Montage Woman | Television film |
| 2011 | Little Crackers | Hilary Whitehall | Series 2; episode 2: "Jack Whitehall's Little Cracker: Daddy's Little Princess" |
| 2013 | Citizen Khan | Dr. Anne | Series 2; episode 3: "Amjad's Health Check" |
| 2013 | Ripper Street | Prudence Quint | Series 2; episode 5: "Threads of Silk and Gold" |
| 2014 | Mr. Sloane | Nancy | Episode 4: "Merry Christmas, Mr. Sloane" |
| 2014 | The Inbetweeners Go Global | Herself | Television film |
| 2014–2016 | The Evermoor Chronicles | Fiona Crossley | Episodes 1–9 & 11–24 |
| 2015 | Ordinary Lies | Alison | Series 1; episodes 2–4 & 6 |
| 2015–2017 | French Collection | Herself - Narrator | Series 2 & 3; 50 episodes |
| 2016 | Hetty Feather | Dr. Kate Webster | Series 2; episode 7: "Dreams" |
| 2017–2018 | Sick Note | Annette Glennis | Series 1 & 2; 8 episodes |
| 2018 | Casualty | Ciara Cassidy | Series 32; episode 26, & series 33; 8 episodes |
| 2018 | Counterpart | Young Charlotte Burton | Season 2; episode 4: "Point of Departure" |
| 2019 | The Inbetweeners: Fwends Reunited | Herself | Television Special |
| 2021 | Stay Close | Sarah Green | Mini-series; episodes 1, 2 & 5 |
| 2022 | Toast of Tinseltown | Bellender Bojangles | Episode 4: "Doctor Grainger" |

=== Video games ===
| Year | Title | Role |
|---|---|---|
| 2017 | Mass Effect: Andromeda | Raelis / Voliir / Daarfre / Port Captain Arjen / Venro / Aya Immigration Officer / Aya Agricultural Scientist / Aya Citizen (voice) |
| 2019 | Anthem | Marelda (voice) |
| 2020 | World of Warcraft: Shadowlands | (Additional voices) |
| 2024 | Dragon Age: The Veilguard | Shathann the Qunari Linguist (voice) |
