= Dave Couse =

- Born: 1965 (age 60–61); Tallaght, Ireland
- Genre: Alternative rock
- Occupations: Singer-songwriter, musician and radio presenter
- Instruments: Vocals, guitar, piano
- Years active: 1985–present
- Labels: Solo: Beep-Beep, 1969 Records; With A House: Blanco y Negro Records, Setanta Records

Dave Couse (born 1965) is an Irish musician, producer, and radio presenter best known for being the lead singer and main songwriter with the band A House.

Couse has also released three albums as a solo artist.

== Early career and A House ==
Couse was born in Perrystown, Dublin in 1965. He met some of his future bandmates while attending school in Templeogue College and formed the band Last Chance.

The disintegration of Last Chance gave birth to A House which consisted of Couse on vocals and guitar, Martin Healy on bass, Dermot Wylie on drums, and Fergal Bunbury on guitar. A House's earliest appearance on record appears on Live at the Underground (UK, 1986) alongside other up and coming bands such as Something Happens and The Stars of Heaven, while their first single release was "Kick Me Again Jesus" in 1987. The band would endure for over a decade, during all of which time Couse, Healy, and Bunbury remained as core members. Bunbury still frequently collaborates with Couse.

A House released five albums, as well as singles and EPs. After their second album, I Want Too Much, released in 1990, the band were dropped by their label, Blanco y Negro Records, and picked up by Setanta Records. As well as enabling A House to continue, this signing led to Couse developing a strong collaborative and personal bond with Edwyn Collins, and to an enduring relationship also with The Frank and Walters, all of whom were with Setanta at that time. A House never experienced more than sporadic commercial success and eventually decided to call it quits in 1997, bowing out with a farewell concert at the Olympia Theatre, Dublin in February.

== 1997 to 2003 ==
After the break-up of A House an apparent hiatus followed for Couse. In fact, he was working on several collaborative projects. The detailed A House and Dave Couse discography at ZOP states that Couse and Bunbury worked on a project together in 2000, under the name Lokomotiv, recording an unreleased album titled the eighteenth Sunday in ordinary time, and that Couse also produced an album's worth of material with Briana Corrigan, formerly of the Beautiful South. However, almost none of Couse's work from this period has ever seen the light of day. The exception is one single by Lokomotiv, "Next Time Round" (UK, 2000) which featured Corrigan on backing vocals on the A-side, and Úna O Boyle of ambient-trance-dance band Hyper[borea] on lead vocals on the B-side, "Intercourse with the World". (Note: Some more tracks by Lokomotiv would eventually show up as free downloads on Couse's (now defunct) website www.davecouse.com – see the singles discography.)

Otherwise, Couse was not much heard of until 2002 when a retrospective A House compilation (The Way We Were) was released, and the A House/Couse song Here Come the Good Times was successfully re-recorded as a charity single by members of the Irish soccer squad and other Irish celebrities in the run up to the 2002 World Cup.

== Solo musical career ==
=== Genes ===
In 2003, his first solo record was released. This was Genes, which appeared on Couse's own label, Beep-Beep. Recorded with production help from Edwyn Collins, the record is self-described as a "somewhat introspective affair". The production received some criticism, especially for losing Couse's lyrics in its murky sound, but the album's real difficulty lay in its thematic focus on the death of Couse's father, leading to a morose atmosphere that was not always musically successful. Couse said later that he had not been fully ready to deal with his fresh grief while working on the album, so it is perhaps not surprising that the record's highlight for many is a powerful version of someone else's song about attachment and loss, John Cale's Close Watch. The album artwork features photos of Couse and of his father (and its title is self-evident). Despite its problematic nature, there were positive reviews for Genes in Ireland, some even commenting on Couse's continuing ability to write perkily askew, breezy pop songs. In live performances at this time Couse was usually accompanied by Simon Quigley on keyboards.

Genes did not sell very well and Couse was dispirited, as his live gigging had not been particularly successful either. He had thought that as a solo artist he would pick up something of an instant audience from the body of A House fans, but this did not work out because of the apparently fallow period before 2003, although he had received a fillip through the 2002 releases of The Way We Were and Here Come the Good Times. Then Genes was a record defined by Couse's personal need to deal with depression stemming from career uncertainty and his father's death, as well as more optimistic but overwhelming events, like the birth of his daughter. However, by 2005 Couse was ready to meet the world again, and in October he released The World Should Know.

=== The World Should Know ===
Recorded with a band, The World Should Know is officially credited to Couse and The Impossible. More user-friendly and with a bigger, catchier sound than Genes, it was nominated for "Best Album" at the 2006 Meteor Awards and Couse was nominated for "Best Irish Male". The record went on to a get full UK release and spawned a number of singles. The line up of Couse and The Impossible was Couse on vocals and guitar with Simon Quigley (keyboards), Mike O'Dowd (drums), Pete Meighan (guitar), and Dave Flynn (Bass Guitar); the group had broken up by 2007.

One of the singles from The World Should Know was "A Celebration". Released in 2006, the single also included an updated version of the A House classic "Endless Art", which replaced the names of the deceased artists in the original with some of those who had passed since the song's original appearance in 1990. This limited edition CD is now highly sought after on the Dublin music trading scene.

In 2007 on the 10th anniversary of the final A House concert, Couse and Fergal Bunbury reunited once more for a well-received gig at Dublin's Sugar Club. Joined by Rike Soeller on cello, Couse displayed newly honed piano skills whilst treating the audience to a selection of A House/Couse classics in a style that foreshadowed the style eventually to be showcased on the record Alonewalk.

=== Alonewalk ===
On 2 April 2010 Couse released his album Alonewalk on Dublin label 1969 Records. One of the songs on Alonewalk is titled "Good Friday" which is why the release date of 2 April (Good Friday in 2010) was chosen. The Irish Times described the album as unlikely to appeal to a younger generation because Couse is a "middle-aged maker of music the polar opposite of what passes for pop these days" but because of the lyrical sophistication and honesty of this singular and brave songwriter the record is "so affecting and so good". Musically it is based in a palette of piano and cello, Couse being again helped out by Bunbury and Soeller. There is also a guest contribution from Cathal Coughlan of The Fatima Mansions, who sings "Good Friday". Alonewalk was mastered by Bob Ludwig.

== Other activities ==
=== Producer ===
Couse also works as a producer, mainly (apart from his own and A House's records) for The Frank and Walters, from their album The Frank and Walters in 1991, when A House and The Frank and Walters were label mates on Setanta Records, through their 2006 record A Renewed Interest in Happiness.

=== Radio DJ ===
Couse previously presented his own radio show "The Lighthouse" on Irish radio station Today FM every Sunday evening. He tried to approach his "little" show with the excitement of a music fan being allowed to play music to other music fans. The Lighthouse was subsequently axed in March 2014. Despite that, Couse continues to work for Today FM, having stood in for Tom Dunne on Dunne's "Pet Sounds" when Dunne was off holidays or off covering for another Today FM radio presenter such as Ray D'arcy or Ian Dempsey. In the 1980s, both Dunne and Couse occupied similar roles in both the Dublin and Irish music scenes, Dunne with Something Happens (band) and Couse with A House. These days, Couse regularly fills in for Dunne's replacement, Paul McLoone and who had previously worked as a producer on Dunne's "Pet Sounds" show on McLoone's very popular and highly regarded music show, "The Paul McLoone Show" which airs every Monday- Thursday 9 pm to midnight and which is best known for focusing on sole singers and bands in the alternative and indie rock world. McLoone and Couse have a strong friendship with Couse regularly filling in for McLoone in the event that McLoone is either covering the slot of another Today FM radio presenter, on holidays or off performing gigs with the Northern Irish pop-punk band, The Undertones of which McLoone is the current frontman/vocalist, a position McLoone has held since the band officially reformed in November 1999.

== Discography ==
- For Couse's work with A House, see the A House discography.

=== Albums ===
- Genes (Beep-Beep, RoI, 2003)
  - Tracks: Satisfaction / At The End Of The Day / Will It Ever Stop Raining / Familiar Feeling / I Almost Touched You / For Sale / If This Is Where Love Is / Self Obsessed / You Don't Know What Love Is / Everybody's Got Their Own Troubles / Intoxicating / Close Watch (John Cale) / Peaceful...
- The World Should Know (1969 Records, RoI, 2005, and UK, 2006) – as Couse and The Impossible
- Alonewalk (1969 Records, RoI, 2010)
  - Tracks: Black and White / Dark Blue / Don't Say a Word / Good Friday / Habitual / What Will Become of Us / All Tomorrows / Time

=== Singles and EPs ===
- "Next Time Round" (Shifty Disco, UK, 2000) – with Fergal Bunbury, as Lokomotiv (tracks: "Next Time Round" / "Intercourse with the World")
  "Next Time Round" features Briana Corrigan on backing vocals, and Úna O Boyle takes lead vocals on "Intercourse with the World"
  "Next Time Round" is included on the Shifty Disco Singles Club compilation 0–60 in Five Years – The Complete Shifty Disco Singles Club Collection
- "Familiar Feeling" (promo single) (RoI, 2003) (tracks: "Familiar Feeling" / "Close Watch" (John Cale))
- "Satisfaction" (promo single) (RoI, 2003)
- "Batman and Robin" (1969 Records, RoI, 2005) – as Couse and the Impossible (tracks: "Batman and Robin" / "Sunday Morning" (Lou Reed) / "Youngblood")
- Beauty Is (EP) (RoI, 2006) – as Couse and the Impossible (tracks: "Beauty Is" / "Small Talk" (live) / "Twist and Squeeze" (live) / "I Am Afraid" (live))
- "A Celebration / Endless Art 06" (1969 Records, RoI 2006) – as Couse and the Impossible
- "Beautiful Music" / "Catalyst" / "Faith Avenue" / "Story" / "Visions of Karla" – for a time (circa 2009), five further tracks (as if an EP) by Lokomotiv were available for free download from www.davecouse.com (now defunct)

=== Compilation appearances ===
- Couse performed a version of the song "Blue Christmas" on the charity Christmas album It's All Bells – Jingle All the Way, released by Phutloose Records in 2002 featuring many contributors from the Irish indie scene.
- He was one of the "friends" on the 2006 charity Christmas single by Pugwash and Friends, "Tinsel and Marzipan" (in support of the Irish Epilepsy Association).
- The 2009 charity album Sparks'n'Mind (1969 Records) consists of Irish musicians performing covers with proceeds going to Aware, the Irish charity for sufferers of depression; Couse takes on "Caroline, No" by the Beach Boys. This track later appeared as a bonus track on streaming versions of the album Alonewalk.
