= Power of Dreams (band) =

Dublin-based rock band

- Origin: Dublin, Ireland
- Genres: Alternative rock, indie rock
- Years active: 1988–1995, 2009-present
- Labels: Polydor, Lemon Records
- Members: Craig Walker (guitar/vocals); Mick Lennox (bass); Ian Olney (guitar); Keith Walker (drums); Erik Alcock (guitar)
- Past members: Claire Sullivan (bass)
- Website: https://www.facebook.com/Power-Of-Dreams-259994374169/

Power of Dreams are a Dublin-based rock band, built around the vocals and songwriting of Craig Walker.

== History ==
Power of Dreams released their critically acclaimed first EP A Little Piece of God, on Keith Cullen's London-based Setanta Records in 1989, while Walker was still at school. Following a six-figure bidding war between rival record labels, the band signed a deal with Polydor Records. In December 1989, the British music magazine NME picked Power of Dreams, along with others such as Carter USM and the Charlatans, as their "stars of tomorrow".

Their first album, Immigrants, Emigrants and Me, was released in 1990, receiving glowing reviews worldwide. The album was produced by Ray Shulman and sold well in France, Japan, the UK and Ireland. The band then embarked on a world tour as a supporting act for the Mission, taking in more than 30 countries, including Japan and North America. The follow-up album, 2 Hell With Common Sense, was released two years later, produced by Dave Meegan and with a more powerful sound, aided by additional guitarist Ian Olney (ex-Cypress, Mine!).

Later albums were less successful in the UK and Ireland but the band retained a following, and their major label contract in Japan. The third album, Positivity, was released on Lemon Records in 1993, and further developed the sound introduced on their previous record. Power of Dreams released a last album, Become Yourself, the following year. In 1995, the band backed and recorded with the musician Soichi Taniguchi in Japan before disbanding.

Following the split, Craig Walker and Olney formed Pharmacy with Chris Pierce, and Morty McCarthy from the Sultans of Ping FC. Pharmacy released one single called "Shine" in 1998. Subsequently, Walker recorded three albums with Archive before releasing his first solo album, Siamese, in 2009. Olney formed and performed in a number of bands including Temperance Union, Miracle Retreat, Deer Park and Red Atlas, and has been playing bass guitar for Sultans of Ping since 2005. Keith Walker would go on to front Paranoid Saints, the Ex-Kings and the Bollox.

== Reunion ==
In November 2009, Power of Dreams announced a reformation and tour to promote the 20th-anniversary re-release of their first album (on 100% Music) in March 2010. In December 2010, a further tour of Ireland took place with Sultans of Ping and The Frank and Walters to support the release of a compilation album, 1989: The Best of Power of Dreams, which included a new track. Power of Dreams' most recent gig was as part of "Indie Daze" at London's Forum in September 2014.

In March 2011, Keith Walker announced an amicable departure from the band and has gone on to play with Sister Cities, Being Cool Is Lonely and The Holy Coast. Olney plays with a new band, Cat Meat. Walker continued to perform as Power of Dreams and to work on new material alongside his new project, Mineral, based in Paris. In 2014, The Avener had a chart-topping hit single in several European countries with "Fade Out Lines", a remix of a song written by Walker and Phoebe Killdeer (ex-Nouvelle Vague) for Phoebe Killdeer and the Short Straws' second album Innerquake, released in 2012.

In December 2011, Immigrants, Emigrants and Me appeared in the book 101 Irish Records You Must Hear Before You Die. In April 2013, the album was in the Irish Independent's top 30 albums of all time.

In 2020, Power of Dreams released two new singles, "America"/"Across the Shannon", and "Hurricane", to promote forthcoming album Ausländer.

In July 2021, Ausländer, their first album in 27 years was released by The state51 Conspiracy and became a new entry on the Official Irish Albums Chart Top 50 when it charted at Number 22 on the chart of 5 August 2021.

In 2022, Walker received a Canadian Screen Award nomination for Best Original Song at the 10th Canadian Screen Awards for "Drop the Rock", a song he cowrote with Nicolas Errèra for the 2021 film Goodbye Happiness (Au revoir le bonheur).

== Discography ==
=== Albums ===
- Immigrants, Emigrants and Me (1990)
- American Dream (1991)
- 2 Hell with Common Sense (1992)
- Positivity (1993)
- Become Yourself (1994)
- Immigrants, Emigrants and Me – 20th Anniversary Double CD Remaster (2010) (#10 Ireland Charts)
- 1989: The Best Of Power Of Dreams (2010)
- Ausländer (2021) (#22 Ireland Charts)

=== Singles ===
- "A Little Piece Of God" (1989)
- "100 Ways To Kill A Love" (1990) (#20 Ireland Charts, #94 UK)
- "The Joke's On Me" (1990) (Irish only release, withdrawn on day of release)
- "Never Been To Texas" (1990) (#87 UK)
- "Stay" (1990)
- "American Dream" (1991) (#22 Ireland Charts, #74 UK)
- "Slowdown" (1992) (#22 Ireland Charts)
- "There I Go Again" (1992) (#21 Ireland Charts, #65 UK)
- "Second Son EP" (1992)
- "Cathy's World" (1993)
- "1989" (2010)
- "America/Across The Shannon" (2020)
- "Hurricane" (2020)
- "Do it" (2021)
- "Somebody Somewhere" (2026)
