= Eleven Modern Antiquities =

Studio album by Pugwash
- Released: 21 March 2008
- Recorded: The Bunker, Dublin; The Glebe, Dublin
- Genre: Chamber pop, power pop
- Label: 1969 Records/Ape House
- Producer: Thomas Walsh; Keith Farrell

Pugwash chronology
Jollity (2005)	Eleven Modern Antiquities (2008)	Giddy (2009)

Professional ratings
Review scores
Source	Rating
Hot Press	4.5/5 stars
Irish Times	4/5 stars

Eleven Modern Antiquities is the fourth studio album by Irish pop band Pugwash. It was released in Ireland by 1969 Records on 21 March 2008 and was originally scheduled for worldwide release in an expanded edition on Ape House records in May 2010, but so far this latter edition has not seen release. Two singles were released from the album in Ireland: "Take Me Away" and "At The Sea".

== Track listing ==
No.	Title	Writer(s)	Length
1.	"Take Me Away"	Thomas Walsh	3:37
2.	"Cluster Bomb"	Walsh	2:28
3.	"Here"	Walsh	3:16
4.	"It's So Fine"	Walsh	3:27
5.	"Song For You"	Walsh	2:53
6.	"My Genius"	Walsh, Andy Partridge	4:08
7.	"Limerance"	Walsh	3:48
8.	"Your Friend"	Walsh	3:11
9.	"The Cannon and the Bell"	Walsh	1:50
10.	"At the Sea"	Walsh, Partridge	3:21
11.	"Landsdowne Valley"	Walsh	5:28

== Personnel ==
- Thomas Walsh: vocals, backing vocals, acoustic guitar, electric guitar, Novatron, Mellotron, Hammond organ, Korg synth, Chamberlin, saxophone, baritone bass guitar, vibes, drums, samples, handclaps
- Keith Farrell: bass guitar, upright bass, Moog, Mellotron, Hammond organ, electric guitar, acoustic guitar, piano, samples, backing vocals
- Johnny Boyle: drums, percussion, handclaps
- Jason Falkner: electric guitars, piano, percussion
- Nelson Bragg: sleighbells, wood block, shakers, conga, güiro, castanets, tambourine, bongo, cymbal, shovel, handclaps, backing vocals
- Neil Hannon: zither, glockenspiel, piano, organ, Kawai R-1A rhythmer, Rhodes piano, vocals, vocoder
- Dave Gregory: piano, electric guitar, string arrangements
- Aidan O'Grady: cymbal, handclaps
- Rike Soeller: cello
- Stephen Farrell: slide guitar, electric guitar
- Eric Matthews: flugelhorn, backing vocals
- Andy Partridge: kazoo, Mellotron brass, acoustic guitar, swanee whistle
- Michael Penn: electric guitar
- Daragh Bohan: Mellotron, vocals
- Paul Bohan: vocals
- Section Quartet: strings
