= Alonewalk =

- Alonewalk cover

Studio album by Dave Couse
- Released: April 2, 2010
- Label: 1969 Records
- Producers: Dave Couse and Phil Hayes

Dave Couse chronology
The World Should Know (2005)	Alonewalk (2010)

Professional ratings
Review scores
Source	Rating
Irish Times	4/5 stars
Irish Independent	3/5 stars

Alonewalk is the third album released by Dave Couse since the breakup of A House, his second on 1969 Records. It was mastered by Bob Ludwig and features a duet with Cathal Coughlan on the song "Good Friday". Coughlan's vocal was recorded in his own studio in London and Couse and Coughlan didn't meet during the recording of the song. The album was released online on Good Friday (April 2) in 2010 and on compact disc in October 2010.

Nick Kelly, writing for The Irish Independent described the album as "a total revelation ... the sound of an artist changing and maturing". Hot Press described it as "a lush, beautiful sounding album". Tony Clayton-Lea writing for The Irish Times characterised the album as "a songwriter getting to grips ... with nitty-gritty subjects in a reflective, almost sombre (but always compelling) manner".

A cover of The Beach Boys' "Caroline, No" which was originally released on the 2009 charity album Sparks'n'Mind (1969 Records) later appeared as a bonus track on streaming versions of Alonewalk.

== Track listing ==
All tracks are written by Dave Couse.

Alonewalk track listing
No.	Title	Length
1.	"Black and White"	5:39
2.	"Dark Blue"	4:37
3.	"Don't Say a Word"	6:42
4.	"Good Friday (feat. Cathal Coughlan"	4:35
5.	"Habitual"	4:10
6.	"What Will Become of Us?"	5:47
7.	"All Tomorrows"	4:26
8.	"Time"	9:45

== Personnel ==
Credits adapted from the album's liner notes.

- Dave Couse – vocals, piano and production
- Fergal Bunbury – guitar
- Rike Soeller – cello
- Cathal Coughlan – vocals (4)
- John Hanley – drums (7)
- Bob Ludwig – mastering
- Phil Hayes – production
