= Simon Quigley =

Irish pianist and composer

- Occupation: Composer
- Instrument: Piano

Simon Quigley is a pianist and composer from Dublin, Ireland. Since his time as a founding member of indie group Sack, he has had a varied career in recording and performing with numerous well-known Irish artists, including Camille O'Sullivan, Briana Corrigan and Dave Couse.

Quigley has composed for documentaries and television series for RTÉ. One project, Ireland Is ..., with lyricist Mark Cullen and poet Colm Keegan as The Unruly Trinity was set for release in November 2010. With musical influences ranging from Kraftwerk to Arvo Pärt, he also worked on his first solo album, a "contemporary classical journey through times and places." Part of this album is a composition with soprano Clare Kavanagh of the English National Opera, and Martin McCann, based on the 3rd Inquiry into the Titanic sinking. It's entitled Ryan v the White Star Line, and concerned Thomas Ryan from Askeaton and his pursuit of justice for his son Patrick who perished on the ship with 1500 other souls.
