= 2 Hell with Common Sense =

2 Hell With Common Sense

Studio album by Power of Dreams
- Released: 1992
- Genre: Alternative rock
- Length: 52:19 min
- Label: Polydor, Polydor K.K.
- Producer: Dave Meegan

Power of Dreams chronology
Immigrants, Emigrants and Me (1990)	2 Hell With Common Sense (1992)	Positivity (1993)

Professional ratings
Review scores
Source	Rating
AllMusic	3/5 stars
Select	4/5 stars

2 Hell With Common Sense is a 1992 album by Power of Dreams. It was released as the follow-up to their debut, Immigrants, Emigrants and Me, and included the singles "There I Go Again" and "Slowdown".

== Track listing ==
1. Raindown
2. There I Go Again
3. On and On
4. She's Gone
5. Untitled
6. You Bring Me Flowers
7. Understand
8. Slowdown
9. 100 Seconds
10. Happy Game
11. Metalscape
12. Blue Note
13. Fall
14. Cancer
