= Here Come the Good Times =

1994 single by A House

Single by A House

from the album Wide-Eyed and Ignorant
- Released: 1994
- Label: MCA; Radioactive; Setanta; Parlophone

"Here Come the Good Times" is a song by Irish indie rock band A House, released as a single from their 1994 album Wide-Eyed and Ignorant. It is the only single by A House to chart in the UK top 40, reaching number 37.

The song was included on A House's 2002 greatest hits album, The Way We Were.

== Track listings ==
"Here Come the Good Times" was released in two parts. Part 1 came in a 2-CD fold-out digipak, with space to contain Part 2.

CD1 Here Come the Good Times (Part 1)

1. "Here Come the Good Times"
2. "Children of the Revolution" (T.Rex)
3. "I Feel Love" (Donna Summer)
4. "Love Song" (The Damned)

CD2 Here Come the Good Times (Part 2)

1. "Here Come the Good Times"
2. "Everybody Needs Something"
3. "Soon"
4. "All We Need"

== Charts ==
Chart (1994)	Peak position
Europe (Eurochart Hot 100)	91
Ireland (IRMA)	21
Scotland Singles (OCC)	47
UK Singles (OCC)	37

== 2002 version ==
"Here Come the Good Times"

Single by The Irish World Cup Squad (feat. Christy Dignam, Nicky Byrne, Dustin, Eamonn Dunphy, George Hamilton)
- B-side: "Here Come the Good Times" (karaoke version)
- Released: May 2002
- Recorded: 2002
- Genre: Novelty
- Length: 4:11
- Label: Warner Music UK
- Songwriter: A House
- Producer: Ronan Johnston

Republic of Ireland national football team singles chronology
"Put 'Em Under Pressure" (1990)	"Here Come the Good Times" (2002)	"The Rocky Road to Poland" (2012)

"Here Come the Good Times" was re-recorded by members of the Irish soccer squad, and various Irish celebrities and boy band members for use as the official Irish 2002 World Cup anthem. Proceeds went to charity, and €40,000 was raised for Our Lady's Children's Hospital, Crumlin in Dublin. This version of the song topped the Irish Singles Chart.

=== Track listing ===
1. "Here Come the Good Times" (radio version)
2. "Here Come the Good Times" (karaoke version)

=== Charts ===
==== Weekly charts ====
Chart (2002)	Peak position
Ireland (IRMA)	1

==== Year-end charts ====
Chart (2002)	Position
Ireland (IRMA)	28
