= Jollity =

Studio album by Pugwash
- Released: 23 September 2005
- Recorded: The Glebe, Dublin; The Bunker, Dublin; Abbey Road Studio 2, London
- Genre: Chamber pop, power pop
- Label: 1969 Records, Karmic Hit
- Producer: Thomas Walsh, Keith Farrell

Pugwash chronology
Earworm (2003)	Jollity (2005)	Eleven Modern Antiquities (2008)

Professional ratings
Review scores
Source	Rating
PopMatters	8/10 stars
Irish Times	4/5 stars
Hot Press	4/5 stars
Entertainment.ie	4/5 stars
mX	(Positive)

Jollity is the third studio album by Irish pop band Pugwash. It was released in Ireland by 1969 Records on 23 September 2005 and in Australia by Karmic Hit on 10 October 2005. It was released in the UK on 31 October 2006. Two singles were released from the album: "It's Nice to Be Nice" and "This Could Be Good".

== Track listing ==
No.	Title	Writer(s)	Length
1.	"It's Nice to Be Nice"	Thomas Walsh	3:26
2.	"Black Dog"	Walsh	3:11
3.	"A Rose in a Garden of Weeds"	Walsh	3:21
4.	"I Want You Back in My Life (for Mam)"	Walsh	4:40
5.	"This Could Be Good"	Walsh	3:11
6.	"Poles Together"	Walsh	4:28
7.	"Even I"	Walsh	5:09
8.	"Something New"	Walsh	3:56
9.	"Waltz No. 714"	Walsh	4:34
10.	"Lullaby No. 1"	Walsh	2:16
11.	"Anchor"	Walsh, Andy Partridge, Duncan Maitland	5:42

== Personnel ==
- Thomas Walsh: vocals, backing vocals, acoustic guitar, rhythm guitar, electric guitar, lead guitar, piano, pianet, organ, tremolo guitar, Yamaha SY-2 synth, glockenspiel, Novatron, Mellotron, saxophone, vibes, samples, tambourine, shakers, sleighbells
- Keith Farrell: bass guitar, lead guitar, rhythm guitar, acoustic guitar, Wurlitzer, samples, backing vocals
- Duncan Maitland: Piano, Mellotron, synths, drumbox, Wurlitzer, acoustic guitar, Vox organ, Moog, grand piano, tack piano, samples, vibes, harpsichord, 12-string acoustic guitar, backing vocals
- Aidan O'Grady: drums
- Dave Gregory: grand piano, acoustic guitar, lead guitar, EBow guitar, Mellotron, sitar, tremolo guitar, slide guitar, 12-string Rickenbacker, pipe organ
- Ger Eaton: Hammond organ
- Shaun McGee: bass, backing vocals
- Tosh Flood: banjo, harpsichord, organ, vibes, rhythm guitar, lead guitar, backing vocals
- Graham Hopkins: drums, guitar noise sample
- John Boyle: drums
- Eric Matthews: trumpet, flugelhorn, backing vocals
- Daragh Bohan: guitar sample, fuzz chorus guitar
- Richard Dodd: cello
- Q: EBow guitar
- Stephen Farrell: slide guitar
- Fran King: backing vocals
- Derren Dempsey: drum, guitar noise sample
- Section Quartet: strings
