= Kiss Kiss (Bang Bang) =

2001 film by Stewart Sugg

- Directed by: Stewart Sugg
- Written by: Stewart Sugg
- Produced by: James Richardson
- Starring: Stellan Skarsgård; Chris Penn; Paul Bettany; Martine McCutcheon
- Cinematography: Tony Pierce-Roberts
- Edited by: Jim Clark
- Music by: John Dankworth
- Distributed by: D'Vision; Europa Filmes; GAGA Communications; Millennium Storm
- Release dates: 7 November 2001 (France); 21 March 2002 (Hungary); 21 December 2002 (Japan)
- Running time: 97 min.
- Country: United Kingdom
- Language: English
- Budget: £3,000,000

Kiss Kiss (Bang Bang) is a 2001 British comedy film written and directed by Stewart Sugg. It features Stellan Skarsgård, Chris Penn, and Paul Bettany.

== Plot ==
Felix is a hitman who wants out of the business. He takes up a job to look after a reclusive man named Bubba who is like a giant kid: he does not understand people and does not know much, never having seen the outside world before. But Felix has bigger problems. He wants to patch up with his ex-girlfriend, and he's being targeted by his old colleagues who are not letting him get away from his past so easily.

== Cast ==
- Stellan Skarsgård as Felix
- Chris Penn as Bubba
- Paul Bettany as Jimmy
- Allan Corduner as Big Bob
- Jacqueline McKenzie as Sherry
- Martine McCutcheon as Mia
- Sienna Guillory as Kat
- Stephen Walters as Kick Box Stevie
- Ashley Artus as Mick Foot
- Belinda Stewart-Wilson as Camilla
- Benedict Wong as Pat Proudence
