= On Our Big Fat Merry-Go-Round =

Studio album by A House
- Released: 1988
- Recorded: 1988
- Genre: Pop rock
- Length: 38:42
- Label: Blanco y Negro / Sire
- Producer: Steve Lovell, Steve Power

A House chronology
On Our Big Fat Merry-Go-Round (1988)	I Want Too Much (1990)

Professional ratings
Review scores
Source	Rating
AllMusic	4.5/5 stars

On Our Big Fat Merry-Go-Round is the 1988 debut album by Irish rock band A House. According to AllMusic, the album reveals a taste for driving, catchy guitar rock somewhat in the style of U2. Among the album's tracks are attacks on journalists ("That's Not the Truth") and the production team of Stock Aitken Waterman ("Stone the Crows"). "Violent Love" deals with the topic of domestic violence.

"Call Me Blue" was released as a single and reached No. 9 on the Billboard Modern Rock Tracks chart in December 1988.

== Track listing ==
1. "Call Me Blue" – 2:11
2. "I Want to Kill Something" – 2:24
3. "I'll Always Be Grateful" – 2:42
4. "My Little Lighthouse" – 4:02
5. "Watch Out You're Dead" – 3:00
6. "Don't Ever Think You're Different" – 2:10
7. "That's Not the Truth" – 2:33
8. "Love of the Eighties" – 2:51
9. "Violent Love" – 2:06
10. "Love Quarry" – 2:32
11. "Clump of Trees" – 3:27
12. "Stone the Crows" – 3:13
13. "Hay When the Sun Shines" – 2:50
14. "Freak Out" [*] – 2:40
  - Extra track on CD versions of the album; originally a B-side on the Call Me Blue single.
