= Amelia Stein =

Irish photographer (born 1958)

Amelia Stein RHA
- Born: 1958 (age 67–68); Dublin, Ireland
- Known for: Photography
- Notable work: The Palm House; The Bloods
- Parent(s): Mendel Stein; Mona Stein
- Elected: Royal Hibernian Academy, Aosdána
- Website: ameliastein.com

Amelia Stein RHA (born 1958) is an Irish photographer.

== Early life ==
Stein was born in Dublin in 1958 to a Jewish family; her father was Mendel Stein, an optician based on Harcourt Street.

== Career ==
Stein has worked freelance since 1981, mostly in commissioned images and production photography for Irish theatre and opera. She has also worked on book covers and record sleeves with U2, Altan, A House and The Pogues. She uses a Hasselblad camera and carries out hand-colouring of photographs.

Stein was the first photographer elected to the Royal Hibernian Academy in 2004. She was elected to Aosdána in 2006. According to that organisation, she is "a singularly exacting photographer whose work is characterised by meticulous attention to detail in tandem with the attributes of fine black and white photographic printing, many of the images having a theatrical presence."

Her work ranges from (per IMMA) "portraiture, images of the performing arts and Dublin's Botanical Gardens, to deeply personal examinations of loss and memory, absence and presence."
