= The Olympus Sound =

Studio album by Pugwash
- Released: 19 August 2011
- Recorded: January–March 2011; Exchequer Studios, Dublin; Summit Studios, Dublin; Tonsil Town Studios, Swindon
- Genre: Chamber pop, power pop
- Length: 42:06
- Label: 1969 Records/EMI; Lojinx
- Producer: Thomas Walsh, Tosh Flood

Pugwash chronology
Giddy (2009)	The Olympus Sound (2011)

Singles from The Olympus Sound
- 1. "Answers on a Postcard" Released: 24 June 2011; 2. "Fall Down" Released: 20 November 2011

Professional ratings
Review scores
Source	Rating
Daily Express	5/5 stars
Hot Press	Favourable
The Independent	3/5 stars
Irish Times	4/5 stars
Metro Herald	4/5 stars
Sunday World	4/5 stars
Uncut	7/10 stars

The Olympus Sound is the fifth studio album by Irish power pop band Pugwash. It features contributions from Ben Folds, Neil Hannon of the Divine Comedy, and Dave Gregory and Andy Partridge of XTC. Frontman Thomas Walsh wrote the track "Dear Belinda" as a birthday present for British actress Belinda Stewart-Wilson, and claimed Stewart-Wilson had requested to sing vocals on the final version of the song but she does not appear on the album.

== Release and reception ==
The album was released in Ireland by 1969 Records and EMI on 19 August 2011. The iTunes version featured two bonus tracks not included on the CD. On its release, The Irish Times hailed it as "the best Irish album of the year to date" while Hot Press said it was "the best thing [Pugwash] has ever done". The Irish Daily Star named it among its top 10 Irish albums of 2011. It was nominated for the Choice Music Prize 2011, an award given to the best Irish album of the year, in January 2012.

After signing a three-year deal with British indie label Lojinx, The Olympus Sound was released outside Ireland on CD and vinyl on 16 April 2012. The CD version includes three bonus tracks not included on the original physical or iTunes releases.

== Album title ==
The title of the album refers to the fact that Walsh recorded the initial demos for The Olympus Sound on an Olympus voice recorder and, instead of reworking them into more a polished form, was convinced by bandmate Tosh Flood to send them to him as they were. Flood then used the demos to record some instrumental parts, which ended up being used on the final version of the album.

I wanted to do what I normally do with a Pugwash record, which is wait until the second acoustic demo stage before playing the songs to people, but Tosh wanted to hear the Olympus dictaphone demos. I sent them over reluctantly, and within about three hours he'd sent back about eight tracks of guitars, keyboards and Mellotron on "There You Are", and those ended up being the ones we used on the final the song. It was the perfect sound so we kept it and started the album from there.

— Thomas Walsh

== Artwork ==
The cover artwork is taken from a 2010 painting called The Unseen, by British artists and married couple Emma Biggs and Matthew Collings.

== Track listing ==
No.	Title	Writer(s)	Length
1.	"Answers on a Postcard"	Thomas Walsh	2:54
2.	"There You Are"	Walsh	3:27
3.	"To The Warmth of You"	Walsh	3:12
4.	"Fall Down"	Walsh	4:08
5.	"Be My Friend Awhile"	Walsh	4:12
6.	"Dear Belinda"	Walsh	2:35
7.	"15 Kilocycle Tone"	Walsh	2:49
8.	"I Don't Like It but I've Gotta Do It"	Walsh	2:45
9.	"Here We Go 'Round Again"	Walsh, Andy Partridge	3:14
10.	"Such Beauty Thrown Away"	Walsh	3:20
11.	"See You Mine (Coda)"	Walsh	5:04
12.	"Four Days"	Walsh	4:30

iTunes bonus tracks
No.	Title	Writer(s)	Length
13.	"You Can Build a House on Love"	Walsh	2:43
14.	"August Born"	Walsh	2:37

Lojinx CD release bonus tracks
No.	Title	Writer(s)	Length
13.	"Heal Me"	Walsh	3:49
14.	"Happy Again"	Walsh	3:37
15.	"Waltz with Me"	Walsh	5:07

== Personnel ==
- Thomas Walsh: vocals, backing vocals, acoustic guitar, electric guitar, piano, Mellotron, Chamberlin, tubular bells, Solina Strings, drums, percussion, samples
- Tosh Flood: electric guitar, backing vocals, baritone bass guitar, Hammond organ, Mellotron, mandolin, piano, autoharp, acoustic guitar, Wurlitzer, spinet, harpsichord, Moog, vibraphone, pedal steel, 12 string acoustic guitar
- Shaun McGee: bass guitar, backing vocals
- Joe Fitzgerald: drums, percussion
- Neil Hannon: piano, Korg synth, Mellotron, harpsichord, backing vocals
- Dave Gregory: Rhodes piano, string arrangement
- Ben Folds: piano
- Andy Partridge: backing vocals
- Dolores Flood: wish bell
- Michelle Mason: cello
- Fergal O'Dhornain: viola
- Katie O'Connor: violin
- Alvin Quatro: e-bow
- Fergal Davis: backing vocals
