= Endless Art =

Single by A House

from the album I Am the Greatest
- Released: 1992
- Genre: Indie rock
- Label: Setanta Records
- Songwriter: A House
- Producers: Edwyn Collins, Dale Griffin

"Endless Art" is a song by Irish indie rock band A House, released initially as the lead track on the Bingo EP (1991) and then as a single from their 1991 album I Am the Greatest. It was later included on the greatest hits album The Way We Were.

After the commercial failure of their 1990 album I Want Too Much, A House had been dropped from their label Blanco y Negro Records and were signed by the indie label Setanta Records. They released the EPs Doodle and Bingo at the end of 1990 and in 1991. Bingo included the first appearance of "Endless Art", which A House recorded with Edwyn Collins as producer. Although the song did not enjoy great chart success, it reached number 46 in the UK and it gained some airplay on MTV Europe.

The lyrics to "Endless Art" begin with the line "All art is quite useless according to Oscar Wilde" and continue with a long list of the names and birth and death dates of artists from various fields, with the chorus line: "All dead but still alive, in endless time and endless art". This "list" style of song is characteristic of many of Dave Couse's songs. The majority of the lyrics are declaimed rather than sung, over a repetitive electric guitar motif. The song's chorus is evocative of Beethoven's Symphony No. 5.

== Video ==
"Endless Art" was accompanied by a stop-motion video that received praise. When Paul King played the video on his final MTV's Greatest Hits show, as one "of those videos that I really do think deserve to be called great and classic", alongside others such as "Thriller" and "Ashes to Ashes".

== Criticism ==
For the first appearance of the song on Bingo, the band received some criticism for the fact that the artists listed in the song are all male. The band responded with a second version, "More Endless Art", in which all of the named artists are female, with the Beethoven-inspired chorus melody substituted with one by Carl Orff.

== Updated version ==
Dave Couse has performed a live version of "Endless Art" with a new list of artists who have died since the original release of the song. This version is available as "Endless Art 06" on the B-side of Couse's 2006 single "A Celebration".

== Track listings ==
Bingo

EP by A House
- Released: 1991
- Genre: Indie rock
- Label: Setanta Records
- Producer: Edwyn Collins

"Endless Art" single (1992)

1. "Endless Art"
2. "Freak Show"*
3. "More Endless Art"
4. "Charity"*

∗ From a live recording for a John Peel session on February 2, 1992.

- All songs written by A House.
- Produced by Edwyn Collins (1, 3) and Dale Griffin (2, 4).

Bingo EP (1991)

1. "Endless Art"
2. "Our Love Is Good Enough"
3. "Slipping Away"
4. "Baby You're Too Much"
- All songs written by A House.
