= The Ex-Kings =

American indie rock band

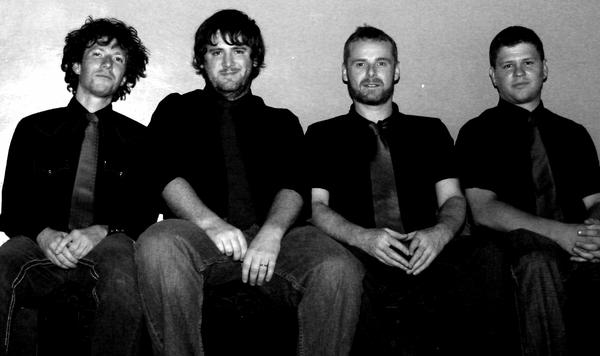
- The Ex-Kings perform at the Last Exit in Tempe, AZ on Sept 27, 2007. Right to left: Michael Bassett, Eric VanAusdal, Keith Walker, Gary Lairson

Background information
- Origin: Phoenix, Arizona, United States
- Genres: Indie rock Alternative rock
- Years active: 2007 to 2008
- Members: Keith Walker; Michael Bassett; Eric VanAusdal; Gary Lairson
- Website: www.myspace.com/theexkings

The Ex-Kings were a Phoenix, Arizona-based indie rock band formed in early 2007. The band was composed of former Power of Dreams drummer and Paranoid Saints frontman Keith Walker, Gary Lairson (bass), Michael Bassett (guitar) and Eric VanAusdal (vocals and guitar). The Ex-Kings were heavily influenced by bands like The Beatles, The Pixies, and The Velvet Underground.

== History ==
Coworkers and friends Keith Walker and Michael Bassett formed the Ex-Kings of February 2007. In March 2007, the Ex-Kings recorded a four track EP with a line-up that consisted only of Keith Walker on drums, Michael Bassett on guitars, and Eric VanAusdal on bass. Keith Walker took on the role of vocalist for these tracks, which consisted of "Unwavering", "It's OK", "Ironic Translator", and "Here Comes Everything". Although not officially a member of the band when the EP was recorded, Eric VanAusdal was officially added to the group as bassist and vocalist a few weeks after the EP was recorded. A month later, Gary Lairson was added as bassist, moving Eric VanAusdal to rhythm guitar and vocals and solidifying the band's lineup for the next year.

The Ex-Kings released a 4 track E.P. in late Fall 2007. Tracks on the self-titled E.P. are "I Don't Know", "Waiting on American Girls", "Sweet Disaster", and "Shine". The band originally planned on a full release for the Spring of 2008, but have since disbanded.

== Break up and solo projects ==
On February 22, 2008, the Ex-Kings announced they would be breaking up. The breakup of the band is amiable and each member plans on taking active roles in each other's solo material. Keith Walker will be working on his own Paranoid Saints project as well as "The Bollox" with Authority Zero's Jason DeVore. Michael Bassett plans on working on his folk-rock project, The Dirty Boots. Eric VanAusdal will continue with his self-titled solo project. Gary Lairson plans on dedicating his time to completing sound engineering school at the Conservatory of Recording Arts and Sciences.

== Discography ==
=== EPs ===
- The Ex-Kings (2007) - Unreleased
- I Don't Know (2007) - Self-released
