= Immigrants, Emigrants and Me =

Studio album by Power of Dreams
- Released: 1990
- Studio: Master Rock
- Genre: Pop, rock
- Label: Polydor
- Producer: Ray Shulman

Power of Dreams chronology
Immigrants, Emigrants and Me (1990)	2 Hell with Common Sense (1992)

Professional ratings
Review scores
Source	Rating
Select	4/5

Immigrants, Emigrants and Me is the debut album by Irish pop/rock band Power of Dreams. It was released in 1990 and includes the singles "100 Ways to Kill a Love" and "Stay". The album was recorded over 40 days and produced by Ray Shulman.

== Track listing ==
- All songs written by Craig Walker. Published by CBS Music Publishing, Ltd.
1. "The Joke's on Me" – 02.57
2. "Talk" – 02:58
3. "Does It Matter" – 03:28
4. "Much Too Much" – 02:36
5. "Had You Listened" – 03:08
6. "Stay" – 03:12
7. "Never Told You" – 02:54
8. "Bring You Down" – 02:49
9. "Never Been to Texas" – 02:21
10. "Where Is the Love?" – 03:13
11. "Maire, I Don't Love You" – 03:27
12. "100 Ways to Kill a Love" – 03:52
13. "Mother's Eyes" – 02:37
14. "Average Day" – 02:58

== Personnel ==
=== Power of Dreams ===
- Craig Walker: Vocals, acoustic and electric guitars
- Michael Lennox: Bass
- Keith Walker: Drums

=== Additional Personnel ===
- Robbie Callan: Additional acoustic and electric guitars
