= Riverside (music venue) =

Riverside, Newcastle upon Tyne
- Interactive map of Riverside, Newcastle upon Tyne
- Location: 57-59 Melbourne Street, Newcastle-upon-Tyne, England
- Coordinates: 54.9717°N 1.6051°W
- Owner: 1985-1994: Co-operative - Riverside Entertainments Ltd; 1994-1999: Riverside Operations Ltd

Construction
- Opened: 1985–1999

Riverside was a music venue in Newcastle upon Tyne, England which operated from 1985 to 1999. It is the subject of a book, Riverside: Newcastle's Legendary Alternative Music Venue, by Hazel Plater and Carl Taylor, published by Tonto Books on 6 October 2011.

The Riverside name was resurrected in 2010 for a new music venue and nightlife spot in the city, although it is not a direct continuation of the original venue.

== Co-operative ==
The venue was set up as a left wing co-operative, Riverside Entertainments Ltd, using funding from Margaret Thatcher's government. Each member had a share and a vote on how the venue was run.

== Significant appearances ==
Artists who played included Julian Cope, The Waterboys, Red Hot Chili Peppers, Kirsty MacColl, Elvis Costello, Billy Bragg, The Go-Betweens, The Primitives, Michelle Shocked, The Proclaimers, Harrington, Pop Will Eat Itself, Doctor and the Medics, The Pixies, The Wedding Present, The Fall, Bad Religion, Belly, The Cranberries, James, The Stone Roses, Happy Mondays, The Charlatans (UK band), Sonic Youth, Nirvana (Riverside was their first live show outside North America), Pearl Jam, Oasis (famously cut short due to a fracas whilst broadcast live on BBC Radio One), Super Furry Animals, Catatonia, Faithless and David Bowie (at 890 capacity, it was the smallest venue on his 1997 tour).

== TV show ==
In 1991 Riverside was the subject of a Tyne Tees Television fly-on-the-wall documentary.

== Club nights ==
The venue hosted several club nights; Bliss, Woosh, The Bing Bong Rooms, Scarlet Weasel, The Palace, Viva and a house night, Shindig. In an interview with The Crack magazine, Shindig promoters Scott Bradford and Lee Melrose said that the best days of Shindig were those the club night spent at Riverside, between 1994 and 1999.

It also hosted a one-off night for what became a regular goth night called "Snakebite & Black" which later moved to Rockshots.

== Changes and sale ==
Riverside ceased to be a co-operative and became a limited company, Riverside Operations Ltd, in 1994. The venue continued to trade until the building was sold in 1999. Foundation nightclub then ran on the same site, from 2000-2005. The building is now office space with a private gym where the venue once was. Since 2010, a venue called "Riverside" has operated on the site of the former Sea night club, but is not connected to the original Riverside venue.

== Book ==
In 2010, Hazel Plater (who worked at the venue) and Carl Taylor (a regular attendee) began work on a book about the venue, Riverside: Newcastle's Legendary Alternative Music Venue. A preview of the book appeared in the September 2011 edition of The Crack magazine.
