= Into Paradise (band) =

Irish indie band, active 1986-1992

- Origin: Dublin, Ireland
- Genres: Indie rock, alternative rock
- Years active: 1988–1993
- Labels: Setanta, Ensign
- Members: David Long; Rachael Tighe; James Eadie; Ronan Clarke

Into Paradise were an Irish indie rock group from Dublin, Ireland, whose influences included Joy Division and Echo & the Bunnymen. They formed in 1986 as Backwards into Paradise, and released their debut EP, Blue Light, in 1989 on the independent record label, Setanta. Soon after came the EP Change, and the band's first album, Under the Water.

Their most successful album and major record label debut, was the Adrian Borland-produced Churchtown.

== Members ==
- David Long (vocals, guitar)
- Rachael Tighe (bass)
- James Eadie (guitar, keyboards, vocals)
- Ronan Clarke (drums)

== Discography ==
=== Albums ===
- Under the Water (1990)
- Churchtown (1991)

Compilations

- Into Paradise (1990 US only compilation)

=== Singles and EPs ===
- Blue Light (EP) (1989)
- Change (EP) (1990)
- "Burns My Skin" (1991)
- "Angel" (1991)
- "Down All the Days" (1992)
- "Angelus" (1992)
- "For No One" (1993)
