= Genes (album) =

Studio album by Dave Couse
- Released: August 18, 2003
- Label: Beep Beep
- Producers: Dave Couse and Edwyn Collins

Dave Couse chronology
| Genes (2003) | The World Should Know (2005) |

Genes, from 2003, is the first album released by Dave Couse since the breakup of A House in 1997.

== Genes ==
Couse released Genes on his own record label, Beep Beep. It is very much a solo affair, with all songs but one written by Couse, and mostly performed by Couse, although he enlisted old friend Edwyn Collins as producer. Many of the songs are also very personal, with Couse himself referring to it as "somewhat introspective affair".

An important theme is that of family, as represented by the title and also the artwork (which seems to include old family photos), and specifically of Couse's relationship to his father who had only recently died when the record was being made. The song that Couse didn't write is John Cale's "(I Keep a) Close Watch" (listed as "Close Watch" on Genes), which addresses the fear of loss associated with love. This song is for many the highlight of the record, perhaps because the indirection of a cover performance helped Couse in the face of his grief over his father coupled with the apprehension of becoming a father himself. John Cale and The Velvet Underground are also significant musical influences on Couse. (Note: Couse cites Cale, The Velvet Underground, and Lou Reed as influences on his myspace page. A cover of the Velvet Underground song "Sunday Morning" shows up on one of his later singles ("Batman and Robin", 2005).)

Released on a small, self-managed label, Genes did not sell very well. However, as the first move in a solo career, whose next step, the album The World Should Know, would be nominated for a couple of Meteor Awards, Genes was significant to Couse and to fans of A House who had been waiting to hear from him since 1997. (Note: Couse and Fergal Bunbury from A House had worked on a project named Lokomotiv which generated one single release in 2000.)

== Track listing ==
1. Satisfaction
2. At The End Of The Day
3. Will It Ever Stop Raining
4. Familiar Feeling
5. I Almost Touched You
6. For Sale
7. If This Is Where Love Is
8. Self Obsessed
9. You Don't Know What Love Is
10. Everybody's Got Their Own Troubles
11. Intoxicating
12. Close Watch
13. Peaceful...

(All songs written by Couse except "Close Watch", written by John Cale.)
