= Keith Cullen (author) =

Irish music industry executive and author

Keith Cullen (born 1968 in Dún Laoghaire, south of Dublin in Ireland), is the founder of Setanta Records, an artist manager and the author of the novel God Save The Village Green.

== History ==
Cullen moved to London in 1985, squatting in the Camberwell area, and worked as a bicycle courier before establishing Setanta in 1990: "From my mid teens, running a record label had been my only ambition," he recalls. Albums by The Divine Comedy, Richard Hawley, Edwyn Collins and The Frank and Walters were issued on his label before its decline and Cullen's gradual disenchantment with the music scene in the early 2000s. The last issue by the label came in 2012 when it released a compilation of covers called Orchestral Variations V.01 by The Separate featuring, among others, Ed Harcourt, Mark Lanegan, Martha Wainwright, Patrick Wolf and Joan As Police Woman covering songs by artists including OMD, The Smiths, Phil Lynott and Talking Heads.

At the suggestion of an artist's manager, Cullen enrolled in a creative writing evening course. He self-published his first novel God Save The Village Green in May 2009 under the Setanta banner. In keeping with the Anglo-Irish nature of much of the label's output, the novel narrates the fictional story of a London Irish family in 1960s-'80s Barking, falling apart under various forms of abuse. Cullen described it as "a very grim and gritty book, not mainstream at all," in an interview with The Irish Times.

In 2012 Cullen announced that he was closing Setanta.

At present he is working on another novel and a stage play inspired by the music of The Pogues. He is also Artist Representative for My Bloody Valentine. In 2017 he revived the Setanta name as an online bookseller specialising in photography books and rare fiction based in London.

== Books ==
- God Save The Village Green. Setanta Songs Limited. May 2009. ISBN 978-0-9562205-0-9. (Hardcover, Softcover, download)
