= The Glee Club (band) =

Irish rock band

Background information
- Origin: Galway, Ireland
- Genre: Alternative rock
- Years active: 1993–1994, 2014–present
- Labels: Setanta, 4AD
- Members: Joanne Loughman; Hugh O'Carroll

The Glee Club are an Irish rock band.

== History ==
The Glee Club formed in Galway when vocalist Joanne Loughman and guitarist and violinist Hugh O'Carroll left their former band, the Swinging Swine. Relocating to London, and influenced by bands such as My Bloody Valentine and the Cocteau Twins, Loughman and O'Carroll, with occasional help from guitarist Kevin Boyle, recorded a demo, which would later be released as a seven-track mini-LP by Setanta Records.

For live performances, the band expanded to include bassist Magnus Box and drummer Adrian Meehan, who also played on the group's debut album, Mine, released in 1994 by 4AD. The album was described as "a delicate amalgam of female voices with an Eastern sensibility, and wisps of tunes which coalesce to form songs".

The Glee Club split up after touring the United States, with O'Carroll opting to stay in San Francisco.

They reformed in 2014, releasing the single "Platitudes" in 2015, and began performing live again. In 2017, they released a new album, Hive.

== Discography ==
=== Albums ===
- The Glee Club (1993)
- Mine (1994)
- Hive (2017)

=== Singles ===
- "Free to Believe" split with The Divine Comedy (1993)
- "Bad Child's Dolly" split with Insides (1993)
- "Platitudes" (2015)
