= The 4 of Us =

Rock band from Newry, Northern Ireland

- Origin: Newry, Northern Ireland
- Genres: Rock
- Years active: 1988–present
- Members: Brendan Murphy; Declan Murphy

The 4 of Us are a rock band from Newry, County Down, Northern Ireland. Of the four founding members, only brothers Brendan and Declan Murphy have remained continuously part of the group; the occupants of the other positions have varied.

== History ==
The 4 of Us released their first album, Songs for the Tempted on CBS Records in 1989, with the single "Mary", becoming one of the most played songs on Irish radio that year. Consequently, the album went double platinum in the Republic of Ireland and won Best Album of the Year at the Irish Music Awards, defeating the internationally known act U2.

The album Man Alive followed on Sony/Columbia Records in 1992, and saw the group enter the UK charts for the first time, with the album entering the chart at No. 64, and the single, "She Hits Me" spending four weeks on the chart peaking at No. 35.

The band then lost momentum, scrapping the release of Amplifier, their proposed third album but released two singles, "Change (Amplifier Version)" and "Someone's Got to Lose" in 1997.

They did not separate however, and eventually returned to recording albums, releasing the largely acoustic-based Classified Personal on the FUTURE INC. label in 1999.

== 2000s ==
Off the Record, an album of re-recordings of the band's best known songs appeared on EMI in 2000 and included the previously unreleased songs "The Girl Next Door" and "She's So Real".

In 2003, the single "Sunlight", which would appear on the 2004 album Heaven and Earth, began to receive airplay and was voted fourth in a poll to find the 'best Irish single ever', conducted by the national radio station Today FM.

In November 2006, the band released the album Fingerprints and followed this with a live album, Live at Vicar Street in 2009.

Throughout 2010/2011 via their Facebook page, the band previewed exclusive content, including previously unreleased tracks "The Way the River Flows" and "I Guess I Wasn't Made for These Times" which was made available as a free download single for a limited period.

On 21 October 2011, Brendan confirmed via The Gerry Anderson Show on BBC Radio Ulster, that a brand new studio album is in progress and scheduled for release in 2012. He also mentioned the possibility of a 'Best Of...' compilation in the very near future.

Declan announced on 5 December 2011 via Facebook that the previously unavailable third album Amplifier would be released as a free download on the band's official website.

On 14 August 2013, the first track "Seventy-Three" from the new album Sugar Island was premiered on the band's The4OfUsMurphyMusic YouTube channel. This was followed up on 10 September with "Hell to Pay".

On 25 March 2015, "Birds Eye View" was premiered before getting its mastered radio release on 8 April.

== Solo work ==
In 2010, Brendan Murphy released his first solo album Walk with Me with brother Declan playing on several tracks. Via Brendan's Facebook, the non-album song "She Comes at Night" was made available as a limited free download single in May 2011 and, due to popular demand, again in November 2011. Also via Brendan Murphy's Facebook page, two demos of "Shadow on the Sun" and "Raise the Dead Man", co-written with string arranger Kevin Malpass, were previewed.

== Recognition ==
- Man Alive was listed at one of Q magazine's Top 50 albums of 1992.
- In 2009, the band were voted No. 7 in the Top Irish Bands Ever category along with U2 and Thin Lizzy on Irish television's TV3.

== Discography ==
=== Albums ===
- Songs for the Tempted | CBS (1989)
- Man Alive | Sony / Columbia Records (1992, re-released Feb 1993) - UK #64
- Classified Personal | Future Inc (1999)
- Off the Record | EMI (2000)
- Heaven and Earth | Future Inc. (2004)
- Fingerprints | Future Inc./ EMI (2006)
- Live at Vicar Street | Future Inc (2009)
- Walk with Me | Brendan Murphy solo | Future Inc (2010)
- Amplifier | Future Inc (2011) - free download via official website
- Sugar Island | Future Inc (Sept 2015)
- Crescent Nights | Future Inc (Oct 2024)

=== Singles ===
- "I Just Can't Get Enough" (January 1989, IRE #18, UK # 121)
- "Drag My Bad Name Down" (March 1989, UK #131)
- "Mary" (June 1989, IRE #9, UK #109)
- "Washington Down" / "Possessed" (November 1989, IRE #9)
- "Drag My Bad Name Down (remix)" (March 1990, IRE #6, UK #79, US #77, US Cash Box #55)
- "Mary (Remix)" (May 1990, IRE #9, UK #104)
- "Baby Jesus" (October 1991, IRE #3)
- "Man Alive" (September 1992)
- "She Hits Me" (February 1993, IRE #16, UK #35)
- "I Miss You" (March 1993, UK #62)
- "Change" (Amplifier version) (March 1997, IRE #23)
- "Turn On" (unreleased Amplifier single, 1997)
- "Someone's Got to Lose" (September 1997, IRE #30)
- "Maybe It's You" (April 1999, IRE #12)
- "Change (Classified Personal Version)" (July 1999)
- "Volatile" (February 2000)
- "Mary (Super AD Remix)" (August 2000, IRE #29)
- "Sunlight" (October 2002)
- "Voice on the Radio" (April 2003)
- "U Make Me Feel" (July 2003)
- "What's to Come" (September 2006)
- "Blue" (November 2006)
- "Wildflower" (January 2007)
- "Sound of the Underground" - cover version, available on Even Better than the Real Thing Vol. 1 (2007)
- "I Guess I Wasn't Made for These Times" - limited edition free download single (May 2011)
- "She Comes at Night" | Brendan Murphy solo - limited non-album free download (May / Nov 2011)
- "Birds Eye View" (April 2015 )
