= A House =

Irish rock band

- Origin: Dublin, Ireland
- Genres: Alternative rock, indie rock
- Years active: 1985–1997
- Labels: Blanco Y Negro; Parlophone; MCA Records; Setanta Records; Sire Records
- Past members: Dave Couse; Fergal Bunbury; Martin Healy; Dermot Wylie; David Morrissey; Susan Kavanagh; David Dawson

A House were an Irish rock band active in Dublin from 1985 to 1997 and recognised for lead singer Dave Couse's distinctive vocals. The single "Endless Art" is one of their best-known charting successes.

The band's name is pronounced with "A" as the indefinite article, pronounced /æ/ or /ə/, not as the letter A (/eɪ/).

== Career ==
=== Beginnings ===
Formed in Dublin in 1985 by former members of the band Last Chance, vocalist Dave Couse, guitarist Fergal Bunbury and drummer Dermot Wylie were joined by bassist Martin Healy (who had all been friends at Templeogue College), formed as A House. The band honed their live skills in the pubs of Dublin, performing in McGonagle's club (where U2 performed in the late 1970s), at free gigs in the Phoenix Park and turns on RTÉ's TV GaGa and Dave Fanning's radio sessions.

The band's earliest recorded appearance was on a charity compilation called Blackrock Youth Aid '85, assembled at Newpark School. This was followed by tracks on two compilations. "On Your Bike Wench, and Let's Have the Back of You" appeared on the EP Live at the Underground (1986) and "What a Nice Evening to Take the Girls Up the Mountains" appeared on the Street Carnival Rock EP (1987).

Two self-released singles, "Kick Me Again Jesus" and "Snowball Down", followed, released on the label RIP Records.

=== On Our Big Fat Merry-Go-Round and I Want Too Much ===
Recording a John Peel session for BBC radio in the United Kingdom, and gaining regional popularity, the band signed with Blanco y Negro, which released the singles "Heart Happy" and "Call Me Blue" in Ireland and the UK. "Call Me Blue" was backed by a video and was relatively successful, receiving appreciable airplay and reaching number 28 in the Irish chart, as well as having some impact in the U.S. These singles were followed by A House's first album On Our Big Fat Merry-Go-Round in 1988. The band then toured with the Go-Betweens, and "Call Me Blue" reached number 3 on the Billboard college chart in 1989.

A promo version of "Call Me Blue" for the American tour includes a track labelled "Some Intense Irish Brogue" that is a short interview with the band. Following the tour, the band recorded the album I Want Too Much in 1989 on the small Irish island of Inishboffin. Press response was positive, but record sales were poor, and Blanco y Negro dropped the band. The band then signed with Setanta, a London-based independent label tending to focus on Irish acts.

Dermot Wylie also quit the band in this period and was replaced by Dave Dawson.

=== I Am the Greatest, new members and the Setanta years ===
==== Doodle and Bingo ====
Toward the end of 1990 and into 1991, Setanta released two A House EPs, Doodle and Bingo. The latter features the track "Endless Art", on which A House first worked with Orange Juice singer and Setanta bandmate Edwyn Collins as producer. The band members continued to collaborate with Collins after the band's breakup. Setanta also facilitated a relationship between A House and fellow countrymen the Frank and Walters, with members of A House contributing production work to several of their albums.

==== "Endless Art" ====
In the week that "Endless Art" became the most-played song on British radio, Setanta, a small label, could not send enough copies of the single into shops to take advantage of the popularity. Keith Cullen of Setanta had already borrow moneyed from his father to fund the recording of the song. Parlophone Records redistributed 50,000 copies, but by the time that these copies reached the shops, it was too late and the rereleased version of "Endless Art" (1992) did not receive the same radio support, although it did reach the UK Top 50.

"Endless Art" also benefitted from an accompanying stop-motion animation video that gained significant airplay on MTV in Europe, but the record failed to sell well. Nevertheless, "Endless Art" became A House's signature for many, replacing "Call Me Blue". The song, somewhat unusual in its musical approach and lyrics, begins with a quotation by Oscar Wilde and lists an extensive roster of famous artists from various forms of art, all dead, with years of births and deaths specified. Couse had frequently used the list format, beginning with the song "I Want Too Much".

A House faced criticism because all of the artists mentioned in the original "Bingo" release of the song were men, although they countered that they had thought that Joan Miró was a woman, The band tried to make amends by providing "More Endless Art", a second version of the song listing only female artists, as the B-side of the single version. The 12" single included two other tracks, "Freak Show" and "Charity", which had been recorded for the band's second John Peel session early in 1992.

==== I Am the Greatest ====
The Parlophone distribution of "Endless Art" was the flagship single from A House's new album, I Am the Greatest (1991). For the album, Parolophone again taking control of distribution from Setanta. The album represented a musical expansion for A House. Along with new drummer Dave Dawson, the recording introduced two other new members to the band. Susan Kavanagh, who had sung with a Dublin band named Giant and had been working on the TV show Jo Maxi, contributed backing vocals, and David Morrissey was added on keyboards. This new trio remained with A House until it dissolved. although they were less involved in the creative process than were the remaining original trio. However, their presence enabled A House to embrace a broader musical palette. This was enabled further on "I Am the Greatest" by Collins's production work and extra contributions by Susie Honeyman on the violin.

Lyrically, the songs on the record addressed themes running from satire of societal and religious pieties, through excruciating examinations of personal fears, to the title track, on which the three core band members ruminate in spoken-word fashion on their lives, regrets, jealousies and the state of music in the 1990s. The cover artwork was created by Fergal Bunbury with an image by Irish photographer Amelia Stein. A second single from the album, "Take It Easy on Me", was released in 1992.

=== Wide-Eyed and Ignorant and No More Apologies ===
I Am the Greatest is perhaps A House's most significant legacy, and is cited by many as one of the best ever released by an Irish band. It was followed by two more albums on Setanta. Wide-Eyed and Ignorant was released in 1994 to little notice outside of the band's fanbase, although the single "Here Come the Good Times" was A House's only UK Top 40 chart placing, reaching number 37. In 2002 the song experienced a second life on the Irish charts when it was chosen by popular vote on national radio to be rerecorded, with new lyrics, as a team anthem and charity single by the Irish soccer squad leading to the 2002 World Cup.

The band's fifth and final album, No More Apologies, was released in 1996. It was already known that A House would soon disband, but No More Apologies was described as a collection of "twisted beauties" and "disturbing melodies reflecting the world as seen through their own, strangely coloured, spectacles".

=== Breakup ===
A House disbanded in 1997. The demise was marked by an emotional concert in Dublin on 28 February, attended by the band members' families and filling the Olympia Theatre.

== Critique ==
On the release of a best-of album in 2002, The Way We Were, one British reviewer wondered whether A House were one of the great lost bands of all time or if most of the world had been right to ignore their "Gaelic charms", concluding that the answer was "a bit of both". Some critics writing around the time of A House's demise claimed that there were ways in which "A House is far more important than U2", and that "their passing also arguably [drew] the safety curtain on the first and last great pop movement this country has either seen or heard".

More than ten years after A House's breakup, many critics still held A House in high esteem. In 2008. the Irish Times rock critics voted I Am the Greatest the third-best Irish album of all time (jointly with Ghostown by the Radiators), behind only Loveless by My Bloody Valentine and Achtung Baby by U2.

== After A House ==
Following the breakup of A House, Couse and Bunbury started a new project under the moniker Lokomotiv and recorded an album that was never released. Lokomotiv only released one single, "Next Time Round", in 2000. Couse embarked on a solo career and, beginning with Genes in 2003, has released three albums, two under his own name and one billed as by Couse and the Impossible. Bunbury continues as Couse's frequent musical collaborator and live accompanist. Couse hosts a weekly music show on Irish national radio station Today FM.

Martin Healy also began several projects, including the electro-rock band Petrol with French musician Julie Peel. A more substantial effort was known as AV8 (sometimes billed as Aviate), begun in 1998 when Healy and Niamh McDonald began a writing and performing partnership, to be joined one year later by French guitarist Morgan Pincot. AV8 recorded an album called Tremor and later changed their name to Sweet Hereafter.

Since 2020, Fergal Bunbury has been issuing new recordings on Bandcamp under the name FBU62 (effboosicksteetoo).

== AHOUSEiSDEAD ==
In 2019 Bunbury and Couse reformed for a one-off gig in the National Concert Hall under the moniker "AHOUSEiSDEAD" to perform tracks from A House's 1991 album I Am the Greatest. Since then they have continued to perform together with bassist, Neil Dorrington, and drummer, Jay Ogelsby. In October 2026 they released two new songs, "Forever Mediocre" and "In My Time" from an album, Exit. No Exit., due to be released in 2027.

== Discography ==
=== Albums ===
Year	Album	UK	US	Ireland
1988	On Our Big Fat Merry-Go-Round	-	-	-
1990	I Want Too Much	-	-	-
1991	I Am the Greatest	-	-	-
1994	Wide-Eyed and Ignorant	-	-	-
1996	No More Apologies	-	-	-
1998	A House: Live in Concert (live recordings from 1990 and 1992)	-	-	-
2002	The Way We Were	-	-	10
2014	A House: Access All Areas (CD and DVD of 1992 concert)	-	-	-

=== Compilation albums ===
Year	Album
2021	Pre Extinction Tapes V: The Darker Side
2021	Pre Extinction Tapes IIIb: Greatness & Ignorance
2021	Pre Extinction Tapes IIIa: Almost Film Noir
2022	Pre Extinction Tapes IV: Because You Love Me
2023	Pre Extinction Tapes IIa: Domestic Minimalism

=== EPs ===
Year	EP	UK	US	Ireland
1987	Street Carnival Rock	-	-	-
1990	Doodle	-	-	-
1990	Bingo	-	-	-
1991	Zop	-	-	-
1994	360 North Rockingham	-	-	-
1994	A Reintroduction			

=== Compilation appearances ===
Year	Albums	UK	US
1985	Blackrock Youth Aid '85	-	-
1986	Live at the Underground	-	-
1986	Street Carnival Rock EP	-	-
1987	Heads over Ears: A Debris Compilation	-	-
1994	A Flavour of the Label (Parlophone promo)	-	-
1988	Just Say Yo	-	-
1997	The Sunday Times Music Collection: The Best of Indie	-	-
2004	The Definitive Irish Rock Album	-	-
2005	The Definitive Irish Rock Album II	-	-
2005	Fanning's Fab 50	-	-

=== Singles ===
Year	Song	UK Indie	UK	US	Ireland
1987	"Kick Me Again Jesus"	24	-	-	-
1987	"Snowball Down"	8	-	-	-
1987	"Heart Happy"	-	-	-	-
1987	"Call Me Blue"	-	194	^{1}	28
1988	"I'll Always Be Grateful"	-	-	-	22
1988	"I Want to Kill Something"	-	-	-	-
1990	"I Think I'm Going Mad"	-	-	-	22
1991	"You're Too Young"	-	-	-	-
1991	"I Don't Care"	-	-	-	-
1991	"Second Wind"	-	-	-	-
1992	"Endless Art"	-	46	-	-
1992	"Take It Easy on Me"	-	55	-	-
1992	"Everything's Gone"	-	-	-	-
1992	"Slang"	-	-	-	-
1992	"Santamental"	-	-	-	-
1994	"I Will Never Forgive You"	-	-	-	-
1994	"Why Me?"	-	52	-	20
1994	"Here Come the Good Times (Part 1)"	-	37	-	21
1995	"The Strong and the Silent"	-	-	-^{2}	-
1997	"Without Dreams"	-	-	-	-

- ^{1} - Though failing to chart on the U.S. Billboard Hot 100, the song managed to chart at No. 9 on the U.S. Billboard Modern Rock Tracks chart.
- ^{2} - Also failed to chart on the U.S. Hot 100, but the song nearly reached the Radio & Records Top 50 pop chart.

=== John Peel sessions ===
- 25 January 1987, produced by Dale Griffin:
  - "Call Me Blue" / "Y.O.U." / "Hit Me over the Head with Your Handbag Dear" / "Heart Happy"
- 2 February 1992 at Maida Vale Studio, produced by Dale Griffin:
  - "Endless Art" / "Charity" / "Freakshow" / "Force Feed"
