= I Want Too Much =

Studio album by A House
- Released: 1990
- Recorded: 1990
- Genre: Indie rock
- Length: 42:00
- Label: Sire
- Producer: Mike Hedges

A House chronology
On Our Big Fat Merry-Go-Round (1988)	I Want Too Much (1990)	I Am the Greatest (1991)

Singles from I Want Too Much
- 1. "I Think I'm Going Mad" Released: 1990

I Want Too Much is the second album from Irish rock band A House. It was released in 1990 via Sire.

I Want Too Much sold poorly. A House was dropped from its label.

== Critical reception ==
Professional ratings
Review scores
Source	Rating
AllMusic	3/5 stars

Doug Brod, in Trouser Press, stated: "This is one amazing record. From the gentle folky strum of the opening "13 Wonderful Love Songs" to "Small Talk," I Want Too Much reveals a band with an uncanny knack for witty pop that actually means something."

== Track listing ==
1. "13 Wonderful Love Songs"
2. "I Want Too Much"
3. "Talking"
4. "The Patron Saint of Mediocrity"
5. "Shivers Up My Spine"
6. "Marry Me"
7. "I Give You You"
8. "Now That I'm Sick"
9. "I Think I'm Going Mad"
10. "Bring Down the Beast"
11. "Manstrong"
12. "Keep the Homefires Burning"
13. "You'll Cry When I Die"
14. "Small Talk"
- All songs by A House.
- Produced by Mike Hedges.

"I Think I'm Going Mad" was released as a single (Blanco y Negra NEG43) with "I Want Too Much" as the B-side. The 12" and CD maxi-single versions also included "Why Must We Argue?" and "I Want Too Much, Part 3".
