= Picturehouse (band) =

Irish band

- Origin: Dublin, Ireland
- Genres: Pop; rock; power pop
- Members: Dave Browne; Johnny Boyle; Geoff Woods; Aongus Ralston; Duncan Maitland; Yann O'Brien; Esa Taponen
- Past members: Aidan Pierce; Jason Duffy; Keith Farrell; Steo Farrell; Karl Murray; Robbie Sexton; Peter Gosnell
- Website: picturehouse.ie

Picturehouse are a band from Dublin, Ireland. The band are most famous for their song "Sunburst" from the album Karmarama in Ireland.

== History ==
PictureHouse is the brainchild of Dave Browne. Originally signed to London Records in 1994, a rather tumultuous time resulted in the band returning to their native Dublin. They self-financed the release of their debut album "Shine Box". The album produced a number of popular singles such as "Somebody Somewhere", "The World and His Dog" and the smash hit "Heavenly Day". With success in their native Ireland the band toured with fellow Irish band The Saw Doctors on their UK tour in 1996. They later supported Bon Jovi in Dublin in the following year. Following this the band released 'Shine Box' across Europe following a distribution KOCH. The band toured the Nordic countries extensively in 1997.

Their second album 'Karmarama' was released in 1998 through the East-West label in Ireland. This release strengthened their presence in their native Ireland. "Sunburst" was the most played song on Irish radio in 1998, a multinational retail group put in the song in their TV campaign and the band played countless sold out shows including the legendary Olympia Theatre and the Point Depot. An award followed with Dave receiving "The Phil Lynott songwriting award" which was presented by Phil's mother in London.

More touring commenced, the band shared stages with the likes of Mel C, Texas, Meatloaf, Marillion and then an eventful arena tour with The Corrs. 2000 saw the band release the live album "Bring The House Down", again, self-released and in 2001 they set about making "Madness Sadness Gladness" with Adam Kviman in Sweden. Madness Sadness Gladness featured the massive single "Everybody Loves My Girl" -another summer smash in 2002. The pressure of constantly being self funded finally caved in and after the release of the tongue-in-cheekily titled singles collection "Get Yer Hits Out", the band went into hiatus.

Following 10-year hiatus the band were given the opportunity to begin songwriting with Lasse Anderson (Son of ABBA's Stig Anderson) produced a number of songs which Browne said "Sounded like PictureHouse". The result was "Evolution", which was released in Ireland in June 2013. Evolution features a new look PictureHouse, cowrites with Lasse Anderson and Graham Lyle, as well as appearances from Frankie Gavin of De Dannan and vocalist Ingrid Madsen.

They reformed with a brand new album "evolution" in June 2013. In February 2013 they asked fans to vote on the title of their new album. They voted to call it "Evolution". Following the success of the single Rules of Science which got considerable airplay in Ireland, The UK, Romania, Latvia, Cyprus and Indonesia, Cherry Red Records released a remastered, repackaged version of Evolution in 2014.

In 2017, they celebrated the 21st anniversary of Shine Box with a compilation album entitled "How Can I Explain How This Came To Be?" and a show in Dublin's National Concert Hall. as part of the celebrations, the band received plaudits from all round Ireland including Bono, Michael D Higgins, Ian Dempsey, Dustin The Turkey, Ray d'Arcy, Dermot and Dave, Keith Barry, Ken Doherty, Pat Shortt and The Coronas.

== Discography ==
=== Studio albums ===
Year	Album
1996	Shine Box
1998	Shine Box (reissue)
1998	Karmarama
1998	The Definitive Karmarama (reissue)
2000	Bring the House Down (live)
2000	The Definitive Shine Box (reissue)
2003	Madness, Sadness, Gladness
2004	Get Yer Hits Out! (best of)
2013	Evolution
2017	How Can I Explain How This Came to Be?
2020	1999 - Live in Dublin

=== Irish charts ===
Name	Label	Date entered	Peak position
Rules of Science	PHRC	17 March 2014	49
Everybody Loves My Girl	Wacca Wacca	27 June 2002	17
She	Wacca Wacca	5 April 2001	27
Love in the Streets	East West	18 February 1999	27
All the Time in the World	East West	5 November 1998	29
Sunburst	East West	27 August 1998	18

=== Compilations ===
Picturehouse performed a cover version of "Sweet Dreams My LA Ex" and a hidden track of "Papa Don't Preach" on Even Better than the Real Thing Vol. 1 and "Who's Gonna Ride Your Wild Horses" on Even Better Than the Real Thing Vol. 3.
