= Epilepsy Ireland =

Irish charity

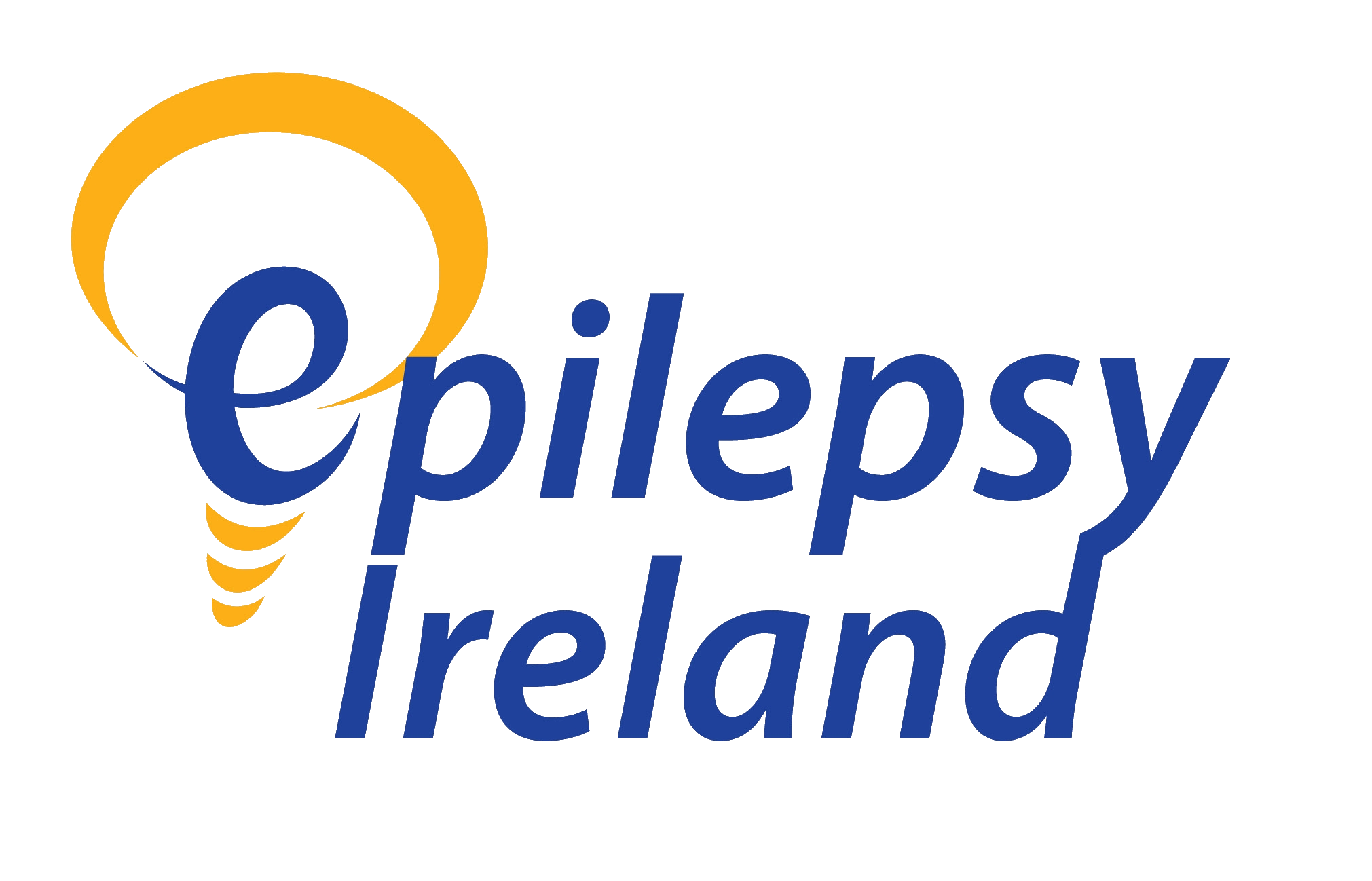
- The current logo, in use since 2013
- Formation: 4 October 1966; 60 years ago
- Founded at: Royal College of Physicians
- Type: CLG
- Registration no.: 77588
- Location: Ireland
- Members: 2,500 (1980)
- Website: epilepsy.ie
- Formerly called: Irish Epilepsy Association (1966–1980); Brainwave (1980–2013)

Epilepsy Ireland is an Irish charity that provides support, information and advice to people with epilepsy. Founded in 1966, the organisation is based in Dublin, with nine regional offices throughout Ireland.

== History ==
The organisation was founded as the Irish Epilepsy Association on 4 October 1966 following an inaugural meeting held in the Royal College of Physicians on Kildare Street, Dublin among various physicians.

On 30 October 1967, a seminar was opened by the then Minister for Health, Seán Flanagan in the Intercontinental Hotel in Dublin. It was organised by the charity and was attended by more than 400 doctors, social workers and employers. The minister emphasised the importance of early diagnosis and educating the general public about the condition.

As of March 1980, there were about 2,500 members and the registered address was at Dawson Street. The charity was registered as a company on 16 September 1980 as Brainwave - The Irish Epilepsy Association and is recorded on the charity register as the official name of the organisation. On 7 February 2013, the organisation was rebranded as Epilepsy Ireland.
