= Johnny Boyle =

Irish musician

Johnny Boyle is the drummer of Irish band The Frames. He first came to the attention of the Irish music scene when he joined Picture House before the release of their second album, Karmarama. He left the band shortly after the third studio album, Madness, Sadness, Gladness (on which he co-wrote the song "Lonely Like The Sun") to join Marianne Faithfull on tour.

He then joined The Frames initially as a session drummer, but joined the band full-time soon after. He has also played on the Once tour with Glen Hansard and Marketa Irglova.

He resides in Dublin with his wife and two daughters.
