= The Frank and Walters =

Irish alternative pop band

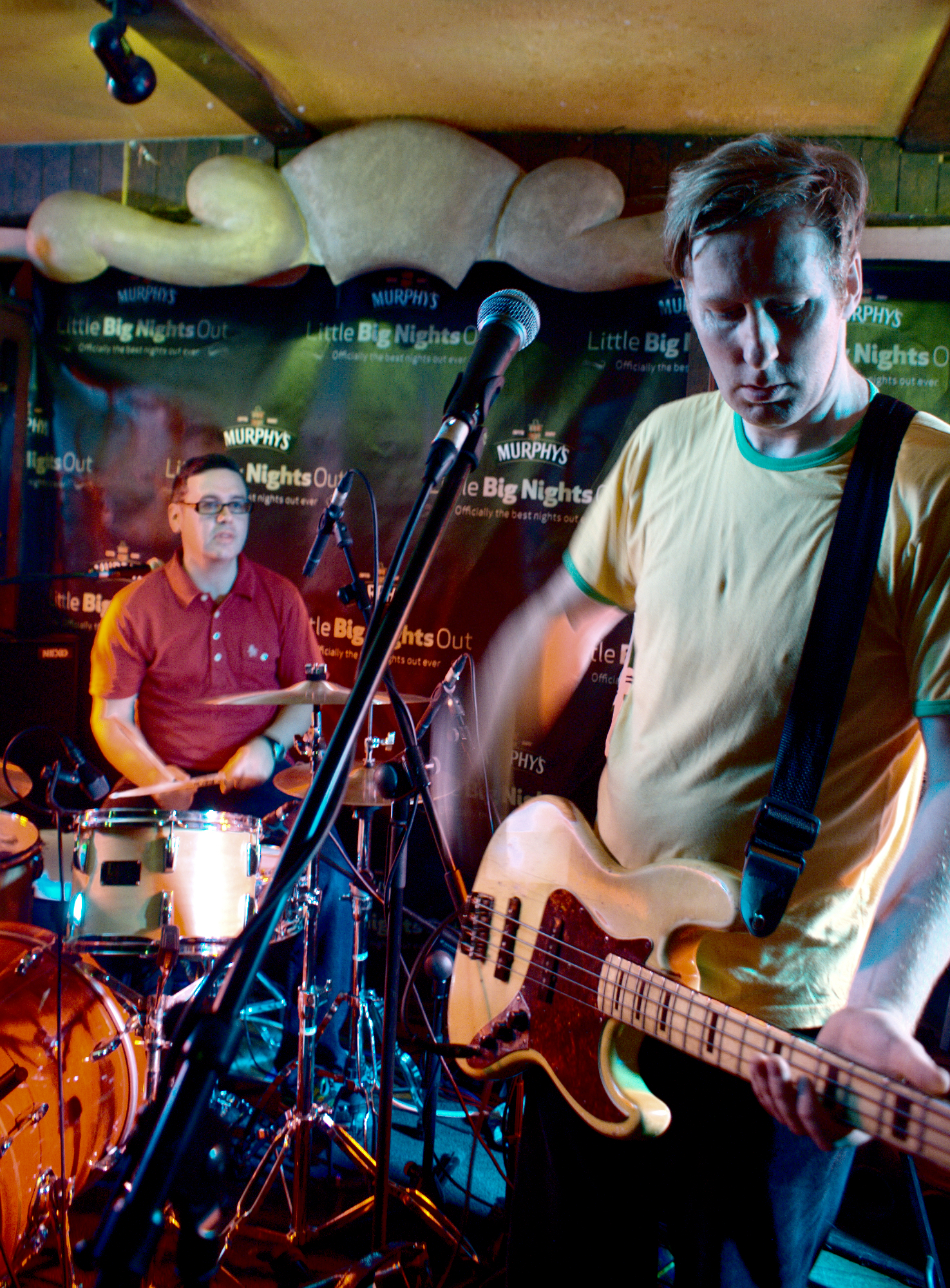
- The Franks performing in Cork in September 2009

Background information
- Origin: Cork, Ireland
- Genres: Alternative rock, indie pop
- Years active: 1989–present
- Labels: Setanta (1991); Go! Discs (1992); Fresh Indie Frontal Attack Records (2005)
- Members: Paul Linehan; Ashley Keating; Rory Murphy; Cian Corbett
- Past members: Niall Linehan; Kevin Pedreschi
- Website: Fan Site

The Frank and Walters are an alternative pop band from Cork city in Ireland. The band was founded in 1989 and named in honour of two eccentric Cork characters.

== Members ==
The original band line-up included Paul Linehan (vocalist and bassist), his brother Niall Linehan (guitarist), and Ashley Keating (drums). Niall Linehan was replaced as guitarist in 2004 by Kevin Pedreschi, who was in turn replaced by Rory Murphy in 2010. Cian Corbett joined on keyboard duties in 2005.

== Career ==
Signing for the Setanta label in 1991, the group debuted with the release EP1, and the lead track "Fashion Crisis Hits New York" became an indie hit. The follow-up EP EP.2 was released soon after, which was followed by the band's signing to the Go! Discs label, where The Frank and Walters partnered with producer Edwyn Collins to record the Happy Busman EP. They found success in the UK, and, following a tour in support of Carter USM, an Ian Broudie radio edit of the LP song "After All" reached the Top 20 in the UK Singles Chart, peaking at No. 11. It reached No. 5 in the Irish chart. The group appeared on BBC Television's Top of the Pops supporting the single.

After a long sabbatical which they attributed to a "fear of music", the group returned with Grand Parade (with contributions from Gus Dudgeon) on 23 June 1997, and the Indian Ocean EP later in the year. These were followed with Beauty Becomes More Than Life in 1998 and Glass in 2000. Setanta released a well-received Best Of in 2002. In 2004, Niall Linehan left and was replaced by a friend of the band, Kevin Pedreschi. The band signed a new deal with FIFA Records, and released a retrospective triple album, Souvenirs, in October 2005. A further album, A Renewed Interest in Happiness, was released on 27 October 2006. The band released a comeback single in 2010 entitled "The Parson", as part of their "Seasonal Single Releases" project, which saw the band release a single per season. "The Parson" launched as the spring-season single, with "Let It Out" following in summer, "The Clock" in autumn, and the Christmas-themed "Song for a Future Love" in December.

Together with The Sultans of Ping FC and Power of Dreams, The Franks (as they are sometimes known by fans) played a number of co-headlining shows as part of the Reverberation Tour in December 2010. They also toured several festivals in 2011, including Vantastival and Indiependence.

The band returned to the studio in August 2011 to work on a new album, released in March 2012. The first single from this album, Indie Love Song, was released on 14 February (Valentine's Day) 2012 and supported by a UK tour. Their sixth studio album, Greenwich Mean Time, was released on 9 March 2012. The album was well received and supported by tours in Europe, USA and Japan.

In September 2012 The Frank and Walters undertook a 20th-anniversary celebration tour marking their debut album Trains, Boats and Planes, and in May 2015 released a single titled "Look at Us Now".

The band embarked on a celebratory tour during October 2017, to mark 20 years since the release of their second album Grand Parade.

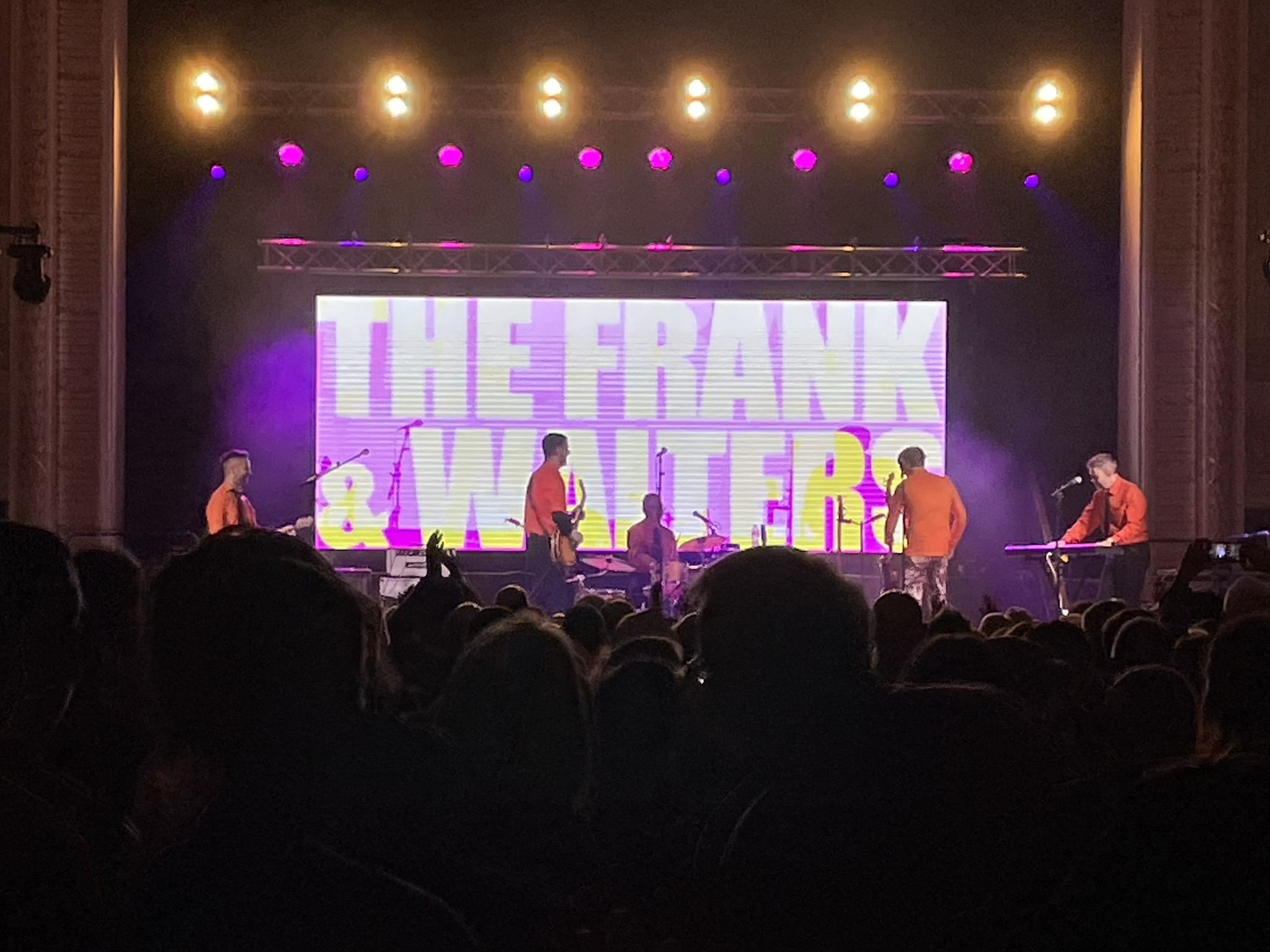
The Frank and Walters performing at Cork City Hall in December 2025

In March 2018, approximately 25 years after its original release, a cover of the Frank and Walters single "After All" featured in the TV series The Young Offenders, and subsequently charted at No. 2 in the iTunes downloads chart for Ireland. The band appeared and played the song in a later series of the TV show.

== Discography ==
Studio albums

- Trains, Boats and Planes (October 1992, UK No. 36)
- Grand Parade (June 1997)
- Beauty Becomes More Than Life (1999)
- Glass (October 2000)
- Souvenirs (October 2005)
- A Renewed Interest in Happiness (October 2006)
- Greenwich Mean Time (March 2012)
- Songs for the Walking Wounded (April 2016)

Compilation albums

- Best Of (August 2002)
- Souvenirs (October 2005)

Singles

- "EP 1" (July 1997)
- "EP 2" (October 1997)
- "Happy Busman" (March 1992, UK No. 49)
- "This Is Not a Song" (September 1992, UK No. 46)
- "After All" (December 1992, IRE No. 5, UK No. 11)
- "Fashion Crisis Hits New York" (April 1993, IRE No. 28, UK No. 42)
- "Indian Ocean" (June 1996, UK No. 83)
- "Colours" (August 1996)
- "How Can I Exist" (1997)
- "Plenty Times" (October 1999)
- "Something Happened to Me" (February 2000, UK No. 91)
- "Underground" (January 2001)
- "You Asked Me" (September 2005)
- "Miles and Miles" (September 2006, IRE No. 20)
- "Fight" (27 April 2007)
- "City Lights" (26 October 2007)
- "The Parson" (23 April 2010)
- "Let It Out" (30 July 2010)
- "The Clock" (22 October 2010)
- "Song for a Future Love" (10 December 2010)
- "Indie Love Song" (14 February 2012)
- "Loneliness and Sweet Romance" (8 June 2012)
- "Look At Us Now" (15 May 2015)
- "We Are The Young Men" (25 March 2016)
- "Stages" (8 July 2016)
- "Goddess Of Athena" (25 November 2016)
