= Setanta Records =

Setanta Records was a British independent record label led by founder Keith Cullen. Setanta published UK and Irish indie music in the late 1980s and in the 1990s.

== History ==
Setanta Records was started in a Camberwell, London squat by former bicycle courier Keith Cullen. Their first success came when Dublin band Into Paradise received positive reviews from the British music press for their Setanta debut titled Under the Water. Major label interest followed and Into Paradise subsequently signed to Ensign Records retaining Cullen as band manager. Shortly thereafter, Cullen signed the Cork trio the Frank and Walters, who wore orange shirts and purple flared trousers. As with Into Paradise, the band signed to Go! Discs retaining Cullen as band manager. The Frank and Walters achieved minor commercial success when their song "After All" peaked at number 11 on the UK Singles Chart.

Commercial success followed Cullen's signing of the Divine Comedy whose first three albums Liberation, Promenade and Casanova were well received in the UK and Europe. The Divine Comedy also provided the soundtrack for the Channel 4 sitcom Father Ted. Despite label boss Cullen not thinking that the song was commercially promising, Setanta also had chart success with the Edwyn Collins (former frontman of Scotland's Orange Juice on Postcard Records) hit "A Girl Like You" which went on to become successful in several national charts.

In the late 1990s, the label turned down the Magnetic Fields' album 69 Love Songs, which ended up being a critical and commercial success. In 2007, Setanta signed London band The Tacticians. Their debut album Some Kind of Urban Fulfilment was released on Setanta in August 2007. In 2012, Cullen announced that he was closing Setanta down.

== Selected artists ==
- A House
- Brian
- Catchers
- The Chalets
- Evan Dando
- The Divine Comedy
- Edwyn Collins
- Five Go Down to the Sea?
- The Frank and Walters
- Richard Hawley
- Hem
- Into Paradise
- Mason Jennings
- The Prayer Boat
- Josh Ritter
- Verbena
- The Glee Club

== Sources ==
- Ireland's Hotpress Yearbook (2006)
