= The Divine Comedy discography =

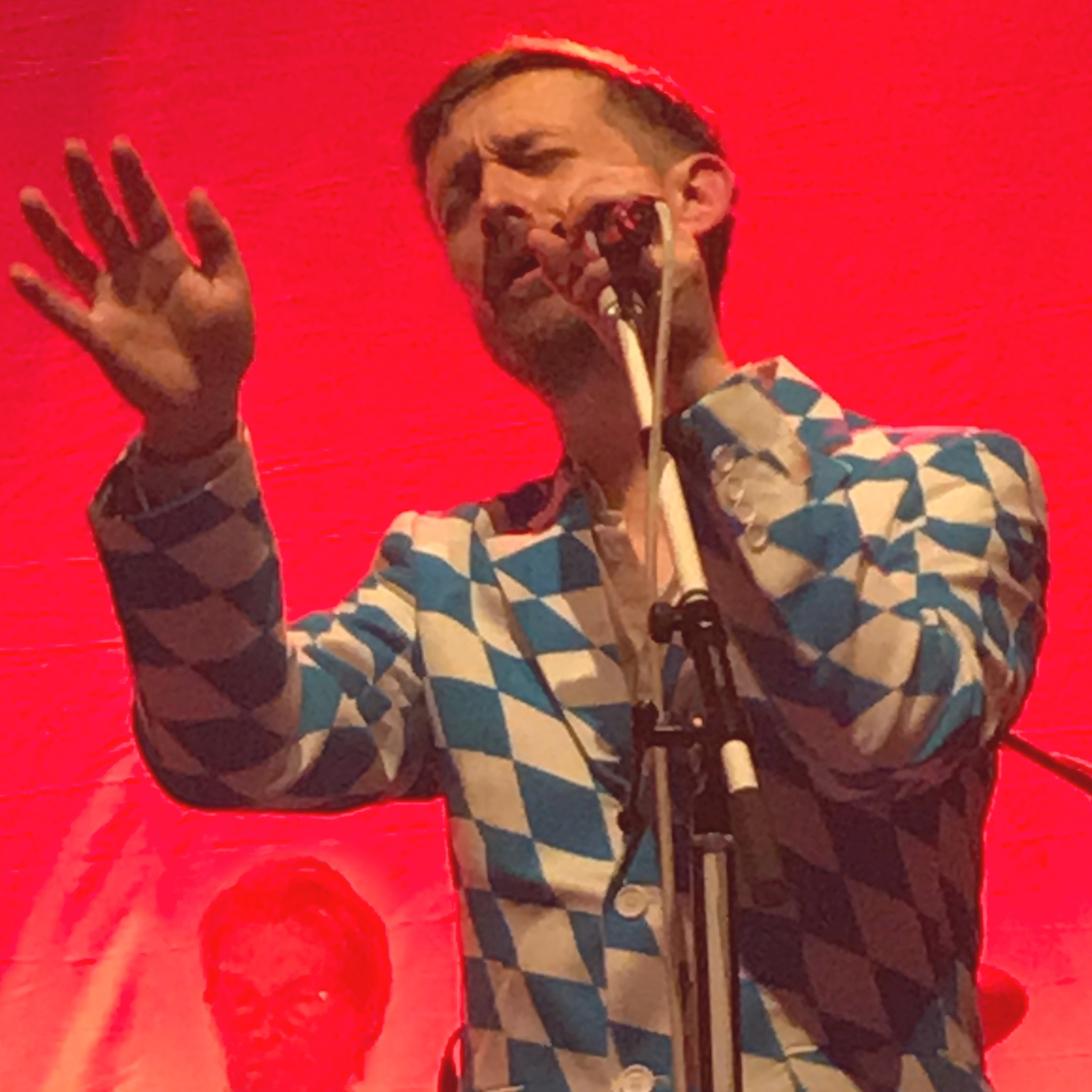
- Studio albums: 13
- EPs: 5
- Live albums: 2
- Compilation albums: 2
- Singles: 26
- Box sets: 1

The discography of Northern Irish chamber pop band the Divine Comedy consists of thirteen studio albums, two live albums, two compilation albums, five extended plays and twenty-six singles.

== Albums ==
=== Studio albums ===
Title	Album details	Peak chart positions										Certifications
Title	Album details	UK	UK Indie	BEL	EUR	FRA	GER	IRE	SPA	SWI	SCO	Certifications
Fanfare for the Comic Muse	Released: July 1990; Label: Setanta (SET2)	—	—	—	—	—	—	—	—	—	—	
Liberation	Released: 16 August 1993; Label: Setanta (SET11)	—	39 (Note: Liberation peaked at No. 39 in October 2020 when re-issued on their own label Divine Comedy)	—	—	—	—	—	—	—	—	
Promenade	Released: 28 March 1994; Label: Setanta (SET13)	—	29 (Note: Promenade peaked at No. 29 in October 2020 when re-issued on their own label Divine Comedy)	—	—	—	—	—	—	—	—	
Casanova	Released: 29 April 1996; Label: Setanta (SET25)	48	24 (Note: Casanova peaked at No. 24 in October 2020 when re-issued on their own label Divine Comedy)	—	—	—	—	—	—	—	73	UK: Gold
A Short Album About Love	Released: 10 February 1997; Label: Setanta (SET36)	13	21 (Note: A Short Album About Love peaked at No. 21 in October 2020 when re-issued on their own label Divine Comedy)	—	65	—	—	8	—	—	22	UK: Silver
Fin de Siècle	Released: 31 August 1998; Label: Setanta (SET57)	9	1	—	38	23	—	4	—	—	16	UK: Gold
Regeneration	Released: 12 March 2001; Label: Parlophone (5317612)	14	40 (Note: Regeneration peaked at No. 40 in October 2020 when re-issued on their own label Divine Comedy)	—	39	21	—	15	—	—	16	UK: Silver
Absent Friends	Released: 29 March 2004; Label: Parlophone (5962802)	23	34 (Note: Absent Friends peaked at No. 34 in October 2020 when re-issued on their own label Divine Comedy)	—	—	20	—	6	—	—	23	
Victory for the Comic Muse	Released: 19 June 2006; Label: Parlophone (3653722)	43	47 (Note: Victory for the Comic Muse peaked at No. 47 in October 2020 when re-issued on their own label Divine Comedy)	—	—	33	83	22	—	87	49	
Bang Goes the Knighthood	Released: 31 May 2010; Label: Divine Comedy (DCRL101)	20	3	34	—	27	—	8	83	—	31	
Foreverland	Released: 2 September 2016; Label: Divine Comedy (DCRL107)	7	1	31	—	18	41	3	33	36	9	
Office Politics	Released: 7 June 2019; Label: Divine Comedy (DCRL112)	5	1	159	—	42	51	9	33	78	2	
Rainy Sunday Afternoon	Released: 19 September 2025; Label: Divine Comedy	4	1	89	—	—	40	41	—	38	2	
"—" denotes items that did not chart or were not released in that territory.

=== Live albums ===
Title	Album details	Peak chart positions	Notes
Title	Album details	UK Indie	Notes
Live at Somerset House	Released: 25 April 2011; Label: Concert Live (CLCD288)	—	Recorded live at Somerset House, London on 17 July 2010; 24-track double-CD digipack
Loose Canon: Live in Europe 2016–2017	Released: 16 February 2018; Label: Divine Comedy (DCRL111)	25	Recorded live from their European tours of 2016 and 2017; 17-track CD included an interpretation of New Order's "Blue Monday"
"—" denotes items that did not chart or were not released in that territory.

=== Compilation albums ===
Title	Album details	Peak chart positions						Certifications
Title	Album details	UK	UK Indie	UK Vinyl	EUR	IRE	SCO	Certifications
A Secret History... The Best of the Divine Comedy	Released: 30 August 1999; Label: Setanta (SET100)	3	1	—	22	2	6	UK: Gold
Charmed Life – The Best of the Divine Comedy	Released: 4 February 2022; Label: Divine Comedy	5	1	—	—	5	—	
"—" denotes items that did not chart or were not released in that territory.

=== Box sets ===
Title	Album details	Peak chart positions	
Title	Album details	UK Indie	UK Vinyl
Venus, Cupid, Folly and Time – Thirty Years of the Divine Comedy	Released: 9 October 2020; Label: Divine Comedy (DCRL117)	6	8

== Extended plays ==
Year	Title	Tracks
1991	Timewatch	Timewatch; Jerusalem; The Rise and Fall
1992	Europop	Europop; New Wave; Intifada; Monitor; Timewatch; Jerusalem; The Rise and Fall
1993	Indulgence No. 1	Hate My Way; Untitled Melody; Europe by Train
1994	Indulgence No. 2	A Drinking Song; When the Lights Go Out All Over Europe; Tonight We Fly
2004	Bavarian EP	No One Knows (Recorded Live At The Dublin Gaiety 2004); Our Mutual Friend (Live Demo From 2003); Three Sisters (Recorded Live At The Dublin Gaiety 2004)

== Singles ==
Year	Title	Peak chart positions					Album
Year	Title	UK	UK Indie	EUR	IRE	SCO	Album
1993	"Lucy"	—	—	—	—	—	Liberation
1996	"Something for the Weekend"	14	—	88	—	14	Casanova
1996	"Becoming More Like Alfie"	27	—	—	—	21	Casanova
1996	"The Frog Princess"	15	—	—	—	14	Casanova
1997	"Everybody Knows (Except You)"	14	—	61	23	10	A Short Album About Love
1998	"I've Been to a Marvellous Party"	28	—	—	—	—	Twentieth-Century Blues: The Songs of Noël Coward
1998	"Generation Sex"	19	5	80	24	15	Fin de Siècle
1998	"The Certainty of Chance"	49	10	—	—	49	Fin de Siècle
1999	"National Express"	8	2	36	18	7	Fin de Siècle
1999	"The Pop Singer's Fear of the Pollen Count"	17	3	58	24	13	A Secret History... The Best of the Divine Comedy
1999	"Gin Soaked Boy"	38	15	—	—	54	A Secret History... The Best of the Divine Comedy
2001	"Love What You Do"	26	—	90	48	24	Regeneration
2001	"Bad Ambassador"	34	—	—	—	33	Regeneration
2001	"Perfect Lovesong"	42	—	—	—	46	Regeneration
2004	"Come Home Billy Bird"	25	—	—	34	26	Absent Friends
2004	"Absent Friends"	38	—	—	—	49	Absent Friends
2006	"Diva Lady"	52	—	—	36	37	Victory for the Comic Muse
2006	"To Die a Virgin"	67	—	—	—	45	Victory for the Comic Muse
2006	"A Lady of a Certain Age"	—	—	—	—	—	Victory for the Comic Muse
2010	"At the Indie Disco"	173	17	—	—	—	Bang Goes the Knighthood
2010	"I Like"	—	—	—	—	—	Bang Goes the Knighthood
2016	"Catherine the Great"	—	—	—	—	—	Foreverland
2016	"How Can You Leave Me on My Own"	—	—	—	—	—	Foreverland
2017	"To the Rescue"	—	—	—	—	—	Foreverland
2019	"Queuejumper"	—	—	—	—	—	Office Politics
2019	"Norman and Norma"	—	—	—	—	—	Office Politics
2019	"Infernal Machines"	—	—	—	—	—	Office Politics
2019	"Don't Mention the War"	—	—	—	—	—	Modern Love: Season 1
2021	"The Best Mistakes"	—	—	—	—	—	Charmed Life – The Best of The Divine Comedy
2021	"Home for the Holidays"	—	—	—	—	—	Charmed Life – The Best of The Divine Comedy
2025	"Achilles"	—	—	—	—	—	Rainy Sunday Afternoon
"—" denotes items that did not chart or were not released in that territory.

== DVDs ==
- Live at the Palladium (2004) – with the Millennia Ensemble

== Contributions ==
Appearing as either the Divine Comedy or Neil Hannon:

- "Life's What You Make It", on the various artists compilation album Volume 9 (1994)
- "There Is a Light That Never Goes Out", on the various artists Smiths tribute album The Smiths Is Dead (1996)
- "All Mine", a duet with Tom Jones, on his album Reload (1999)
- "I've Been to a Marvelous Party", on the various artists Noël Coward tribute album Twentieth-Century Blues: The Songs of Noël Coward (1998)
- "No Regrets" (backing vocals), on the Robbie Williams album I've Been Expecting You (1998)
- "The Dead Only Quickly", on the 6ths' album Hyacinths and Thistles (1999)
- "Life on Mars", with Yann Tiersen, on his album Black Session (1999)
- "The Good Life" and "The Good Life (piano version)", on the Gangster No. 1 soundtrack (2000)
- "Les Jours Tristes", with Yann Tiersen, on his album L'Absente (2001)
- "Jacky", on the various artists Jacques Brel tribute album Next: A Tribute to Jacques Brel (2004)
- "October", on the various artists U2 tribute album Even Better Than the Real Thing Vol. 3 (2005)
- "So Long and Thanks for All the Fish (Reprise)" and "Vote Beeblebrox" (co-vocals), on the Hitchhiker's Guide to the Galaxy soundtrack (2005)
- "Home", on the Jane Birkin album Fictions (2006)
- "Three Cheers for Pooh, Cottleston Pie, Piglet Ho", on the various artists charity album Colours Are Brighter (2006)
- "Aliens", on the various artists charity album The Cake Sale (2006)
- "Love Don't Roam" and "Song for Ten", on the Doctor Who: Original Television Soundtrack (2006)
- "Take Me Away", on Pugwash's album Eleven Modern Antiquities (2008)
- "Our Love Goes Deeper Than This" by Duke Special, on the 2-CD version of Songs from the Deep Forest (2006)
- "Somewhere Between Waking and Sleeping", on Air's album Pocket Symphony (2007)
- "Perfection as a Hipster", by God Help the Girl, from the soundtrack album God Help the Girl (2009)
- "Oscar the Hypno-Dog", on the various artists charity album Oscar the Hypno-Dog and Other Tails (2012)
