= Andrew Skeet =

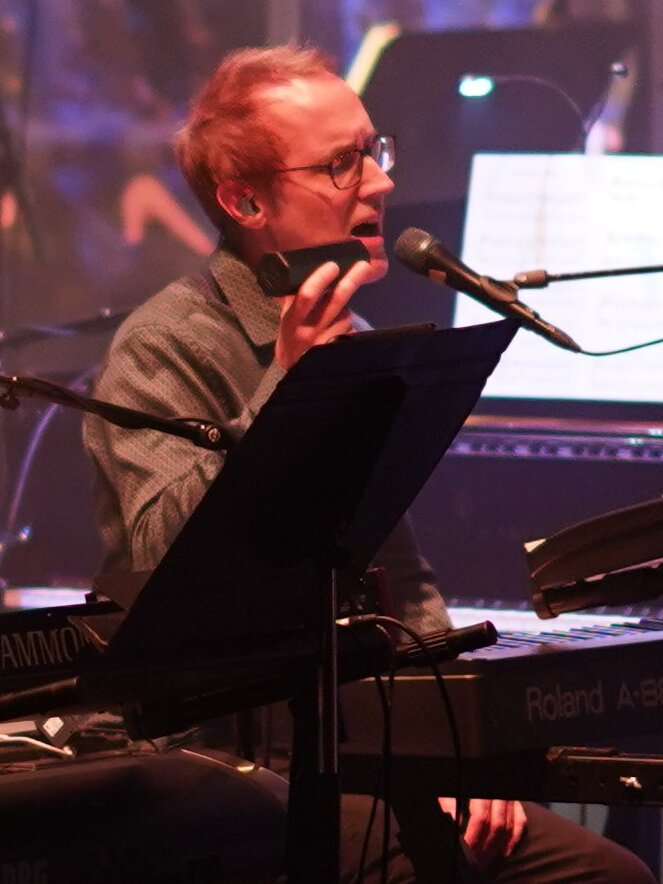

Background information
- Born: Andrew John Skeet; 1969 (age 56–57)
- Origin: Croydon, London, England
- Genres: Film; classical; video game; electronic; chamber pop
- Occupations: Composer; orchestrator; conductor
- Years active: 1990s–present
- Member of: The Divine Comedy
- Website: www.andrewskeet.com

Andrew John Skeet (born 1969 in Croydon) is an English musician, composer and music producer. He has written scores for television and film and worked with many well-known composers and artists as an arranger, orchestrator and conductor.

== Biography ==
Andrew Skeet attended Trinity Boys School in Croydon where, as a boy singer, he appeared on soundtracks such as Monty Python's The Meaning of Life, Barbra Streisand's Yentl and Another Country starring Rupert Everett as Guy Bennett and Colin Firth as Tommy Judd. Skeet then studied music at the University of East Anglia and at the Royal College of Music in London.

== Professional life ==
=== Television and film commissions ===
With former Howie B collaborator Luke Gordon, Skeet established the production company Roxbury Music and their music has been used extensively on British television. Programmes which have featured music by Roxbury include The Apprentice, Dispatches, Banged Up Abroad, Britain's Lost World, Freaky Eaters, What Katie Did Next, Gumball's 3000 Miles, Kali, a collaboration with Mike Figgis for the BFI London Film Festival and Locked Up Abroad. Their music has been heard all over the world with tracks released on a series of library albums for Universal on the Atmosphere label, Chappell and Bruton.

Skeet has scored several feature-length documentaries including Don't F**k with Cats: Hunting an Internet Killer, Silk Road: Drugs, Death and the Dark Web, Destination Unknown and How to Re-Establish a Vodka Empire and has released two acclaimed and highly successful albums of video game music with the London Philharmonic Orchestra.

=== Composer ===
Skeet was signed to Sony Classics in 2014 and released his first solo album, Finding Time.

=== Collaborations ===
Skeet is a member of Neil Hannon's the Divine Comedy and has worked as an arranger and orchestrator for artists such as George Michael, Sinéad O'Connor, Suede and James Lavelle's Unkle. With Neil Hannon he has toured regularly as music director and keyboard player of the Divine Comedy following the departure of Joby Talbot and has appeared on three albums as arranger and conductor; Hannon's ninth album Victory for the Comic Muse, released in June 2006, 2010's Bang Goes the Knighthood and the 2016 release Foreverland.

In November 2010 Skeet collaborated with Grammy Award-winning artist Imogen Heap on an orchestral score played live to picture called Love the Earth, which premiered at the Royal Albert Hall. They also worked together on a choral commission for the Bird's Eye Festival at the BFI – an a cappella choral score to the first ever surrealist film The Seashell and the Clergyman (Germaine Dulac, 1928) with the Holst Singers. Skeet regularly works with TV and film composer Daniel Pemberton as orchestrator and conductor on many movies and TV shows including Steve Jobs, The Man from U.N.C.L.E., All the Money in the World, King Arthur, Molly's Game, Gold, Desperate Romantics, Occupation, Hiroshima, Monster Moves, Money and the 2010 revival of Upstairs Downstairs. He has worked with Welsh electronic music group Hybrid contributing orchestral and string arrangements to Morning Sci-Fi and Disappear Here.

Skeet has worked as an orchestrator on several feature films including Ridley Scott's Robin Hood, Garth Jennings' The Hitchhiker's Guide to the Galaxy, Basil Dearden's The League of Gentlemen and as lead orchestrator and conductor on Nick Murphy's feature The Awakening starring Rebecca Hall, Dominic West and Imelda Staunton.

== Compositions, arrangements, orchestrations and recordings ==
This is a partial list.

=== With the Divine Comedy ===
- 2006 – Victory for the Comic Muse (arranger, keyboards)
- 2010 – Bang Goes the Knighthood (arranger, keyboards)
- 2016 – Foreverland (arranger, keyboards)
- 2019 – Office Politics (arranger, keyboards)

=== With Hybrid ===
- 2003 – Morning Sci-Fi (orchestrator, arranger)
- 2010 – Disappear Here (orchestrator, arranger)

=== With Imogen Heap ===
- 2010 – The Seashell and the Clergyman (arranger)
- 2011 – Love the Earth (orchestrator)

=== With Anthony Phillips as Skeet & Phillips ===
- 2012 – Seventh Heaven (arranger, composer)

=== As composer ===
The following are library albums for Universal; each album presented contains tracks by Skeet.

- from The Piano Album (ATMOS289)
- from Timeless Scenes for Orchestra Music: Music for Widescreen Drama and Documentary (with Anthony Phillips) (ATMOS288)
- from UPPM Sampler 5 (UNIPPMSAMP05)
- Independent Film Score (ATMOS281)
- from Summer Songs (ATMOS280)
- from Little Pictures, Big Ideas (BIGS019)
- from The Movie Soundtrack 2 (ATMOS274)
- from Hope (ATV10B)
- from The Orchestra Plugged (with Luke Gordon) (ATMOS249a and b)
- from Create 04 (with Luke Gordon) (ATMOS248)
- Seriously Quirky (with Luke Gordon) (CHAP328)
- from Classical Remix (with Luke Gordon) (BR481)
- 2007 – 3000 Miles: Gumball 3000 (with Luke Gordon)
- 2011 – How to Re-Establish a Vodka Empire (City of Prague Philharmonic Orchestra)
- 2014 – Destination Unknown
- 2014 – Finding Time (artist on Sony Classics)

=== As orchestrator ===
- 2005 – The Movies (video game) (conductor: jazz and rock music, orchestrator)
- 2007 – Heroes and Villains
- 2009 – Desperate Romantics (with Daniel Pemberton)
- 2010 – Upstairs Downstairs (with Daniel Pemberton) (arranger, orchestrator)
- 2011 – The Awakening (with Daniel Pemberton) (orchestrator, conductor)
- 2013 – The Counsellor (with Daniel Pemberton) (orchestrator, conductor)
- 2014 – Cuban Fury (with Daniel Pemberton) (orchestrator, conductor)
- 2015 – Woman in Gold (with Martin Phipps) (orchestrator, conductor)
- 2015 – The Man from U.N.C.L.E. (with Daniel Pemberton) (orchestrator, conductor)
- 2015 – Steve Jobs (with Daniel Pemberton) (orchestrator, conductor)
- 2016 – War & Peace (with Martin Phipps) (orchestrator, conductor)
- 2016 – Victoria (with Ruth Barrett) (orchestrator, conductor)
- 2017 – All the Money in the World (with Daniel Pemberton) (orchestrator, conductor)
- 2017 – Molly's Game (with Daniel Pemberton) (orchestrator, conductor)
- 2017 – Black Mirror (with Daniel Pemberton) (orchestrator, conductor)
- 2018 – Spider-Man: Into the Spider-Verse (with Daniel Pemberton) (orchestrator, conductor)
- 2026 – Project Hail Mary (with Daniel Pemberton) (score orchestrator)

=== As conductor and producer ===
- 2011 – The Greatest Video Game Music (London Philharmonic Orchestra) (producer, conductor)
- 2012 – The Greatest Video Game Music 2 (London Philharmonic Orchestra) (producer, conductor)
