= The Duckworth Lewis Method (band) =

Irish pop group

- Origin: Ireland
- Genres: Pop music, Cricket poetry
- Years active: 2009–present
- Label: Divine Comedy Records / 1969 Records
- Members: Neil Hannon; Thomas Walsh
- Website: www.dlmethod.co.uk/

The Duckworth Lewis Method are a cricket-themed Irish pop group formed by Neil Hannon of The Divine Comedy and Thomas Walsh of Pugwash. The Duckworth Lewis Method (named after the cricket formula) is also the title of the group's first album, which was released on 3 July 2009, a few days before the start of the 2009 Ashes series. A concept album about cricket, the album has 12 tracks, one of which is an instrumental. The album was mixed and recorded in Dublin and was mastered at Abbey Road Studios.

Hannon and Walsh have described their album as "a kaleidoscopic musical adventure through the beautiful and rather silly world of cricket." The track "Jiggery Pokery" is a comic retelling of the Ball of the Century incident involving Shane Warne and Mike Gatting, and features guest cameo performances from Phill Jupitus, Alexander Armstrong, Matt Berry and more. Berry also features on the track "Mason on the Boundary".

On 9 September 2009 the band were put on hiatus. They wrote and recorded the theme song for the ESPNcricinfo video blog The Two Chucks. In April 2010 The Duckworth Lewis Method album was nominated for an Ivor Novello Award. In an interview with the BBC, Neil Hannon confirmed that he and Thomas Walsh would be working together again in the future.

In late October 2012 Hannon and Walsh confirmed they were working on a second Duckworth Lewis album. Recording sessions began in early 2013 with the intention of releasing the new recording in time for the Ashes series in the summer. In May 2013 the release date for Sticky Wickets was announced. The album came out on 28 June in Ireland and 1 July elsewhere. The release was celebrated with a short concert in Tower Records, Dublin, on 3 July. The album features cameo performances from Stephen Fry, Daniel Radcliffe, Henry Blofeld, Matt Berry, and Neil Finn.

== Promotion ==
On 21 May 2009, Today on BBC Radio 4 ran a short feature on the album, asking "Why aren't there more songs about cricket?" in which entertainment reporter (and 2006 Daily Telegraph Fantasy Cricket champion) Colin Paterson interviewed Hannon and Walsh about the album.

On 16 July 2009 the band appeared on the BBC's Test Match Special during the lunch break on the first day of the second Ashes Test match against the Australian team at Lord's. They sang a new song named "Test Match Special".

"The Age of Revolution" was released as a download-only single on 28 June 2009. It was announced that a limited one-track physical promotional copy of the single would be available to press. The song reflects the spread of cricket to Britain's colonies, particularly India.

Hannon and Walsh were interviewed for The Chap (Aug/9 Sep Issue) about the album and cricket. Amongst the points covered were a peerage for umpire Dickie Bird, the renaming of The Oval as The Ovaltine and the reduction of cricket beyond Twenty20 to just a coin toss.

== Discography ==
=== Eponymous album ===
All songs written and composed by Neil Hannon and Thomas Walsh.

==== Track listing ====
No.	Title	Length
1.	"The Coin Toss"	1:08
2.	"The Age of Revolution"	3:56
3.	"Gentlemen And Players"	3:18
4.	"The Sweet Spot"	3:06
5.	"Jiggery Pokery"	3:23
6.	"Mason on The Boundary"	4:22
7.	"Rain Stops Play"	1:13
8.	"Meeting Mr. Miandad"	3:12
9.	"The Nightwatchman"	4:49
10.	"Flatten The Hay"	4:18
11.	"Test Match Special"	4:02
12.	"The End of The Over"	2:50

=== Sticky Wickets ===
==== Track listing ====
No.	Title	Length
1.	"Sticky Wickets"	4:15
2.	"Boom Boom Afridi"	3:11
3.	"It's Just Not Cricket"	3:25
4.	"The Umpire"	4:23
5.	"Third Man"	4:03
6.	"Chin Music"	2:04
7.	"Out in the Middle"	4:36
8.	"Line And Length"	3:40
9.	"The Laughing Cavaliers"	2:38
10.	"Judd's Paradox"	4:16
11.	"Mystery Man"	4:06
12.	"Nudging And Nurdling"	5:21

== See also ==
- 2009 in Irish music
- Duckworth-Lewis method
