= Sunrise (The Divine Comedy song) =

Song by the Divine Comedy

from the album Fin de Siècle
- Released: 31 August 1998
- Recorded: 1998
- Length: 3:17
- Label: Setanta
- Songwriter: Neil Hannon
- Producer: Jon Jacobs

"Sunrise" is a song by Irish band the Divine Comedy, and is the tenth and final track on their 1998 album Fin de Siècle.

== Background ==
The song is about songwriter Neil Hannon's upbringing during the Troubles in Northern Ireland, and refers to Derry and Enniskillen (as well as Derry's official name, Londonderry, and Enniskillen's Irish name, Inis Ceithleann).

Hannon has said he felt compelled to write something about the troubles and this song was the result. The song has been acclaimed for its poignant subject matter and is one of Hannon's most popular compositions, although it is not played regularly in concerts.
