= Office Politics (album) =

Studio album by The Divine Comedy
- Released: 7 June 2019
- Recorded: 2017–2019
- Genre: Art pop
- Length: 60:39
- Label: Divine Comedy
- Producer: Neil Hannon

The Divine Comedy chronology
Foreverland (2016)	Office Politics (2019)	Rainy Sunday Afternoon (2025)

Singles from Office Politics
- 1. "Queuejumper" Released: 3 April 2019; 2. "Norman and Norma" Released: 16 May 2019

Professional ratings
Aggregate scores
Source	Rating
Metacritic	77/100
Review scores
Source	Rating
AllMusic	3.5/5 stars
Clash	7/10
musicOMH	4/5 stars
Paste	7.2/10
The Skinny	2/5 stars

Office Politics is the twelfth studio album by Northern Irish chamber pop band the Divine Comedy, released on 7 June 2019 by Divine Comedy Records. It is a concept album concerning the workplace and the ever-growing role machines play in it. The deluxe edition of the album features a bonus disc of Divine Comedy singer-songwriter Neil Hannon's original piano demos for his songs for Royal National Theatre's 2007 musical adaption of Swallows and Amazons.

Hannon has said that the use of marimba was inspired by bands such as Blondie, on their single "The Tide Is High", and Siouxsie Sioux's second band the Creatures. Hannon also cited the tribal drums of early Adam Ant music as another inspiration. The album's electronic influences were drawn from synth-pop acts that Hannon enjoyed during his youth, such as the Human League and OMD.

Metacritic, which assigns a normalised rating out of 100 to reviews from mainstream critics, awarded the album an average score of 77, based on seven reviews, indicating "generally good reviews."

== Track listing ==
All tracks are written by Neil Hannon, except where otherwise noted

No.	Title	Writer(s)	Length
1.	"Queuejumper"		3:07
2.	"Office Politics"		4:02
3.	"Norman and Norma"		3:36
4.	"Absolutely Obsolete"		4:13
5.	"Infernal Machines"		3:05
6.	"You'll Never Work in This Town Again"	Neil Hannon, Marion Sunshine, Obdulio Morales, Julio Blanco Leonard	4:11
7.	"Psychological Evaluation"		2:40
8.	"The Synthesiser Service Centre Super Summer Sale"	Hannon, Tosh Flood, Ian Watson, Andrew Skeet, Simon Little, Tim Weller	3:51
9.	"The Life and Soul of the Party"		3:28
10.	"A Feather in Your Cap"		4:00
11.	"I'm a Stranger Here"		4:38
12.	"Dark Days Are Here Again"		3:15
13.	"Philip and Steve's Furniture Removal Company"		4:51
14.	"'Opportunity' Knox"		3:43
15.	"After the Lord Mayor's Show"		3:46
16.	"When the Working Day Is Done"		4:13

Swallows and Amazons – The Original Piano Demos bonus disc
No.	Title	Length
1.	"Whistle for a Wind"	6:04
2.	"The Swallow"	6:21
3.	"The Conquering Heroes"	4:24
4.	"Fighting Swallow"	1:16
5.	"The Amazon Pirates"	3:43
6.	"The Parley"	3:49
7.	"Better Drowned Than Duffers"	3:25
8.	"Let's Make the Best of It"	4:01
9.	"Navy Stroke"	3:00
10.	"Like Robinson Crusoe"	3:48
11.	"Titty's Dream"	4:10
12.	"Conquering Heroes, Victory Chorus"	1:55
13.	"The Black Spot"	3:23
14.	"The Parley – Flint's Apology"	3:26
15.	"Swallows and Amazons Forever"	2:57

== Personnel ==
Credits adapted from Office Politics liner notes.

Musicians

- Neil Hannon – vocals, synthesizers (tracks 1–5, 7–10, 13), guitars (tracks 1, 2, 9, 11 and 16), bass guitar (track 1), piano (tracks 1 and 2), electric piano (tracks 5, 9 and 10), percussion (track 1), sampler (tracks 1 and 6), handclaps (tracks 1, 9 and 13), drum machine (track 2), drums (tracks 2 and 7), Mellotron (tracks 2, 4, 5, 7, 9, 11, 12, 14 and 15), mandolin (tracks 4 and 11), glockenspiel (track 4), electric organ (tracks 5, 6, 10 and 13), harmonica (track 6), banjo (track 14)
- Simon Little – bass guitar (tracks 3–7, 9, 11, 12, 14–16) , backing vocals (tracks 1, 9, 12–14), handclaps (tracks 1 and 13), sound effects (track 5), synthesizer (track 8)
- Andrew Skeet – piano (tracks 3, 4, 11–16), backing vocals (tracks 1, 9, 12–14), handclaps (tracks 1, 9 and 13), drums (track 1), electric piano (track 3), whistling (track 6), synthesizer (track 8), sampler (track 13)
- Tim Weller – drums (tracks 1, 3–6, 9, 12, 14–16), handclaps (tracks 1 and 13), percussion (track 5), drum machine (track 8)
- Ian Watson – backing vocals (tracks 1, 9, 12–14), handclaps (tracks 1, 9 and 13), synthesizers (tracks 3 and 8), organ (track 11), electric organ (tracks 12 and 14), accordion (tracks 12, 14 and 15), Mellotron (track 16)
- Tosh Flood – guitars (tracks 2–6, 9, 11, 12, 14 and 15), backing vocals (tracks 1, 3, 9, 12–14), handclaps (tracks 1, 9 and 13), drums (track 1), Mellotron (track 8), synthesizer (track 8), Omnichord (track 12)

Additional musicians

- Ber Quinn – backing vocals (track 1), synthesizer (track 8)
- Jake Jackson – backing vocals (tracks 9 and 14)
- Katie Kissoon – backing vocals (tracks 2, 3, 9, 12 and 15)
- Sonia Jones – backing vocals (tracks 2, 3, 9, 12 and 15)
- Hazel Fernandez – backing vocals (tracks 2, 3, 9, 12 and 15)
- Pete Ruotolo – backing vocals (track 1), guest vocals (track 13)
- Chris Difford – guest vocals (track 4)
- Cathy Davey – guest vocals (track 4)
- Thomas Walsh – guest vocals (track 4), backing vocals (track 5)

Orchestra

- Warren Zielinski, Richard George, Alison Dods, Patrick Kiernan, Tom Pigott-Smith, Natalia Bonner, Lucy Wilkins, Perry Montague-Mason, Gillon Cameron – violin (tracks 1, 11, 13 and 16)
- Bruce White, Emma Owens, Reiad Chibah – viola (tracks 1, 11, 13 and 16)
- Chris Worsey, Caroline Dale, Ian Burdge – cello (tracks 1, 11, 13 and 16)
- Richard Pryce – double bass (tracks 1, 11, 13 and 16)
- David Pyatt, John Ryan – French horn (tracks 4, 11, 15 and 16)
- Mark Templeton, Richard Edwards – trombones (tracks 11, 15 and 16)
- Dan Newell – trumpet (tracks 11, 15 and 16)
- Owen Slade – tuba (tracks 11, 15 and 16)
- Richard Skinner – bassoon (track 11)
- Eliza Marshall – flute (track 11)
- Max Spiers – oboe (track 11)
- Martin Robertson – clarinet (track 11)

Production

- Neil Hannon – production, engineering (tracks 2, 5, 7, 9, 10 and 13)
- Ber Quinn – engineering (tracks 1, 4–8, 11–14, 16), mixing (track 7)
- Guy Massey – engineering (tracks 1–3, 8, 9, 14 and 15), mixing (tracks 1–6, 8–16)
- Jake Jackson – engineering (tracks 1, 11, 13, 15 and 16)
- John Prestage – assistant engineering
- Kevin Callanan – assistant engineering
- Tom Leach – assistant engineering
- Frank Arkwright – mastering

Design

- Ben Meadows – photography
- Raphael Neal – photography
- Matthew Cooper – artwork design

== Charts ==
Chart (2019)	Peak position
Belgian Albums (Ultratop Flanders)	159
Belgian Albums (Ultratop Wallonia)	63
French Albums (SNEP)	42
German Albums (Offizielle Top 100)	51
Irish Albums (IRMA)	9
Scottish Albums (Official Charts)	2
Spanish Albums (PROMUSICAE)	33
Swiss Albums (Schweizer Hitparade)	78
UK Albums (Official Charts)	5
