= Generation Sex =

Single by the Divine Comedy

from the album Fin de Siècle
- B-side: "Postcard to Rosie"; "London Irish"; "Time Lapse"; "Chasing Sheep Is Best Left to Shepherds"; "Little Acts of Kindness"
- Released: 14 September 1998
- Genre: Britpop
- Length: 3:31
- Label: Setanta
- Songwriter(s): Neil Hannon
- Producer(s): Jon Jacobs

The Divine Comedy singles chronology
"I've Been to a Marvellous Party" (1998)	"Generation Sex" (1998)	"The Certainty of Chance" (1998)

Official audio
- "Generation Sex" on YouTube

"Generation Sex" is a song by the Divine Comedy. It was the first single from the album Fin de Siècle and features narration by presenter and columnist Katie Puckrik. It reached number nineteen on the UK Singles Chart.

The B-sides "Time Lapse" and "Chasing Sheep Is Best Left to Shepherds" are cover versions of music written by composer Michael Nyman for Peter Greenaway films. "Time Lapse" comes from A Zed & Two Noughts while "Chasing Sheep..." is from The Draughtsman's Contract.

== Critical reception ==
In an AllMusic review, critic Matthew Greenwald wrote that "Generation Sex" paints "a picture of hedonism in the late 20th century, as well as its affect [sic] on the media." He noted that the song shows "Neil Hannon's black humor" and that overall is "an accurate account of the financially advantaged and over-sexed."

== Track listing ==
7" (SET050)

1. "Generation Sex"
2. "Postcard to Rosie"

CD1 (SETCDA050)

1. "Generation Sex"
2. "London Irish"
3. "Time Lapse"

CD2 (SETCDB050)

1. "Generation Sex"
2. "Chasing Sheep Is Best Left to Shepherds"
3. "Little Acts of Kindness"
