= Rainy Sunday Afternoon =

Studio album by The Divine Comedy
- Released: 19 September 2025
- Studios: Abbey Road (London); Sonic (Dublin)
- Genres: Chamber pop; orchestral pop
- Length: 42:50
- Label: Divine Comedy
- Producer: Neil Hannon

The Divine Comedy chronology
Office Politics (2019)	Rainy Sunday Afternoon (2025)

Singles from Rainy Sunday Afternoon
- 1. "Achilles" Released: 8 April 2025; 2. "The Last Time I Saw The Old Man" Released: 22 July 2025; 3. "Invisible Thread" Released: 2 Sept 2025; 4. "All The Pretty Lights" Released: 17 Nov 2025

Rainy Sunday Afternoon is the thirteenth studio album by Northern Irish pop band The Divine Comedy. It was released on 19 September 2025, via Divine Comedy Records in LP, CD, cassette and digital formats.

The album was preceded by the band's 2019 release, Office Politics, the album was recorded at Studio 3 on Abbey Road. On 8 April 2025, the first single of the album, "Achilles", was released.

== Reception ==
Professional ratings
Review scores
Source	Rating
The Arts Desk	3/5 stars
Clash	9/10
God Is in the TV	8/10
Hot Press	8/10
The Irish Times	4/5 stars
Louder Than War	4/5 stars
Mojo	4/5 stars
MusicOMH	4.5/5 stars
Rolling Stone France	4/5 stars
Rolling Stone Germany	4/5 stars

Louder Than War's Robert Plummer described the album as "a bittersweet collection of songs that, subdued as it often is, has the salutary effect of confirming and strengthening our humanity," giving it a four-star rating. Narc gave it a four-out-of-five rating, noting the "tracks are orchestral, full of lush vocal harmonies, fairground synths and complementary percussion, weaving between the country and western journey of Achilles, to music hall and jazz."

The album received a three-star rating from the Arts Desk, whose reviewer Guy Oddy described it as "literate", "mature" and sounding "like a stocktaking, a deep breath and a meditation on late middle age." BrooklynVegan referred to the project as Neil Hannon's "darkest album since 1998's Fin de Siècle," and "a lushly orchestrated record."

In his review for Clash with a nine-out-of-ten rating, Gareth James noted the album as "one of the Divine Comedy's finest records and it draws from many of the most powerful elements of his musical instincts in support of a welcome emotional wallow." It was given a score of eight by God Is in the TV, whose reviewer Steven Doherty called it "an album to get some things off his chest, and he does so melodically beautifully from start to finish."

Hot Press' Will Russell assigned Rainy Sunday Afternoon a rating of eight, stating "Marvelous stuff altogether, but judging by the record sleeve – which features a svelte and youthful-looking Hannon – such macabre thoughts seem thankfully rather premature." The Irish Examiner called it "one of the most sumptuous-sounding Divine Comedy albums to date." The album was rated four stars by the Irish Times, which remarked, "Despite the somewhat less jocular mood, so high is the quality – as with pretty much everything that Hannon turns his hand to," and Mojo, which described it as "Hannon's most personal and poignant album to date, often feels profound, substantive, built to last."

John Murphy of MusicOMH gave the project a four-and-a-half star rating, calling it "Hannon's most personal album to date" and "an album that's easily Neil Hannon's best in years." The German and French editions of Rolling Stone each rated the album four stars. Writing for the German edition, Ina Simone Mautz praised the arrangements and melodies as "wonderful", and Mathieu David for the French edition called it a "cleverly orchestrated and brilliantly performed record."

== Track listing ==
All tracks are written by Neil Hannon.

Rainy Sunday Afternoon – Standard edition
No.	Title	Length
1.	"Achilles"	4:10
2.	"The Last Time I Saw the Old Man"	4:21
3.	"The Man Who Turned into a Chair"	3:33
4.	"I Want You"	4:45
5.	"Rainy Sunday Afternoon"	3:59
6.	"All the Pretty Lights"	3:40
7.	"Down the Rabbit Hole"	2:48
8.	"Mar-a-Lago by the Sea"	2:53
9.	"The Heart Is a Lonely Hunter"	4:48
10.	"Can't Let Go"	2:33
11.	"Invisible Thread"	5:20
Total length:		42:50

Rainy Sunday Afternoon – Live in Paris & London
No.	Title	Length
12.	"A Desperate Man" (Live in Paris)	2:56
13.	"Neapolitan Girl" (Live in London)	2:56
14.	"Freedom Road" (Live in Paris)	4:05
15.	"Count Grassi's Passage Over Piedmont" (Live in London)	3:35
16.	"Note to Self" (Live in Paris)	5:52
17.	"Wreck of the Beautiful" (Live in Paris)	5:03
18.	"The Lost Art of Conversation" (Live in London)	4:59
19.	"Someone" (Live in Paris)	5:59
20.	"Life on Earth" (Live in Paris)	4:15
21.	"Ten Seconds to Midnight" (Live in London)	2:17
22.	"Middle Class Heroes" (Live in London)	5:22
23.	"In Pursuit of Happiness" (Live in London)	3:44
24.	"Love What You Do" (Live in Paris)	3:52
Total length:		97:45

=== Note ===
- "Achilles" was inspired by "Achilles in the Trench" by Patrick Shaw-Stewart.
- "Live in London" and "Live in Paris" tracks were recorded in September 2022 at the Barbican Centre and the Cité de la Musique, respectively.
- CD2 of the deluxe edition contains "My Lovely Horse" as an unlisted bonus track.

== Personnel ==
Credits adapted from the album's liner notes.

=== The Divine Comedy ===
- Tosh Flood – electric guitar, acoustic guitar, banjo, backing vocals (tracks 1–11); guitars (12–24)
- Neil Hannon – vocals, arrangements (all tracks); production, acoustic guitar, electric guitar, keyboards, percussion, orchestral arrangements, choral arrangements (1–11)
- Simon Little – electric bass, upright bass (all tracks); backing vocals (1–11)
- Andrew Skeet – piano (all tracks); acoustic guitar, keyboards, percussion, backing vocals, orchestral arrangements, choral arrangements, conductor (1–11); arrangements (11–24)
- Ian Watson – accordion, keyboards (all tracks); percussion, backing vocals (1–11)
- Tim Weller – drums (all tracks), percussion (1–11)

=== Additional musicians ===
- Lucy Wilkins – strings and brass (1–11), violin (12–24)
- Chris Worsey – strings and brass (1–11), cello (12–24)
- Tom Rees-Roberts – strings and brass (1–11), flugelhorn solo (2)
- Everton Nelson – strings and brass leader (1–11)
- Nick Barr – strings and brass (1–11)
- Natalia Bonner – strings and brass (1–11)
- Ian Burdge – strings and brass (1–11)
- Gillon Cameron – strings and brass (1–11)
- Reiad Chibah – strings and brass (1–11)
- Barry Clements – strings and brass (1–11)
- Louisa Fuller – strings and brass (1–11)
- Richard George – strings and brass (1–11)
- Marianne Haynes – strings and brass (1–11)
- Jenny Lewisohn – strings and brass (1–11)
- Steve Morris – strings and brass (1–11)
- Daniel Newell – strings and brass (1–11)
- Martin Owen – strings and brass (1–11)
- John Ryan – strings and brass (1–11)
- Ed Tarrant – strings and brass (1–11)
- Andy Wood – strings and brass (1–11)
- Sarah Davey – vocals (1–11)
- Grace Davidson – vocals (1–11)
- Daniel Lewis – vocals (1–11)
- Ben Parry – vocals (1–11)
- Imogen Parry – vocals (1–11)
- Elizabeth Swain – vocals (1–11)
- Ellie Macready – additional vocals (3)
- John Evans – guitars (12–24)
- Calina de la Mare – violin, viola (12–24)
- Sarah Field – trumpet, saxophones (12–24)
- Christian Forshaw – saxophones, flute (12–24)
- Tom Bailey – additional percussion (6)
- Willow Hannon – guest vocals (11)

=== Technical and visuals ===
- Tom Bailey – recording, mixing (1–11)
- George Oulton – recording assistance, mixing assistance (1–11)
- Tom Ashpitel – recording assistance, mixing assistance (1–11)
- Ber Quinn– additional recording (1–11); recording, mixing (12–24)
- Frank Arkwright – mastering
- Matthew Cooper – artwork direction, design
- Kevin Westenberg – photography

== Charts ==
Chart performance for Rainy Sunday Afternoon
Chart (2025)	Peak position
Austrian Albums (Ö3 Austria)	59
Belgian Albums (Ultratop Flanders)	89
Belgian Albums (Ultratop Wallonia)	32
French Albums (SNEP)	29
French Rock & Metal Albums (SNEP)	1
German Albums (Offizielle Top 100)	40
German Pop Albums (Offizielle Top 100)	13
Irish Albums (Official Charts)	41
Scottish Albums (Official Charts)	2
Swedish Physical Albums (Sverigetopplistan)	8
Swiss Albums (Schweizer Hitparade)	38
UK Albums (Official Charts)	4
UK Independent Albums (Official Charts)	1
