= The Lost Art of Conversation =

The Lost Art of Conversation may refer to:

- "The Lost Art of Conversation", a song by the Divine Comedy from Bang Goes the Knighthood
- "The Lost Art of Conversation", a song by Pink Floyd from The Endless River
