= Brian Hannon =

Church of Ireland clergyman (1936–2022)

- Born: 6 October 1936; Ireland
- Died: 10 January 2022 (aged 85)
- Education: Trinity College Dublin
- Movement: Church of Ireland
- Children: Neil Hannon

Brian Desmond Anthony Hannon (5 October 1936 – 10 January 2022) was a Church of Ireland clergyman, who was Bishop of Clogher from 1986 to 2001. He was also the father of the singer and songwriter Neil Hannon, lead member of The Divine Comedy.

Hannon was educated at Trinity College Dublin, and ordained in 1962. His first post was a curacy in Clooney, County Londonderry; after which he was the incumbent at Desertmartin, County Londonderry. He ministered in Derry, County Londonderry, from 1969 to 1982, during the time of The Troubles. He then moved to the Church of Ireland Diocese of Clogher, as rector of the Cathedral Parish of Enniskillen in County Fermanagh, and became Dean of Clogher in 1985. He was raised to the episcopate as Bishop of Clogher in 1986.

He retired on 5 October 2001, his sixty-fifth birthday. Hannon died on 10 January 2022, at the age of 85.
