= Foreverland =

Studio album by The Divine Comedy
- Released: 2 September 2016
- Recorded: 2015–16
- Studio: Various: Master Chord Studios; (London); AIR Studios; (London); National Concert Hall; (Dublin)
- Genre: Orchestral pop
- Length: 41:43; 55:47 (bonus disc)
- Label: Divine Comedy
- Producer: Neil Hannon

The Divine Comedy chronology
Bang Goes the Knighthood (2010)	Foreverland (2016)	Office Politics (2019)

Singles from Foreverland
- 1. "Catherine the Great" Released: 24 June 2016; 2. "How Can You Leave Me on My Own" Released: 26 August 2016; 3. "To The Rescue" Released: 20 January 2017

Professional ratings
Aggregate scores
Source	Rating
Metacritic	75/100
Review scores
Source	Rating
AllMusic	3/5 stars
Drowned in Sound	8/10
Hot Press	positive
The Irish Times	4/5 stars
Mojo	4/5 stars
Q	4/5 stars
Uncut	7/10

Foreverland is the eleventh studio album by Northern Irish chamber pop band the Divine Comedy, released on 2 September 2016 by Divine Comedy Records.

== Accolades ==
Publication	Accolade	Year	Rank
Mojo	The 50 Best Albums of 2016	2016	50

== Track listing ==
All tracks are written by Neil Hannon, except where noted

No.	Title	Length
1.	"Napoleon Complex"	4:45
2.	"Foreverland"	4:01
3.	"Catherine the Great"	3:03
4.	"Funny Peculiar"	2:44
5.	"The Pact"	2:55
6.	"To the Rescue"	5:16
7.	"How Can You Leave Me on My Own"	3:31
8.	"I Joined the Foreign Legion (To Forget)"	3:41
9.	"My Happy Place"	4:10
10.	"A Desperate Man"	2:42
11.	"Other People"	1:35
12.	"The One Who Loves You"	3:20

Deluxe edition bonus disc
No.	Title	Length
1.	"6 December"	3:52
2.	"11 December"	4:16
3.	"13 December"	2:37
4.	"23 December"	2:59
5.	"3 January"	4:11
6.	"13 January"	1:41
7.	"15 January"	1:58
8.	"30 January"	3:33
9.	"7 February"	2:13
10.	"22 February"	3:49
11.	"8 March"	3:10
12.	"27 March"	1:07
13.	"4 April"	3:33
14.	"4 April (Midnight)"	2:34
15.	"3 May"	4:16
16.	"10 May"	2:17
17.	"21 May"	3:12
18.	"28 May"	1:07
19.	"31 May"	3:22

== Personnel ==
Personnel per liner notes included in Venus, Folly, Cupid & Time – Thirty Years of the Divine Comedy.

Musicians

- Neil Hannon – vocals, guitars, keyboards, piano, mandolin, banjo, zither, harmonica; bass and drums (tracks 1 and 7)
- Andrew Skeet – piano
- Simon Little – bass guitar
- Tim Weller – drums
- Ian Watson – accordion
- Rob Farrer – percussion
- Celine Saout – harp
- Karen Glen – harpsichord (track 6)
- Jake Jackson – backing vocals, claps and whistle solo (track 4)
- David Jackson – penny whistle (track 2)
- Cathy Davey – vocals (tracks 1 and 4)
- Billy Cooper – piccolo trumpet (track 6)
- Rosie Jenkins – oboe (track 7)

Production

- Jake Jackson – mixing
- Michele G. Catri – mixing
- Fiona Cruickshank – mixing
- John Prestage – mixing
- Luna Picoli-Truffaut – artwork co-star
- Raphaël Neal – photography
- Matthew Cooper – artwork and design
- John Service – packaging production
- Natalie de Pace – executive producer and management

Orchestra

- Andrew Skeet – conductor, additional orchestration
- Nathan Klein – additional orchestration
- Isobel Griffiths – orchestra contractor
- Lucy Whalley – orchestra contractor
- Adrian Smith, Alison Dods, Bruce White, Chris Worsey, Emma Owens, Everton Nelson, Frank Schaefer, Gillon Cameron, Ian Burdge, Ian Humphries, Lucy Wilkins, Matt Ward, Patrick Kiernan, Pete Hanson, Reiad Chibah, Richard George, Richard Bryce, Rick Koster, Simon Baggs, Steve Morris, Tom Pigott-Smith, Warren Zielinski – string section
- Billy Cooper, John Ryan, Mark Templeton, Matt Gunner, Richard Edwards, Richard Watkins, Sebastian Philpott, Trevor Mires – brass section
- Eliza Marshall, Martin Robertson, Richard Skinner, Rosie Jenkins – woodwind section

== Charts ==
Chart (2016)	Peak position
Austrian Albums (Ö3 Austria)	65
Belgian Albums (Ultratop Flanders)	31
Belgian Albums (Ultratop Wallonia)	12
French Albums (SNEP)	18
German Albums (Offizielle Top 100)	41
Irish Albums (IRMA)	3
Portuguese Albums (AFP)	21
Scottish Albums (OCC)	9
Spanish Albums (PROMUSICAE)	33
Swiss Albums (Schweizer Hitparade)	36
UK Albums (OCC)	7
