= Diva Lady =

Single by The Divine Comedy

from the album Victory for the Comic Muse
- Released: 12 June 2006
- Recorded: 2005
- Genre: Orchestral pop
- Length: 4:17 (album version)
- Label: Parlophone
- Songwriter: Neil Hannon
- Producer: Neil Hannon

The Divine Comedy singles chronology
"Absent Friends" (2004)	"Diva Lady" (2006)	"To Die a Virgin" (2006)

"Diva Lady" is a song by the Divine Comedy from their 2006 album Victory for the Comic Muse. It was released on 12 June 2006 as the lead single from that album, peaking at No. 52 on the UK Singles Chart.

== Track listings ==
7" R6698

1. "Diva Lady"
2. "Elaine"

CD single CDR6698

1. "Diva Lady"
2. "Don't Blame the Young"

Maxi-CD CDRS6698

1. "Diva Lady"
2. "Premonition of Love"
3. "Births, Deaths and Marriages"
4. "Diva Lady" (video)

== Charts ==
Chart performance for Diva Lady
Chart (1998)	Peak position
UK Singles (OCC)	52
Scotland Singles (OCC)	37
Ireland (IRMA)	36
