= To Die a Virgin =

Single by The Divine Comedy

from the album Victory for the Comic Muse
- Released: 14 August 2006
- Recorded: 2005
- Genre: Orchestral pop
- Length: 3:39 (album version)
- Label: Parlophone
- Songwriter: Neil Hannon
- Producer: Neil Hannon

The Divine Comedy singles chronology
| "Diva Lady" (2006) | "To Die a Virgin" (2006) | "A Lady of a Certain Age" (2006) |

"To Die a Virgin" is a song by the Divine Comedy and is the opening track to their 2006 album Victory for the Comic Muse. It was released on 14 August 2006 as the second single from that album. The sample at the beginning of the song is of Jennifer Ehle and Toby Stephens in the 1992 TV series The Camomile Lawn.

== Track listings ==
7" R6712

1. "To Die a Virgin"
2. "Long Slow Suicide"

CD single CDR6712

1. "To Die a Virgin"
2. "Pamplemousse"

Maxi-CD CDRS6712

1. "To Die a Virgin"
2. "Absolute Power"
3. "Our Mutual Friend" (home demo)

== Charts ==
Chart performance for To Die a Virgin
| Chart (2006) | Peak position |
|---|---|
| UK Singles (OCC) | 67 |
| Scotland Singles (OCC) | 45 |
