= Bad Ambassador =

Single by The Divine Comedy

from the album Regeneration
- A-side: "Bad Ambassador", "Bad Ambassador (Live)"
- B-side: "Edward the Confessor", "U.S.E.", "Pictures of Matchstick Men (Live)", "Sweden (Live)", "Life on Earth (Live)"
- Released: 2001
- Genre: Britpop
- Length: 3:46
- Label: Parlophone/EMI
- Songwriter(s): Neil Hannon
- Producer(s): Nigel Godrich

The Divine Comedy singles chronology
"Love What You Do" (2001)	"Bad Ambassador" (2001)	"Perfect Lovesong" (2001)

"Bad Ambassador" is a song by the Divine Comedy. It was released as the second single from the album Regeneration. A live version of the track serves as the A-side on the second CD single.

CD-ROM content on the first disc includes the promotional video. Filmed in black and white, it features a Bigfoot working in a paper factory and dreaming of a better life with a co-worker.

The four live tracks from the second CD and 7" were recorded at Oxford Brookes University on 21 March 2001. "Pictures of Matchstick Men" is a cover version of the Status Quo song from 1968.

== Track listing ==
7" (R 6558)
No.	Title	Length
1.	"Bad Ambassador"
2.	"Life on Earth" (Live)

CD1 (CDRS6558)
No.	Title	Length
1.	"Bad Ambassador"
2.	"Edward the Confessor"
3.	"U.S.E."

CD2 (CDR 6558)
No.	Title	Length
1.	"Bad Ambassador" (Live)
2.	"Pictures of Matchstick Men" (Live)
3.	"Sweden" (Live)

CD promo (CDR-DJ-6558)
No.	Title	Length
1.	"Bad Ambassador"

CD promo (France) (SA6368)
No.	Title	Length
1.	"Bad Ambassador"
