= Here Comes the Flood =

Here Comes the Flood may refer to:

- "Here Comes the Flood", an episode of Grey's Anatomy (season 5)
- "Here Comes the Flood", a song by Peter Gabriel on the album Peter Gabriel (1977 album)
  - a different version of the same song on the album Exposure (Robert Fripp album)
- "Here Comes the Flood", a song by the Divine Comedy on the album Fin de Siècle
- Here Comes the Flood (film), an American heist film directed by Fernando Meirelles
