= Ball of the Century =

1993 cricket delivery bowled by Shane Warne

The Ball of the Century, also referred to as the Gatting Ball or simply That Ball, is a cricket delivery bowled by Australian spin bowler Shane Warne to English batter Mike Gatting on 4 June 1993, the second day of the first Test of the 1993 Ashes series, at Old Trafford in Manchester. With his first ball against England, in his first Ashes Test, Warne produced a spectacular delivery that bowled Gatting out. It became recognised as being of significance not just in the context of the match, but more generally in signalling a revival of leg spin bowling.

== Background ==
The pitch at Old Trafford traditionally favours spin bowling, and England picked two spin bowlers: Phil Tufnell and debutant Peter Such. In contrast, Australia picked three fast bowlers, with the inexperienced Warne as the only spinner. Warne had played in 11 Test matches up to that point, and taken 31 wickets at a moderate average of 30.80 runs per wicket. Although showing some promise, Warne's early career had been less than spectacular, and his style of bowling—leg spin—was seen by many cricket followers as an antiquated art with little value in the modern game. Fast Bowling had dominated the game since the legendary West Indian pace bowlers of the 1950s through to the 1980s. New Zealand's captain and leading batsman, Martin Crowe, had praised Warne before the series, but Wisden notes that Crowe's proclamation was widely dismissed as excusing New Zealand's frailties rather than genuinely endorsing Warne.

English captain Graham Gooch won the toss and elected to bowl first, hoping to use the pitch conditions to make batting difficult for the Australians. Despite Mark Taylor scoring a century, Australia was dismissed for a moderate total of 289 runs. England also began well, reaching 71 runs before Mike Atherton was dismissed by Merv Hughes. Opposite Gooch, Mike Gatting was the next man to bat and he duly set about scoring runs. At this point, Australian captain Allan Border turned to his leg spinner, Shane Warne. However, Gatting was renowned as a world-class player against spin bowling and was fully expected to give the inexperienced Warne a tough time.

== Delivery ==
A leg spin delivery to a right-handed batter

After a slow run-up of just a few paces, Warne rolled his right arm over and delivered a leg break to the right-handed Gatting. The ball initially travelled straight down the pitch toward the batsman. As is apparent from slow-motion replays, the rapidly spinning cricket ball began to drift to the right (due to the Magnus effect). The ball ended up pitching several inches outside the line of Gatting's leg stump.

Gatting responded by thrusting his left leg forward towards the pitch of the ball, and pushing his bat next to his pad, angled downwards. This was a standard defensive tactic used by most experienced batsmen against leg-spin balls that were pitched outside the leg stump. The intention is for the ball to hit either the pad or the bat without danger of being out. Because the ball is pitched outside the leg stump, the batsman cannot be out leg before wicket, and if the ball spun slightly more than expected, it would hit the bat and rebound safely down to the ground so the batsman cannot be caught.

However, the ball landed in a patch of the pitch which had been worn by the follow-through of pace bowlers earlier in the game (footmarks). This increased the friction between the ball and the surface, causing it to turn far more than Gatting (or anyone else) expected. The ball passed the outside edge of his bat, then clipped the top of his off stump, dislodging the bails. Gatting stared at the pitch for several seconds, before accepting that he was out bowled and walked off the field. The dismissal was captured in a photograph by Steve Lindsell, in which Gatting is in shock, while wicketkeeper Ian Healy raises his arms in celebration behind and Gatting's off bail spins somewhere above his head.

== Aftermath ==
The fall of Gatting's wicket left England on 80 runs for 2 wickets, a position from which they never recovered, as Warne added the wicket of Robin Smith a mere four runs later. Warne also accounted for Gooch and Andy Caddick in the innings, helping reduce England to a first-innings total of just 210. Encouraged by their bowling, Australia declared their second innings at 432 for 5 wickets. Warne then contributed four more wickets as Australia won the match by 179 runs, winning the man of the match award for his efforts.

The result of this match set the tone for the remainder of the series, and Australia cruised to a comfortable 4–1 victory, with Warne taking a total of 34 wickets at an average of 25.79 and being named the Australian man of the series (each team being awarded a separate Man of the Series award by the other in that series).

== Legacy ==
This series was another step in the early stages of Australia's long domination of world cricket, coinciding with Warne's exceedingly successful career. Warne's bowling also provided an eye-opening insight into the subtleties and power of leg spin bowling for modern cricket audiences, who had become used to the spectacle of pace attacks, and marked a worldwide resurgence of popularity in the art of spin bowling in general, and leg spin in particular.

Warne's delivery to Gatting has become known as the Ball of the Century. Since that incident, Warne has come to be acknowledged as one of the best bowlers in history. During the penultimate Test match of his career on Boxing Day 2006, in the fourth Ashes Test against England, Warne took his 700th Test wicket, bowling Andrew Strauss to become the first cricketer ever to reach this milestone.

Graham Gooch commented on the reaction of Gatting, "He looked as though someone had just nicked his lunch", as Gatting was much mocked for his rotundity. This was further alluded to by journalist Martin Johnson, who said, "How anyone can spin a ball the width of Gatting boggles the mind", and again by Gooch who added, "If it had been a cheese roll, it would never have got past him." It was said that Gatting visited Warne in the Australian Dressing Rooms at Old Trafford and asked: "Bloody hell, Warnie, what happened?" to which Warne replied, "Sorry, mate; just got lucky". Gatting later remarked that he was happy to be part of a great moment in cricket history. Gooch was equally bemused: "That delivery would've got anyone out; it was the perfect length and speed. The perfect ball."

During the Old Trafford Test of the 2005 Ashes series, the long-retired Gatting re-created the Ball of the Century with an automated bowling machine programmed to deliver leg spin.

The delivery was the subject of the song "Jiggery Pokery" on The Duckworth Lewis Method's eponymous cricket-themed album.

During the ICC Cricket World Cup, India unorthodox bowler Kuldeep Yadav's dismissal of Pakistan's Babar Azam in 2019 and of England's Jos Buttler in 2023 drew comparisons to Warne's ball, with James Gheerbrant of The Times calling the delivery "[Kuldeep's] own 'ball of the century'.". Similarly in 2018, England legspinner Adil Rashid bowled Virat Kohli (in the final ODI at Headingley) and KL Rahul (in the final Test at The Oval) with the Ball of the Century. In the final ODI of the 2021 Pakistan Tour of England, Matt Parkinson bowled Imam-ul-Haq, placing the ball in the rough, and generating a large amount of turn. The ball was stated to be the 'biggest spinning ball in the history of ODI cricket', as the ball spun 12.1 degrees.

In the second Women's Twenty20 match of the Indian women's tour of Australia 2021, Shikha Pandey bowled a ball that has been described as 'Ball of the Century', to get rid of Alyssa Healy.
