= Brushback pitch =

Type of baseball pitch

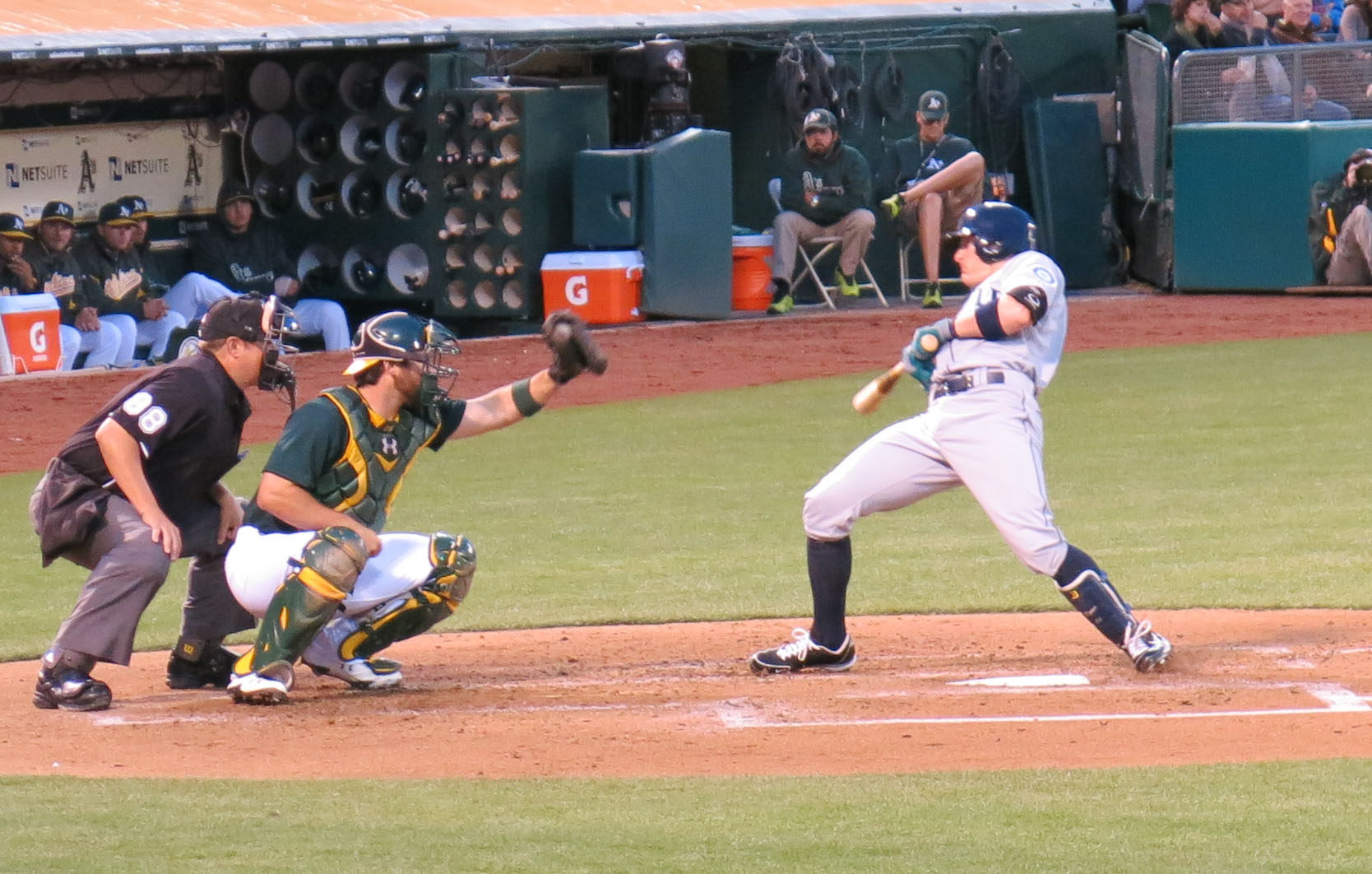
Seattle Mariners shortstop Brendan Ryan bends away from a brushback pitch from Oakland Athletics pitcher Tommy Milone.

In baseball, a brushback pitch is a pitch (typically a fastball) thrown high and inside the strike zone to intimidate the batter away from the plate on subsequent pitches. It differs from the beanball in that the intent is not to hit the batter, nor does it target the batter's head. Hitters will often crowd the plate in order to have a better swing at pitches on the outside half of the plate. The hitters hope that the pitcher will be scared to throw inside because they might hit the batter. The brushback helps a pitcher to "reclaim" the corners of the strike zone by forcing the batter to stand further away.

Play-by-play announcers sometimes call a high brushback pitch as being "high and tight". It is also referred to as chin music.

While the brushback can be an effective part of pitching, the home-plate umpire may warn or eject a pitcher if they feel the pitch was intentionally trying to hit the batter.
