= Daniel Edelstyn =

British filmmaker

- Born: Daniel Edelstyn; Northern Ireland
- Occupations: Documentary film director, producer and screenwriter; actor
- Website: www.optimisticproductions.co.uk

Daniel Edelstyn (born 1976) is an English documentary filmmaker, screenwriter and singer with The Orchestra of Cardboard.

== Early life ==
Edelstyn, who was three when his father (the oncologist Dr. George Edelstyn 1930–1979) died, grew up in Northern Ireland. Edelstyn was educated at Rockport School in Northern Ireland until 1989, then attended Gordonstoun School Scotland until 1995 – after which he attended UCL and Sorbonne Paris IV, graduating in 1999. Edelstyn moved to NYC in 1999 where he attended New York Film Academy before returning to London in 2000, where he continues to work.

== Career ==
He realized his first documentary films How to Re-establish a Vodka Empire in 2006–2011, in which he found his dead grandmother's memoir and decided to retrace her life. The film was completed in November 2011 in time for the BFI London Film Festival and had a UK cinema release in March 2012, receiving 4 star reviews in The Times, The Irish Times and Empire magazine. It had a US theatrical release in 2012.

== Filmography ==
=== Film ===
- How to Re-Establish a Vodka Empire (2012)
- The Debtonator (2017)
- Bank Job, with Hilary Powell (2021)
- Power Station (2025)

=== Television ===
- WTF Is Cosplay with Kell Mitchell, Channel 4
- Subverting The City (2005) for Channel 4
- Random Acts (2013) for Channel 4
- Comedy of Errors: Shakespeare documentary, with Emily Renshaw-Smith (2015)
