= National Express (song) =

1999 single by the Divine Comedy

Single by the Divine Comedy

from the album Fin de Siècle
- B-side: "Going Downhill Fast"; "Radioactivity"; "Famous"; "Overstrand"
- Released: 25 January 1999
- Length: 5:05 (album version); 3:37 (radio edit/video version)
- Label: Setanta
- Songwriter: Neil Hannon
- Producer: Jon Jacobs

The Divine Comedy singles chronology
"The Certainty of Chance" (1998)	"National Express" (1999)	"The Pop Singer's Fear of the Pollen Count" (1999)

Music video
- "National Express" on YouTube

"National Express" is a song by Northern Irish band the Divine Comedy. On 25 January 1999, it was released as the third single from their sixth album, Fin de Siècle (1998), and reached number eight on the UK Singles Chart and number 18 in Ireland. The song is based on Neil Hannon's observations of life from the window of a National Express coach.

Though some listeners have taken the lyrics of "National Express" to be an advertisement for the eponymous British coach company, Neil Hannon has denied that they are. Musically, the song is mainly notated in the key of G major, with its verse containing an alternation of chording from D_{6} to C major_{7}.

== Music video ==
The official video for the song, directed by Matthew Kirkby, examines with some irony the UK National Health Service from the viewpoint of a mental health patient (portrayed by Hannon) in a psychiatric hospital filmed at the (now-demolished) Joyce Green Hospital in Dartford, Kent. The video begins with a doctor and a woman (the patient's wife), with faces hidden and only their hands shown, talking about the patient's problems. As the music starts, it then cuts to Hannon as the patient, being pushed in a wheelchair by a porter to the wards and then taking his medication; the patient gets out of his hospital bed and starts dancing around. The porter is not pleased by this and immediately returns the patient back to the wheelchair and takes him for electroconvulsive therapy.

On the way the patient starts to behave erratically and the porter unsuccessfully tries to control him, until they finally reach the E.C.T. unit, where the patient is given treatment behind closed doors. The video ends with the patient shown unconscious from his treatment with the porter pushing him back to the ward in the wheelchair. The patient eventually starts to wake up, with two shots of his feet dancing, before the final shot of the patient smiling fades to a long stretch of open road.

== Reception ==
The music press took aim at Hannon for "sneering" at the working classes on the track. Steven Wells of NME wrote: "What a filthy, disgusting, revolting, nauseating little record ... This is mock-pop. This is the work of an 'artist' who thinks himself superior to his art form and despises his audience." Hannon responded: "'National Express' ... is pure observation, nothing made up – I'm on this bus, this is what I see. 'The family man/manhandling the pram/with paternal pride' is me having a dig at my brother for having a kid and being Nineties Man, you know, and he's not exactly working class."

In a retrospective AllMusic review, critic Tim DiGravina said that the song has a "baroque, grandiose styling" and "might not be a fan favorite, but it helps to solidify Neil Hannon's status as a musical renaissance man."

== Appearances ==
"National Express" is used as the soundtrack for Scottish trials cyclist Danny MacAskill's 2016 short film Wee Day Out.

The music of "National Express" was used by candidate Count Binface in a video for the August 13, 2026 Clacton by-election in the United Kingdom. This musical parody was retitled Clacton Express and the credits list music by Neil Hannon and lyrics by Count Binface.

== Track listing ==
All tracks written by Neil Hannon, except where indicated.

CD1 (SETCDA069)

1. "National Express" (radio edit)
2. "Going Downhill Fast"
3. "Radioactivity" (Ralf Hütter, Florian Schneider, Emil Schult) (Kraftwerk cover version)

CD2 (SETCDB069)

1. "National Express" (full album version)
2. "Famous" (Stephin Merritt) (The Magnetic Fields cover version)
3. "Overstrand"

Cassette (SETMC069)

1. "National Express" (full album version)
2. "The Heart of Rock and Roll"

== Charts ==
=== Weekly charts ===
Chart (1999)	Peak position
Ireland (IRMA)	18
Scottish Singles Sales (Official Charts)	7
UK Singles (Official Charts)	8
UK Indie (Official Charts)	2

=== Year-end charts ===
Chart (1999)	Position
UK Singles (OCC)	174

== Certifications ==
Region	Certification	Certified units/sales
United Kingdom (BPI)	Silver	200,000^{‡}
^{‡} Sales+streaming figures based on certification alone.
