= Regeneration (The Divine Comedy album) =

Studio album by The Divine Comedy
- Released: 12 March 2001
- Recorded: 2000
- Studio: RAK Studio
- Genre: Alternative rock
- Length: 49:53
- Label: Parlophone
- Producer: Nigel Godrich

The Divine Comedy chronology
A Secret History... The Best of the Divine Comedy (1999)	Regeneration (2001)	Absent Friends (2004)

Singles from Regeneration
- 1. "Love What You Do" Released: 26 February 2001; 2. "Bad Ambassador" Released: 14 May 2001; 3. "Perfect Lovesong" Released: 29 October 2001

Professional ratings
Review scores
Source	Rating
AllMusic	4.5/5 stars
Blender	3/5 stars
musicOMH	(positive)
Pitchfork Media	(7.9/10)

Regeneration is the seventh studio album by Northern Irish chamber pop band the Divine Comedy, released in 2001 by Parlophone/EMI (their first for the label). Three singles were released from the album: "Love What You Do", "Bad Ambassador" and "Perfect Lovesong", the latter failing to make the top 40.

== Production ==
Produced by Nigel Godrich, known for his work with Radiohead, this album is distinctly different from frontman Neil Hannon's other work and was darker in tone than what the Divine Comedy's listeners had come to expect. It eschewed the orchestral-driven chamber pop the band was known for in favor of a more stripped down, guitar-focused style, slightly reminiscent of the band's debut album Fanfare for the Comic Muse. It is a more group-concentrated effort, hence the more organic sound.

== Track listing ==
All tracks are written by Neil Hannon.

No.	Title	Length
1.	"Timestretched"	2:48
2.	"Bad Ambassador"	3:45
3.	"Perfect Lovesong"	3:10
4.	"Note to Self"	5:59
5.	"Lost Property"	4:39
6.	"Eye of the Needle"	5:33
7.	"Love What You Do"	3:52
8.	"Dumb It Down"	3:56
9.	"Mastermind"	5:21
10.	"Regeneration"	5:33
11.	"The Beauty Regime"	5:11

== Personnel ==
Personnel adapted from liner notes included in Venus, Cupid, Folly & Time - Thirty Years of the Divine Comedy.

Musicians

- Neil Hannon - vocals, guitar, additional keyboards
- Miggy Barradas - drums, percussion
- Stuart 'Pinkie' Bates - organ, synthesizer, recorder
- Rob Farrer - percussion, additional drums
- Bryan Mills - bass, additional guitar
- Ivor Talbot - guitar, additional bass
- Joby Talbot - piano, synthesizer, recorder, string arrangements
- Philip Sheppard - cello (track 3)
- Millennia Strings - strings (tracks 2, 5, 9 and 11)
- London TeleFilmonic Orchestra - various (track 4)

Production

- Nigel Godrich - producer
- Dan Grech-Marguerat - recording assistant
- Gerard Navarro - mixing assistant
- Claire Burbridge - art direction and sculptures
- Harry Borden - photography

Duncan Smith - additional photography (cover art)
