= Punishing Kiss =

Studio album by Ute Lemper
- Released: 27 March 2000
- Recorded: The Town House, London & Right Track Studios, New York, 1999; Stanley House, Westside, The Town House & Sarm West Studios, London, 1999; Sorcerer Sound, New York, 1999
- Genre: classical; pop; chanson; avant-pop
- Length: 57:10
- Label: Decca
- Producer: Jon Jacobs; Scott Walker; Hal Willner

Professional ratings
Review scores
| Source | Rating |
|---|---|
| Music OMH | (Positive) |

Punishing Kiss is a studio album by German singer Ute Lemper, released in 2000 by Decca Records. It is the product of a collaboration between Lemper and the Divine Comedy and includes songs by the latter artist, as well as Nick Cave, Elvis Costello, Philip Glass, Tom Waits, Scott Walker and Ute Lemper's signature artist, Kurt Weill.

Most of the songs feature the Divine Comedy as Lemper's backing band. Neil Hannon and Joby Talbot also contributed two original songs and an arrangement of Brecht and Weill's "Tango Ballad", while Hannon sang two songs ("Tango Ballad", "Split") as duets with Lemper.

The French version of the album includes a bonus CD with three songs in French. Arthur H sings with Lemper on "Maison Close", the translation of "Tango Ballad". The Japanese version of the album includes an additional track: "Lullaby", written by Scott Walker.

== Legacy ==
The album was included in the book 1001 Albums You Must Hear Before You Die.

== Track listing ==
| No. | Title | Writer(s) | Length |
|---|---|---|---|
| 1. | "Little Water Song" | Bruno Pisek, Nick Cave | 3:59 |
| 2. | "The Case Continues" | Neil Hannon, Joby Talbot | 3:52 |
| 3. | "Passionate Fight" | Elvis Costello, Steve Nieve | 4:14 |
| 4. | "Tango Ballad" | Bertolt Brecht, Kurt Weill | 4:59 |
| 5. | "Couldn't You Keep That to Yourself" | Costello | 2:50 |
| 6. | "Streets of Berlin" | Martin Sherman, Philip Glass | 4:01 |
| 7. | "The Part You Throw Away" | Tom Waits, Kathleen Brennan | 4:40 |
| 8. | "Split" | Hannon, Talbot | 3:43 |
| 9. | "Punishing Kiss" | Costello, Cait O'Riordan | 4:33 |
| 10. | "Purple Avenue" | Waits | 4:23 |
| 11. | "You Were Meant For Me" | Hannon, Talbot | 5:17 |
| 12. | "Scope J" | Scott Walker | 10:56 |

Japanese edition bonus track
| No. | Title | Writer(s) | Length |
|---|---|---|---|
| 13. | "Lullaby (By-By-By)" | Walker | 11:06 |

Bonus French Language CD
| No. | Title | Writer(s) | Length |
|---|---|---|---|
| 1. | "Maison Close" (Version of "Tango Ballad") | Brecht, Weill | 5:14 |
| 2. | "L'Affaire Continue" (Version of "The Case Continues") | Hannon, Talbot | 3:53 |
| 3. | "Petite Chanson d'Eau" (Version of "Little Water Song") | Pisek, Cave | 3:57 |

== Chart positions ==
| Chart (2000) | Peak position |
|---|---|
| U.K. Albums Chart | 104 |
