= Lucy Wilkins =

English violinist and keyboardist

Lucy Wilkins is an English violinist and keyboardist from Nottingham, England. She has toured with Roxy Music and performed with James Blunt and Snow Patrol. She has received critical acclaim for her violin solos while touring with Roxy Music. According to a concert review of the band in The New York Times, "Wilkins succeeded in the difficult role of synthesizer wizard, originally held by the legendary Brian Eno." Wilkins has performed in concerts with the influential EMS VCS 3 synthesizer, as used by Eno and others. A longtime collaborator with Tindersticks, she has performed on many of their recordings, including their film soundtracks for the French director, Claire Dénis. She also works as the orchestral leader for their live concerts with orchestra. Another significant musical relationship has been with Neil Hannon and his band The Divine Comedy, both on recordings and many live tours including the 10 album residencies at The Barbican and Cité de la Musique in 2022.
