= Absent Friends (album) =

Studio album by The Divine Comedy
- Released: 29 March 2004 (UK & Europe); 4 May 2004 (US)
- Recorded: 2001–03
- Studios: RAK, St John's Wood, London and Konk, London
- Genres: Chamber pop, alternative rock
- Length: 45:56
- Labels: Parlophone (UK & Europe); Nettwerk (US)
- Producer: Neil Hannon

The Divine Comedy chronology
Regeneration (2001)	Absent Friends (2004)	Victory for the Comic Muse (2006)

Singles from Absent Friends
- 1. "Come Home Billy Bird" Released: 22 March 2004; 2. "Absent Friends" Released: 14 June 2004

Music video
- The Divine Comedy - Absent Friends on YouTube

Professional ratings
Review scores
Source	Rating
AllMusic	4.5/5 stars
BBC	favourable
Blender	3/5 stars
The Guardian	4/5 stars
Mojo	4/5 stars
musicOMH	favourable
Pitchfork	(7.8/10)
PopMatters	favourable
Q	3.5/5 stars

Absent Friends is the eighth studio album by Northern Irish chamber pop band the Divine Comedy, released in 2004 by Parlophone in the UK and Nettwerk in the U.S. Two singles were released from the album in the UK: "Come Home Billy Bird", which features former Kenickie vocalist Lauren Laverne on vocals, and the album's title track.

Neil Hannon was the only member of the Divine Comedy by this point, as the band had split up shortly after the release of 2001's Regeneration. Hannon had decided to continue using the Divine Comedy name for this album and was aided by long-time collaborator Joby Talbot, who arranged and conducted the orchestra.

The album was recorded at RAK Studios and Konk Studios in London by Guy Massey, with help from Raj Das and Chris Bolster. It was mixed at Mayfair Studios by Nigel Godrich, who was assisted by Dan Grech-Marguerat.

== Reception ==
Reviewing the album for Pitchfork, Joe Tangari said:

Even if you're resistant to Hannon's grandiosity, it's hard to deny the lush sweep of the album's opening title track, a song that confirms his place as the closest thing to an inheritor of Scott Walker's mantle as we're likely to get. The orchestration is expert and economical, and Nigel Godrich, bumped from the producer's chair to the mixing board this time around, perfectly stacks the song's elements to make them sound absolutely huge. Hannon's tenor is commanding, and he spins an incredible melody as he runs through a series of tributes to 20th century icons whose lives ended prematurely, from French actress Jean Seberg to Laika, the first dog in space.

== Track listing ==
All songs written by Neil Hannon.

No.	Title	Length
1.	"Absent Friends"	3:40
2.	"Sticks & Stones"	4:48
3.	"Leaving Today"	4:18
4.	"Come Home Billy Bird"	4:07
5.	"My Imaginary Friend"	2:43
6.	"The Wreck of the Beautiful"	4:58
7.	"Our Mutual Friend"	5:58
8.	"The Happy Goth"	3:36
9.	"Freedom Road"	3:55
10.	"Laika's Theme" (instrumental)	3:07
11.	"Charmed Life"	4:41
Total length:		45:56

== Personnel ==
=== Millennia Ensemble Musicians ===
Orchestra arranged and conducted by Joby Talbot.

- Everton Nelson, Charles Mutter, Warren Zielinski, Cath Haggo, Natalia Bonner, Giles Broadbent, Rick Koster, Matthew Scrivener, Alison Dods, Darragh Morgan, Richard George, Lucy Wilkins, Steve Hussey, Timothy Myall, Helena Wood, John Smart, Maya Bickel, Jenny Sacha - Violin
- Vince Greene, Adrian Smith, Louise Hogan, Reiad Chibah, Dan Cornford - Viola
- Chris Worsey, Ian Burdge, Nick Holland, Christopher Fish - Cello
- Lucy Shaw, Bev Jones - Double Bass
- Daniel Newell, Tom Rees-Roberts - Trumpet
- James 'Spaddy' Adams, Mike Kearsey - Trombone
- Matt Gunner, Simon Morgan - French Horn
- Nick Cartledge - Flute
- Chris Richards - Clarinet
- Dominic Kelly - Oboe
- Jo Cackett, Gareth Newman - Bassoon
- Jay Craig - Saxophone
- Lucy Wakeford - Harp

=== Additional musicians ===
- Miggy Barradas – drums on tracks 2, 4, 8 & 11
- Rob Farrer – percussion on tracks 1, 3, 4, 6, 7 & 8
- Simon Little – double bass on track 8
- Crispin Robinson – congas on tracks 4 & 8
- Joby Talbot – plucked piano on track 9
- Matt Gunner – horn solo on track 9
- Everton Nelson – violin solo on track 10
- Nick Cartledge – flute solo on track 8

=== Technical personnel ===
- Neil Hannon – performer, producer, arranger
- Guy Massey – recording
- Nigel Godrich – mixing
- Dan Marguerat – additional mixing

== Guest performers ==
- Lauren Laverne – vocals on "Come Home Billy Bird"
- Yann Tiersen – accordion on "Sticks & Stones"
