= How to Re-Establish a Vodka Empire =

How to Re-Establish a vodka empire
- Directed by: Daniel Edelstyn
- Written by: Daniel Edelstyn
- Produced by: Daniel Edelstyn; Danielle Di Giacomo; Christopher Hird; Sandra Leeming; Jasleen Sethi; Anna Teeman; Rachel Wexler
- Starring: Daniel Edelstyn; Conrad Asquith; Daniel Jordan; Anthony Styles; Hilary Powell
- Release date: 2012
- Running time: 74 minutes
- Country: England
- Language: English

How to Re-Establish a Vodka Empire is a 2012 documentary film by London filmmaker, actor and director Daniel Edelstyn. It was pitched at the 2009 MeetMarket as part of Sheffield Doc/Fest.

== Reception ==
On Rotten Tomatoes, the film holds an 86% score based on 14 reviews.
