= Victory for the Comic Muse =

Studio album by The Divine Comedy
- Released: 19 June 2006
- Recorded: December 2005
- Genre: Orchestral pop
- Length: 44:34
- Label: Parlophone
- Producer: Neil Hannon

The Divine Comedy chronology
Absent Friends (2004)	Victory for the Comic Muse (2006)	Bang Goes the Knighthood (2010)

Singles from Victory for the Comic Muse
- 1. "Diva Lady" Released: 12 June 2006; 2. "To Die a Virgin" Released: 14 August 2006; 3. "A Lady of a Certain Age" Released: November 2006

CD+DVD version cover

Professional ratings
Review scores
Source	Rating
AllMusic	3.5/5 stars
The Guardian	4/5 stars
musicOMH	4/5 stars
Pitchfork	(7.5/10)
Scotland on Sunday	(positive)

Victory for the Comic Muse is the ninth studio album by Northern Irish chamber pop band the Divine Comedy, released in 2006 by EMI.

The title derives from the E.M. Forster book A Room with a View ("I have won a great victory for the comic muse"), as was the band's debut album Fanfare for the Comic Muse.

== Recording ==
The album is unique in the Divine Comedy catalogue—and in the catalogue of most recent popular music—in that Hannon's original aim was to record the album entirely in two weeks, with the minimum of overdubbing. As such, almost all of the music on the album—much to the chagrin of the classical players involved on nearly every track, and the Divine Comedy band itself—was recorded in live takes. At first, they attempted to use no click tracks or headphones, but this approach was eventually abandoned. The band would record their part, the orchestra would overdub theirs, and then Hannon would record his vocals. No further overdubbing took place unless absolutely necessary, in a fairly hurried style of recording, and in stark contrast to the modern recording technique of stacking up tracks.

During the recording, Hannon's vocals had to be recorded more hurriedly than planned because for most of the two weeks, he was suffering from a cold that got progressively worse before finally clearing up.

== Release and reception ==
A special edition version of the album, officially available only on the first day of release, came with a bonus DVD and an additional cardboard sleeve.

On 28 February 2007, Victory for the Comic Muse won the Choice Music Prize at a ceremony that took place in Dublin's Vicar Street venue. The Choice Music Prize is Ireland's equivalent to the Mercury Music Prize. The judging panel was made up of 12 representatives from the Irish music industry. The prize consisted of a trophy as well as a cheque for €10,000. The Divine Comedy's victory was unexpected, as the album had received some mediocre reviews, became their first album (and currently only) since their mainstream breakthrough in Ireland to miss the top 20 of their albums chart, while there was strong competition from the likes of The Immediate, Duke Special and Snow Patrol.

Since the release of this album, others that have followed have all gone top ten in either the UK or Ireland, but this is to date their only album era to witness any award wins, despite its commercial and critical mediocre reception.

== Track listing ==
All songs written by Neil Hannon except where noted.

No.	Title	Length
1.	"To Die a Virgin"	3:39
2.	"Mother Dear"	3:47
3.	"Diva Lady"	4:17
4.	"A Lady of a Certain Age"	5:47
5.	"The Light of Day"	4:24
6.	"Threesome" (instrumental)	1:10
7.	"Party Fears Two" (Billy Mackenzie, Alan Rankine)	4:02
8.	"Arthur C. Clarke's Mysterious World"	3:58
9.	"The Plough"	5:14
10.	"Count Grassi's Passage Over Piedmont"	3:32
11.	"Snowball in Negative"	4:40
Total length:		44:34

Japanese edition bonus tracks
No.	Title	Length
12.	"Premonition of Love" (instrumental)	3:54
13.	"Births & Deaths & Marriages"	4:11
Total length:		52:39

- "Party Fears Two" was originally written and recorded by The Associates.

== Personnel ==
=== Musicians ===
- Neil Hannon – vocals, keyboards, acoustic guitar, electric guitar, banjo
- Ian Watson – accordion
- John Evans – acoustic guitar, electric guitar
- Charlotte Glasson – baritone saxophone, tenor saxophone
- Chris Worsey – cello
- Ian Burdge – cello
- Chris Richards – clarinet
- Tim Weller – drums
- Dougie Payne – electric bass
- Simon Little – electric bass, double bass
- Eliza Marshall – flute
- Matthew Gunner – French horn
- Camilla Pay – harp
- Celine Saout – harp
- Andrew Skeet – piano, harpsichord
- Ilid Jones – oboe, cor anglais
- Rob Farrer – percussion
- Mike Kearsey – trombone
- Daniel Newell – trumpet
- John Metcalfe – viola
- Reiad Chibah – viola
- Alison Dods – violin
- Andrew Haveron – violin
- Anna Kirkpatrick – violin
- Calina De La Mare – violin
- Gillon Cameron – violin
- Lucy Wilkins – violin
- Rick Koster – violin
- Ruth Rogers – violin
- Sonia Slany – violin

=== Technical personnel ===
- Neil Hannon – producer, arranger
- Andrew Skeet – musical director, additional arrangements
- Laurence Aldridge – engineer
- Mark Bishop – engineer
- Raj Das – engineer
- Richard Woodcraft – engineer
- Steve Rooke – mastering
- Tom Sheehan – photography
- Adrian Green – stamp photography
- Cally – art direction, design
- Jason Long – design
- Nik Rose – design
- Divine Management – management
- Chris Worsey – Millennia Ensemble management
- Jonathan Brigden – Millennia Ensemble management

== Cultural references ==
- "Arthur C. Clarke's Mysterious World" is a reference to the 80s television show of the same name.
- The sample at the beginning of "To Die a Virgin" is of Jennifer Ehle and Toby Stephens in the 1992 TV series The Camomile Lawn.
