= A Short Album About Love =

Studio album by The Divine Comedy
- Released: 10 February 1997
- Recorded: 20 October 1996
- Studios: Shepherd's Bush Empire, London
- Genre: Orchestral pop
- Length: 31:58
- Label: Setanta

The Divine Comedy chronology
Casanova (1996)	A Short Album About Love (1997)	Fin de Siècle (1998)

Singles from A Short Album About Love
- 1. "Everybody Knows (Except You)" Released: 10 March 1997

A Short Album About Love is the fifth studio album by Northern Irish chamber pop band the Divine Comedy, released in 1997 by Setanta Records. It was recorded on 20 October 1996 at Shepherd's Bush Empire, London.

== Release ==
"Everybody Knows (Except You)" was released as a single on three separate CDs, each one featuring an extra three live tracks. It became one of the band's biggest hits, reaching No. 14 in the UK charts.

== In other media ==
The middle eight of the opening track "In Pursuit of Happiness" was subsequently adopted as the theme for the TV series Tomorrow's World. The original version was used for one season of the show, with a specially-recorded version being substituted thereafter.

== Critical reception ==
Professional ratings
Review scores
Source	Rating
AllMusic	4.5/5 stars
Encyclopedia of Popular Music	4/5 stars
The Great Rock Discography	7/10
The Guardian	4/5 stars
MusicHound	4.5/5
NME	8/10
Q	4/5 stars
The Rolling Stone Album Guide	3/5 stars
Select	3/5

In a review for AllMusic, Stephen Thomas Erlewine wrote that the album was singer Neil Hannon "[deciding] to indulge his Scott Walker fetish", opining that "A Short Album About Love is, if anything, an even better record than [previous album] Casanova, simply because Hannon holds nothing back." He went on to state that "These are grandiose, extravagant songs that work because of their very pretensions."

The album was included in the book 1001 Albums You Must Hear Before You Die.

== Track listing ==
All songs written by Neil Hannon, except where stated.

No.	Title	Length
1.	"In Pursuit of Happiness"	3:31
2.	"Everybody Knows (Except You)"	3:48
3.	"Someone"	5:58
4.	"If..."	4:25
5.	"If I Were You (I'd Be Through with Me)"	4:41
6.	"Timewatching"	4:42
7.	"I'm All You Need"	4:51

European edition bonus tracks

No.	Title	Length
8.	"Motorway to Damascus"
9.	"Love Is Lighter Than Air" (Stephin Merritt)
10.	"Birds of Paradise Farm"
11.	"Make It Easy on Yourself" (Burt Bacharach, Hal David)

- "Birds of Paradise Farm" is a studio recording, produced by Darren Allison and Hannon, during the Casanova album sessions, and as such, features a completely different line-up to the band heard on the rest of the album, with Allison playing drums and percussion, Hannon playing "everything else", and strings/woodwinds recorded at Abbey Road Studios. "Birds of Paradise Farm" had previously appeared as a B-side of the "Something for the Weekend" single.
- "Love Is Lighter Than Air" and "Motorway to Damascus" are also studio recordings, this time featuring the newly formed, post-Casanova, core live Divine Comedy band. Both tracks had also appeared as B-sides to Casanova-era singles: "Something for the Weekend" and "The Frog Princess", respectively.

== Personnel ==
The Divine Comedy

- Neil Hannon – vocals, guitar
- Ivor Talbot – guitar
- Bryan Mills – bass guitar
- Joby Talbot – piano, orchestral arrangements
- Stuart "Pinkie" Bates – Hammond organ
- Miguel Barradas – drums

The Brunel Ensemble

- Simon Baggs – violin, orchestra leader
- Lisa Betteridge, Kate Birchall, Krista Juanita Caspersz, Emily Davis, Benjamin Harte, Mary Martin, Timothy Myall, Benjamin Nabarro, Juliet Warden – violins
- Yannick Dondelinger, Zoe Lake, Jong On Lau, John Murphy – violas
- Betsy Taylor, Robbie Jacobs, Douncan Moulton – celli
- Peter Devlin, Philip Dawson – double basses
- Max Spiers – oboe
- Charlotte Glasson – saxophone, flute
- Matthew Gunner – horn
- Simon Jones – trumpet
- Adam Howard – trumpet, flugelhorn
- Jane Butterfield – trombone
- Robert Farrer – percussion
- Christopher Austin – conductor

== Charts ==
Chart performance for A Short Album About Love
Chart (1997)	Peak position
Irish Albums (IRMA)	8
UK Albums (Official Charts)	13

== Certifications ==
Region	Certification	Certified units/sales
United Kingdom (BPI)	Silver	60,000^{^}
^{^} Shipments figures based on certification alone.
