= Fin de Siècle (album) =

Studio album by the Divine Comedy
- Released: 31 August 1998
- Recorded: 1998
- Studio: September Sound; Olympic; The Dairy
- Genre: Chamber pop
- Length: 46:41
- Label: Setanta
- Producer: Jon Jacobs; Neil Hannon

The Divine Comedy chronology
A Short Album About Love (1997)	Fin de Siècle (1998)	A Secret History... The Best of the Divine Comedy (1999)

Singles from Fin de Siècle
- 1. "Generation Sex" Released: 14 September 1998; 2. "The Certainty of Chance" Released: 9 November 1998; 3. "National Express" Released: 25 January 1999

Fin de Siècle (French: "End of the century") is the sixth album by Northern Irish pop band the Divine Comedy. It was released on 31 August 1998 by Setanta Records. Following the release of fifth studio album A Short Album About Love (1997), frontman Neil Hannon demoed new material at his flat in Clapham. During this time, the relationship between the band and their label Setanta Records was straining as a result of heated discussions over tour costs and studio sessions. They recorded their next album in three studios (September Sound, Olympic and The Dairy) with Jon Jacobs as the main producer and Hannon co-producing. Fin de Siècle is a chamber pop concept album that details living in the 20th century.

Fin de Siècle reached number nine in the UK Albums Chart; all of its singles charted on the UK Singles Chart, with "National Express" reaching the highest at number eight. Fin de Siècle was certified gold by the British Phonographic Industry in 1998, while "National Express" was certified silver in 2021. Prior to the album's release, the Divine Comedy headlined the New Stage at Glastonbury Festival in 1998; "Generation Sex" was released as the album's lead single in September 1998. Following this, the band went on a tour of the United Kingdom, and by its end, "The Certainty of Chance" was released as the album's second single. Leading up to a benefit show in early 1999, "National Express" was released as the album's third and final single.

== Background and recording ==
The Divine Comedy released their fifth studio album A Short Album About Love in February 1997. It was met with favourable reviews from music critics and peaked at number 13 on the UK Albums Chart, while its sole single "Everybody Knows (Except You)" reached number 14. When writing the next album, Hannon was listening to an album by Jacques Brel, which he thought had "ten perfect tracks" on it, and set about writing such a collection for the Divine Comedy. He demoed material in a spare room in his Clapham flat, where he was living with his girlfriend.

Hannon spent a month playing the PlayStation game Overboard! (1997), marking his first break from writing since 1989. During this period, the band's relationship with their label Setanta Records was deteriorating, with discussions about studio sessions and tour budgets resulting in heated debates. Fin de Siècle was recorded at September Sound, Olympic Studios and The Dairy, with Jon Jacobs acting as the main producer and co-production from Hannon. Jacobs also served as engineer, with additional engineering by Andy Scade; they were assisted Mitsuo Tate, Adam Brown and Mak Togashi. Jacobs mixed the recordings at Westpoint.

== Composition and lyrics ==
Fin de Siècle is a chamber pop album; its title is French for "end of the century". Time Out referred to it as a concept album that "pick[s] at the scabs of twentieth century existence". Discussing the album title, Hannon said it deals with "other people's angst really, and it's more about the end of the century being a good excuse to have a look around and observe". AllMusic reviewer Jack Rabid said the Scott Walker influences on the band's previous albums had "largely diminishe[d]... if not actually eras[ed]" by this point. Matthew Greenwald of AllMusic said the album's opening song "Generation Sex" revolves around "hedonism in the late 20th century". In one of the verses, Hannon criticises the tabloid press over their role with the death of Diana, Princess of Wales, alongside the British public who blame the newspapers while continuing to buy them.

"Thrillseeker" is one of three songs, the other two being "National Express" and "Here Comes the Flood", that evoke the style of a Broadway musical, complete with a choir ensemble. "Commuter Love" sees Hannon detail unrequited love; Hilary Summers contributed vocals to both it and the following track "Sweden", the latter aping the work of Richard Wagner. For "Sweden", Hannon wanted to convey the country as a utopian paradise. He said percussionist Rob Farrer was tasked with "recreating 'the sound of Thor's hammer, Mjölnir, being forged by the dwarves of Svartalvheim'". "Eric the Gardener", which includes programming courtesy of Steve Hilton, is centered around a six-note scale, played in a minimalistic style. It ends with a three-minute trip hop section in the vein of Orbital.

"National Express" is a homage to a UK public coach transportation company. Hannon had written it in 1995, but thought it did not fit within the sound of their studio albums Casanova (1996) and A Short Album About Love. Discussing the song, he said he and his girlfriend went to visit his brother; to do so, they took the coach service of the same name. He wrote the lyrics from her perspective and combined them with a "skiffle-y, train-a-comin’ vibe [... a] piano motif. And this big, brassy chorus, sort of end-of-the-pier". "Here Comes the Flood", which features narration from Dexter Fletcher, come across like the work of Andrew Lloyd Webber and is about "Hollywood's idea of the apocalypse". The album's closing track "Sunrise", which was written around the time of the Good Friday Agreement, sees Hannon reminisce about his childhood upbringing in Enniskillen, as well as ponder Northern Ireland's future.

== Release ==
The Divine Comedy released a split single with Shola Ama, contributing a cover of "I've Been to a Marvellous Party" (1938) by Noël Coward. On 9 May 1998, Fin de Siècle was announced for released in three months' time. Following this, the Divine Comedy played a warm-up show in Portsmouth in preparation for the headlining slot of the Glastonbury Festival. Fin de Siècle was released on 31 August 1999; its artwork is a monochrome image featuring Hannon in funeral director attire. "Generation Sex" was released as the album's lead single on 14 September 1998; the 7-inch vinyl version included "Postcard to Rosie". Two versions were released on CD: the first with "London Irish" and "Time Lapse", while the second featured "Chasing Sheep Is Best Left to Shepherds" and "Little Acts Of Kindness". In October 1998, the band went on a headlining tour of the UK.

"The Certainty of Chance" was released as a single on 9 November 1998; the cassette edition included "Maryland Electric Rainstorm". Two versions were released on CD: the first with "Last Stand in Metroland" and "Miranda", while the second featured "The Dead Only Quickly" and "Knowing the Ropes". The music video for "The Certainty of Chance" is a recreation of a scene from The Manchurian Candidate (1962) with Hannon starring in Frank Sinatra's role. "National Express" was released as the album's third single on 25 January 1999; the cassette edition included "The Heart of Rock and Roll". Two versions were released on CD: the first with "Going Downhill Fast", "Radioactivity" and a radio edit for "National Express", while the second featured "Famous" and "Overstrand". The Divine Comedy performed at the Concert for a Living Wage benefit show in March 1999 and at the Bowlie Weekender in April 1999.

Fin de Siècle was combined with Casanova as a two-CD set for the French market in 1998. Fin de Siècle was reissued as an expanded two-CD set in 2020, either standalone or as part of the Venus, Cupid, Folly and Time – Thirty Years of the Divine Comedy career-spanning box set. The regular version of the album was re-pressed on vinyl that same year. "Generation Sex", "National Express" and "The Certainty of Chance" were included on the band's first and second compilation albums A Secret History... The Best of the Divine Comedy (1999) and Charmed Life – The Best of the Divine Comedy (2020).

== Reception ==
Professional ratings
Review scores
Source	Rating
AllMusic	3/5 stars
NME	6/10

Fin de Siècle was met with generally favourable reviews from music critics. Rabid noted that the songs "though pleasant, don't quite scale the heights Neil Hannon has before: nothing is as arresting" as their previous album, outside of three of the tracks. He said that the "'60s-movie oom-pah pomp and bombast that introduces each verse is fabulous", before adding that Hannon has "done better" previously. Kevin Harley of Record Collector said it "tipped the jokes and arrangements towards overload, though a tempering beauty emerged" on songs such as "Sunrise" and "The Certainty of Chance". NME writer James Oldham echoed a similar sentiment, stating that it was "toweringly ambitious and painfully preposterous, it lurches from the insubstantial to the melodramatic in the blink of an eyelid". He thought it was "just as revealing as anything else he's ever written [...] with less memorable tunes". Hannon himself later said it was the "absolute height of my egotism, you know? [...] I literally thought I could do anything. And so we did".

In an article for We Are Cult commemorating the album's 20th anniversary, Stephen Graham said:

Immediately entering the album charts at number nine, the album would go on to provide the band's first top-ten single. Combining bombast and longing, the surreal with the terrifying, evoking past grandeur while examining today and our future, the album was Hannon's most mature and rounded work to date.

Fin de Siècle peaked at number nine on the UK Albums Chart. "Generation Sex" charted at number 19, while "The Certainty of Chance" reached number 49 and "National Express" made it to number eight, making it the band's highest charting single to date. Fin de Siècle was certified gold by the British Phonographic Industry in 1998, who later certified "National Express" as silver in 2021.

== Track listing ==
All songs written by Neil Hannon, except for "Eric the Gardener" and "The Certainty of Chance", written by Hannon and Joby Talbot.

No.	Title	Length
1.	"Generation Sex"	3:31
2.	"Thrillseeker"	3:33
3.	"Commuter Love"	4:42
4.	"Sweden"	3:25
5.	"Eric the Gardener"	8:26
6.	"National Express"	5:05
7.	"Life on Earth"	4:23
8.	"The Certainty of Chance"	6:06
9.	"Here Comes the Flood"	4:09
10.	"Sunrise"	3:17

== Personnel ==
Personnel per booklet.

The Divine Comedy

- Neil Hannon – vocals, guitar
- Ivor Talbot – guitar
- Bryan Mills – guitar
- Joby Talbot – piano, harpsichord, arranger, conductor
- Stuart Bates – organ, accordion
- Miggy Barradas – drums
- Rob Farrer – percussion

Additional musicians

- Hilary Summers – vocals (tracks 3 and 4)
- Dexter Fletcher – narration (track 9)
- Steve Hilton – programming (track 5)

Production and design

- Jon Jacobs – producer, engineer, mixing
- Neil Hannon – co-producer, sleeve concept
- Andy Scade – additional engineer, programming
- Mitsuo Tate – assistant
- Adam Brown – assistant
- Mak Togashi – assistant
- Kevin Westenberg – sleeve concept, photography
- Rob Crane – design

The Brunel Ensemble

- Chris Austin – director
- Christopher George – violin 1
- Maya Bickel – violin 1
- Kate Birchall – violin 1
- Benjamin Harte – violin 1
- Bérénice Lavigne – violin 1
- Mary Martin – violin 1
- Benjamin Nabarro – violin 1
- Roy Theaker – violin 1
- Charles Mutter – violin 2
- Aroussiak Baltaian – violin 2
- Eos Counsell – violin 2
- Anna Giddey – violin 2
- Kelly McCusker – violin 2
- Emma Mitchell – violin 2
- Timothy Myall – violin 2
- Matthew Ward – violin 2
- Yannick Dondelinger – viola
- David Aspin – viola
- Joanna Lacey – viola
- Jong on Lau – viola
- John Murphy – viola
- Robert Riley – viola
- Betsy Taylor – cello
- Emmeline Brewer – cello
- Christopher Fish – cello
- Louise Hopkins – cello
- Robbie Jacobs – cello
- Peter Devlin – double bass
- Philip Dawson – double bass
- Ian Watson – double bass
- Rebecca Larson – flute, alto flute, piccolo
- Max Spiers – oboe, cor anglais
- Stuart King – clarinet, bass clarinet
- Simon Haram – soprano saxophone
- Charlotte Glasson – soprano saxophone, tenor saxophone, baritone saxophone, flute
- Chris Caldwell – alto saxophone
- Kelvin Christiane – tenor saxophone
- Rebecca Menday – bassoon
- Matthew Guner – horn
- Tansy Davis – horn
- Jonathan Hassan – horn
- Jonathan Morcombe – horn
- Daniel Newell – trumpet
- Mark Law – trumpet
- Simon Jones – trumpet, piccolo trumpet
- Robert Samuel – trumpet
- Tom Hammond – trombone
- Andrew Harwood-White – bass trombone
- Simon Roberts – tuba
- Lucy Wakeford – harp
- Deborah Keyser – administrator

Crouch End Festival Chorus

- David Temple – chorus master
- Rachael Conner – soprano
- Denise Haddon – soprano
- Gisela Soinne – soprano
- Nina Weiss – soprano
- Julia White – soprano
- Jenny Weston – soprano
- Pamela Constantinou – soprano
- Pat Whitehead – soprano
- Liz Knight – soprano
- Sue McCrone – soprano
- Allison Mason – soprano
- Naomi Fulop – soprano
- Felicity Ford – soprano
- Alison Brister – alto
- Tina Burnett-Pope – alto
- Jo Chapman – alto
- Veronica Gray – alto
- Rhael Jenkins – alto
- Elise Golden – alto
- Jane Helliwell – alto
- Pauline Hoyle – alto
- Catherine Best – alto
- Maggie Huntingford – alto
- Claire Turner – alto
- Michael Coates – tenor
- John Best – tenor
- Steve McAdam – tenor
- Ken Wilson – tenor
- Nick Turner – tenor
- Philip Robinson – tenor
- Christopher Higgs – tenor
- Barry Varley-Tipton – tenor
- Roger Cleave – bass
- Geoff Kemball-Cook – bass
- Robert Goodall – bass
- Paul Haddon – bass
- Martin Hudson – bass
- Bruce Boyd – bass
- Vincent Lawler – bass
- Paul Mason – bass
- Lenny Fagin – bass
- Stephen Greenway – bass
- Ian Lawrence – bass
- John Gibbons – bass
- Matthew Turner – bass

== Charts and certifications ==
=== Weekly charts ===
Chart performance for Fin de Siècle
Chart (1998)	Peak position
French Albums (SNEP)	23
UK Albums (OCC)	9

=== Certifications ===
Certifications for Fin de Siècle
Region	Certification	Certified units/sales
United Kingdom (BPI)	Gold	100,000^{^}
^{^} Shipments figures based on certification alone.
