= Bang Goes the Knighthood =

Studio album by The Divine Comedy
- Released: 31 May 2010
- Recorded: 2009
- Studio: Exchequer Street (Dublin); Westland (Dublin)
- Genre: Orchestral pop, art rock
- Length: 44:55
- Label: Divine Comedy
- Producer: Neil Hannon

The Divine Comedy chronology
Victory for the Comic Muse (2006)	Bang Goes the Knighthood (2010)	Foreverland (2016)

Singles from Bang Goes the Knighthood
- 1. "At the Indie Disco" Released: 24 May 2010; 2. "I Like" Released: 10 August 2010

Professional ratings
Review scores
Source	Rating
AllMusic	3.5/5 stars
BBC Online	positive
The Independent	positive
Record Collector	4/5 stars
Belfast Telegraph	4/5 stars
Financial Times	3/5 stars
The Guardian	3/5 stars
The Daily Telegraph	3/5 stars
Pitchfork	(7.6/10)

Bang Goes the Knighthood is the tenth studio album by Northern Irish chamber pop band the Divine Comedy, released on 31 May 2010 by Divine Comedy Records.

== Track listing ==
All tracks are written by Neil Hannon, except where noted.

No.	Title	Length
1.	"Down in the Street Below"	5:08
2.	"The Complete Banker"	3:43
3.	"Neapolitan Girl"	2:49
4.	"Bang Goes the Knighthood"	2:48
5.	"At the Indie Disco" (featuring Cathy Davey)	3:18
6.	"Have You Ever Been in Love" (featuring Cathy Davey)	3:10
7.	"Assume the Perpendicular"	4:06
8.	"The Lost Art of Conversation"	4:01
9.	"Island Life" (featuring Cathy Davey)	4:36
10.	"When a Man Cries"	3:54
11.	"Can You Stand Upon One Leg"	3:32
12.	"I Like"	3:48

iTunes bonus tracks
No.	Title	Length
13.	"Ya Sumeera"	2:39
14.	"Beside the Railway Tracks"	2:57
15.	"The Circular Firing Squad"	2:51
16.	"Napoleon Complex"	4:20

Bonus disc: recorded live at the Cité de la Musique, Sept. 2008
No.	Title	Writer(s)	Length
1.	"Amsterdam"	Jacques Brel	3:33
2.	"L'Amour est Bleu"	André Popp, Pierre Cour	3:25
3.	"Poupée de cire, poupée de son"	Serge Gainsbourg	3:13
4.	"Les Playboys"	Jacques Dutronc, Jacques Lanzmann	3:25
5.	"The Songs That We Sing"	Jarvis Cocker, Jean-Benoît Dunckel, Neil Hannon, Nicolas Godin	3:02
6.	"Les copains d'abord"	Georges Brassens	3:56
7.	"Anita Pettersen"	Vincent Delerm	4:55
8.	"Joe le taxi"	Franck Langolff, Étienne Roda-Gil	4:24
9.	"Je changerais d'avis"	Ennio Morricone, Ghigo De Chiara, Maurizio Costanzo	3:39

== Personnel ==
Personnel adapted from liner notes included in Venus, Cupid, Folly & Time – Thirty Years of The Divine Comedy.

Musicians

- Neil Hannon – vocals, piano
- Tim Weller – drums
- Cathy Davey – guest vocals (tracks 5–6, 9), drums (track 5)
- Thomas Walsh – guest vocals (tracks 2, 11), acoustic guitar (tracks 5, 8)
- Tosh Flood – guest vocals (track 1), electric guitar (track 5)
- Millennia Ensemble – orchestral performances

Technical

- Neil Hannon – producer, artwork concept
- Fergal Davis – engineer
- Ross Martin – additional engineering
- Guy Massey – engineering, mixing (tracks 2, 5, 7–8, 12)
- Bill Somerville-Large – mixing (tracks 1, 3–4, 6, 9–10)
- Dan Grech – mixing (track 11)
- Andrew Skeet – orchestral arrangements and conductor (tracks 1, 5–7, 9–10)
- Brian Hickey – artwork concept
- Pauline Rowan – photography
