= Mark Templeton (trombonist) =

British trombonist

Mark Templeton (born 1975) is Principal Trombone of the London Philharmonic Orchestra.

Templeton studied at the Guildhall School of Music and Drama from 1994-1998. During this time he became principal of the Gustav Mahler Youth Orchestra. He then became a freelance trombonist in London where he built up regular playing with the likes of the London Symphony Orchestra, Philharmonia Orchestra and Royal Philharmonic Orchestra.

In 2006 he was appointed Principal Trombone at the LPO.
