= Fanfare for the Comic Muse =

Studio album by The Divine Comedy
- Released: July 1990
- Recorded: May 1990
- Genre: Jangle pop, alternative rock
- Length: 26:34
- Label: Setanta
- Producer: Sean O Neill

The Divine Comedy chronology
Fanfare for the Comic Muse (1990)	Liberation (1993)

Professional ratings
Review scores
Source	Rating
AllMusic	3/5 stars
Select	4/5

Fanfare for the Comic Muse is the debut album by Northern Irish chamber pop band the Divine Comedy, released in 1990 by Setanta Records. Recording took place at Homestead Studios in May 1990 with producer Sean O Neill. Lorcan Mac Loughlann engineered the sessions, and Mudd Wallace mixed the recordings.

The album has since been disowned by the band's lead singer/songwriter, Neil Hannon, due to its stylistic differences from the band's later works. "The Rise and Fall" was later re-recorded for the Timewatch EP (1991).

In 2020, the album was re-released for the first time as part of the 23-CD box set Venus, Cupid, Folly & Time - Thirty Years of the Divine Comedy. The tracks are featured on the second CD of the Juveneilia set, alongside remastered versions of the Timewatch and Europop EPs. On this reissue most of the tracks from Fanfare and Europop are damaged with glitches.

== Track listing ==
All songs written by Neil Hannon.

No.	Title	Length
1.	"Ignorance Is Bliss"	3:42
2.	"Indian Rain"	3:24
3.	"Bleak Landscape"	3:40
4.	"Tailspin"	2:44
5.	"The Rise and Fall"	4:21
6.	"Logic vs Emotion"	4:34
7.	"Secret Garden"	4:09
Total length:		26:34

== Personnel ==
Personnel per booklet.

The Divine Comedy

- Neil Hannon – vocals, guitar
- John McCullagh – bass, backing vocals
- Kevin Traynor – drums, percussion

Production

- Sean O Neill – producer
- Lorcan Mac Loughlann – engineer
- Mudd Wallace – mixing
