= Neil Hannon =

Northern Irish singer and songwriter (born 1970)

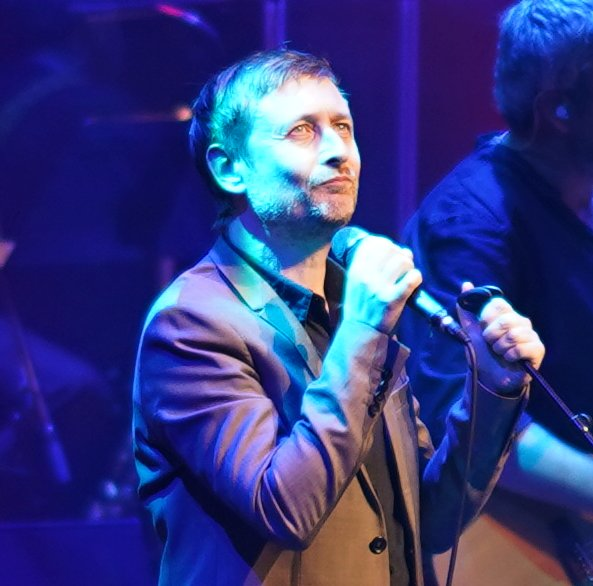
- Hannon performing in 2022

Background information
- Born: 7 November 1970 (age 56); Derry, Northern Ireland
- Origin: Enniskillen, Northern Ireland
- Genres: Alternative rock; Britpop; art rock; baroque pop; art pop; chamber pop; jangle pop; orchestral pop; alt-pop; film score
- Occupations: Singer; songwriter
- Instruments: Vocals; guitar; piano; keyboards
- Years active: 1986–present
- Labels: Setanta; Parlophone; Divine Comedy
- Member of: The Divine Comedy; the Duckworth Lewis Method
- Website: thedivinecomedy.com

Edward Neil Anthony Hannon (born 7 November 1970) is an Irish singer and songwriter. He is the founder and frontman of the chamber pop group the Divine Comedy, and is the band's only constant member since its inception in 1989. Hannon wrote the theme tunes for the television sitcoms Father Ted and The IT Crowd, as well as the original songs for the musical film Wonka (2023).

== Early life and education ==
Hannon was born in Derry, Northern Ireland, the son of Brian Hannon, a Church of Ireland minister in the Diocese of Derry and Raphoe and later Bishop of Clogher. He spent some of his youth in Fivemiletown before moving with his family to Enniskillen, in County Fermanagh, in 1982. While there, he attended Portora Royal School.

Hannon grew up in Northern Ireland during The Troubles. He has stated that part of the reason he writes the music he does is to escape that past, sharing some of his opinions on the topic in the final song on his 1998 album Fin de Siècle, "Sunrise".

Hannon enjoyed synthesizer-based music as a youngster: he has identified the Human League and OMD as "the first music that really excited [him]". In the late 1980s he developed a fondness of the electric guitar, becoming an "indie kid".

== Career ==
Hannon is founder and mainstay of the Divine Comedy, a band that achieved commercial success in the mid- to late-1990s with the albums Casanova (1996), A Short Album About Love (1997), and Fin de Siècle (1998). Hannon continues to release albums as The Divine Comedy, the most recent being Rainy Sunday Afternoon which was released on 19 September 2025.

Hannon composed the theme music for the sitcoms Father Ted and The IT Crowd, the former composed for the show and later reworked into "Songs of Love", a track on the Divine Comedy's breakthrough album Casanova. Both shows were created or co-created by Graham Linehan. For the Father Ted episode, "A Song for Europe", Hannon co-wrote and sang "My Lovely Horse", the song Ted and Dougal enter in Eurosong (a parody of the Eurovision Song Contest). For the same episode, Hannon wrote "The Miracle Is Mine", the 'typical' Eurovision ballad sung by Ted's nemesis, Father Dick Byrne. A dream sequence in the episode shows Ted and Dougal in the song's pop video, with Hannon providing vocals. Hannon also wrote and performed "My Lovely Mayo Mammy", sung by Eoin McLove in the episode "Night of the Nearly Dead", and wrote "Big Men in Frocks", sung by Niamh Connolly (played by Clare Grogan) in "Rock-a-Hula Ted". When a raffle is held in order to raise funds to repair the roof of the parochial house, the Kraftwerk-esque quartet of priests enlisted to perform play an electronic piece of music composed and performed by him. Both of the advertisements for telephone numbers; in The IT Crowd (the new emergency number) and Father Ted (Priest Chatback) have jingles composed by Hannon. In the episode "A Christmassy Ted", his name is mentioned by Mrs Doyle while she attempts to guess that of the mysterious guest.

In 2000, he and Joby Talbot contributed four tracks to Ute Lemper's collaboration album, Punishing Kiss.

In 2004, Hannon performed alongside the Ulster Orchestra for the opening event of the Belfast Festival at Queen's. In 2005, he contributed vocals to Talbot's soundtrack for the movie version of The Hitchhiker's Guide to the Galaxy.

In 2006, it was announced that Hannon was to lend vocals to the Doctor Who soundtrack CD release, recording two songs – "Love Don't Roam", for the 2006 Christmas special "The Runaway Bride"; and a new version of "Song for Ten", which originally appeared in 2005's "The Christmas Invasion". On 12 January 2007, The Guardian website's "Media Monkey" diary column reported that Doctor Who fans from the discussion forum on the fan website Outpost Gallifrey were attempting to organise mass downloads of the Hannon-sung "Love Don't Roam", which was available as a single release in the UK iTunes Store. This was in order to attempt to exploit the new UK Singles Chart download rules, and get the song featured in the Top 40 releases.

The same year, Hannon sang and wrote the lyrics for the song "Somewhere Between Waking and Sleeping" on the Air album Pocket Symphony, released in the United States on 6 March 2007. This song had been originally written for and sung by Charlotte Gainsbourg on her 2006 album 5:55. Though it was not included on its 2006 European release, it was added as a bonus track to its American release on 24 April 2007.

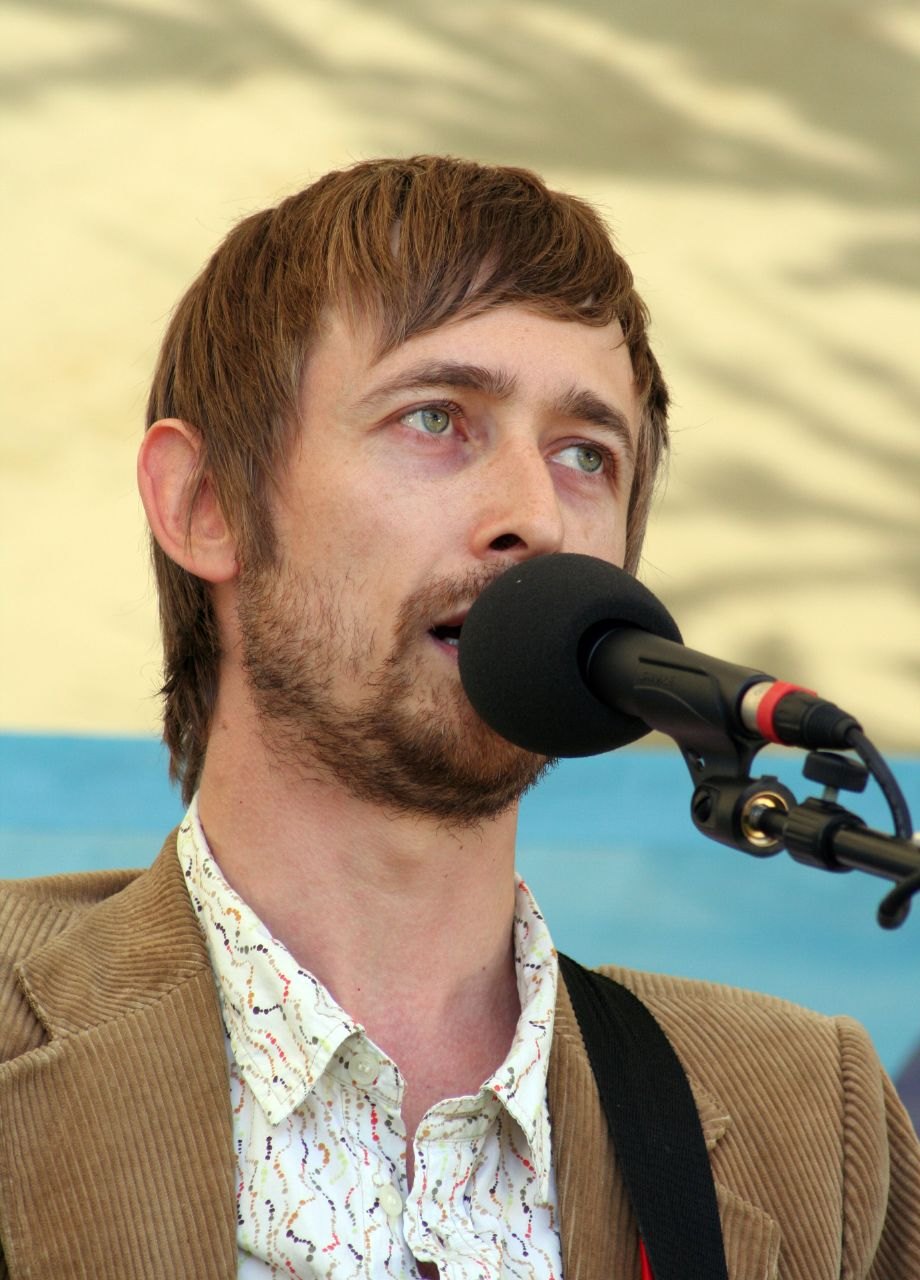
Hannon performing in 2007

Hannon won the 2007 Choice Music Prize for his 2006 album, Victory for the Comic Muse. It was announced the following day that he had left EMI by 'mutual consent'. When the band Keane played at the O2 Arena in London that July, "A Bad Dream" was introduced by Hannon, who read the poem "An Irish Airman Foresees His Death" by W. B. Yeats, upon which the song is based.

In 2009, Hannon collaborated with Thomas Walsh from the Irish band Pugwash to create a cricket-themed pop album, under the name the Duckworth Lewis Method. The first single, "The Age of Revolution", was released in June 2009, and was followed by an eponymous full-length album the week after. The group's second album, Sticky Wickets, came out in 2013.

Hannon composed the music for a stage adaptation of Arthur Ransome's novel Swallows and Amazons (1930), which premiered in December 2010 at the Bristol Old Vic, with book and lyrics by Helen Edmundson. A new Divine Comedy album, Bang Goes the Knighthood, was released in May 2010.

On 20 April 2012, Hannon's first opera commission, Sevastopol, was performed by the Royal Opera House in London. The piece was part of a program called OperaShots, which invites musicians not typically working within the opera medium to create an opera, and was based upon Leo Tolstoy's Sevastopol Sketches. Hannon's second opera for which he composed the music, In May (with book by Frank Alva Buecheler and English translations by Tim Clarke), premiered at Lancaster University's Nuffield Theatre in May 2013.

In 2013, Hannon was commissioned by the Southbank Centre to compose a piece for the Royal Festival Hall's refurbished organ: To Our Fathers in Distress, "a kind of oratorio" for chorus, strings and organ, premiered at the Hall in London on 22 March 2014, as part of the Pull Out All the Stop Festival, and was inspired by Hannon's father, the Rt Rev Brian Hannon, who had suffered from Alzheimer's disease before his death in 2022. In 2015, Neil won the 2015 Legend Award from the Oh Yeah organisation in Belfast.

Hannon wrote the soundtrack and songs for the Irish sci-fi film LOLA, for which he won an IFTA Award at the 2024 IFTAs.

Hannon wrote the songs for the 2023 musical film Wonka.

Following his work on Wonka, Hannon, with Dougal Wilson and Mark Burton, co-wrote the song "Let's Prepare for Paddington" for the 2024 film Paddington in Peru.

On 28 January 2024 Hannon was the guest of Michael Berkeley on the BBC Radio 3 programme Private Passions. His choices included Chopin's Nocturne in E flat major, Op 9, No. 2, Ravel's String Quartet in F major and "Montague Terrace (In Blue)" by Scott Walker.

== Personal life ==
Since 2009, Hannon and Irish musician Cathy Davey have been a couple; they married in January 2023 and live in County Kildare. He was previously married to Orla Little, with whom he has a daughter, born about 2002. With Davey, Hannon is a patron of the Irish animal charity My Lovely Horse Rescue, named after the Father Ted Eurovision song for which he wrote the music.

Politically, Hannon describes himself as being "a thoroughly leftie, Guardian-reading chap, but of the champagne socialist variety".

== Discography ==
=== The Divine Comedy ===
- Fanfare for the Comic Muse (1990)
- Liberation (1993)
- Promenade (1994)
- Casanova (1996)
- A Short Album About Love (1997)
- Fin de Siècle (1998)
- Regeneration (2001)
- Absent Friends (2004)
- Victory for the Comic Muse (2006)
- Bang Goes the Knighthood (2010)
- Foreverland (2016)
- Office Politics (2019)
- Rainy Sunday Afternoon (2025)

=== Other contributions ===
- The Cake Sale (compilation) – "Aliens"
- Doctor Who: Original Television Soundtrack (compilation) – "Song for Ten" and "Love Don't Roam" (performer)
- Amélie (compilation) – "Les Jours tristes" (instrumental version) (co-writer)
- L'Absente by Yann Tiersen – "Les Jours tristes" (English version) (co-writer and performer)
- The Hitchhiker's Guide to the Galaxy Soundtrack (compilation) – "So Long and Thanks for All the Fish" (performer)
- Reload by Tom Jones – "All Mine" (as the Divine Comedy) (performer)
- Pocket Symphony by Air – "Somewhere Between Waking and Sleeping" (writer and performer)
- Songs from the Deep Forest by Duke Special – "Our Love Goes Deeper Than This" (performer)
- Hyacinths and Thistles by the 6ths – "The Dead Only Quickly" (singer)
- Eleven Modern Antiquities by Pugwash – "Take Me Away" (performer)
- Punishing Kiss by Ute Lemper – (multiple tracks) (performer and writer)
- Les piqûres d'araignée by Vincent Delerm – "Favourite Song" (duet track)
- A Mãe by Rodrigo Leão – "Cathy" (performer)
- God Help the Girl by God Help the Girl – "Perfection as a Hipster"; Neil Hannon with Catherine Ireton (performer)
- "No Regrets" by Robbie Williams – backing vocals with Neil Tennant of Pet Shop Boys
- The Silent World of Hector Mann by Duke Special – "Wanda, Darling of the Jockey Club"
- Irrepetible by Coque Malla – duets on "My Beautiful Monster"
- Adventure Man by Eg – "Pay Later" and "If You Run" (co-writer and performer)
- Holy Motors - composer and songs
- LOLA – soundtrack and songs
- Wonka – songs (co-writer)
- Paddington in Peru - "Let's Prepare for Paddington" (co-writer)

== See also ==
- Tinsel and Marzipan
