= The Divine Comedy (band) =

Irish band fronted by Neil Hannon

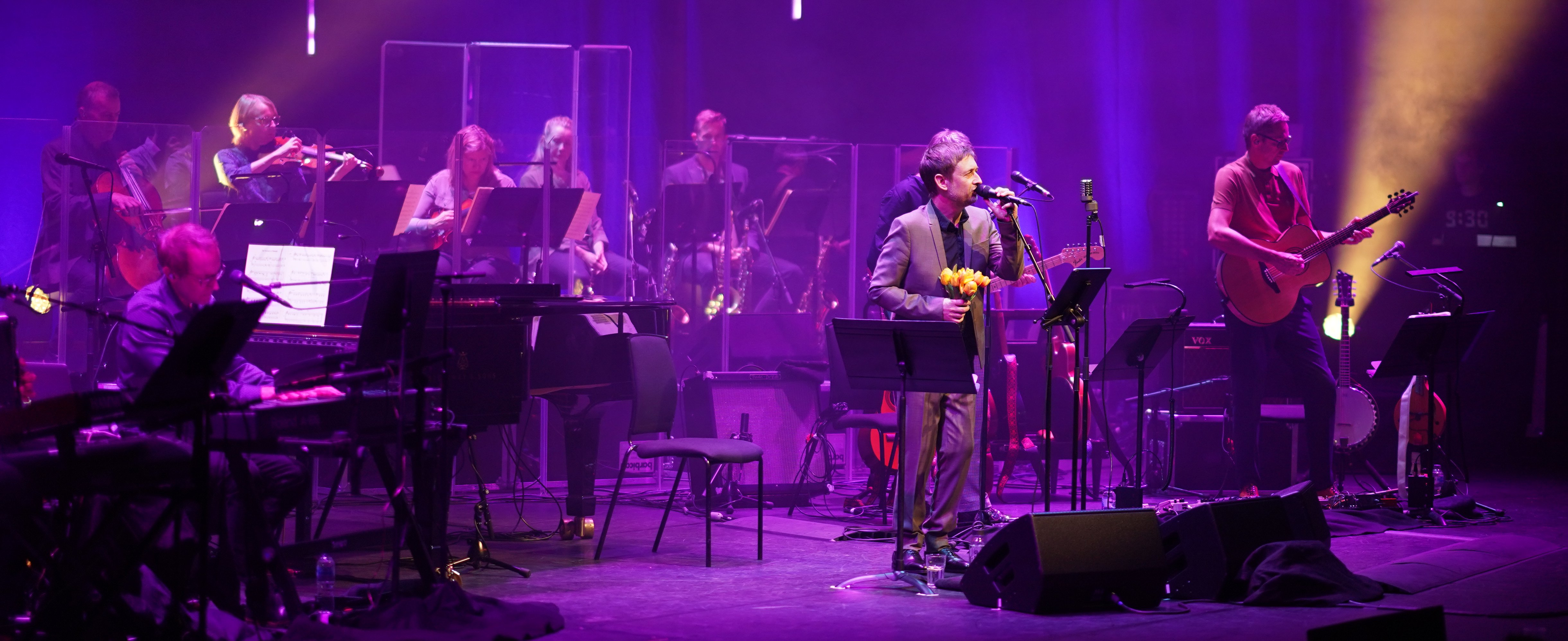
- The Divine Comedy performing at the Barbican in 2022

Background information
- Origin: Enniskillen, Northern Ireland
- Genres: Baroque pop; Britpop; chamber pop
- Years active: 1989–present
- Labels: Setanta; Parlophone; Divine Comedy
- Members: Neil Hannon; Andrew Skeet; Tosh Flood; Simon Little; Ian Watson; Tim Weller
- Past members: John McCullagh; Kevin Traynor; John Allen; Joby Talbot; Ivor Talbot; Bryan Mills; Miguel "Miggy" Barradas; Rob Farrer; Stuart 'Pinkie' Bates
- Website: Official site

The Divine Comedy are a baroque pop band from Northern Ireland, formed in 1989 and fronted by Neil Hannon. Hannon has been the only constant member of the group, playing, in some instances, all of the non-orchestral instrumentation except drums. The band has released 13 studio albums. Between 1996 and 1999, nine singles released by the band made the top 40 of the UK singles chart, including the 1999 top ten hit "National Express".

== History ==
=== The beginning and early success (Fanfare to Promenade) ===
The Divine Comedy were founded in 1989, by Neil Hannon who had been the only member of the band until he was joined by John McCullagh and Kevin Traynor. Their first album, Fanfare for the Comic Muse, enjoyed a minor success and was later deleted. A couple of equally unsuccessful EPs – Timewatch (1991) and Europop (1992) – followed, with newly recruited member John Allen handling lead vocals on some tracks. After the commercial failure of the Europop EP, this line-up soon fell apart.

Hannon, however, was not deterred in his efforts and entered the studio again in March 1993, teaming up with co-producer/drummer Darren Allison, for the recording of Liberation. The record is characterised by a plethora of literary references: "Bernice Bobs Her Hair" recalls a short story by F. Scott Fitzgerald; "Three Sisters" draws upon the play by Anton Chekhov; and "Lucy" is essentially three William Wordsworth poems abridged to music.

Minor success in France enabled Hannon to proceed with his second effort, Promenade, released in 1994. It was heavily driven by classical influences, with Michael Nyman's stylings clearly an inspiration. Hannon himself acknowledged this when he reportedly sent a copy of his new album to the composer, jokingly asking him not to sue. Essentially a concept album about a day spent by two lovers, it also received similar positive feedback to Liberation; however, it was not a major commercial success. Soon after the release of the album, the Divine Comedy went on tour with Tori Amos, supporting her during her European dates.

During that time, Hannon also wrote and performed (with drummer Allison) the theme music for the sitcom Father Ted, he also composed the music for the mock-Eurovision song "My Lovely Horse" that featured in one episode. Hannon resisted widespread requests from fans to release the track as a single for the Christmas market, but it was eventually released in 1999 as the third track on the CD-single "Gin Soaked Boy". This would not be the only time they would be responsible for a TV theme: "In Pursuit of Happiness" was used by the BBC science and technology show Tomorrow's World. Hannon also composed the music for Father Ted co-writer Graham Linehan's Channel 4 comedy series The IT Crowd.

=== The road to fame (Casanova to A Secret History...) ===
The album Casanova (1996), and in particular the single "Something for the Weekend", championed by Chris Evans, then BBC Radio 1 breakfast show DJ and presenter of TFI Friday, led to the band's first major success. Casanova was the third album to be produced by Darren Allison and Neil Hannon, thus completing a trilogy of albums which began with Liberation in 1993. Further singles from Casanova, including "Becoming More Like Alfie" and "The Frog Princess", both of which received some airplay, further cemented the band's reputation.

At the height of their commercial success, the band released A Short Album About Love (a reference to the Krzysztof Kieślowski film A Short Film About Love), recorded live at soundcheck with the Brunel Ensemble in preparation for a concert at the Shepherd's Bush Empire, from which several songs were released as B-sides. It was aptly released on Valentine's Day in 1997. Subsequently, the band contributed a reworking of Noël Coward's "I've Been to a Marvellous Party" to Twentieth-Century Blues: The Songs of Noël Coward, a compilation of covers of the writer's songs, with Hannon affecting a Cowardesque lilt (albeit interspersed with an aggressive electronic musical backing).

The foppish image, but not the suit, was ditched for the more sombre album Fin De Siècle in 1998, although its biggest hit, the jaunty "National Express", belied its more intimate, soul-searching tone. Maintaining the balance between these poles, 1999's Secret History – the Best of The Divine Comedy included re-recordings of Liberation tracks ("The Pop Singer's Fear of the Pollen Count" and "Your Daddy's Car") and two new songs ("Gin-Soaked Boy" and "Too Young to Die") alongside the band's main hits. In the same year, the band also collaborated with Tom Jones on a cover version of Portishead's 'All Mine', featured on his album Reload.

A serious side to the band was also in evidence in 2000's collaboration with Ute Lemper on her album Punishing Kiss, most of which featured The Divine Comedy as Lemper's backing band. Neil Hannon and Joby Talbot also contributed two original songs and an arrangement of Brecht and Weill's "Tango Ballad", whilst Neil Hannon sang two songs ("Tango Ballad", "Split") as duets with Lemper.

=== Post-Setanta (Regeneration to Office Politics) ===
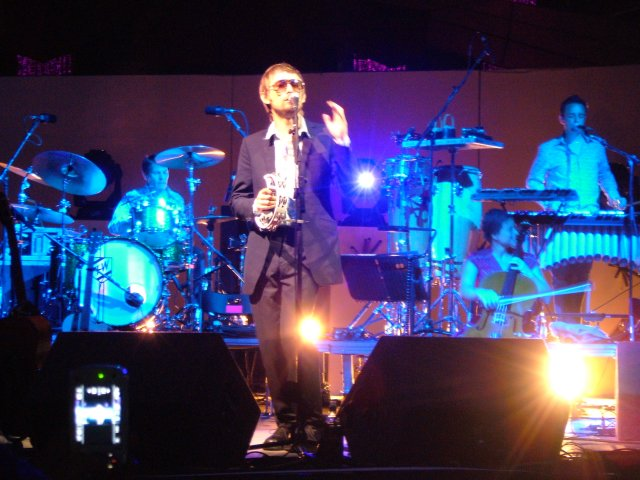
The Divine Comedy performing at the Summer Sundae festival in 2007.

The band performed at V2001 Festival, and their 2001 album Regeneration attempted to remove the band still further from its association with comedy. Hannon hired producer Nigel Godrich to "remake" the band. Hannon ditched the suit and donned a Britrock band image. The album was a greater critical than commercial success, and soon after its release it was announced that the Divine Comedy were splitting up. However, within a year Hannon was touring again with a revised band line-up, playing a series of joint-headline gigs in the United States, United Kingdom and Ireland featuring both the Divine Comedy and Ben Folds.

A new album surfaced in the form of 2004's Absent Friends. The album struck a balance between the occasionally earnest sound of the band's later material and the lighter tone of the more popular releases. 2004 saw two performances featuring The Millennia Ensemble orchestra, one at the London Palladium (which was later released as a live DVD) and one at the Royal Albert Hall. In January 2005, Hannon announced that he had acquired the worldwide copyrights to all of his recorded output with his former record label, Setanta Records. He launched his own record label Divine Comedy Records in order to re-release his 1990s output.

Hannon's ninth album with the Divine Comedy, Victory for the Comic Muse, was released in June 2006. The bulk of the record was recorded over two weeks, much of it live rather than multi-tracked, hence a more spontaneous sound. The album featured Simon Little on bass, Andrew Skeet on keys, Tim Weller on drums and Ian Watson on accordion from the current band.

Hannon also provided vocals for songs on the soundtrack for the film of The Hitchhiker's Guide to the Galaxy released in 2005, working with Joby Talbot, the composer for the film and former Divine Comedy band member. This sci-fi connection continued in late 2006, when he contributed vocals to two tracks – "Song For Ten" and "Love Don't Roam" – on the Doctor Who: Original Television Soundtrack album. In an interview with Bullz-Eye.com, Hannon explained that, "literally, I was asked to add my vocal by the composer of the songs, who writes for the show. And I didn’t feel that I could say no, simply because I spent my childhood watching this programme. It would be just plain wrong to not do it." Hannon also lent his vocals to "Aliens", the last track on the Irish charity album The Cake Sale in 2006, organised by Brian Crosby of Bell X1 and featuring a variety of mainly Irish musicians.

In 2007, the first ten or so seconds of "Tonight We Fly" was used as the ending tune to BBC7's Digi Radio. The song was also used for an advertisement for the Airbus A340 airliner.

Meanwhile, Hannon took part in various projects: he recorded "Perfection As a Hipster", included in the God Help the Girl soundtrack, a soon-to-be-released musical film by Belle and Sebastian frontman Stuart Murdoch as well as the LP The Duckworth Lewis Method, together with Thomas Walsh of Pugwash. In March 2007 Neil Hannon's relationship with Parlophone came to an end.

On 31 May 2010, The Divine Comedy released their tenth album entitled Bang Goes the Knighthood on DC Records. As with Victory for the Comic Muse it was recorded in RAK studios in St John's Wood by Guy Massey and the orchestra was conducted by Andrew Skeet who was the arranger on this album. The album charted at 20 in the first week of release, making it their highest-charting album since Regeneration in 2001. The album itself was preceded by the download-only single "At The Indie Disco".

On 2 September 2016, The Divine Comedy released their eleventh album Foreverland. A live album featuring performances from the 2016–17 Foreverland tour, "Loose Canon", was released digitally on 16 February 2018 after being made available as a CD on the tour.

On 1 April 2019, the Divine Comedy announced a new single "Queuejumper", first played on BBC 6 Music on 3 April. It was followed by the announcement of Office Politics, the band's first double album, which was released on 7 June 2019. The release of "Queuejumper" was followed by the single "Norman and Norma", released on 16 May 2019, and an animated music video for the songs "Infernal Machines" / "You'll Never Work in this Town Again", released on 3 October 2019.

=== Venus, Cupid, Folly, and Time ===
The Divine Comedy celebrated its 30th anniversary by reissuing remastered versions of the band's first nine albums (from Liberation to Bang Goes the Knighthood) on LP and CD. All eleven albums were included in the box set Venus, Cupid, Folly, and Time: 30 Years of the Divine Comedy, released in October 2020. The 24-disc box set consists of 12 albums of two CDs: each with an original remastered album, with a second CD of B-sides, demos, alternate versions, rarities and unreleased material curated by Neil Hannon. The collection includes the original album Fanfare for the Comic Muse, and other pre-Liberation material. The CD release of A Short Album About Love comes with a DVD of A Short Film About A Short Album About Love – a previously unreleased 50-minute film of the Shepherd's Bush Empire concert at which Short Album... was recorded.

Hannon and an eleven-piece ensemble marked the band's 30th anniversary with residencies at The Barbican in London and the Cité de la Musique in Paris. These sold out shows, postponed from September 2020 to September 2022, featured the band playing two of their classic albums, per show, in a five-show residency in each venue.

=== Charmed Life ===
Charmed Life, a double compilation album was released on 4 February 2022. Special limited edition copies included a bonus album, simply named Super Extra Bonus Album. Ten days after its release, Charmed Life claimed the number one spot on the Official Independent Albums Chart. A UK and European tour of Charmed Life followed.

=== Rainy Sunday Afternoon ===
Rainy Sunday Afternoon was released on 19 September 2025. Recorded at Abbey Road Studios in London in the autumn of 2024, it is the band's thirteenth studio album.

Achilles, the first track to be released from the album was inspired by the war poem Achilles in the Trench, by Patrick Shaw-Stewart. The poem was found written onto a blank page of Shaw-Stewart's copy of A Shropshire Lad after his death on the Western Front in 1917. In his song, Hannon interweaves the story of Achilles from the Iliad and Shaw-Stewart's poem and eventual death with Hannon's own sense of mortality.

Two further singles were released ahead of the album release, The Last Time I Saw the Old Man in July 2025 and Invisible Thread in September 2025. The video for the latter features Irish actor Ardal O'Hanlon.

The Divine Comedy embarked on a 16 date tour of the UK in October 2025 including two performances, on 11 and 12 October 2025, at the Barbican Hall in London. These were the band's first appearances at the venue since a sold-out five-night retrospective in 2022.

== Band members ==
The band has mostly consisted only of Neil Hannon, but has also included:

- Tosh Flood: guitar
- Simon Little: bass
- Andrew Skeet: piano
- Ian Watson: accordion, keyboards
- Tim Weller: drums, percussion
- Rosie Tompsett: violin

=== Previous members ===
- Bryan Mills: bass guitar
- Ivor Talbot: guitar
- Joby Talbot: piano
- Miguel "Miggy" Barradas: drums
- Rob Farrer: percussion
- Stuart 'Pinkie' Bates: Hammond organ, accordion

== Discography ==
=== Studio albums ===
- Fanfare for the Comic Muse (1990)
- Liberation (1993)
- Promenade (1994)
- Casanova (1996)
- A Short Album About Love (1997)
- Fin de Siècle (1998)
- Regeneration (2001)
- Absent Friends (2004)
- Victory for the Comic Muse (2006)
- Bang Goes the Knighthood (2010)
- Foreverland (2016)
- Office Politics (2019)
- Rainy Sunday Afternoon (2025)
