= Hands on Approach =

- Origin: Setúbal, Portugal
- Genre: Pop rock
- Years active: 1996–present
- Labels: Universal/Polygram; Metrosonic Records; Farol
- Members: Rui David; Joao Luís; Sérgio André Mendes; João Coelho; Pedro "indy"

Hands on Approach are a Portuguese pop rock band based in Setúbal. Band members are: João Luís (bass), Rui David (vocals/acoustic guitar) and Sérgio Miendes (lead guitars).

== Career ==
In early 1996 the band's vocalist, Rui David, was playing acoustic guitar and singing on a beach in the Algarve (south of Portugal) when a DJ from a national radio station heard him. He enjoyed the songs and invited Rui to play them live on his late night program. After that, and for the next 3 years, the band did the usual circuit of live performances, music festivals and making demos. In 1999 Universal/PolyGram signed up the band.

The band’s debut album, called Blown, was released in March, 1999 and sold just below platinum. The first single to be taken from the album was My Wonder Moon and it remained in first place of the Portuguese airplay charts for almost two months. In 2004 this song was still on the top 20 airplay. The second single, Silent Speech, which had a considerable airplay as well, was the opening track of the album. The band was 1999's revelation in the Portuguese music scene and toured intensively, playing 90 concerts in the first 8 months after the release of the album. A Brazilian edition of Blown was released, with an extra CD recorded live.

November 2000 saw the release of their second album, Moving Spirits, which gathered substantial airplay (first single was The Endless Road) and took the band to the road for another series of well recognized performances around the country. This time, another musician joined them, (well established composer/keyboard player, Hugo Novo). Both records were recorded and produced by Darren Allison, who has also worked with Bôa, Skunk Anansie, Spiritualized and The Divine Comedy.

After 4 years of recording and touring, the band felt prepared for bigger challenges. That led them to leave Universal for an independent label, Metrosonic Records. With the company's full support and commitment to the band's goal of becoming an international act, Hands on Approach started working, in October 2002, on their third album which took them 5 months of hiding on the surroundings of São Pedro do Sul, where the label's own studio is situated.

The album Groovin' on Monster's eye-balls was released in September 2005 and the first single to come out was A chance, a song that garnered many new fans by appearing on the soundtrack of an audience-leader TV show series called Morangos com Açucar. After the release of the album, the band was confident that they had done a good job, but the massive hit that turned their second single, If you give up the most played song of the year in Portuguese radio, exceeded their expectations. The song is a powerful ballad sang in duet with singer Treana Morris. The song remained in the top 20 for 6 months and confirmed Hands on Approach as an established and one of the most prolific acts in the Portuguese music scene. Last year the band was on the road for 3 months and finished recording an acoustic DVD that marks their 10th anniversary.

== Discography ==
=== Studio albums ===
- Blown (1999)
- Moving Spirits (2000)
- Groovin' on Monsters eye-balls (2005)
- High And Above (2010)
