= Jacques (band) =

- Genres: Alternative rock
- Years active: 1997–2001
- Labels: Setanta, Acaruela
- Past members: Anthony Reynolds; Matthew Scott; Ruth Gottlieb

Jacques were a British alternative rock band, formed as a side project by Anthony Reynolds and Matthew Scott, singer and guitarist with Jack. They released two albums and several EPs between 1997 and 2001.

== History ==
Their first album, How to Make Love Volume 1, produced by Momus and recorded in seven days, was released in 1997 to mixed and extreme reviews. The band, at this point consisting of Reynolds, Scott and violinist Ruth Gottlieb (who would also play on Jack's The Jazz Age) played shows in the UK and Paris in support of the album. Ned Raggett of AllMusic remarked, "Jacques makes an elegantly dissipated debut with How to Make Love, Vol. 1."

Their rapid-fire approach to recording continued with the Five Finger Discount EP, a collaboration with poet Kirk Lane, recorded over Christmas 1997.

Second album To Stars, recorded in 1999 and released the following year, featured a more expansive sound and was received more warmly by critics. Produced by former U2 engineer Rob Kirwaun, it featured contributions by Bryan Mills of the Divine Comedy, among others.

A mooted third album, Happiness, was abandoned when the band were dropped by their record label, Setanta.

They went on to release a pair of EPs in 2001 for the Spanish Acaruela label, but have been inactive since.

== Discography ==
=== Albums ===
- How to Make Love Volume 1 (Setanta, 1997)
- To Stars (Setanta, 2000)

=== Singles / EPs ===
- "Five Finger Discount" (I Records, 1997)
- Faster Than Beauty EP (Mistemacbari, 1999)
- "Blue Party" (Setanta, 2000)
- Roses for Ashes EP (Acaruela, 2001)
- Romantic EP (Acaruela, 2001)
