= The Race of a Thousand Camels =

Studio album by Bôa
- Released: 1 July 1998
- Genre: Alternative rock
- Length: 45:38
- Label: Polystar
- Producers: Neil Walsh; Darren Allison; Bôa

Bôa chronology
Duvet (1997)	The Race of a Thousand Camels (1998)	Tall Snake (1999)

The Race of a Thousand Camels is the debut album by the English rock band Bôa released on 1 July 1998. During the recording of this album the band consisted of Alex Caird, Ben Henderson, Jasmine Rodgers, Steve Rodgers, Lee Sullivan and Paul Turrell. It was later reissued as Twilight in 2001, adding two new tracks and an acoustic version of "Duvet".

The third track, "Duvet", became popular after being used as the opening theme song to the anime series Serial Experiments Lain.

== Track listing ==
All tracks written by Bôa.

1. "Fool" – 5:06
2. "Twilight" – 3:48
3. "Duvet" – 3:23
4. "Rain" – 3:55
5. "Elephant" – 3:54
6. "Scoring" – 3:49
7. "Deeply" – 4:35
8. "One Day" – 2:41
9. "Welcome" – 5:06
10. "For Jasmine" – 5:18
11. "Anna María" – 4:03

== Personnel ==
- Alex Caird – bass guitars
- Ben Henderson – electric and acoustic guitars, saxophone, percussion
- Jasmine Rodgers – lead vocals, acoustic guitars, percussion
- Steve Rodgers – electric and acoustic guitars, vocals
- Lee Sullivan – drums, percussion, keyboards
- Paul Turrell – keyboards, strings arrangements, percussion, electric guitars
