= Lee Sullivan =

British drummer

- Born: Lee Terrence Sullivan; 6 March 1971 (age 55); London, England
- Genres: Alternative rock, indie rock
- Occupations: Musician, songwriter, record producer
- Years active: 1990–present
- Labels: Geneon, Bôa Recordings, Moon Struck Monkey
- Website: www.facebook.com/moonstruckmonkey

Lee Terrence Sullivan (born 6 March 1971) is an English drummer for the London-based alternative rock band Bôa. Lee is the son of Terence Sullivan, the drummer for the rock band Renaissance and his wife, Christine Sullivan. He plays drums, piano and percussion. At the age of seven, Lee first performed with father on stage at one of Renaissance's concerts at the Apollo. He later joined the band Chapter VI. The band produced a single track called "The King of Comedy" and an EP called Bucket Chemistry.

He joined Bôa in 1994 during which time he worked with producers Darren Allison and Neil Walsh. However, in later years, the band decided to form their own independent label called Bôa Recordings. As part of Bôa Recordings, Sullivan was able to put his sound production talents to good use and co-produced the album Get There (2005) with the band and Kevin Wood in a Southampton studio. In 2004, he branched out and worked on his father's new project, called Renaissant. On the Renaissant album, South of Winter, he played keyboards on a number of tracks and helped produce. Alex Caird (bass guitar from Bôa) also played on the album.

In 2013, Lee released his first solo album titled Out and About. Alex Caird performed on two tracks. The album brought in new vocal talents; Sara Garvey is the featured vocal talent on "Looking Back" and Chris Thomas performs on "Give a Little Sugar". Other performers include Kristian Sullivan, Lee's brother, on guitar. The album was released by Moon Struck Monkey, Lee's independent record label and distributed through CD Baby.

== Discography ==
- Duvet (1997)
- The Race of a Thousand Camels (1998)
- Serial Experiments Lain OST 'Duvet' (1998)
- Tall Snake EP (1999)
- Duvet on 20th Anniversary Of Polystar Collection Vol.1 Female Vocal Love Songs (2000)
- Twilight (2001)
- Serial Experiment Lain Soundtrack: Cyberia Mix 'Duvet remix' (2003)
- South of Winter (2004)
- Get There (2005)
- Out and About (2013)
