= The Pop Singer's Fear of the Pollen Count =

Single by the Divine Comedy

from the album Liberation
- A-side: "Lucy"
- Released: 16 August 1993
- Genre: Britpop
- Length: 4:20
- Label: Setanta
- Songwriter: Neil Hannon
- Producers: Jon Jacobs; Neil Hannon

The Divine Comedy singles chronology
"The Pop Singer's Fear of the Pollen Count" (1993)	"Something for the Weekend" (1996)

"The Pop Singer's Fear of the Pollen Count" is a song by the Divine Comedy. Written by Neil Hannon, it was originally recorded for the Liberation album and was issued as the B-side of "Lucy".

== The Best of the Divine Comedy version ==
"The Pop Singer's Fear of the Pollen Count"
- Single release

Single by the Divine Comedy

from the album A Secret History... The Best of the Divine Comedy
- B-side: "With Whom to Dance"; "Eric the Gardener (acoustic)"; "This Side of Paradise"; "Vapour Trail"; "Jackie"
- Released: 9 August 1999
- Genre: Britpop
- Length: 3:53
- Label: Setanta
- Songwriter: Neil Hannon
- Producers: Jon Jacobs; Neil Hannon

The Divine Comedy singles chronology
"Something for the Weekend" (1996)	"The Pop Singer's Fear of the Pollen Count" (1999)	"Gin Soaked Boy" (1999)

The song was re-recorded for the 1999 compilation album A Secret History... The Best of the Divine Comedy. It was released as a single from that album and peaked at number 17 in the UK singles chart and number 24 on the Irish singles chart.

=== Track listing ===
All tracks written by Neil Hannon; except where indicated.

CD single #1

Setanta Records / SETCDA070

No.	Title	Writer(s)	Length
1.	"The Pop Singer's Fear of the Pollen Count"		3:53
2.	"With Whom to Dance"	Stephin Merritt	2:39
3.	"Eric the Gardener (acoustic)"		4:34

CD single #2

Setanta Records / SETCDB070

No.	Title	Writer(s)	Length
1.	"The Pop Singer's Fear of the Pollen Count"		3:53
2.	"This Side of Paradise"		3:56
3.	"Vapour Trail"	Ride	3:23

Cassette single

Setanta Records / SETMC070

No.	Title	Writer(s)	Length
1.	"The Pop Singer's Fear of the Pollen Count"
2.	"Jackie"	Jacques Brel, Gérard Jouannest, Mort Schuman

== Critical reception ==
In an AllMusic album review of Liberation, critic Ned Raggett said the song was influenced by the English rock band XTC. He also noted is "slipping in as much wry humor as he does gentle pathos and reflection – plenty of all three."
