= A Secret History... The Best of the Divine Comedy =

Greatest hits album by the Divine Comedy
- Released: 30 August 1999
- Genre: Orchestral pop
- Length: 70:53
- Label: Setanta
- Producer: Various

The Divine Comedy chronology
Fin de Siècle (1998)	A Secret History... The Best of the Divine Comedy (1999)	Regeneration (2001)

Singles from A Secret History... The Best of the Divine Comedy
- 1. "The Pop Singer's Fear of the Pollen Count" Released: 9 August 1999; 2. "Gin Soaked Boy" Released: 1 November 1999

A Secret History... The Best of the Divine Comedy is a greatest hits compilation album by Northern Irish chamber pop band the Divine Comedy, released in 1999 by Setanta Records.

== Release ==
Professional ratings
Review scores
Source	Rating
AllMusic	4/5 stars
MusicOMH	(positive)

The album was the last to be released by the band on the Setanta label and features a collection of singles and best-known songs from their previous five studio albums. A new recording of "The Pop Singer's Fear of the Pollen Count" and a remixed version of "Your Daddy's Car"—both originally from the band's 1993 album Liberation—were included, along with two new tracks: "Gin Soaked Boy" and "Too Young to Die". The band's recording of Noël Coward's "I've Been to a Marvellous Party", from the tribute album Twentieth-Century Blues: The Songs of Noël Coward, was also included.

A limited edition was available with an accompanying hard-back book and extra CD of "rarities". The book features Kevin Westenberg photographs taken from previous album photo shoots, interspersed with the recollections of people who had worked closely with the band, including Graham Linehan and Sean Hughes.

The additional CD, Rarities, features a full disc of rare, live and demo recordings, including cover versions of tracks by David Bowie, Talk Talk and Kraftwerk. Of special interest is the inclusion of "Soul Destroyer", a demo of a track from sessions for the band's debut album, Fanfare for the Comic Muse, an album which had previously been all-but ignored from the back catalogue.

== Track listing ==
All tracks are written by Neil Hannon, except where otherwise indicated.

No.	Title	Writer(s)	Original release	Length
1.	"National Express"		Fin de Siècle	5:06
2.	"Something for the Weekend"		Casanova	4:20
3.	"Everybody Knows (Except You)"		A Short Album About Love	3:50
4.	"Generation Sex"		Fin de Siècle	3:30
5.	"Becoming More Like Alfie"		Casanova	3:00
6.	"The Summerhouse"		Promenade	4:14
7.	"Your Daddy's Car" (Remix)		Liberation	4:03
8.	"The Pop Singer's Fear of the Pollen Count" (Re-recording)		Liberation	3:54
9.	"The Frog Princess"		Casanova	5:13
10.	"Gin Soaked Boy"		Previously unreleased	5:03
11.	"Lucy"		Liberation	4:39
12.	"Songs of Love"		Casanova	3:23
13.	"In Pursuit of Happiness"		A Short Album About Love	3:29
14.	"I've Been to a Marvellous Party"	Noël Coward	Twentieth-Century Blues: The Songs of Noël Coward	3:42
15.	"The Certainty of Chance"	Neil Hannon, Joby Talbot	Fin de Siècle	6:12
16.	"Too Young to Die"		Previously unreleased	4:20
17.	"Tonight We Fly"		Promenade	2:57

Limited Edition Rarities CD

All tracks are written by Neil Hannon, except where otherwise indicated.

No.	Title	Writer(s)	Length
1.	"Bernice Bobs Her Hair" (Live at Her Majesty's Theatre, London '94)		3:36
2.	"Bleak Landscape" (Home Demo, London '93)		3:45
3.	"The Booklovers" (Live at Théâtre de Ville, Paris '94)		4:13
4.	"The Certainty of Chance" (Home Demo, London '97)		3:28
5.	"Commuter Love" (Live at Shepherds Bush Empire, London '98)		5:02
6.	"Dear Lord and Father of Mankind" (Live TV, Belfast '98)	Traditional	3:52
7.	"A Drinking Song" (Live at the Olympia, Dublin '94)		3:39
8.	"The Frog Princess" (Live at Shepherds Bush Empire, London '96)		6:29
9.	"Generation Sex" (Home Demo, London '97)		3:43
10.	"Life on Mars?" (Live at Théâtre National de Bretagne, Rennes '98 with Yann Tiersen)	David Bowie	3:12
11.	"Life's What You Make It" (Acoustic Session – Elephant Studios, London '93)	Mark Hollis, Tim Friese-Greene	2:53
12.	"The Model" (Live in Düsseldorf '94)	Ralf Hütter, Karl Bartos, Emil Schult	3:56
13.	"National Express" (Live somewhere in a large field '99)		4:32
14.	"Painting the Forth Bridge" (Home Demo, Fivemiletown '93)		4:05
15.	"Queen of the South" (Acoustic Session – Elephant Studios, London '93)		4:03
16.	"The Summerhouse" (Live at Théâtre de Ville, Paris '94)		4:38
17.	"Soul Destroyer" (Studio Demo, Banbridge '89)		1:59
18.	"Your Daddy's Car" (Home Demo, Fivemiletown '91/'92)		4:04
19.	"[Unlisted track] "Moon River"" (Home Demo, Fivemiletown, 1991)	Johnny Mercer, Henry Mancini	1:25

- "Painting the Forth Bridge" is an early version of the Casanova track "Middle Class Heroes", featuring completely different lyrics.

== Charts ==
Chart (1999)	Peak position
Irish Albums (IRMA)	2
Scottish Albums (OCC)	6
UK Albums (OCC)	3
UK Independent Albums (OCC)	1

== Certifications ==
Region	Certification	Certified units/sales
United Kingdom (BPI)	Gold	100,000^{^}
^{^} Shipments figures based on certification alone.
