= Tall Snake =

- Cover art, featuring Lain Iwakura from Serial Experiments Lain

EP by Bôa
- Released: 28 April 1999
- Recorded: 1998
- Genre: Alternative rock; pop-rock
- Length: 22:04
- Label: Polystar
- Producer: Neil Walsh; Darren Allison; Bôa

Bôa chronology
The Race of a Thousand Camels (1998)	Tall Snake (1999)	Twilight (2001)

Tall Snake is the debut EP by the English rock band Bôa. It was released on 28 April 1999. It contains three versions of the single "Duvet". They include the original version, an acoustic version, and an electronic version mixed by DJ Wasei. It also includes the tracks "Two Steps" and "Little Miss". During the recording of this EP the band consisted of Alex Caird, Ben Henderson, Jasmine Rodgers, Steve Rodgers, Lee Sullivan and Paul Turrell.

== Personnel ==
- Alex Caird – bass guitar
- Ben Henderson – electric and acoustic guitars, saxophone, percussion
- Jasmine Rodgers – lead vocals, acoustic guitars, percussion
- Steve Rodgers – electric and acoustic guitars, vocals
- Lee Sullivan – drums, percussion
- Paul Turrell – keyboards, strings arrangements, percussion, electric guitars
