= Yamaha TX16W =

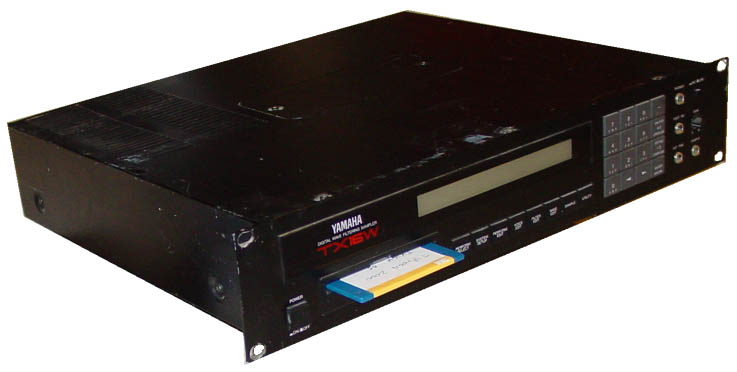
- Yamaha TX16W
- Manufacturer: Yamaha
- Dates: 1988

Technical specifications
- Polyphony: 16
- Timbrality: 8
- Synthesis type: Digital Sample-based Subtractive
- Filter: Digital filter
- Storage memory: 1.5MB (up to 6MB) RAM; 720kB 3.5" floppy disk

Input/output
- Keyboard: n/a
- Left-hand control: n/a
- External control: MIDI

The Yamaha TX16W is a rack-mount sampler sound module made by Yamaha.

The TX16W has 12-bit sound with up to 50 kHz mono and 33 kHz stereo sampling. Its filter is digital, allowing 17 different types, with one filter/type per voice. On the rear along with a regular stereo output, there are 8 individual outputs. Samples are stored on 720kB 3.5" floppy disks. It shipped with 1.5MB of RAM but is expandable up to 6MB. The TX16W uses a Motorola 68000 processor.

The operating system is loaded from disk. There is an alternate OS for the sampler called Typhoon, created by a Swedish organisation.

A free software emulation ("Cyclone") was released in 2013 by Sonic Charge (developed by Magnus Lidström, who was behind the original Typhoon OS).

== Notable users ==
- Darren Allison of The Divine Comedy (Casanova Album)
- Aphex Twin
- Oval
