= Promenade (The Divine Comedy album) =

Studio album by the Divine Comedy
- Released: 28 March 1994
- Recorded: October 1993
- Genre: Chamber pop
- Length: 45:28
- Label: Setanta
- Producers: Neil Hannon; Darren Allison

The Divine Comedy chronology
Liberation (1993)	Promenade (1994)	Casanova (1996)

Promenade is the third album by Northern Irish chamber pop band the Divine Comedy, released in 1994 on Setanta Records.

== Background ==
=== Recording ===
Promenade, like its predecessor, Liberation, was recorded by frontman Neil Hannon and co-producer Darren Allison, with the addition of a string quartet, as well as oboe/cor anglais courtesy of Joby Talbot, thus marking Talbot's first appearance with the band. Talbot would go on to become the arranger for most of the Divine Comedy's post-Casanova work, even co-writing two of the band's songs.

=== Concept ===
One recurring element in Promenade is water, mentioned in one way or another in the songs "Bath", "A Seafood Song", "Geronimo", "The Summerhouse", "Neptune's Daughter" and "Tonight We Fly". The North Sea, itself, even plays a part in the album: producer Darren Allison made field recordings at North Blyth and Druridge Bay on the Northumberland Coast, which can be heard at the beginning of "Bath" and again in "Neptune's Daughter".

Another recurring element is gods from Greek and Roman mythology: specifically, Aphrodite ("Bath"), Mercury ("Going Downhill Fast") and Neptune ("Neptune's Daughter").

== Composition ==
Promenade is "a concept album about two lovers at the sea". The album's style is even more classical-influenced than its predecessor, Liberation. The string arrangements are reminiscent of the works of Michael Nyman, with whom the Divine Comedy would later collaborate. Hannon once said that after attending one of Nyman's performances he went up to the composer, handed him a copy of Promenade, and jokingly said, "You can sue me if you like." Years later, Nyman said he did not remember the incident, but said he felt more "flattered than ripped off."

=== References ===
Promenade is even more overtly literary than Liberation. It opens with a quote from Isaac Watts' hymn "Our God, Our Help in Ages Past" and ends with a quote from John Dryden's translation of one of Horace's odes (which is also sung as the chorus of "The Booklovers"). "The Booklovers" is a list of over seventy different authors. "When The Lights Go Out All Over Europe" also begins with a quote from James Joyce's poem, "The Twilight Turns".

References to French New Wave cinema occur in two of the songs. "When the Lights Go Out All Over Europe" alludes to François Truffaut's Jules et Jim, contains excerpts of dialogue from Jean-Luc Godard's À Bout de Souffle and contains the line "and when she asks for his ambition, Jean-Pierre replies 'My mission is to become eternal and to die'", describing a scene in À Bout de Souffle in which a novelist character played by Jean-Pierre Melville replies "devenir immortel et puis, mourir". This song also contains a reference to Éric Rohmer's Claire's Knee. "The Booklovers" contains the line "Tu connais William Faulkner?", also a quote from À Bout de Souffle.

The title of "When the Lights Go Out All Over Europe" alludes to the famous World War I quote "The lamps are going out all over Europe" by British Foreign Secretary Sir Edward Grey.

== Reception ==
Professional ratings
Review scores
Source	Rating
AllMusic	4/5 stars
Q Magazine	4/5 stars
NME	(positive)
Hot Press	(positive)
Mojo	(positive)
Encyclopedia of Popular Music	5/5 stars

Neil Hannon used to send all of his albums to American singer-songwriter Scott Walker, of whom Hannon is a big fan. After Hannon sent Walker a copy of Promenade, Walker sent him a letter back, stating that he particularly liked "The Booklovers".

== Track listing ==
All songs written and arranged by Neil Hannon.

No.	Title	Length
1.	"Bath"	4:10
2.	"Going Downhill Fast"	2:33
3.	"The Booklovers"	5:51
4.	"A Seafood Song"	3:29
5.	"Geronimo"	1:53
6.	"Don't Look Down"	4:48
7.	"When the Lights Go Out All Over Europe"	3:29
8.	"The Summerhouse"	4:15
9.	"Neptune's Daughter"	4:49
10.	"A Drinking Song"	4:37
11.	"Ten Seconds to Midnight"	2:10
12.	"Tonight We Fly"	3:01
13.	"Ode to the Man" (unlisted track)	0:15

2020 Remaster Bonus Disc Apropos of Promenade

All tracks are written by Neil Hannon, except where otherwise indicated.

No.	Title	Writer(s)	Original release	Length
1.	"Ten Seconds to Midnight" (alternate version - home recording)			2:20
2.	"Assume the Goldsmith" (home recording)			5:14
3.	"When the Lights Go Out All Over Europe" (recorded live at the Theatre De La Ville, Paris, 1994)			3:36
4.	"Tell Me What's Wrong" (home recording)			2;15
5.	"Life's What You Make It" (recorded live at Elephant Studios, London, 1993)	Mark Hollis, Tim Friese-Greene	A Secret History... The Best of the Divine Comedy	2:51
6.	"Lost Prom Jam" (home recording)			1:42
7.	"Neptune's Daughter" (demo - home recording)			4:55
8.	"Going Downhill Fast" (instrumental)			2:32
9.	"The Booklovers" (demo - home recording)			4:56
10.	"The Bright Lights of Ealing" (home recording)			1:47
11.	"Bath" (alternate version - home recording)			3:47
12.	"The Summerhouse" (early idea - home recording)			1:18
13.	"The Summerhouse" (recorded at the Theatre De La Ville, Paris, 1994)		A Secret History... The Best of the Divine Comedy	4:34
14.	"When the Lights Go Out All Over Europe" (early idea - home recording)			2:44
15.	"A Woman of the World" (Promenade-style demo - home recording)			2:25
16.	"Geronimo" (with Yann Tiersen, recorded by Radio France for Bernard Lenoir's The Black Session on France Inter, 1998)		"Gin Soaked Boy"	1:47
17.	"Don't Look Down" (demo - home recording)			4:59
18.	"A Drinking Song" (recorded at the Shepherd's Bush Empire, London, 1996)		"Everybody Knows (Except You)"	4:34
19.	"Only for Tonight" (home recording)			2:57
20.	"Tonight We Fly" (demo - home recording)			3:03

== Personnel ==
Personnel per booklet.

Musicians

- Natalie Box – 1st violin
- Catherine Browning – 2nd violin
- Jessamy Boyd – viola (tracks 1–3, 7–9 and 12)
- Alan Simpson – viola (tracks 4–6 and 10)
- Chris Worsey – cello
- Joby Talbot – oboe, saxophone, cor anglais
- Darren Allison – drums, percussion
- Neil Hannon – everything else

Production

- Darren Allison – engineer, mixing, producer
- Neil Hannon – producer
- Pascal Giovetti – assistance
- Rowan Stigner – assistance
- Ian Mcfarlane – assistance
- Kevin Westenberg – all photography

== Samples ==
- The sample at the beginning of "The Booklovers" features Audrey Hepburn from the 1957 film Funny Face.
- Further samples during "The Booklovers" feature Graham Chapman ("Good evening", "names that will live forever"), Michael Palin ("London is so beautiful at this time of year") and John Cleese ("Oh, it makes me mad") from the third and sixth episodes of series 1 of Monty Python's Flying Circus.
- The sample in "When the Lights Go Out All Over Europe" is from the 1960 film À Bout de Souffle.
- The sample in "Ode to the Man" features Micheál Mac Liammóir quoting John Dryden's English translation of one of Horace's odes (Imitation of Horace, book III, ode 29, vv. 65-72) in the 1963 film Tom Jones.
