= Phonemic imagery =

Phonemic imagery refers to the processing of thoughts as words rather than as symbols or other images. It is sometimes referred to as the equivalent of inner speech or covert speech, and is occasionally treated as a distinct phenomenon that is separate from, but closely related to, other forms of internal speech.

Phonemic imagery is a part of the philosophy of consciousness rather than linguistics as it is considered an internal phenomenon of consciousness observed through reflection rather than amenable to empirical observation.
