= Pioneer Soundtracks =

Studio album by Jack
- Released: 24 June 1996
- Recorded: 1995
- Studio: Blackwing Studios, London
- Genre: Alternative rock; chamber pop
- Length: 47:36
- Label: Too Pure
- Producer: Peter Walsh

Jack chronology
Pioneer Soundtracks (1996)	The Jazz Age (1998)

Singles from Pioneer Soundtracks
- 1. "Wintercomesummer" Released: 25 January 1996; 2. "White Jazz" Released: 4 April 1996; 3. "Biography of a First Son" Released: 17 May 1996

Professional ratings
Review scores
Source	Rating
AllMusic	4.5/5 stars
The Guardian	4/4 stars
Melody Maker	(positive)
The Philadelphia Inquirer	3/4 stars
Record Collector	3/5 stars

Pioneer Soundtracks is the debut album by the British alternative rock band Jack, released in June 1996. It was produced by Peter Walsh, who had previously worked with Scott Walker.

Despite excellent reviews and extensive touring in both the United Kingdom and Europe sales were disappointing. Three tracks from the album - "Wintercomessummer", "White Jazz", and "Biography Of A First Son" - were released as singles but failed to pick up significant airplay.

A belated 'Tenth Anniversary Edition' featuring an additional CD of alternative versions, B-sides and live tracks was released on Spinney Records in March 2007.

== Track listing ==
All tracks are written by Anthony Reynolds and Matthew Scott; except where indicated

No.	Title	Writer(s)	Length
1.	".... Of Lights"		7:21
2.	"Wintercomesummer"		3:37
3.	"White Jazz"		2:43
4.	"Biography of a First Son"		3:09
5.	"Filthy Names"		4:49
6.	"I Didn't Mean It Marie"		5:11
7.	"F.U."	Reynolds	7:40
8.	"Dress You in Mourning"		7:19
9.	"Hope Is a Liar"		5:49

2007 Tenth Anniversary Edition: CD2 bonus tracks
No.	Title	Writer(s)	Length
1.	"Kid Stardust"		5:06
2.	"I Was Drunk in the Underworld"		2:42
3.	"White Jazz (version)"		2:44
4.	"Wintercomesummer (version)"		3:39
5.	"The Seventh Day"		5:07
6.	"Biography of a First Son (demo)"		3:14
7.	"Hey! Josephine..."		3:16
8.	"The Ballad of Misery And Heaven"	Reynolds	2:15
9.	"Ballad for a Beautiful Blonde Eye"	Reynolds	3:26
10.	"José's Dream (live studio outtake)"		2:27
11.	"F.U. (live in Paris)"	Reynolds	7:09
12.	".... Of Lights (live in Paris)"		7:12
13.	"White Jazz (live in Paris)"		2:59
14.	"Saturday's Plan (live in Paris)"		7:29
15.	"Nico's Children (live in Paris)"		7:04
16.	"Steamin' (live in Paris)"		5:10
