= Casanova (The Divine Comedy album) =

Studio album by the Divine Comedy
- Released: 29 April 1996
- Recorded: June 1995 – January 1996
- Genre: Britpop; orchestral pop
- Length: 51:52
- Label: Setanta
- Producer: Darren Allison; Neil Hannon

The Divine Comedy chronology
Promenade (1994)	Casanova (1996)	A Short Album About Love (1997)

Singles from Casanova
- 1. "Something for the Weekend" Released: 17 June 1996; 2. "Becoming More Like Alfie" Released: 12 August 1996; 3. "The Frog Princess" Released: 4 November 1996

Casanova is the fourth studio album by Northern Irish chamber pop band the Divine Comedy. It was released in 1996 by Setanta Records and was the band's commercial breakthrough. It was certified Gold in the UK in July 1997, aided by the release of the album's first single, "Something for the Weekend", which reached No. 13 on the charts. Two other singles released from the album, "Becoming More Like Alfie" and "The Frog Princess", charted at No. 27 and No. 15, respectively.

== Composition ==
Treble writer A.T. Bossenger wrote that, with Casanova, Divine Comedy frontman Neil Hannon "started going for a more straightforward pop tone as the base for his songwriting", resulting in the album having a more Britpop flow to it. Its central theme is sex, around which all songs on the album centre, except "The Dogs and the Horses", which is the last song on the album and whose theme is death. Jeremy Lee of ABC News considered that this record brought Neil Hannon "closer to the orchestral pop sound he'd been dreaming of."

Casanova exemplifies the influence of American singer-songwriter Scott Walker: "Through a Long & Sleepless Night" shares the same title as a track from Walker's first solo album, while "The Dogs and the Horses" is reminiscent of the chamber pop musical style of Walker's first four solo albums. Two of Casanova's songs were originally composed by Hannon as potential theme tunes for the 1995 sitcom Father Ted: Hannon's first attempt was rejected, and he reworked it to become "A Woman of the World"; his second attempt was accepted and used as the theme for the series, but was later reworked as "Songs of Love", eschewing the original version's guitar for harpsichord.

== Recording ==
Casanova had the longest recording period of any Divine Comedy album up to that point and consequently had a higher budget. Setanta was able to indulge Neil Hannon's desire because of the success of Edwyn Collins' hit single "A Girl Like You".

Casanova featured more musicians than on the band's previous two albums, Liberation and Promenade, but like those two albums, Neil Hannon performed the majority of the instrumental parts himself, with co-producer/drummer Darren Allison directing proceedings. The album's closing track, "The Dogs and the Horses", recorded at Abbey Road Studios, features a large orchestral ensemble which includes future members of the live band, namely Joby Talbot, Stuart 'Pinkie' Bates, Grant Gordon, and Bryan Mills. Talbot was beginning to play an increasingly important role in the band; he arranged and orchestrated "The Dogs and the Horses," and he co-arranged "Theme from Casanova" with Hannon.

== Legacy ==
Professional ratings
Review scores
Source	Rating
AllMusic	4.5/5 stars
Dotmusic	90/100
Entertainment Weekly	A
The Guardian	4/5 stars
Q	4/5 stars
Rolling Stone	4/5 stars
Select	4/5
Wall of Sound	83/100

The album's sixth track, "Songs of Love", made its debut on the popular Channel 4 sitcom Father Ted, officially remaining the show's theme song, as heard in its opening titles and end credits. The song was later covered by Ben Folds on his EP Sunny 16 in 2003 and Peter Bjorn and John as part of Under the Radar's Covers of Covers album in 2022.

The album was included in the 2010 edition of the book 1001 Albums You Must Hear Before You Die. In 2014, NME included the album in its list of "30 Glorious Britpop Albums That Deserve a Reissue Pronto," saying "Gawky Neil Hannon as smooth loverman was a conceit that actually worked and it produced two of Britpop's least obvious classics in the hilarious Cold Comfort Farm-inspired tale of 'Something for the Weekend' and the movie fantasy of 'Becoming More Like Alfie'."

== Track listing ==
All songs written and arranged by Neil Hannon, except "Theme From Casanova", arranged by Hannon and Joby Talbot; "The Dogs & the Horses" arranged and orchestrated by Talbot.

No.	Title	Length
1.	"Something for the Weekend"	4:19
2.	"Becoming More Like Alfie"	2:59
3.	"Middle-Class Heroes"	5:26
4.	"In & Out of Paris & London"	3:27
5.	"Charge"	5:27
6.	"Songs of Love"	3:26
7.	"The Frog Princess"	5:13
8.	"A Woman of the World"	4:12
9.	"Through a Long & Sleepless Night"	6:12
10.	"Theme from Casanova"	5:51
11.	"The Dogs & the Horses"	5:14

2020 Bonus Disc

1. Hannon's Game

2. Birds Of Paradise Farm

3. A Woman Of The World (Early Idea)

4. Motorway To Damascus

5. Crapper's Delight

6. Songs Of Love (Demo)

7. Love Is Lighter Than Air

8. Comme Beaucoup De Messieurs (Avec Valérie Lemercier) Featuring – Valérie Lemercier

9. Grinchworm

10. Painting The Forth Bridge

11. Solsbury Eel

12. Frog Princess (Demo)

13. My Lovely Horse (From Father Ted)

14. Father Ted Theme

15. Lovely Mayo Mammy (From Father Ted)

16. The Miracle Is Mine (From Father Ted)

17. Theme From Casanova (Early Idea)

18. Electro Wurly Groove

19. Something Before The Weekend (Early Idea)

20. Something For The Weekend (Monitor Mix)

21. Becoming More Like Alfie (Monitor Mix)

22. Stereo Laboratory

23. Through A Long And Sleepless Night (Early Idea)

24. The Dogs And The Horses (Live)

== Personnel ==
Personnel per CD booklet A Secret History... The Best of the Divine Comedy.

- John Allen – celeste, whistle
- Darren Allison – percussion, drums, Yamaha TX16W, producer, engineer, mixing
- Kathy Brown – cello
- Jane Butterfield – trombone
- Andy Chase – producer, engineer, mixing
- Emile Chitikov – violin
- Ian Cooper – mastering
- Eos Counsell – violin
- Rob Crane – design
- Alison Fletcher – violin, viola
- Anna Giddey – violin
- Charlotte Glasson – viola
- Ruth Goldstein – cello
- Tom Gurling – assistant engineer
- Neil Hannon – bass, guitar, percussion, piano, arranger, Hammond organ, vocals, producer, tympani [timpani], art direction, Wurlitzer
- Rebecca Hayes – violin
- Robin Hayward – tuba
- Yuri Kalnitz – violin
- Robbie Kazandjian – assistant engineer
- Mark Knight – violin
- Alex McRonald – flute
- Bryan Mills – bass
- Paul Mysiak – assistant engineer
- Darren Nash – assistant engineer
- Gerard Navarro – assistant engineer
- Gareth Parton – assistant engineer
- Alex Postlethwaite – violin
- Alice Pratley – violin
- Alice Reynolds – laughs
- Joe Richards – cello
- Adrian Roach – oboe
- Laura Samuel – violin
- Padraic Savage – violin
- Chris Scard – assistant engineer
- Joby Talbot – piano, arranger, conductor, alto saxophone, orchestration
- Titch Walker – trumpet
- Jane Watkins – cello
- Kevin Westenberg – art direction, photography
- Chris Worsey – cello
