= Lucy (The Divine Comedy song) =

Single by the Divine Comedy

from the album Liberation
- B-side: "The Pop Singer's Fear of the Pollen Count" (original version); "I Was Born Yesterday"
- Released: 9 October 1993
- Length: 4:39
- Label: Setanta
- Songwriter(s): Neil Hannon; William Wordsworth
- Producer(s): Neil Hannon; Darren Allison

The Divine Comedy singles chronology
"Lucy" (1993)	"Something for the Weekend" (1996)

"Lucy" is the debut single by the Divine Comedy, released in October 1993. Written by Neil Hannon and William Wordsworth, it is the only single from the album Liberation.

== Lyrics ==
It is based on three of the Lucy poems by William Wordsworth. The song starts with "I travelled among unknown men", in which the poet tells us of his two-fold love for England and for an Englishwoman called Lucy. The second poem, "She dwelt among the untrodden ways", is about a woman the poet loved called Lucy, who is now dead. The last poem, "A slumber did my spirit seal", is about the deceased Lucy.

== Personnel ==
Per A Secret History... The Best of the Divine Comedy's CD booklet:

- Neil Hannon – vocals, guitar, bass guitar, keyboards
- Darren Allison – drums, percussion
- Quentin Hutchinson – French horn
