= Riding After Midnight =

Studio album by Clint Bradley
- Released: 23 May 2014
- Recorded: November–December 2013
- Studio: Triangle Studio, London
- Genre: Western music
- Length: 44:34
- Label: Bluelight Records
- Producer: Darren Allison, Clint Bradley

Clint Bradley chronology
Cross a Soul With Silver (2011)	Riding After Midnight (2014)	Soul Of The West (2019)

Professional ratings
Review scores
Source	Rating
Maverick	5/5 stars
Country Music People	(positive)

Riding After Midnight is the third solo album by the English singer-songwriter Clint Bradley, released in 2014, on the Bluelight Records label. It is his first dedicated Western music album.

== Track listing ==
All tracks are written by Clint Bradley, unless otherwise noted

No.	Title	Writer(s)	Length
1.	"Riding After Midnight"		4:20
2.	"My Rifle, My Pony And Me"	Dimitri Tiomkin	3:39
3.	"Doggone Cowboy"	Joe Babcock	2:57
4.	"A Fine Horse"		4:10
5.	"We Are Shane"		3:34
6.	"Call Of The Faraway Hills"	Victor Young, Mack David	3:01
7.	"I Wish I'd Been There"		4:18
8.	"Pilgrim Boy"		4:38
9.	"Man Walks Among Us"	Marty Robbins	4:25
10.	"Six Strings"		3:57
11.	"The Anvil"		5:30

== Personnel ==
- Clint Bradley - vocals, acoustic guitar, harmonies, and pen
- Nick Evans - acoustic guitar, Dobro, mandolin, and banjo
- Danny Kelly - drums and percussion
- Connie Everard - double bass
- Darren Allison - guitar ("Pilgrim Boy" & "Six Strings") and percussion ("We Are Shane")

== Production ==
- Produced by Darren Allison and Clint Bradley.
- Recorded and mixed by Darren Allison.
