= Twilight (Bôa album) =

Studio album by Bôa
- Released: 21 March 2001
- Genre: Alternative rock
- Length: 59:04
- Label: Pioneer
- Producers: Neil Walsh; Darren Allison; Bôa

Bôa chronology
Tall Snake (1999)	Twilight (2001)	Get There (2005)

Twilight is the reissued version of the 1998 album The Race of a Thousand Camels by English alternative rock band Bôa, released on 21 March 2001 by Pioneer Entertainment. It was later reissued on 7 March 2024 by Boa Recordings. During the recording of the album, the band consisted of Alex Caird, Ben Henderson, Jasmine Rodgers, Steve Rodgers, Lee Sullivan, and Paul Turrell.

The opening track, "Duvet", became popular after being used as the opening theme song of the 1998 anime television series Serial Experiments Lain. On 6 October 2023, the song received a gold certification from the RIAA. A year later, on 16 October 2024, it received platinum certification for achieving 1,000,000 certified single sales thanks to its 2024 reissue and renewed attention on social media platforms.

== Track listing ==
All tracks are written by Bôa.

Twilight track listing
No.	Title	Length
1.	"Duvet"	3:24
2.	"Twilight"	3:49
3.	"Fool"	5:07
4.	"Rain"	3:56
5.	"Elephant"	3:54
6.	"Scoring"	3:50
7.	"Deeply"	4:35
8.	"One Day"	2:41
9.	"Welcome"	5:06
10.	"For Jasmine"	5:18
11.	"Anna Maria"	4:05
12.	"Duvet" (acoustic)	5:14
13.	"Little Miss"	3:53
14.	"Drinking"	4:13
Total length:		59:04

Bandcamp release
No.	Title	Length
15.	"Duvet" (ScummV Remix)	6:26
Total length:		1:05:30

== Personnel ==
bôa

- Alex Caird – bass guitar
- Ben Henderson – electric and acoustic guitar, saxophone, percussion
- Jasmine Rodgers – lead vocals, acoustic guitar, percussion
- Lee Sullivan – drums, percussion, keyboard
- Paul Turrell – keyboard, string arrangements, percussion, electric guitar, piano
- Steve Rodgers – electric and acoustic guitar, vocals, percussion

Additional musicians

- Hannah Birch – cello
- Jude Genola – violin
- Kate Wills – viola
- Sue Baker – violin

Technical

- Steve Shin – mastering
- Darren Allison – mixing, engineering
- Jasmine Rodgers – mixing, engineering
- Jason Barron – mixing, engineering
- Neil Walsh – mixing, engineering
- Steve Rodgers – mixing, engineering
- Stuart Epps – mixing, engineering

== Charts ==
Chart performance for Twilight
Chart (2026)	Peak position
Scottish Albums (Official Charts)	47
UK Albums Sales (Official Charts)	69
UK Independent Albums (Official Charts)	20

== Release history ==
Region	Date	Label	Format	Catalog
US	21 March 2001	Pioneer	CD	5153-2
US	21 March 2001	Pioneer	Cassette	5153-4
World	20 April 2010	Nettwerk	Digital download (bandcamp edition)	—
World	20 April 2010	Boa Recordings	Digital download	—
UK	7 March 2024	Boa Recordings	CD (reissue)	5153-2
