= Sound module =

Externally controlled electronic musical instrument

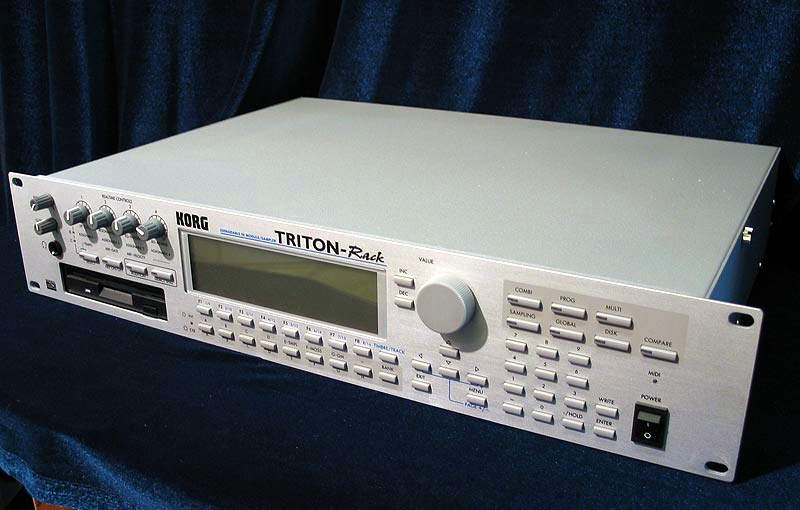
Korg Triton rack-mountable sound module

A sound module is an electronic musical instrument without a human-playable interface such as a piano-style musical keyboard. Sound modules have to be operated using an externally connected device, which is often a MIDI controller, of which the most common type is the musical keyboard. Another common way of controlling a sound module is through a sequencer, which is computer hardware or software designed to record and playback control information for sound-generating hardware. Connections between sound modules, controllers, and sequencers are generally made with MIDI (Musical Instrument Digital Interface), which is a standardized interface designed for this purpose.

Sound modules are often rack-mountable, but are also produced in table-top form factor, particularly when the intended user is a DJ or record producer. The height of a sound module is often described in rack units. Small sound modules are mostly 1U in height; the larger models are a multiple, e.g., 2U or 3U. Despite their name, most sound modules do not produce any audible sound until their output is plugged into a keyboard amplifier or a PA system.

There are a wide variety of sound modules, ranging from more generalist modules that can be used for a number of controllers or instruments (e.g., a rack-mount synthesizer with hundreds of commonly used presets of instrument sounds, from piano and organ to synth brass and string pads) to specialized modules designed for use with wind controllers, electronic drum pads, digital accordions, or to produce clonewheel organ sounds.

Hardware sound modules have largely been replaced by software synthesizers, due to the increased speed and processing power of computers and their decrease in price. In 2024, ‘’Music Radar’’ noted that synth modules are “an entire category in music production that has pretty much fallen off the face of the earth in recent years”, because “as prices for hardware synths began to fall while their versatility rose and computers began to grow more powerful, the allure of spending three or four-figure sums on a 19” unit of largely fixed sounds diminished”, to the point that in 2024, the “only sound module on the market is the…Roland Integra-7”. Nevertheless, some DJs, EDM musicians and record producers continue to use vintage 1980s sound modules like the Yamaha TX16W (1988) for their unique, retro sound.

== Terminology ==
A sound module may also be referred to as tone module, synth module, or rack module. With electronic drums, the sound module is sometimes colloquially called the brain.

== Technologies and types ==
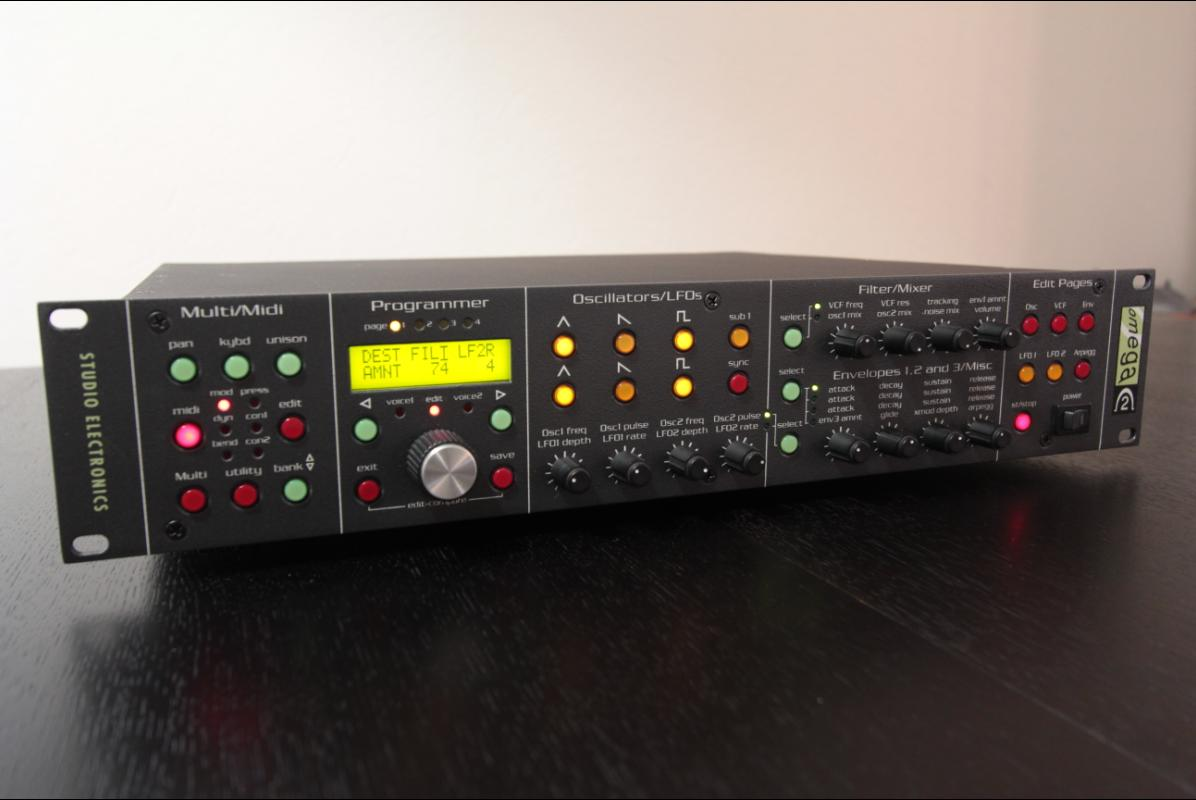
A Studio Electronics Omega 2 rackmount module

Sound modules may use any number of technologies to produce their sounds. A sound module may be an analog or digital synthesizer, a sampler, or a rompler.

Electronic drum modules are sound modules which specialize in drumkit and percussion sounds. Drum modules may be triggered by external trigger pads or pickups attached to an acoustic drum as well as through MIDI controller pads. Drum modules are distinguished from drum machines through their lack of dedicated onboard triggers and lack of an integrated sequencer.

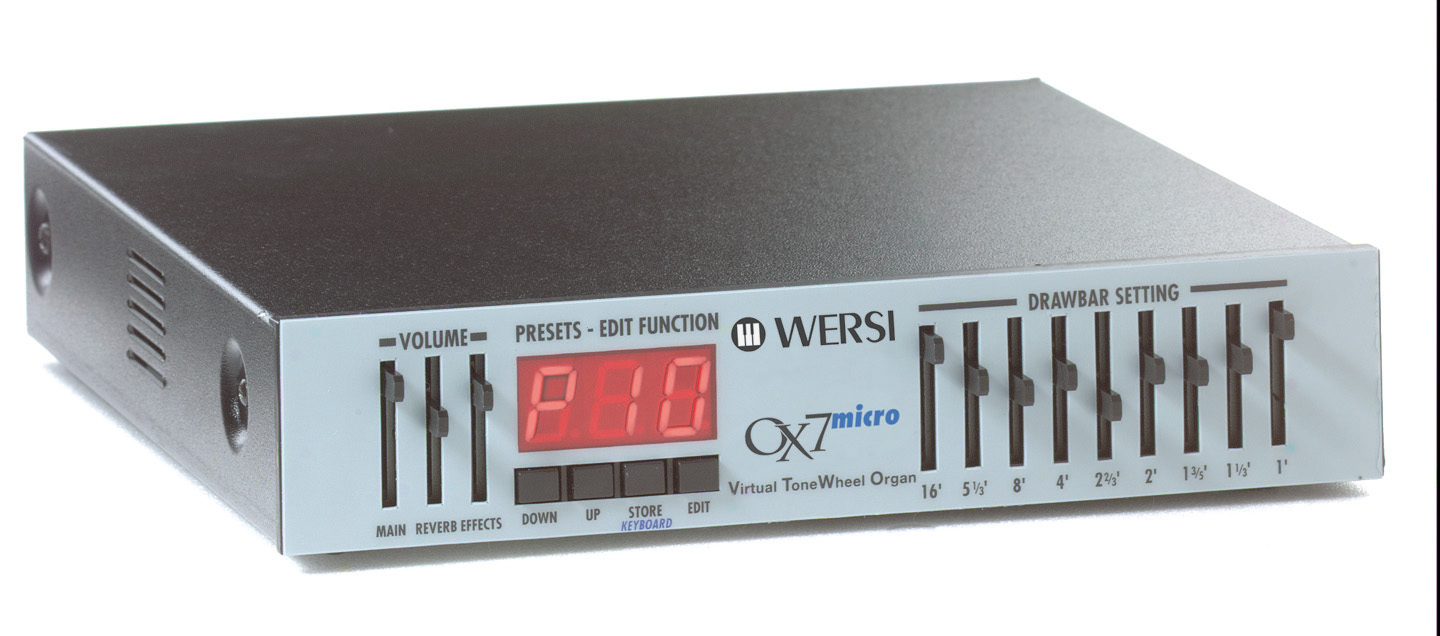
A WERSI OX7 micro, a clonewheel organ module

Clonewheel organ modules are usually tabletop-style devices that enable keyboardists to recreate the sound of a tonewheel-based Hammond organ using any MIDI keyboard or MIDI-equipped stage piano. Organ modules may have drawbars and controls for a simulated Leslie speaker (a rotating horn and low-end baffle) effect.

Some sound modules focus on piano sounds, typically providing grand piano, electric piano, and a few other keyboard sounds, such as clavinet.

Wind controller modules are specialized synth modules that are designed to work with wind controllers. They typically support legato wind-style playing and can respond to the unique controller inputs, which sense breath, biting on the mouthpiece, and pressing keys. Wind controller players may use a specialized wind controller module such as the Yamaha VL70-m module or its predecessors, the VL-1 or VL-7. As well, wind controller players may use general-purpose rack synthesizers such as the Yamaha Motif XS Rack, Roland Fantom X, or the Roland Integra-7 rackmount MIDI sound module; however, these general-purpose synthesizer modules require extra wind sounds or patches to work well with wind controllers.

An accordion module, which is designed for use with a MIDI-equipped digital accordion, focuses on providing synthesized or sampled accordion sounds (and sounds for related bellows-pumped instruments, such as bandoneon and concertina). Like other specialized sound modules, accordion modules also have other sounds (piano, string orchestra, flute, etc.). More so than for other sound modules, accordion modules are likely to also have music sequencer, drum machine, and backing track features, to enable a performer to do a one man band show. Accordion modules are manufactured by firms such as Ketron and Soltron.

Synth modules often have onboard effects units, such as reverb and chorus effect, or, for organ modules, vibrato and overdrive.

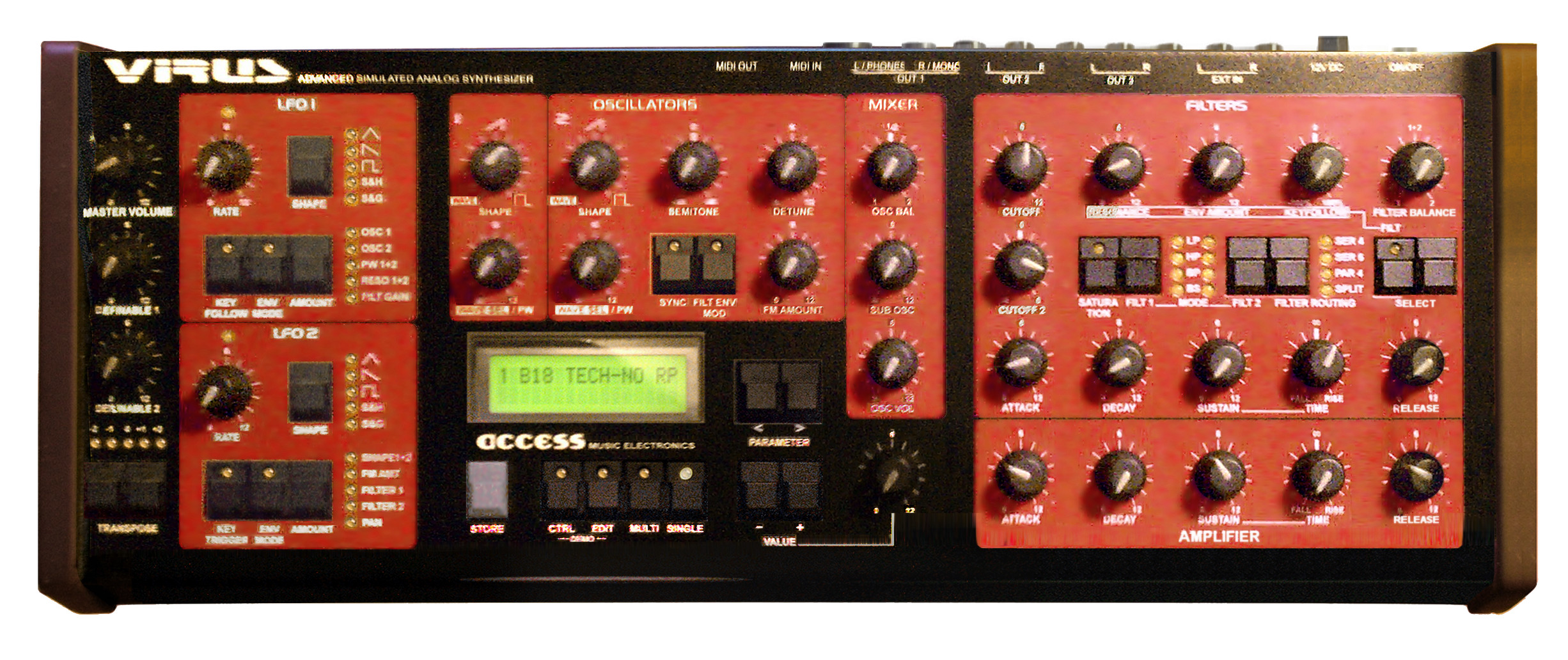
The Access Virus A module

Because most electronic instruments are designed in a modularized way, manufacturers often release a sound module version of their fully integrated instruments. For example, the 1980s-era DX-7 synthesizer/keyboard was also sold as a standalone sound module, the TX-7. A sound module may have all the other features of the controller-equipped version, but it often has a smaller display or limited programming controls. In this case, instrument and other sounds can be loaded through MIDI or external media. In some cases, sound modules have expanded capacity for sounds in comparison to the controller-equipped version.

== User interface ==
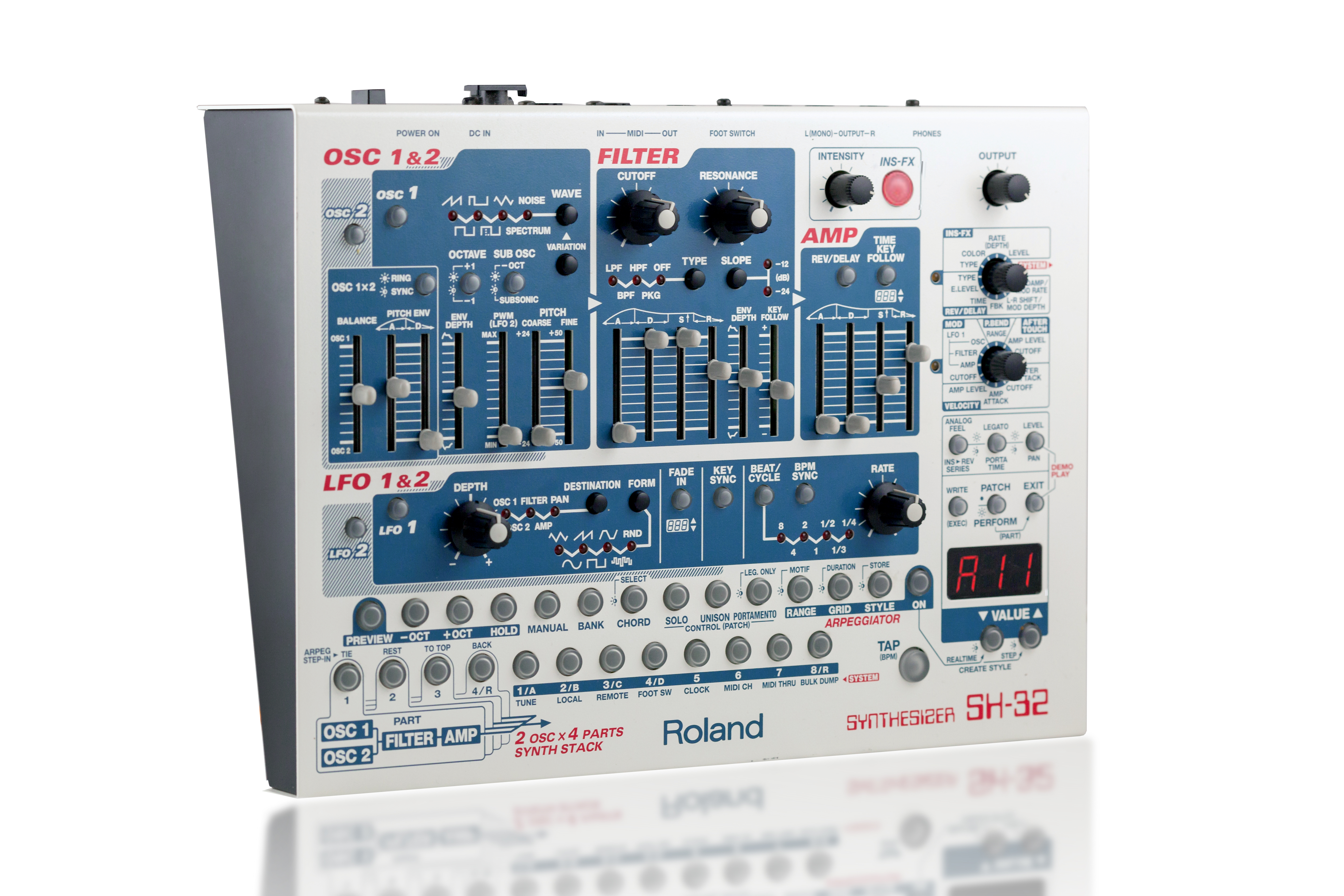
Roland SH-32

The front of a rackmount sound module, or the top for tabletop units, typically contains a small screen or panel to provide information to the user. An LCD panel or an LED alphanumeric display may be supplemented with LED indicators to show the status of various features. In some models, LED indicators are embedded within a translucent button, so pressing the button shows its status on the button. There is usually a volume control, some types of buttons or knobs for selecting sounds and changing settings, and a power button. The front panel may also have a headphone jack, USB port, or another port for making connections. The smallest, simplest piano modules may have only a volume knob and a knob to select different piano sounds. The most complex synth modules may have a large number of knobs, buttons, and faders to control oscillators, filters, and amplitude settings.

The rear panel usually contains 1/4 inch left and right audio outputs and one or more 5-pin MIDI inputs. Some units may have MIDI thru connections, which can be used to chain devices. Starting in the 2010s, some modules have one or two USB connections and can be connected to a computer (laptop, tablet, etc.), to allow the user to use editing software to make advanced changes to settings or sounds.

== Advantages ==
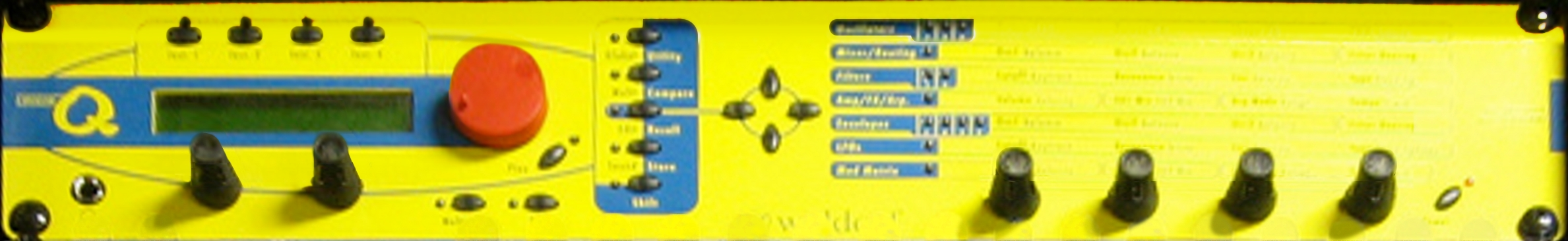
A Waldorf Micro Q module

A sound module has the same advantages over a fully integrated instrument as does any system with a modularized design:

- Cost – a sound module is cheaper than a comparable instrument equipped with a controller.
- Space and weight – a sound module takes up less room and weighs less than an instrument equipped with a controller, facilitating transportation and touring.
- Portability – a performer going on tour can bring only their sound modules, so long as a MIDI controller (e.g., a MIDI keyboard) is provided as backline gear. Many professional studios have a MIDI stage piano on hand.
- Expandability – many sound modules can be expanded with sounds and memory.
- Troubleshooting – if a sound module in a rack case develops problems, just this one unit can be removed for repair or replacement, leaving the rest of a keyboard player's rig the same (e.g., other rack-mounted sound modules, power amps, etc.).
- Obsolescence cycles – when it becomes obsolete, a sound module can be replaced without changing a favorite controller, or vice versa.

== Notable examples ==
- Roland MKS-20: Piano sound module used by many bands in the 1980s to early 1990s. Based on the synth engine from the RD-1000 digital piano (the full version with a keyboard).
- Yamaha TX16W (1988): sound module with an ability to boot its operating system (OS) from diskette; known particularly well for having a third-party OS codenamed Typhoon 2000 by NuEdge Development, a group of hackers who were dissatisfied with the original OS.
- Roland Sound Canvas series (1991): first sound module to implement General MIDI standard with Roland GS extensions.
- Roland MKS-80: modular version of the Jupiter-6 and the Jupiter-8. Used by artists such as Harold Faltermeyer, Hans Zimmer, Tangerine Dream, and Madonna.
- Roland JD-990: enhanced rack version of JD-800, which features 195 waveforms and has a display to program parameters.
- Kurzweil K2000R: modular version of Kurzweil K2000

== Difference from audio interfaces ==
Audio interfaces may be confused with sound modules. The audio interface connects a computer to other devices. Software in the computer actually generates sound using samples or synthesis. The functionality of the computer and audio interface plus the software can perform a superset of the functions of a sound module.

== See also ==
- Modular synthesizer
- Sound card
