= Duvet (song) =

1998 single by Bôa

- Cover of the 2018 Japanese vinyl release

Single by Bôa

from the album The Race of a Thousand Camels and Twilight
- Released: 1998
- Genre: Alternative rock
- Length: 3:24
- Label: Polystar
- Songwriter: Bôa
- Producers: Neil Walsh; Darren Allison; Bôa

"Duvet" is a song by the British alternative rock band Bôa. It first appeared on their 1998 album The Race of a Thousand Camels. It was also featured on their 2001 record, Twilight. The song originally became popular after being used as the opening theme to the anime series Serial Experiments Lain. The song later gained popularity on TikTok, which resulted in Bôa reforming after an 18-year hiatus. The single was certified platinum by the Recording Industry Association of America (RIAA) on 16 October 2024, for selling over 1,000,000 copies in the United States.

== Description ==
Variety described the song as "nostalgic and tender, painting a colorful picture of intermingling instruments that come together to build a chirpy, guitar-pop sound. It's the kind of song that would play in a romantic scene of a '90s rom-com taking place during a pivotal summer in the main character's life."

== Music video ==
The original music video was released in 1998. The rooftop performance section was filmed in New Malden High Street. A second music video was released in 2023 in response to the song's renewed popularity.

== Charts ==
Chart performance for "Duvet"
Chart (2023–2026)	Peak position
Canada Hot 100 (Billboard)	57
Global 200 (Billboard)	108
Sweden (Sverigetopplistan)	58
Switzerland (Schweizer Hitparade)	99
UK Indie (Official Charts)	19
US Billboard Hot 100	75
US Hot Rock & Alternative Songs (Billboard)	18

== Certifications ==
Certifications for "Duvet"
Region	Certification	Certified units/sales
United Kingdom (BPI) Sales since 2021	Platinum	600,000^{‡}
United States (RIAA)	Platinum	1,000,000^{‡}
^{‡} Sales+streaming figures based on certification alone.
