= Anthony Reynolds =

Welsh musician (born 1971)

Anthony Reynolds is a Welsh musician. He has worked as a solo artist and in collaboration with others in his bands Jack and Jacques.

== Jack ==
In 1993, Reynolds moved to London, where he formed the group Jack, on lead vocals, signing a music publishing deal with Warner/Chappell Music as well as a record deal with independent label Too Pure.

Jack released three full-length albums, the first two of which – Pioneer Soundtracks (1996) and The Jazz Age (1998) – garnered excellent reviews and placed highly in critics' end-of-year polls. Despite the overwhelmingly positive critical reaction and extensive UK and European touring, sales for both records although respectable, were ultimately disappointing, and no Jack record would ever make the UK Top 40 singles or albums charts.

The third album, The End of the Way It's Always Been, was released on the Les Disques du Crépuscule label. The record featured collaborations with writer/musician Kirk Lake and American poet and novelist/screenwriter Dan Fante (son of John Fante). An extensive European tour promoted the record. The critical reaction in the UK to the album was less positive than for the first two Jack albums, but the album was markedly successful in France.

Jack also recorded a five-track EP 'La belle et la Discothèque' with ex-Cocteau Twins bassist Simon Raymonde, son of arranger Ivor Raymonde.

== Jacques ==
During Jack's existence, Reynolds (occasionally with Jack co-writer/lead guitarist Matthew Scott) also recorded two albums and a handful of singles and EPs in his side project Jacques. Both albums were released by Setanta Records.

The first Jacques album, How To Make Love, Vol. 1 (1997), was produced by Momus, featuring a more sparse, experimental sound than Reynolds' work with Jack. Compared to the critical garlands bestowed upon Pioneer Soundtracks, the hastily recorded album (completed in seven days) received mixed reviews.

The second album, To Stars (2000), had more in common with the expansive, orchestral Jack sound and was generally more well-received than its predecessor.

Sales were modest for both Jacques albums, and a planned third album was cancelled midway through recording, when Jacques were dropped by Setanta in 2001.

== Other work ==
Reynolds has released three solo full-length albums – Neu York (2004), credited to "Anthony", and British Ballads (2007) and A Painter's Life (2019) released under his full name. A footnote to Neu York – (I was born) in prehistoric Spain – was released in 2005 on the Spanish Moonpalace label.

Reynolds has stated that he considers British Ballads to be his "proper" debut solo record. It featured cameos from English writer Colin Wilson, singer-songwriter and pianist John Howard, ex-Cocteau Twin Simon Raymonde, Dot Allison and English folk artist Vashti Bunyan.

The album received some of the best reviews of Reynolds' career, but yet again, with no real radio play and without funds to tour, the sales were disappointing. From the off, Reynolds considered this his "final debut", stating on his Myspace blog that, since the majority of the musicians appearing on British Ballads were session musicians, it was financially impractical to consider recording a new album on the same scale. Despite this he did however release 'A Painter's life' in 2019, featuring Carl Bevan (60Ft Dolls), Richard Glover (Dub War) and Rob Dean (Japan). In 2011 a 2CD compilation 'Life's too Long' was released.

In 2002, immediately after Jack's final concert (in Cardiff) Reynolds attended a Simon Raymonde recording session where Vashti Bunyan was recording her version of a Reynolds song; 'Just so you know'. This would eventually surface six years later, on the Bees dream of flowers and your meadows summer breath EP.

In 2009 Reynolds also joined a Spanish band, La Muneca de Sal, on lead vocals, contributing some of his own songs. The band performed original material as well as songs from Reynolds' previous projects.

He has collaborated with many other artists, both as a co-composer and producer, including Momus, Colin Wilson, Dan Fante, Vashti Bunyan, Kirk lake, Martin Carr, Dot Allison, Kirk lake, Ian M Hazeldine (in 2019 on the single In A Café At The End Of The World by Anthonymes), Charlotte Greig and the Italian groups Hollowblue and Marti and the Spanish group Migala. In 2000, he sang with the Moscow Philharmonic on an album by the French film composer Franck Roussel. In 2016 he composed soundtracks to two feature-length films: Open my Eyes and an adaptation of the Colin Wilson novel, Adrift in Soho. The latter was released via Amazon Prime in 2020.

Reynolds has also written five full-length biographies. The first, on the 1960s group The Walker Brothers, was released in the UK and US by Jawbone press in August 2009. The second, a commission by Plexus books, on the singer-songwriter Jeff Buckley, was published again in both countries in July that year. In 2011, Leonard Cohen – a remarkable life, Reynolds' biography on Leonard Cohen, was published by Omnibus press. It has since gone on to be published in twelve languages. In 2015 his biography of the band Japan: A foreign place was released via Burning shed followed by 'Cries and Whispers' in 2017 which details the solo careers of all Ex-Japan members. Both these books were translated into Japanese. In 2020 he also edited and contributed to Stephen Holden's 'Adolescent Alternatives' an account of early Japan.

Since 1992, Reynolds has also worked occasionally as a journalist, writing essays and critiques for various magazines in the UK and the US, most notably Stop Smiling magazine, Classic Pop, Shindig and The Sunday Express.

In 2002, Les Disques du Crépuscule published a collection of his lyrics, poetry and prose entitled "These Roses taste like ashes". This was followed by another collection of poetry in 2007 : 'Calling all demons'. Both of these are included in the anthology 'Interior Cities' (selected lyrics - 1995-2020).

He also occasionally acts in short films.

== Personal life ==
Reynolds was born in Cardiff, Wales, in 1971. Since then Reynolds has lived in London, Paris, Shropshire, Spain, and Cardiff.

He currently lives in Wales.
