= Gin Soaked Boy =

Single by the Divine Comedy

from the album A Secret History... The Best of the Divine Comedy
- Released: 1 November 1999
- Genre: Chamber pop
- Length: 5:03
- Label: Setanta Records
- Songwriter: Neil Hannon

The Divine Comedy singles chronology
"The Pop Singer's Fear of the Pollen Count" (1999)	"Gin Soaked Boy" (1999)	"Love What You Do" (2001)

Music video
- "Gin Soaked Boy" on YouTube

"Gin Soaked Boy" is a song by Northern Irish chamber pop band The Divine Comedy. It was the second single from the album A Secret History... The Best of the Divine Comedy, released in 1999 on Setanta Records. The song peaked at No. 38 on the UK Singles Chart and stayed on the chart for two weeks.

One of the single's B-sides, "My Lovely Horse", was first heard in the Father Ted series two episode "A Song for Europe" and was written by Hannon and Father Ted co-writers and co-creators Arthur Mathews and Graham Linehan.

== Track listing ==
All tracks written by Neil Hannon, except where indicated.

CD 1

1. "Gin Soaked Boy" (Radio Edit) – 4:02
2. "Songs of Love" (Phil Thornalley Remix) – 3:26
3. "I Am" (Brian Eno, Neil Hannon) – 2:50

CD 2 (enhanced)

1. "Gin Soaked Boy" (Album Version) – 5:04
2. "Geronimo" (Live French Black Session with Yann Tiersen) – 1:50
3. "My Lovely Horse" (Arthur Mathews, Graham Linehan, Neil Hannon) – 1:25
4. "Gin Soaked Boy" (Video)

Cassette

1. "Gin Soaked Boy" (Album Version)
2. "Europop" (Live from the Bowlie Weekender)
