= Summertime Healing =

Single by Eusebe

from the album Tales From Mama's Yard
- Length: 4:01
- Label: Mama's Yard
- Songwriter(s): S. Eusebe, S. Eusebe, A. Ettiene, M. Gaye
- Producer(s): Saybe

"Summertime Healing" is a song by the English group Eusebe. The song was released as a single in 1995 from the forthcoming debut album, Tales From Mama's Yard. "Summertime Healing" peaked at number 32 on the British charts and 80 on the ARIA Charts.

== Track listing ==
1. "Summertime Healing" (Radio Edit) - 4:01
2. "Summertime Healing" (Album Version) - 5:16
3. "Summertime Healing" (Delta B Boy Classic) - 4:51
4. "Eusube Do" - 3:27

== Charts ==
Chart (1995/96)	Peak position
Australia (ARIA Charts)	80
United Kingdom (OCC)	32
