= Jack (band) =

British rock band

- Origin: Cardiff, Wales
- Genres: Alternative rock; chamber pop; Britpop
- Years active: 1992–2002
- Labels: Too Pure; Acaruela; Crepuscule
- Past members: Anthony Reynolds; Matthew Scott; Richard Adderley; Patrick Pulzer; Colin Williams; George Wright; James Lang; Audrey Morse; Lucy Wilkins; Ruth Gottlieb

Jack were a British alternative rock band formed in Cardiff, Wales, in 1992. Their orchestral pop was influenced by artists such as Scott Walker, David Bowie and Roxy Music, and drew comparisons to Tindersticks, Nick Cave and the Bad Seeds, Suede and The Divine Comedy. The band attracted a cult following in the United Kingdom and continental Europe, particularly France, but they failed to match the commercial success of their britpop contemporaries. They split in 2002.

== History ==
The band was formed in Cardiff in 1992 by singer-songwriter Anthony Reynolds and guitarist Matthew Scott. The pair moved to London in 1993, where they recruited Richard Adderley (guitar), Audrey Morse (violin), Patrick Pulzer (drums), Colin Williams (bass) and George Wright (keyboards).

They signed to Too Pure in 1995, with their first release for the label being the limited-edition "Kid Stardust" single (a tribute to Charles Bukowski) in November that year. Their debut album, Pioneer Soundtracks, was released in June 1996.

Produced by Peter Walsh, the album garnered excellent reviews, but despite considerable touring both in the United Kingdom and Europe, the three initial singles drawn from the album - "Wintercomessummer", "White Jazz", and "Biography Of A First Son" - failed to pick up any serious airplay and as a result sales were disappointing.

Morse had left the band a year after recording their debut. She was replaced by Lucy Wilkins in summer 1996. Wilkins was in turn replaced by Ruth Gottlieb the following year.

Following a renegotiation of their contract with Too Pure, they returned to the studio with Divine Comedy producer Darren Allison in autumn 1997 to work on their second album.

The Jazz Age was released in August 1998. Despite more excellent reviews and further European touring, the two singles from the album, "Lolita Elle" and "Steamin’" received little airplay and sales were once again disappointing.

A mooted follow-up album, An Anatomy Of Melancholy, was abandoned after the band was dropped by Too Pure and both Adderley and Gottlieb left the band, while Pulzer split his time with Rosita, formed by ex-Kenickie members Marie Du Santiago and Emmy Kate Montrose.

A five-track mini-album, La Belle et la Discotheque, produced by former Cocteau Twins bassist Simon Raymonde, was released in September 2000. Although reviews were once again excellent, sales were low - although two tracks, "Sometimes" and "Disco-Cafe-Society" were playlisted on Spanish national radio. By this time Williams, Wright and Pulzer had the left the band and Scott and Reynolds elected to continue as a duo.

A final album, The End Of The Way It's Always Been was released in April 2002. The group disbanded later that year after an extensive European tour, including an appearance at the Benicàssim festival. They played their final concert in Cardiff in November.

Pulzer and Adderley later resurfaced as members of The Boyfriends.

Pioneer Soundtracks was reissued in a belated 'Tenth Anniversary Edition' on the Spinney label in March 2007, with an additional CD of alternative versions, B-sides and live tracks.

== Discography ==
=== Albums ===
- Pioneer Soundtracks (Too Pure, 1996)
- The Jazz Age (Too Pure, 1998)
- The End of the Way It's Always Been (Crepuscule, 2002)

=== Singles and EPs ===
- "Kid Stardust" (Too Pure, 1995)
- "Wintercomesummer" (Too Pure, 1996)
- "White Jazz" (Too Pure, 1996)
- "Biography of a First Son" (Too Pure, 1996)
- "Fall in Love with Me Again" (Elefant, 1997)
- Lolita EP (Too Pure, 1998)
- "Steamin'" (Too Pure, 1998)
- La Belle et la Discotheque, (Acuarela, 2000)
- "The Emperor of New London" (Crepuscule, 2002)
- "Sleepin' Makes Me Thirsty" (Crepuscule, 2002)
