= Liberation (The Divine Comedy album) =

Studio album by the Divine Comedy
- Released: 16 August 1993
- Recorded: March 1993
- Studio: Fundamental, London
- Genre: Pop; art pop
- Length: 51:57
- Label: Setanta
- Producer: Neil Hannon; Darren Allison

The Divine Comedy chronology
Fanfare for the Comic Muse (1990)	Liberation (1993)	Promenade (1994)

Singles from Liberation
- 1. "Lucy" Released: 18 October 1993

Liberation is the second album by Northern Irish chamber pop band the Divine Comedy, released on 16 August 1993 by Setanta Records. Following the unsuccessful Fanfare for the Comic Muse, the group started improvising on their new album which was recorded in Fundamental, London in March 1993. Although it was the band's second album, the band's leader, Neil Hannon, often refers to it as the first, due to the stylistic differences from their debut album, Fanfare for the Comic Muse.

== Background ==
=== Production ===
The album was recorded over the space of twelve days in March, 1993 by Hannon and Darren Allison. Hannon played most of the instruments on the album, while Allison was the recording engineer and drummer. It includes instruments like harpsichord, violin, viola, cello, French horn, and a Hammond B3 organ.

=== Composition ===
Liberation includes a mixture of pop and art pop music. Several of the album tracks are inspired by or refer to works of literature: "Bernice Bobs Her Hair" is based on the short story of the same name by F. Scott Fitzgerald; "Three Sisters" is about the play of the same name by Anton Chekhov; "Lucy" is an amalgamation of three of the Lucy poems by William Wordsworth; "Timewatching" is inspired by the popular song "When I Fall In Love"; the title of "Death of a Supernaturalist" references the poem "Death of a Naturalist" by Seamus Heaney and the recording is preceded by a quote from A Room with a View by E. M. Forster, spoken by Julian Sands and Daniel Day-Lewis and sampled from the Merchant-Ivory film of the same name. More playfully, "Festive Road" is a tribute to the children's television programme Mr Benn.

== Critical reception ==
Professional ratings
Review scores
Source	Rating
AllMusic	3/5 stars
Hot Press	10/12
Select	4/5

In a retrospective AllMusic review, Ned Raggett rated Liberation with three stars out of five, declaring it as Divine Comedy's first "full album".

== Track listing ==
All songs written and arranged by Neil Hannon; additional lyrics on "Lucy" by William Wordsworth.

No.	Title	Length
1.	"Festive Road"	1:56
2.	"Death of a Supernaturalist"	3:18
3.	"Bernice Bobs Her Hair"	4:00
4.	"I Was Born Yesterday"	3:29
5.	"Your Daddy's Car"	3:55
6.	"Europop"	4:30
7.	"Timewatching"	3:53
8.	"The Pop Singer's Fear of the Pollen Count"	4:19
9.	"Queen of the South"	4:27
10.	"Victoria Falls"	4:10
11.	"Three Sisters"	4:42
12.	"Europe by Train"	4:27
13.	"Lucy"	4:39

2020 Remaster Bonus Disc Liberation: Leftovers

All tracks are written by Neil Hannon, except where otherwise indicated; additional lyrics on "Lucy" by William Wordsworth.

No.	Title	Writer(s)	Original release	Length
1.	"Untitled Melody" (Recorded at The Church, London 1993)	Edwyn Collins	Indulgence No. 1	2:02
2.	"Your Daddy's Car" (Demo - Home Recording)		A Secret History... The Best of the Divine Comedy - Rarities	3:53
3.	"Queen Of The South" (Demo - Home Recording)			4:08
4.	"Europop" (Recorded Live at Cite de la Musique, Paris, 2008)			4:10
5.	"Little Darlin'" (Home Recording)			1:26
6.	"Bernice Bobs Her Hair" (Early Idea - Home Recording)			2:57
7.	"Bontempi Beats 1" (Home Recording)			2:29
8.	"The Pop Singer's Fear Of The Pollen Count" (Demo - Home Recording)			4:20
9.	"Europe By Train" (Recorded Live at the Shepherd's Bush Empire, London, 1996)		Everybody Knows (Except You)	4:59
10.	"I Can Think (But I Can't Feel)" (Home Recording)			2:59
11.	"Lucy" (Early Version - Home Recording)		The Frog Princess	4:02
12.	"Festive Road" (Demo - Home Recording)			2:11
13.	"Three Sisters" (Recorded at La Cigale, Paris, 1993)		La Cigale 6-11-93	4:12
14.	"I Was Born Yesterday" (Early Idea - Home Recording)			3:10
15.	"Bontempi Beats 2" (Home Recording)			2:56
16.	"Christmas With The Hannons" (Home Recording)			2:29
17.	"Victoria Falls" (Demo - Home Recording)			4:11
18.	"Timewatching" (Demo - Home Recording)			3:31
19.	"Bontempi Beats 3" (Home Recording)			2:30
20.	"Suzanne" (Recorded at The Garage, London, 1993)	Leonard Cohen		3:30

== Personnel ==
Per 1999 CD booklet of the A Secret History... The Best of the Divine Comedy.

- Neil Hannon – vocals, guitars, bass guitar, keyboards
- Darren Allison – drums, percussion
- Lucy Castle – viola, violin
- Monica Scott – cello
- Quentin Hutchinson – french horn
