= Juan Martín (guitarist) =

Spanish musician

- Born: 1948 (age 77–78)
- Genre: Flamenco music
- Occupations: Composer, guitarist
- Instrument: Guitar

Juan Cristóbal Martín (born 1948) is a Spanish flamenco guitarist and an author of flamenco guitar method books.

== Career ==
Raised in Malaga, Juan Martín started learning the guitar at the age of six. In his early twenties he moved to Madrid to study under Niño Ricardo and Paco de Lucía. He played in clubs in Málaga, Seville and Granada. He soon moved to London, where he has developed most of his career. One of his first recordings was Picasso Portraits (1981) based on the music he played at Picasso's 90th birthday celebrations. Each section is a depiction of a painting by Pablo Picasso. Although it was not released until the 1990s, he recorded a track with Rory Gallagher in 1984 (on the album Wheels Within Wheels). Also in 1984, his track "Love Theme from The Thorn Birds" reached number 10 in the UK Singles Chart. He recorded with Herbie Hancock in 1987, and has played on stage with Miles Davis.

Juan Martín is the author of several textbooks on flamenco playing, including El Arte Flamenco de la Guitarra, issued with cassette tapes and later with vinyl sound sheets, and Solos Flamencos issued with CDs and DVDs. Both tutorial books, printed in English and Spanish, are successful in the English-speaking world.

He now divides his time between London and Málaga.

He has an English wife, Helen. They have a family business called Flamencovision.

== Discography ==
- The Exciting Sound of Flamenco (1974)
- The Flamenco Soul (1976)
- Ole, Don Juan! Flamenco En Andalucia (1977)
- Romance (1978)
- Picasso Portraits (1981)
- Serenade (1984) (with the Royal Philharmonic Orchestra)
- Painter in Sound (1986)
- Through The Moving Window (1988)
- Painter in Sound (1990)
- Musica Alhambra (1996)
- Music Alhambra (1998)
- Luna Negra (1992)re'released 1998
- Arte Flamenco Puro
- The Andalucian Suites I-IV (1998)
- Camino Latino (2002)
- Live En Directo (2005)
- El Alquimista (The Alchemist) (2005)
- Solo (2009)
- La Guitarra - Mi Vida (2015) (with Chaparro de Málaga)

Juan Martín and Antonio Aparecida

- Riquezas (2002)

DVD

- Guitar Nights: The Four Martins (2003) : Martin Taylor, Martin Simpson, Juan Martin, Martin Carthy
