= Bôa =

English rock band

- Origin: London, England
- Genres: Alternative rock; indie rock
- Years active: 1993–2005; 2023–present
- Labels: Nettwerk Music Group; Polystar; Pioneer LDC; Boa Recordings
- Members: Jasmine Rodgers; Alex Caird; Lee Sullivan
- Past members: Ben Henderson; Ed Herten; Steve Rodgers; Paul Turrell
- Website: boaukofficial.com

Bôa (stylized in all lowercase as bôa) is an English indie rock band formed in London in 1993 by drummer Ed Herten, keyboardist Paul Turrell, and guitarist/vocalist Steve Rodgers. The band progressed from playing funk to rock over the years, as bassist Alex Caird and multi-instrumentalist Ben Henderson joined, and Jasmine Rodgers joined as vocalist.

Bôa produced two major albums in the 2000s, Twilight (2001) and Get There (2005). Their 1998 single "Duvet" has been certified Platinum by the RIAA.

The band released the album Whiplash in 2024, their first new music in 19 years.

== History ==
Originally a jazz/funk band, Bôa was formed in 1993 by drummer Ed Herten, keyboardist Paul Turrell, and Steve Rodgers on guitar and vocals. Alex Caird, who had played with Herten in the band Draggin' Bones, was recruited on bass guitar. Rodgers's younger sister, Jasmine, was invited to sing the chorus of one of their first songs, "Fran", and she soon became the lead singer of the group. Jasmine and Steve are children of Paul Rodgers, best known for being the vocalist of Bad Company. Ben Henderson, who had played with Caird in the psychedelic rock band Doctor Sky, was recruited shortly afterward to play saxophone.

Bôa's first live performance was in January 1994, at the London Forum, supporting Paul Rodgers. The same year, Herten left the band.

Bôa added a new drummer, Lee Sullivan, the son of Terry Sullivan, a former drummer for the band Renaissance. The group's style began to shift to a rock sound around this time, and Henderson took up playing the guitar instead of the saxophone.

In 1996, the band signed a contract with the Japanese label Polystar and began working on their debut album. They recorded three songs, "Twilight", "Deeply", and "Elephant", with producer Darren Allison. The record, titled The Race of a Thousand Camels, came out in 1998, preceded by the single "Duvet". The track was used as the opening theme of the Japanese anime series Serial Experiments Lain.

In 2000, Polystar released Bôa's Tall Snake EP and featured "Duvet" on the 20th Anniversary of Polystar Collection Vol.1 Female Vocal Love Songs compilation. The same year, Henderson left the band.

In 2001, due to contractual disagreements with Polystar, the band changed labels and signed with Pioneer LDC. Race of a Thousand Camels was retitled Twilight and released to US audiences in 2001, with two new tracks. Bôa played shows across the US to promote the record, but halfway through the tour, Turrell departed the group.

In 2003, "Duvet" was remixed by DJ Wasei and released on another Lain soundtrack, titled Serial Experiment Lain Soundtrack: Cyberia Mix.

That year, Bôa decided to establish their own label, called Boa Recordings. They also began work on their third album, titled Get There, and released it in 2005. Steve Rodgers parted with the band later in 2005 to pursue independent work, stating in an interview with The Northern Echo that he "had a lot [he] wanted to sing about and there's a lot of freedom when you're solo".

In 2012, Bôa started a JustGiving page and announced their support for AAR Japan, a charity that responded to the impact of the 2011 tsunami.

On 4 January 2017, former keyboard player Paul Turrell died. In May, an unreleased Bôa album was discovered on Turrell's website, titled The Farm.

In December 2018, a vinyl edition of "Duvet" was published exclusively in Japan. In August 2021, the song saw a massive resurgence in popularity, especially on TikTok, with over 250,000 posts featuring it as of August 2023. In September, it reached the Official Independent Singles Breakers Chart and peaked at no. 12, charting for two weeks. The band released a brand new music video for the song in October. They credited the song's renewed popularity for their first reunion since 2005s Get There. The track went viral on TikTok again in September 2026 and reached number 32 in the UK's Independent Singles Chart and 93 on Billboard's Hot 100.

In June 2023, Bôa announced that they would release a new album, titled Whiplash. In March 2024, they issued the single "Walk with Me", their first new music in 19 years. A second single, "Beautiful & Broken", came out on 3 May. They released the tracks "Worry" on 14 June and "Whiplash" on 29 July. The fifth single from the album, "Vienna", came out on 6 September. On 16 October 2024, the band received Platinum certification from the RIAA for "Duvet". In August 2024, the band started a tour to support the release of the Whiplash album which has seen them perform sold out headline tours in the US, Europe, Australia and Turkey. In 2025, they performed at Lollapalooza, headlined at Corona Capital's Escenario Doritos stage and Austin Psych Fest and have continued to tour extensively, including a tour of China in October 2026, selling out all but one show.

To celebrate the 25th anniversary of Twilight's release, in 2026, Bôa issued a limited-edition zoetrope vinyl edition of the album.

== Side projects ==
In September 2004, Steve and Jasmine performed the Bôa song "Drinking" with their father for a concert featuring Joe Walsh, Gary Moore, Brian May, Hank Marvin, David Gilmour, and Mike Rutherford, among others, marking the 50th anniversary of the Fender Stratocaster guitar. The event was recorded and released a year later as the film The Strat Pack: Live in Concert.

Jasmine Rodgers records as a solo artist, and she has released a self-titled EP (2010) and the full-length albums Blood Red Sun (2016) and Dark Tides (2024).

== Band members ==
Current

- Jasmine Rodgers – vocals, guitars, percussion (1993–present)
- Alex Caird – bass (1993–present)
- Lee Sullivan – drums, percussion, keyboards (1994–present)

Past

- Steve Rodgers – guitars, vocals (1993–2005)
- Paul Turrell – keyboards, percussion, guitars (1993–2001; died 2017)
- Ed Herten – drums, percussion (1993–1994)
- Ben Henderson – guitars, saxophone, percussion (1993–2000)

== Discography ==
=== Studio albums ===
Title	Album details	Peak chart positions	
Title	Album details	UK Ind.	SCO
The Race of a Thousand Camels	Released: 1 July 1998; Label: Polystar; Format: CD, LP	—	—
Twilight	Released: 21 March 2001; Label: Pioneer, Nettwerk; Format: CD, LP, digital download, streaming	20	47
Get There	Released: 22 April 2005; Label: Boa Recording, Nettwerk; Format: CD, LP, digital download, streaming	—	—
Whiplash	Released: 18 October 2024; Label: Boa Recording, Nettwerk; Format: CD, LP, digital download, streaming	—	—

=== EPs ===
- Duvet (1998)
- Tall Snake (1999)

=== Singles ===
Title	Year	Peak chart positions					Certifications	Album
Title	Year	UK Ind.	CAN	SWE	US	WW	Certifications	Album
"Duvet"	1998	19	57	58	75	108	BPI: Platinum; RIAA: Platinum	The Race of a Thousand Camels and Twilight
"Walk with Me"	2024	—	—	—	—	—		Whiplash
"Beautiful & Broken"	2024	—	—	—	—	—		Whiplash
"Worry"	2024	—	—	—	—	—		Whiplash

== Filmography ==
- The Strat Pack: Live in Concert (2005)
