= Something for the Weekend (song) =

Single by the Divine Comedy

from the album Casanova
- Released: 17 June 1996
- Recorded: 1995–1996
- Genre: Orchestral pop
- Length: 4:19
- Label: Setanta
- Songwriter(s): Neil Hannon
- Producer(s): Darren Allison; Neil Hannon

The Divine Comedy singles chronology
"Lucy" (1993)	"Something for the Weekend" (1996)	"Becoming More Like Alfie" (1996)

Official video
- "Something for the Weekend" on YouTube

"Something for the Weekend" is a song by the Divine Comedy, produced by Darren Allison and Neil Hannon. It was the first single from Casanova and reached number 14 in the UK Singles Chart and No.1 on the Indie Chart The song itself is about a Lothario who is trying to seduce a woman, but she tricks him by asking him to investigate strange noises in the woodshed. Upon entering, he is knocked unconscious by her accomplices who then steal his car and money.

== Release ==
The "Something for the Weekend" single release in the UK came two weeks before Welsh band Super Furry Animals released their own single with the same title, from the album Fuzzy Logic. The latter band changed their title to "Something 4 the Weekend".

== Critical reception ==
In an AllMusic review, critic Matthew Greenwald declared "Something for the Weekend" as "easily one of [Neil] Hannon's most breezy recordings", noting the song's musical style "has a hit of R&B in the percussion" with "energetic drum and piano pattern." Fellow critic Ned Raggett reviewing Casanova, described the song "at once soaring, cheeky, leering, and truly weird."

Reviewing the album in 2016, Pop Rescue said: "The song has a distinct 60's feeling to it – something that the video indulges in too. The lyrics are slick and somewhat quirky (about something in the wood shed – is that a euphemism?), and the backing vocals sit perfectly under Neil's soft speak-singing style. The constant snare beat makes this song feel like it's galloping along."

== Music video ==
The music video was the band's first and is set in Venice.
