= Darren Allison =

English record producer and audio engineer

- Born: May 1968 (age 58); Stakeford, Northumberland, England
- Genres: Pop, rock, folk
- Occupations: Record producer, audio engineer
- Years active: 1987–present
- Website: darrenallison.co.uk

Darren Allison (born May 1968, Ashington, Northumberland, England) is an English record producer, musician, and audio engineer, best known for his production work with artists such as Spiritualized, the Divine Comedy, Bôa, Efterklang, Belle and Sebastian and Amatorski.

== Career ==
=== The Firehouse Studio ===
At the age of 17, Allison moved to London, and began working at The Firehouse Studio in Kentish Town, which was managed by John Cale's guitarist, David Young. Under Young's guidance, he started to develop his craft, assisting on sessions with such artists as the Pogues, Happy Mondays, Ali Farka Touré, Slim Gaillard and Carmel.

=== The Church Studios ===
Following a series of sessions with Dave Stewart at Ezee studios, in 1990 Allison joined Eurythmics' The Church Studios as an in-house engineer. He remained there for five years, working on albums with indie bands such as My Bloody Valentine and Curve, and on Stewart's own sessions with such rock musicians as Mick Jagger, Lou Reed, Bootsy Collins, and occasional visitor Bob Dylan.

=== Freelance ===
In 1995, Allison teamed up with Paul McCartney's band members Wix Wickens and Robbie McIntosh, and producer Paco Trinidad, for the recording of the Spanish diva Luz Casal's most successful album, Como La Flor Prometida, which sold 800,000 copies. During the sessions at London's Battery Studios, Allison also recorded Luz Casal's biggest single, Entre Mis Recuerdos.

Following the Luz Casal project, Allison officially left The Church Studios to concentrate on the production of Neil Hannon's third album under the moniker of the Divine Comedy. The album, entitled Casanova, was released in 1996 and spawned three Top 20 hit singles. He was then invited to work with Spiritualized, on their album, Ladies and Gentlemen We Are Floating in Space.

Allison produced new tracks for rock band Bôa, on their hugely successful Twilight album, including the album's title track.

The following year, he worked with Babybird, co-producing tracks with Stephen Jones, for the U.S. version of their album Ugly Beautiful.

== Selected discography ==
- 1990: BAT – Angel Single (Co-Producer/Engineer/Mixing)
- 1990: The Bombers – Aim High LP (Additional Engineer)
- 1990: Silver Bullet – Bring Down The Walls LP Tracks (Engineer/Mixing)
- 1990: Jesus Jones – Doubt LP tracks (Engineer)

(includes singles "Right Here, Right Now" and "International Bright Young Thing")

- 1990: Peter Blegvad – King Strut & Other Stories LP tracks (Engineer/Mixing)
- 1991: Gheorghe Zamfir – Dances of Romance LP (Engineer)
- 1991: My Bloody Valentine – Loveless LP (Engineer)
- 1992: Stex – Spiritual Dance LP (Engineer/Mixing)

(includes "Still Feel the Rain" Single)

- 1992: Vegas – Vegas LP (Engineer)
- 1992: Savageworld – Timebomb Single (Mixing)
- 1992: Girlschool – Girlschool LP track (Percussion)
- 1993: Eurythmics – Live 1983-1989 LP tracks (Engineer)
- 1993: The Divine Comedy – Liberation LP (Co-Producer/Engineer/Mixing/Drums/Percussion)
- 1993: Ioni – Sentence of Love Single (Mixing)
- 1994: F.O.U.R. – Wait Until Tonight Single (Mixing)
- 1994: Catchers – Cotton Dress Single (Engineer)
- 1994: Catchers – Shifting EP (Engineer)
- 1994: The Almighty – Wrench EP tracks (Engineer/Mixing)
- 1994: Mike TV – Money Shot EP (Producer/Engineer/Mixing)
- 1994: The Divine Comedy – Promenade LP (Co-Producer/Engineer/Mixing/Drums/Percussion)
- 1994: Dave Stewart – Greetings From the Gutter LP (Engineer)

(includes "Heart of Stone" Single)

- 1994: Nick Green – Where Love Is Found EP Track (Engineer)
- 1994: Nick Green – Skeletons LP (Engineer)
- 1995: Luz Casal – Como La Flor Prometida LP (Engineer)

(includes "Entre Mis Recuerdos" Single)

- 1995: Eusebe – "Summertime Healing" Single (Mixing)
- 1995: The Orb feat. Instrumental – Oxbow Lakes EP track (Co-Producer/Engineer/Mixing)
- 1995: Job – Rosary Beads 'n' Ice Cream LP (Engineer/Mixing)
- 1995: Shakespears Sister – Suddenly B Side (Engineer)
- 1995: Eusebe – If Masser Says It's Good Single (Mixing)
- 1995: The Divine Comedy – Casanova LP (Co-Producer/Engineer/Mixing/Drums/Percussion)

(includes singles "Something for the Weekend", "Becoming More Like Alfie", and "Frog Princess")

- 1996: Juan Martín – Musica Alhambra LP (Engineer/Mixing)
- 1996: Right Said Fred – "Big Time" single (Engineer/Mixing)
- 1996: Jazzindo – The Debut Album LP (Engineer/Mixing)
- 1996: Spiritualized – Ladies and Gentlemen We Are Floating in Space LP tracks (Additional Production/Engineer/Mixing)

(includes Electricity Single)

- 1997: Babybird – Ugly Beautiful (US version) LP tracks (Co-Producer/Engineer/Mixing)
- 1996: Clint Bradley – This Hour LP (Associate Producer/Engineer)
- 1997: Jack – The Jazz Age LP (Producer/Engineer/Mixing)

(includes "Steamin'" Single, and "Lolita" EP)

- 1998: Herve Zerrouk – "Anita Emmene-Moi" Single (Mixing)
- 1998: Dominique Dalcan – Ostinato LP tracks (Mixing)
- 1998: Elisa – Cure Me Single (Producer/Engineer/Mixing)
- 1998: Electronic – Twisted Tenderness LP tracks (Engineer)

(includes "Late at Night" Single)

- 1999: Hands on Approach – Blown LP (Producer/Engineer/Mixing)

(includes singles "My Wonder Moon", "Silent Speech" and "Tao Perto Tao Longe")

- 1999: Hands on Approach – Blown SpecialLP Bonus Disc (Producer/Engineer/Mixing)
- 1999: BBMak – Sooner Or Later LP track (Co-Producer/Engineer/Mixing)
- 1999: Phase – 52 Minutes of your time LP (Producer/Engineer/Mixing)

(includes "Get Down" Single)

- 1999: Bôa – Tall Snake EP EP track (Producer/Engineer)
- 1999: BBMak – More Than Words EP track (Co-Producer/Engineer/Mixing)
- 2000: Bôa – Twilight LP tracks (Producer/Engineer)
- 2000: Hands on Approach – Moving Spirits LP (Producer/Engineer/Mixing)

(includes "The Endless Road" Single)

- 2001: Maggiulli – A Bras Le Corps LP (Producer/Engineer/Mixing/Guitar/Keyboards)
- 2002: Juan Martín – Camino Latino LP (Additional Production/Engineer/Mixing)
- 2002: Ten Speed Racer – 10SR LP (Mixing)

(includes singles "Your Demon Heart" and "Fifteen")

- 2002: Orbital – The Bedroom Sessions LP track (Co-Producer/Engineer/Mixing/Drums/Percussion)
- 2002: Belle & Sebastian – Love on the March EP track (Co-Producer/Engineer)
- 2003: Candidate – Under the Skylon LP (Mixing)

(includes singles "Mountain Snow" and "Another One Down")

- 2004: Future Kings of Spain – Le Debemos ep EP tracks (Mixing/Percussion)
- 2005: Luxembourg – LVGB Single (Producer/Engineer/Mixing)
- 2005: Dominique Dalcan – Music-Hall LP tracks (Mixing)
- 2006: Juan Martín – Rumbas Originales LP (Producer/Engineer/Mixing)
- 2006: Electronic – Get the Message – The Best of Electronic LP tracks (Engineer)
- 2007: Efterklang – Parades LP (Mixing)
- 2007: Luz Casal – Vida Toxica LP (Engineer/Mixing)

(includes singles "Se Feliz", "Soy")

- 2008: Efterklang – Caravan Single (Mixing)
- 2011: Amatorski – Tbc LP (Additional Production/Mixing)

(includes "Soldier" Single)

- 2012: The Blue Cats – "Billy Ruffians" Single (Mixing)
- 2012: The Blue Cats – Best Dawn Yet LP track (Mixing)
- 2013: Equinox, the Peacekeeper – Birdsongs on the Wasteland LP (Co-Producer/Engineer/Mixing/Drums/Percussion)
- 2013: Amatorski – "How Are You" Single (Additional Production/Mixing)
- 2013: The Blue Cats – "The Norton Spirit" Single (Additional Production/Mixing)
- 2013: Belle & Sebastian – The Third Eye Centre LP track (Producer/Engineer)
- 2014: Clint Bradley – Riding After Midnight LP (Co-Producer/Engineer/Mixing/Guitar/Percussion)
- 2015: Juan Martín – La Guitarra - Mi Vida LP (Co-Producer/Engineer/Mixing)
- 2015: Daisy Bell – London LP (Co-Producer/Mixing/Radiophonics)
- 2019: Clint Bradley – Soul Of The West LP (Co-Producer/Engineer/Mixing/Programming/Guitar/Percussion/Drums/Mandolin)
- 2021: The Three Funkateers – Busted LP track (Co-Composer/Co-Producer/Engineer/Mixing/Programming/Percussion/Drums/Backing Vocals)
- 2021: Beat Frequency Organization – Radiophonic Soundscapes LP (Co-Composer/Co-Producer/Engineer/Mixing/Programming/Keyboards/Radiophonics)
- 2022: The Divine Comedy – Charmed Life LP tracks (Co-Producer/Engineer/Mixing/Drums/Percussion)
- 2022: Sophie Dunér – Strictly Business LP (Co-Producer/Engineer/Mixing)
- 2022: Clint Bradley – Everything That I Hold Dear Single (Co-Producer/Engineer/Mixing/Programming/Electric Guitar/Acoustic Guitar/Percussion)
- 2023: Beware Of Trains – Forever Home Single (Co-Producer/Engineer/Mixing/Bass Guitar/Percussion)
- 2024: Salvation Fleet – Scars Single (Co-Producer/Engineer/Mixing/Drums/Bass Guitar/Percussion)
