= The Jazz Age (Jack album) =

Studio album by Jack
- Released: 17 August 1998
- Recorded: 1997–1998
- Genre: Alternative rock
- Length: 52:02
- Label: Too Pure
- Producer: Darren Allison

Jack chronology
Pioneer Soundtracks (1996)	The Jazz Age (1998)	La Belle et la Discotheque (2000)

Singles from The Jazz Age
- 1. "Lolita EP" Released: 9 March 1998; 2. "Steamin'" Released: 13 April 1998

Professional ratings
Review scores
Source	Rating
AllMusic	3/5 stars
The Guardian	4/4 stars
Uncut	5/5 stars

The Jazz Age is the second album by the British alternative rock band Jack, released in August 1998. It was recorded in Wales and London in late 1997 and early 1998, and was produced by Darren Allison, who had previously worked with The Divine Comedy and Spiritualized.

It was the band's second - and last - album for the Too Pure label, and the last to feature original members Richard Adderley, Patrick Pulzer, Colin Williams and George Wright.

Despite excellent reviews and extensive touring in support of the album, sales were disappointing. This led in part to the band being dropped by their record label in 1999. "Steamin'" and "Lolita Elle" were released as singles in the UK and Europe, but failed to chart or to pick up significant airplay.

== Track listing ==
1. "3 o'clock in the morning"
2. "Pablo"
3. "My World versus Your World"
4. "Saturday's Plan"
5. "Nico's Children"
6. "Lolita Elle"
7. "Cinematic"
8. "Steamin'"
9. "Love and Death in the Afternoon"
10. "Half Cut, Wholly Yours"
