= I Never Thought This Day Would Come =

Studio album by Duke Special
- Released: 17 October 2008 (Ireland)
- Recorded: Wapping, London; Champaign, Illinois; Cullybackey, County Antrim
- Genre: Rock
- Label: Universal Music Ireland
- Producer: Paul Pilot

Duke Special chronology
Songs from the Deep Forest (2006)	I Never Thought This Day Would Come (2008)	Little Revolutions (2009)

I Never Thought This Day Would Come is the third album by Duke Special, which was released in Ireland by the label Universal Music Ireland on 17 October 2008, and released on soft release in the UK on 20 October 2008.

The album was reviewed by The Irish Times, and a free preview of the album is available from "The Ticket", The Irish Times' weekly entertainment supplement.

== Track listing ==
1. "Mockingbird, Wish Me Luck" – 3:43 (Duke Special and Paul Pilot)
2. "Sweet Sweet Kisses" – 3:03 (Duke Special and Paul Pilot)
3. "Those Proverbs We Made in the Winter Must End" – 2:59 (Duke Special & Bernard Butler)
4. "Diggin' An Early Grave" - 3:17 (Duke Special & Phil Wilkinson)
5. "I Never Thought This Day Would Come" – 3:17 (Duke Special & Phil Wilkinson)
6. "Why Does Anybody Love?" – 3:22 (Duke Special and Paul Pilot)
7. "Flesh And Blood Dance" – 4:02 (Duke Special & Ben Hales)
8. "If I Don't Feel It" – 3:29 (Duke Special and Daniel Benjamin)
9. "Let Me Go (Please Please Please)" – 4:47 (Duke Special and Paul Pilot)
10. "By The Skin of My Teeth" – 3:33 (Duke Special, Paul Pilot & Hettie Bell)
11. "Nothing Comes Easy" – 3:43 (Duke Special, Paul Pilot and Daniel Benjamin)
12. "Nothin' You Could Do Could Bring Me Round" – 3:40 (Duke Special)

=== Bonus tracks ===
Deluxe Edition (also available on Spotify)
No.	Title	Length
13.	"Diggin' An Early Grave" (Live)	2:44
14.	"You Can't Catch Me" (Chuck Berry)	3:20
15.	"Texarkana Baby" (Fred Rose)	2:54
16.	"Monsters in the Dust"	3:09

iTunes Deluxe Edition
No.	Title	Length
13.	"Diggin' An Early Grave" (Live)	2:44
14.	"You Can't Catch Me" (Chuck Berry)	3:20
15.	"Texarkana Baby" (Fred Rose)	2:54
16.	"Monsters in the Dust"	3:09
17.	"Mr. Nobody" (Duke Special)	3:00

7digital
No.	Title	Length
13.	"The Prop Man" (Thomas Truax)	2:40
