= Mother Courage and Her Children (album) =

Studio album by Duke Special
- Released: 28 February 2010
- Genre: Rock/musical theatre
- Length: 36:53
- Label: Reel to Reel

Duke Special chronology
Little Revolutions (2009)	Mother Courage and Her Children (2010)	The Silent World of Hector Mann (2010)

Mother Courage and her Children is a 2010 album by Duke Special, featuring the songs he composed and performed for the National Theatre's 2009 production of Berthold Brecht's play Mother Courage and Her Children, with Brecht's lyrics translated by Tony Kushner.

It was released both on its own and as part of a box set entitled The Stage, A Book And The Silver Screen, which also includes The Silent World of Hector Mann and the Huckleberry Finn EP, funded via the online crowdsourcing platform PledgeMusic.

== Track listing ==
All lyrics are written by Bertolt Brecht, translated by Tony Kushner; all music is composed by Duke Special, except where noted.

No.	Title	Music	Length
1.	"Prelude"		2:55
2.	"Mother Courage"		3:28
3.	"Eilif (Song about the soldier and his wife)"	Duke Special and Paul Pilot	4:07
4.	"Yvette (Song of fraternization)"		3:51
5.	"Song of The Hours"		4:58
6.	"The Great Capitulation"		3:32
7.	"Soldier’s Song"		1:42
8.	"Mother Courage (and the threat of peace)"		1:05
9.	"Cook’s Song"		3:18
10.	"Farmhouse Song"		2:02
11.	"Lullaby"		2:22
12.	"Mother Courage Finale"		3:38
