= Adventures in Gramophone =

Compilation album by Duke Special
- Released: 2005
- Recorded: 2005
- Genre: Rock
- Length: 49:13
- Label: Hag Records
- Producer: Paul Pilot

Duke Special chronology
Your Vandal (2005)	Adventures in Gramophone (2005)	Songs from the Deep Forest (2006)

Professional ratings
Review scores
Source	Rating
RTÉ	3/5 stars
Cross Rhythms	9/10 stars

Adventures in Gramophone is an album by the Northern Ireland based artist Duke Special. It was released on Hag Records in 2005 and collects all twelve tracks from two previous EP releases - Lucky Me and My Villain Heart. It was nominated for the 2006 Choice Music Prize for Irish Album of the Year, losing out to 13 Songs by Julie Feeney.

== Track listing ==
1. "Last Night I Nearly Died (But I Woke Up Just in Time)"
2. "Some Things Make Your Soul Feel Clean"
3. "Freewheel"
4. "As Good As It Gets"
5. "Regarding the Moonlight in Eastbourne"
6. "Kill Me Quickly Please"
7. "I Let You Down (Like a Tonne Weight)"
8. "Wake Up Scarlett"
9. "Closer to the Start"
10. "Don't Breathe"
11. "You Don't Slow Me Down"
12. "Love Is a Series of Scars"

All songs were written by Duke Special, with the exception of "I Let You Down (Like a Tonne Weight)" by Duke Special and Brian Houston.
