= Paul Wilkinson =

Paul Wilkinson may refer to:

- Paul Wilkinson (political scientist) (1937–2011), British political scientist
- Paul Wilkinson (footballer) (born 1964), English retired footballer
- Paul Pilot (born Paul Wilkinson), Northern Irish composer, musician and record producer
- Xav, Irish singer, born Paul Wilkinson, see Romo
