= The Silent World of Hector Mann =

Studio album by Duke Special
- Released: 28 February 2010
- Genre: Rock
- Length: 35:18
- Label: Reel to Reel
- Producer: Steve Albini

Duke Special chronology
Mother Courage and Her Children (2010)	The Silent World of Hector Mann (2010)	Huckleberry Finn EP (2010)

The Silent World of Hector Mann is a 2010 album by Duke Special, featuring songs inspired by the fictional silent film star Hector Mann from Paul Auster's 2002 novel The Book of Illusions, who starred in twelve films before disappearing. Special wrote "Mister Nobody", inspired by the title of one of Mann's films, and sent the novel to eleven songwriters of his acquaintance, asking them each to write a song based on one of the twelve films in a pre-rock and roll style.

The album was produced by Steve Albini and recorded at his Electrical Audio studios in Chicago. It was released both on its own and as part of a box set entitled The Stage, A Book And The Silver Screen, which also includes Mother Courage and Her Children and the Huckleberry Finn EP, funded via the online crowdsourcing platform PledgeMusic.

== Track listing ==
No.	Title	Writer(s)	Length
1.	"Hearth and Home"	Ronnie Mintor	2:30
2.	"Wanda, Darling of the Jockey Club"	Neil Hannon	2:58
3.	"Jumping Jacks"	Ed Harcourt	2:59
4.	"Mister Nobody"	Duke Special	2:59
5.	"Tango Tangle"	Ben Castle	3:25
6.	"You'll be Detective"	Clare Muldaur Manchon	2:47
7.	"Double or Nothing"	Phil Wilkinson	2:12
8.	"Country Weekend"	Paul Pilot	3:13
9.	"Old Folks and Cow Pokes"	Réa Curran	3:14
10.	"The Prop Man"	Thomas Truax	2:40
11.	"Scandal"	Pete Noback	3:17
12.	"Teller's Tale"	Matt Hales	3:11
