= Duke Special =

Northern Irish songwriter and performer

- Duke Special performing in 2007

Background information
- Born: Peter Wilson; 4 January 1971 (age 55); Lisburn, Northern Ireland
- Genres: Alternative rock, baroque pop, chamber pop, folk, soul
- Occupation: Singer-songwriter
- Instruments: Vocals, piano
- Years active: 1999–present
- Labels: Medieval Haircut, Hag, Izumi, V2, Universal Ireland, Reel to Reel, Adventures in Gramophone
- Website: www.dukespecial.com

Duke Special (born Peter Wilson; 4 January 1971) is an Irish songwriter and performer based in Belfast, Northern Ireland. A piano-based songwriter with a romantic style and a warm, distinctly accented voice, he was previously known for his distinctive long dreadlocks, eyeliner and outfits he describes as "hobo chic". Nowadays, he performs mostly out of makeup and desires to be more like his true self. His live performances have a theatrical style inspired by Vaudeville and music hall, and often incorporate 78s played on an old-fashioned gramophone, or sound effects from a transistor radio. He is most often accompanied by percussionist "Temperance Society" Chip Bailey, who plays cheese graters and egg whisks, a Stumpf fiddle and a Shruti box, as well as the more typical drums and cymbals. Other musicians who perform with Wilson from time to time include Paul Pilot (guitar), Réa Curran (trumpet, backing vocals, accordion), Ben Castle (clarinet, saxophone), Ben Hales (bass guitar), Gareth Williams, "Professor" Ger Eaton (keyboards), Dan Donnelly (mandolin, backing vocals) and Serge Archibald III (saxophone, "ethereal background sounds", vibes).

His albums include Adventures in Gramophone (2005), Songs from the Deep Forest (2006), both of which were nominated for the Choice Music Prize, I Never Thought This Day Would Come (2008), Little Revolutions (2009), The Silent World of Hector Mann (2010), Mother Courage and Her Children (2010), Under the Dark Cloth (2011), Oh Pioneer (2012), Look Out Machines! (2015) and Hallow (2017).

== Background ==
Wilson was born in Lisburn and grew up in Coleraine, Downpatrick and Holywood with his mother, father and three sisters. Wilson's grandmother, Mary Groves, taught his mother and her brothers and sisters to play the piano. This tradition of playing the piano was passed on to Wilson's three sisters and eventually to him also. He attended Down High School, Downpatrick and later Sullivan Upper School in Holywood.

After leaving school and a brief stint with a community arts project in Swindon, England he returned home and played piano for Brian Houston (a Belfast songwriter influenced by Bob Dylan, Van Morrison, Bruce Springsteen, Johnny Cash and Elvis) under whom Wilson apprenticed, picking up a hunger for performing and a knack of winning over an audience in the process. Several band mutations on the musical journey followed and saw Wilson front other acts composed of Belfast musicians but he was yet to hit his stride.

He lives in Belfast and has three children.

== Solo work ==
In 2002, he went solo, adopting the name Duke Special, and began building up a following as a live performer. He released three EPs on Medieval Haircut Records, the first two of which, Lucky Me and My Villain Heart, were collected as an album, Adventures in Gramophone, released by Hag Records in 2005. The album was nominated for the 2006 Choice Music Prize. In 2006, he signed to V2 Records and released a second album, Songs from the Deep Forest. He featured on Later... with Jools Holland alongside Amy Winehouse and John Legend the following November and the album was nominated for the 2007 Choice Music Prize. Duke Special was nominated for three 2007 Meteor Music Awards, for best Irish male, best newcomer, and best album for Songs from the Deep Forest. In 2007, he headlined a concert with the Ulster Orchestra at Belfast's Waterfront Hall, "Orchestral Manoevres". The concert was supported by Julie Feeney and Foy Vance, who sang on "This Could Be My Last Day". 2007 also saw him perform at Greenbelt festival, Glastonbury, Guilfest, Summer Sundae, Haldern Festival and the Electric Picnic. Additionally in 2007, he performed as part of the BBC Electric Proms, supporting former Kinks lead singer Ray Davies, and he supported Crowded House during ten tour dates, culminating with a concert at Royal Albert Hall in December.

Duke Special's third album, I Never Thought This Day Would Come, was released in Ireland in October 2008 on Universal, who had acquired V2 in 2007. In August 2008, he appeared on the BBC Northern Ireland television show Sesame Tree with his band, having also written the theme music for the show. Later in 2008, he won the Meteor Music Award for Best Irish Male.

In 2009, he played on the O2 stage at Oxegen and between September and December 2009 appeared on stage at the Royal National Theatre in London as part of a new production of Bertolt Brecht's play Mother Courage and Her Children, for which he wrote music for a number of songs. The production was directed by Deborah Warner and starred Fiona Shaw in the title role. In January 2010, he launched a campaign on Pledge Music (see Fan-funded music) whereby fans pledged for items to help fund the promotion and touring of his triple CD, The Stage, A Book & The Silver Screen (comprising Mother Courage and Her Children, The Silent World of Hector Mann and Huckleberry Finn).

On 11 September 2010, Duke Special played at the Last Night of the Proms for the BBC at Hillsborough Castle. In January 2011, he presented a documentary on the life and songs of Belfast's Ruby Murray and released Duke Special Sings the Songs of Ruby Murray. In March 2011, he performed songs based on the photographs of Alfred Stieglitz, Edward Steichen and Paul Strand at the Metropolitan Museum of Art in New York. These songs were subsequently released in November 2011 as the album Under the Dark Cloth performed alongside The RTÉ Concert Orchestra, conducted by David Brophy, with leader Joanne Quigley and arranged for orchestra by Michael Keeney.

In July 2012, Duke Special released Oh Pioneer on his own label, Adventures in Gramophone, with the help of digital distributor AWAL. It was featured on iTunes, reaching No. 3 on the Singer / Songwriter chart in Ireland and No. 7 in the UK. He appeared at Camp Bestival, performing live sets in both and also debuting as a 78 rpm record DJ, as a guest of the Shellac Collective.

In 2013, he collaborated with Celtic supergroup Clannad, appearing on the album Nádúr and performing on Irish television chat show The Late Late Show and on Terry Wogan's BBC Radio 3 show. On Friday 6 December 2013, he finished a year-long residency of six concerts at Belfast's Empire Hall with 'A Victorian Christmas', performing Christmas songs solo with featured guests.

In July 2017, his official website announced an upcoming album named Hallow, based on the poetry of Michael Longley, with songs from the album to be featured in an October tour of venues in Ireland.

On 3 November 2023, Duke Special released Blood for Ghosts which comprises 10 songs based on old songs discovered in an archive of sheet music in the Princess Grace Irish Library, Monaco.

== Discography ==
=== Early work ===
- Bathroom Floor as Booley (Medieval Haircut/ICC, 1999)
- Garçon Pamplemousse as Benzine Headset (Medieval Haircut, 2001)

=== Albums ===
- Adventures in Gramophone (Hag, 2005) (collects the EPs Lucky Me and My Villain Heart)
- Songs from the Deep Forest (Izumi – Vinyl / V2 – CD, 2006 / V2 Special Edition CD, 2007)
- I Never Thought This Day Would Come (Universal, 2008)
- Mother Courage and Her Children (Reel to Reel Recordings, 2010)
- The Silent World of Hector Mann (Reel to Reel Recordings, 2010)
- Under the Dark Cloth (2011)
- Oh Pioneer (Adventures in Gramophone, 2012)
- Look Out Machines! (2015)
- Hallow (2017)
- A Note Let Go (with Ulaid) (2017)
- Blood for Ghosts (2023)

=== Compilations ===
- Little Revolutions (Reel to Reel Recordings, 2009):)
- Little Revolutions Two (Reel to Reel Recordings, 2011)

=== EPs ===
- Lucky Me (Medieval Haircut Records, 2002)
- My Villain Heart (Medieval Haircut Records, 2004)
- Your Vandal (Hag Records, 2005)
- Huckleberry Finn (Reel to Reel Recordings, 2009)
- Duke Special Sings the Songs of Ruby Murray (Charity three-Track EP, 2011)

=== Live albums ===
- Orchestral Manoeuvres in Belfast (V2, 2008)

=== Singles ===
- "Freewheel" (Hag / Izumi Records, 2005)
- "Portrait" (V2, 2006)
- "Last Night I Nearly Died (But I Woke Up Just in Time)" (V2, 2006)
- "Wake Up Scarlett" (V2, 2006) (iTunes download only)
- "Freewheel" (V2, 2007) IRE No. 15
- "Last Night I Nearly Died (But I Woke Up Just in Time)" (V2, 2007)
- "Our Love Goes Deeper Than This" (V2, 2007) (featuring Neil Hannon and Romeo Stodart, download only)
- "No Cover Up" (V2, 2007)
- "Sweet Sweet Kisses" (Universal Music, 2008)
- "Condition" (2012)
- "1969" (Visual Independent Productions, 2013)
- "Nail On The Head" (2015)

=== Other contributions ===
- One (Myrrh, 2000) – "Peace Has Broken Out" – duet with Moya Brennan
- Acoustic 07 (V2, 2007) – "This Could Be My Last Day"
- Ceol '09 – "Tochailt Uaighe go Róluath" (a version of "Digging an Early Grave" in the Irish language)
- Theatre production of Mother Courage and her Children 2009 at the Royal National Theatre
- Music from BBC TV's Sesame Tree, 2008–2011
