= Look Out Machines! =

Studio album by Duke Special
- Released: 6 April 2015
- Studios: Echo Zoo Studios, Eastbourne
- Genres: Pop rock, alternative rock
- Length: 39:54
- Label: Stranger Records Ltd
- Producers: Phil Wilkinson & Dave Izumi

Duke Special chronology
Oh Pioneer (2012)	Look Out Machines! (2015)	Hallow (2017)

Professional ratings
Review scores
Source	Rating
Head Stuff	4/5 stars
musik express	2.5/6 stars
Drowned in Sound	5/10 stars
theregoesthefear	8/10 stars
musikreviews.de	8/15 stars

Look Out Machines! is a studio album by Northern Irish recording artist Duke Special. It was released on 6 April 2015 by Stranger Records Ltd.

== Track listing ==
All tracks are written by Duke Special (with listed collaborators)

No.	Title	Writer(s)	Length
1.	"Wingman"	with Phil Wilkinson	4:26
2.	"Elephant Graveyard"	with Iain Archer	2:49
3.	"Step To the Magical"	with Wilkinson	3:38
4.	"In a Dive"	with Jonathan Quarmby & David Saw	3:54
5.	"Statues"	with Boo Hewerdine	4:00
6.	"Son of the Left Hand"	with Wilkinson	3:32
7.	"Look Out Machines!"	with Gary Clark & Wilkinson	4:01
8.	"Nail On the Head"	with Wilkinson	3:45
9.	"Tweed Coats"	with Paul Pilot	2:20
10.	"Stepping Stones"	with Fiona Harte	3:41
11.	"Domino"	with Quarmby & Saw	3:49
