= Bathroom Floor =

Studio album by Booley
- Released: 15 August 2000
- Genre: Rock
- Label: Medieval Haircut Records / ICC Records

Booley chronology
Lemonade (1997)	Bathroom Floor (2000)

Bathroom Floor is an album record by the Northern Ireland based artist Booley, now known as Duke Special. The record was released on Medieval Haircut Records in 2000.

== Track listing ==
1. "Bathroom Floor"
2. "Tesco Queen"
3. "Alright"
4. "My Little Glory"
5. "Day After Disaster"
6. "God on your Side"
7. "Patrick Moore"
8. "Drown"
9. "Candyfloss Spine"
10. "Let Me Bleed"
11. Untitled hidden track

All songs were written by Booley, with the exception of "Alright" by Booley and Andrew Mitchell.
