= Huckleberry Finn (EP) =

EP by Duke Special
- Released: 2010
- Genre: Rock/musical theatre
- Length: 14:14
- Label: Reel to Reel

Duke Special chronology
The Silent World of Hector Mann (2010)	Huckleberry Finn (2010)	Little Revolutions Two (2011)

Huckleberry Finn is a 2010 EP by Duke Special, featuring songs composed by Kurt Weill with lyrics by Maxwell Anderson from an unfinished musical based on Mark Twain's 1884 novel Adventures of Huckleberry Finn. It was released both on its own and as part of a box set entitled The Stage, A Book And The Silver Screen, which also includes the albums Mother Courage and Her Children and The Silent World of Hector Mann.

Vocals were provided by Beth Rowley (track 5), with backing vocals by Smoke Fairies and Stuart Barbour.

== Track listing ==
1. River Chanty
2. Come in, Mornin'
3. Apple Jack
4. This Time Next Year
5. Catfish Song
