= Under the Dark Cloth =

Studio album by Duke Special
- Released: 29 November 2011
- Genres: Blues, blues rock, rock
- Length: 44:36

Duke Special chronology
Duke Special Sings the Songs of Ruby Murray (2011)	Under the Dark Cloth (2011)	Oh Pioneer (2012)

Professional ratings
Review scores
Source	Rating
The Irish Times	4/5 stars
tollbooth.org	4/5 stars

Under the Dark Cloth is the sixth studio album by Northern Irish recording artist Duke Special. It was self-released on 29 November 2011. It is the result of an invitation by the Department of Photography of the Metropolitan Museum of Art in New York to write a suite of songs inspired by the work of pioneering photographers Paul Strand, Alfred Stieglitz and Edward Steichen. The songs were co-written by Duke Special and Boo Hewerdine, with the exception of "You Press the Button and We’ll Do the Rest" which was co-written by Duke Special and Neil Hannon, and are accompanied in the recording by the RTÉ Concert Orchestra performing arrangements by Irish composer and arranger Michael Keeney.

== Track listing ==
All tracks are written by Duke Special and Boo Hewerdine, except where noted.

No.	Title	Writer(s)	Length
1.	"Dancing Trees"		2:58
2.	"Hand of Man"		3:24
3.	"Rita De Acosta"		3:10
4.	"Spiritual America"		3:26
5.	"Cherry Blossom Girl"		3:43
6.	"Cloudgod"		5:48
7.	"Washerwoman"		4:10
8.	"Georgia O'Keeffe"		3:10
9.	"You Press the Button and We’ll Do the Rest"	Duke Special and Neil Hannon	3:49
10.	"In Memoriam"		4:07
11.	"Triumph of the Egg"		4:07
12.	"This Is All That Matters"		2:44
