= Anna Handler =

German conductor and concert pianist (born 1996)

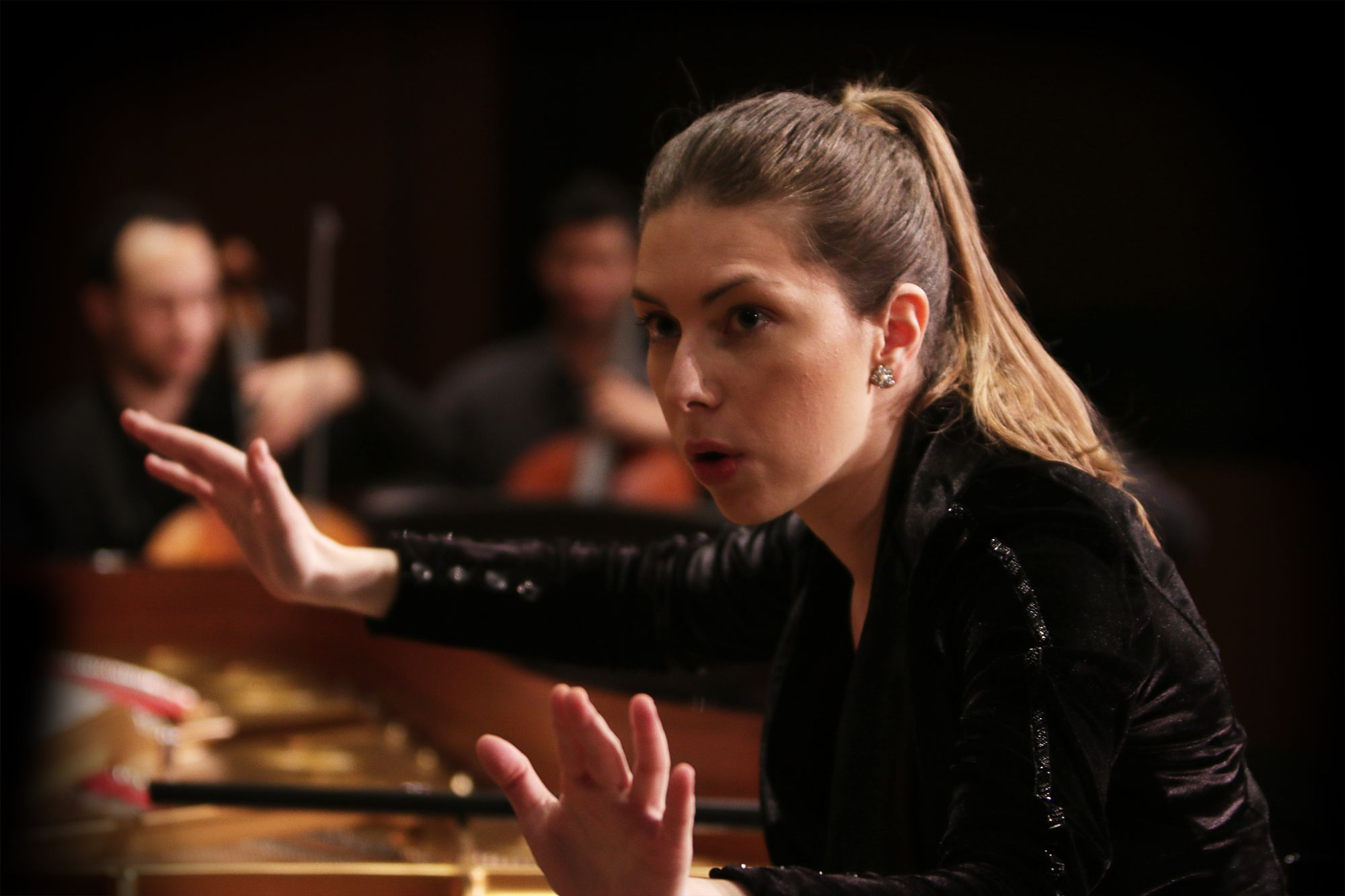
- Handler in 2019
- Born: 16 April 1996 (age 30); Cagnes-sur-Mer, France
- Occupations: Conductor, pianist
- Website: annahandler.com/index.php?lang=en

Anna Isabella Handler (born 16 April 1996) is a German conductor and concert pianist. Handler is currently assistant conductor of the Boston Symphony Orchestra and chief conductor-designate of the Ulster Orchestra.

== Biography ==
Handler was born to a German father and a Colombian mother in Cagnes-sur-Mer, France, where her parents worked as engineers. She grew up in Munich, Germany, and initially formed a singing duo with her younger sister Laura. Handler studied piano and conducting with Ingrid Fliter at the Accademia Pianistica di Imola, with Adrian Oetiker at the University of Music and Performing Arts Munich, with Henri Sigfridsson at the Folkwang University of the Arts in Essen, with Nicolás Pasquet and Ekhart Wycik at the University of Music Franz Liszt Weimar, and with Pavel Gililov at the Musikakademie in Liechtenstein.

Handler and her sister Laura have performed as a piano-violin duo. Handler founded the ensemble Enigma Classica in 2019. Musical projects by Handler and Enigma Classica have included collaborations with such musicians as Arabella Steinbacher, Daniel Müller-Schott, and Sabine Meyer, as well as an interdisciplinary project on music education, featuring real-time generative video animation at the Young Artist Festival Bayreuth in August 2022. Her work has garnered her the Maria Ladenburger Förderpreis. She has also served as an conducting assistant at the Bayerische Staatsoper, working with Oksana Lyniv on such productions as Eva und Adam, which premiered as part of the 2019 Munich Opera Festival. She made her Salzburg Festival conducting debut in 2022 with Káťa Kabanová, and returned in subsequent years for Ravel's L'enfant et les sortilèges (2023) and Orff's Die Kluge (2024).

Handler continued her music studies in the USA at the Juilliard School, where her teachers included David Robertson. She was awarded the Juilliard Kovner Fellowship for outstanding students of classical music, the first conducting student to receive the fellowship. She graduated from Juilliard in 2023 with an MM (Master of Music) degree. Handler subsequently became a Dudamel Conducting Fellow with the Los Angeles Philharmonic for the 2023-2024 season. In September 2024, Handler became assistant conductor of the Boston Symphony Orchestra. She made her Tanglewood Festival conducting debut with the orchestra in August 2025, and her subscription concert debut with the orchestra at Symphony Hall (Boston) in November 2025.

In September 2025, Handler first guest-conducted the Ulster Orchestra. In November 2025, the orchestra announced the appointment of Handler as its next chief conductor, effective with the 2026-2027 season, with an initial contract of three years. Handler is the second female conductor to be named chief conductor of the Ulster Orchestra.

In March 2026, the Beethoven House in Bonn announced the appointment of Handler as its artist-in-residence for the 2026-2027 season. In April 2026, the Los Angeles Philharmonic announced the appointment of Handler as its conductor-in-residence, effective with the 2026–2027 season, with an annual three-week commitment that includes appearances at Walt Disney Concert Hall, the Hollywood Bowl, and the Beckmen YOLA Center, as well as a yearly project with YOLA (Youth Orchestra Los Angeles).

== Honours and awards ==
- 2018: Prizewinner of the International Hans von Bülow Competition (in the discipline "Conducting from the piano")
- 2019: Rising Star Award from the European Cultural Foundation Europamusicale
- 2020: Maria-Ladenburger-Förderpreis
- 2023: Juilliard Kovner Fellowship

Cultural offices
Preceded by Daniele Rustioni (music director)	Chief Conductor, Ulster Orchestra; 2026–present	Succeeded by incumbent
