= Songs from the Deep Forest =

Studio album by Duke Special
- Released: May 2006 (vinyl), October 2006 (CD)
- Length: 42:59
- Label: V2
- Producer: Dave Lynch and Paul Pilot

Duke Special chronology
Adventures in Gramophone (2005)	Songs from the Deep Forest (2006)	I Never Thought This Day Would Come (2008)

Professional ratings
Review scores
Source	Rating
AllMusic	link
Drowned in Sound	link
The Guardian	link

Songs from the Deep Forest is an album by Northern Irish singer-songwriter Duke Special. In May 2006, it was released as a limited edition set of six 7" vinyl discs and then re-released as a single CD in October of the same year. It was nominated for a 2007 Meteor Music Award for best Irish album, and for the 2007 Choice Music Prize.

On October 1, 2007, a special two-disc edition was released, which included the new song "Our Love Goes Deeper Than This", featuring Neil Hannon and Romeo Stodart. The bonus disc included songs from a live BBC performance recorded in Belfast.

== Track listing ==
All songs written by Duke Special, except where otherwise indicated.

1. Wake Up Scarlett
2. Everybody Wants a Little Something
3. Brixton Leaves (Duke Special, Ben Hales)
4. Freewheel
5. No Cover Up
6. Portrait
7. Last Night I Nearly Died (But I Woke Up Just in Time)
8. Ballad of a Broken Man
9. Salvation Tambourine
10. Something Might Happen
11. Slip of a Girl (Paul Wilkinson)
12. This Could Be My Last Day
- Earlier versions of "Last Night I Nearly Died (But I Woke Up Just in Time)", "Freewheel" and "Wake up Scarlett" appeared on Adventures in Gramophone, and an earlier version of "Portrait" appeared on the Your Vandal EP.

=== Bonus version ===
A special "Bonus Version of the Album" contains two additional tracks:

1. Salvation Tambourine (Demo)
2. And It Stoned Me (Live) (Van Morrison)

=== Special edition ===
==== Disc 1 ====
1. Wake Up Scarlett
2. Everybody Wants a Little Something
3. Brixton Leaves (Special, Hales)
4. Our Love Goes Deeper Than This (Special, Wilkinson) - featuring Neil Hannon and Romeo Stodart
5. Freewheel
6. No Cover Up
7. Portrait
8. Last Night I Nearly Died (But I Woke Up Just in Time)
9. Ballad of a Broken Man
10. Salvation Tambourine
11. Something Might Happen
12. Slip of a Girl (Wilkinson)
13. This Could Be My Last Day

==== Disc 2 ====
1. Overture (BBC Live Version) (Andrew Skeet)
2. Brixton Leaves (BBC Live Version) (Special, Hales)
3. Last Night I Nearly Died (BBC Live Version)
4. Portrait (BBC Live Version)
5. Wake Up Scarlett (BBC Live Version)
6. Regarding the Moonlight in Eastbourne (BBC Live Version)
7. Salvation Tambourine (BBC Live Version)
8. No Cover Up (BBC Live Version)
9. I Let You Down (BBC Live Version) (Special, Brian Houston)
10. Freewheel (BBC Live Version)
