= My Villain Heart =

EP by Duke Special
- Released: 2004
- Genre: Rock
- Label: Medieval Haircut Records

Duke Special chronology
Lucky Me (2002)	My Villain Heart (2004)	Your Vandal (2005)

My Villain Heart is an EP record by the Northern Ireland-based artist Duke Special. The record was released on Medieval Haircut Records in 2004, and features six tracks. It is included with Lucky Me and Your Vandal Heart in a box set released together with the Little Revelations album in December 2009.

== Track listing ==
1. Last Night I Nearly Died (But I Woke Up Just in Time)
2. Some Things Make Your Soul Feel Clean
3. Regarding the Moonlight in Eastbourne
4. Wake Up Scarlett
5. You Don't Slow Me Down
6. Love is a Series of Scars

All songs were written by Duke Special. The tracks were subsequently also released on the 2005 album Adventures in Gramophone.
