= Orchestral Manoeuvres in Belfast =

Live album by Duke Special
- Released: 2008
- Recorded: 3 May 2007; Waterfront Hall
- Label: V2 Records

Duke Special chronology
| Little Revolutions (2008) | Orchestral Manoeuvres in Belfast (2008) | I Never Thought This Day Would Come (2008) |

Orchestral Manoeuvres in Belfast is a 2008 Duke Special live album.

The concert of the same name was held on 3 May 2007 at the Waterfront Hall, featuring Special with the Ulster Orchestra.

== Track listing ==
1. Overture
2. Brixton Leaves
3. Last Night I Nearly Died
4. Portrait
5. Wake Up Scarlett
6. Regarding the Moonlight in Eastbourne
7. Salvation Tambourine
8. No Cover Up
9. I Let you Down
10. Freewheel
