= Oh Pioneer =

Studio album by Duke Special
- Released: 9 July 2012
- Genre: Blues rock, alternative rock
- Length: 46:21
- Label: Adventures in Gramophone
- Producer: Paul Pilot & Dave Lynch

Duke Special chronology
Under the Dark Cloth (2011)	Oh Pioneer (2012)	Look Out Machines! (2015)

Professional ratings
Review scores
Source	Rating
BBC Music	8/10 stars
AU Magazine	8/10 stars
The Arts Desk	4/5 stars
musicOMH	4/5 stars
This Is Fake DIY	7/10 stars
The Irish Times	6/10 stars

Oh Pioneer is the seventh studio album by Northern Irish recording artist Duke Special. It was released on 9 July 2012 by Duke Special's own record label Adventures in Gramophone.

== Track listing ==
All tracks are written by Duke Special (except where noted).

No.	Title	Length
1.	"Stargazers of the World Unite (A Love Song for Astronomers) (Special / Paul Pilot)"	4:51
2.	"Little Black Fish (Special / Rocky O' Reilly)"	5:12
3.	"Punch of a Friend"	3:49
4.	"Snakes in the Grass"	3:06
5.	"Condition (Special / Boo Hewerdine)"	4:44
6.	"Nothing Shall Come Between Us"	2:42
7.	"Lost Chord"	4:42
8.	"My Lazy Saviour (Special / Phil Wilkinson)"	4:37
9.	"How I Learned to Love the Sun (Special / Phil Wilkinson)"	3:35
10.	"Always Been There (Special / Phil Wilkinson)"	4:15
11.	"Twice Around the Island"	4:48
