= Rafael Payare =

Venezuelan conductor

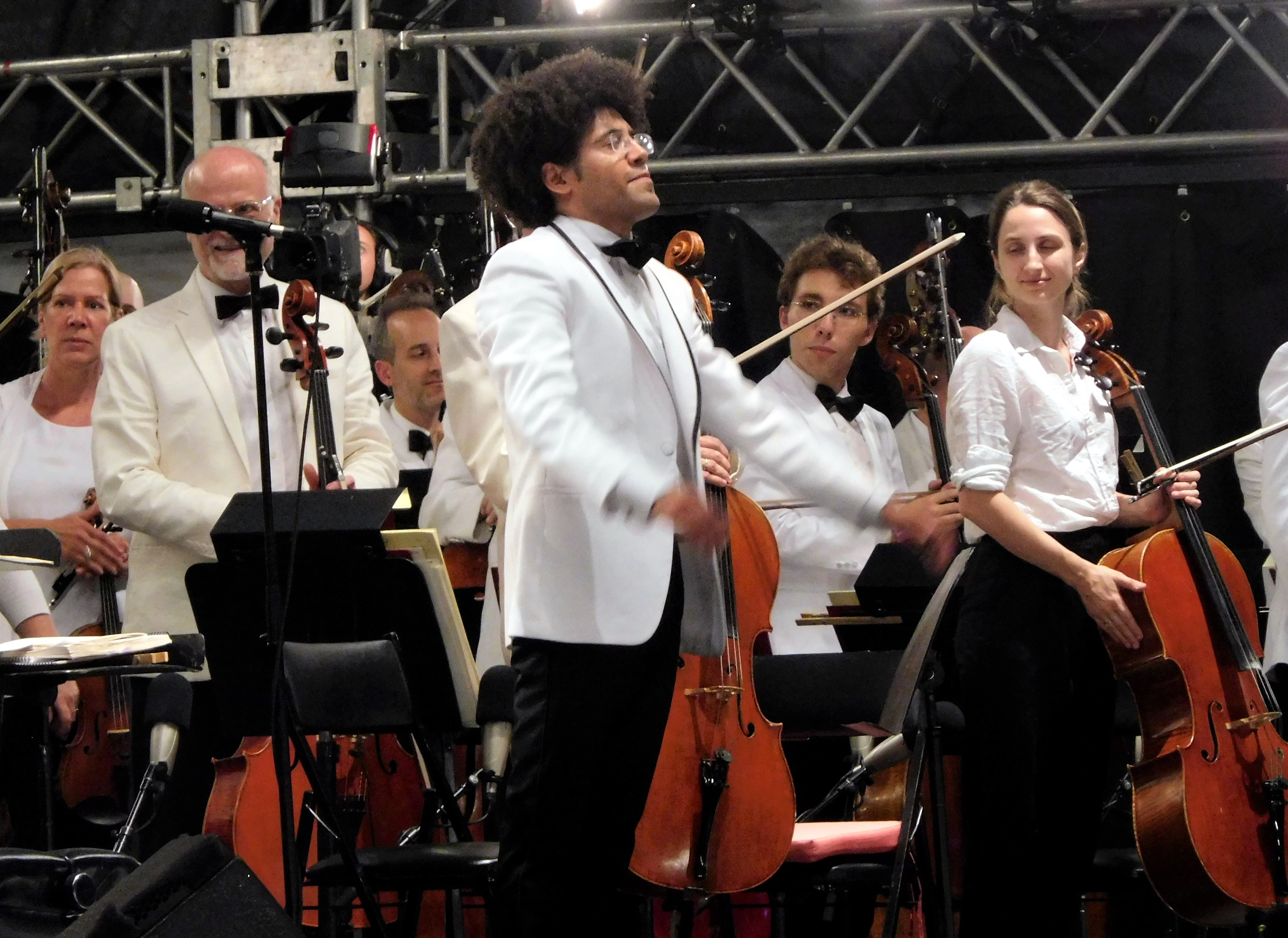
- in Montreal, August 10, 2022
- Born: February 23, 1980 (age 46); Puerto la Cruz, Venezuela
- Occupation: conductor
- Spouse: Alisa Weilerstein (m. 2013)
- Children: 2 daughters
- Parents: Juan R. Payare (father); Trina Torres de Payare (mother)

Rafael Payare (born 23 February 1980) is a Venezuelan conductor and a graduate of El Sistema, Venezuela’s social action music programme.

== Background ==
Born in Puerto la Cruz, Venezuela, Payare's parents were Trina Torres de Payare, an elementary school teacher, and Juan R. Payare, a cartographer for the city. He began his music studies at age 14 at the Núcleo in Puerto la Cruz, learning the French horn. He graduated from the Universidad Nacional Experimental de Las Artes. He and his brother Joel each joined El Sistema. Payare eventually became principal horn of the Simón Bolívar Symphony Orchestra.

In 2004, Payare began conducting studies with José Antonio Abreu. He won first prize at the Malko Competition for Young Conductors in May 2012, He subsequently became an assistant conductor to Claudio Abbado during Abbado's work with the Simón Bolívar Symphony Orchestra, and to Daniel Barenboim at the Staatsoper Berlin.

In October 2013, Payare first guest-conducted the Ulster Orchestra. On the basis of this appearance, the orchestra announced his appointment as its 13th chief conductor, effective with the 2014–2015 season, his first lead orchestral post. In October 2016, the orchestra announced a contract extension through the 2018–2019 season, and also a change in his title from chief conductor to music director. Payare concluded his tenure with the Ulster Orchestra at the close of the 2018–2019 season, and now has the title of conductor laureate of the orchestra.

In the United States, Payare worked as an assistant to Lorin Maazel at the Castleton Festival. Following Maazel's death in 2014, Payare became principal conductor of the festival in 2015. In January 2018, Payare first guest-conducted the San Diego Symphony. On the basis of this concert, the San Diego Symphony named Payare as its next music director, effective 1 July 2019 with an initial four-year contract. Payare assumed the title of music director-designate with immediate effect. In October 2020, the San Diego Symphony announced an extension of Payare's contract as music director through the 2025–2026 season and in November 2025, his contract was extended again through the 2028-2029 season with the new title of Music and Artistic Director.

Payare first guest-conducted the Montreal Symphony Orchestra (OSM) in 2018. He returned as a guest conductor of the OSM in 2019. In January 2021, the OSM announced the appointment of Payare as its next music director, effective with the 2022–2023 season, with an initial contract of 5 seasons. He held the title of music director-designate for the 2021–2022 season. In April 2026, the OSM announced the extension of Payare's contract as its music director through the 2031-2032 season.

Payare conducted the Simón Bolívar Symphony Orchestra during its appearance at the 2023 Edinburgh International Festival.

== Musical style ==
In performance, Payare often conducts from memory. He explained, "It’s very important you don’t have your head in the score, but the score in your head. That way you don’t have a wall between you and the musicians. If you are just looking at the score and not what is happening, you may not see that somebody in the orchestra needs a little more time to take a breath. The contact is much better when everybody is locked in together".

== Personal life ==
Payare and the American cellist Alisa Weilerstein married on 18 August 2013. They have two daughters.

Cultural offices
Preceded by JoAnn Falletta	Principal Conductor and Music Director, Ulster Orchestra; 2014–2016 (Principal Conductor), 2016–2019 (Music Director)	Succeeded by Daniele Rustioni
Preceded by Lorin Maazel	Principal Conductor, Castleton Festival; 2015–present	Succeeded by incumbent
Preceded by Jahja Ling	Music Director, San Diego Symphony; 2019–present	Succeeded by incumbent
