= Elmwood Hall =

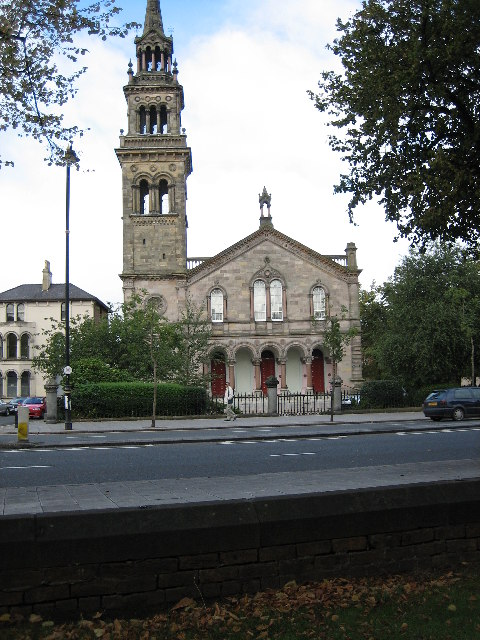

- Location within Greater Belfast

General information
- Coordinates: 54.584186°N 5.937349°W

Elmwood Hall is a concert hall and former Presbyterian church on University Road in Belfast, Northern Ireland. It is situated opposite Queen's University Belfast.

== History ==
Elmwood Hall was built originally as the Elmwood Presbyterian Church. It was designed in 1859 by amateur architect John Corry, but not actually erected until 1862.

The pulpit and other internal furnishings were removed, along with the stained glass windows. The stonework was restored and the golden weathercock was added by HA Patton & Partners in 1975. The polished granite pillars around the front courtyard had lost some of their elaborately carved sandstone capitals, but these were restored in 2000.

Queen's University Belfast converted the church into a concert hall and renamed it Elmwood Hall. The building was deconsecrated and for a time became the home of the Ulster Orchestra.

Following the closure of the Queen's University Student Union for redevelopment, the Mandela Hall team will be relocating many of their live concerts, comedies and student events to the Elmwood Hall until Mandela Hall re-opens in 2021-2022 within the new Student Centre.

== Architecture ==
The building has a mixture of styles, principally Italianate with a spire on top of a campanile. It has been described as one of Ulster's best High Victorian church designs – a triumph of eclecticism, where the combination of apparently discordant elements such as a Renaissance arcade with chunky Venetian columns, mediaeval machicolations, a classical cornice and balustrade, a Moorish well canopy and a French needle spire are all absorbed into a coherent but very elaborate Irish version of a Lombard Gothic church (Irish Builder).

Behind the polychrome freestone façade, the interior is surprisingly large, having a great width uninterrupted by roof supports, and a deep gallery running back over both vestibule and loggia, reached by a winding staircase beneath the tower (which, while part of the 1859 design, was added in 1872).
