= Maurice Miles =

English conductor (1908-1985)

Maurice Miles (1908 – 26 June 1985) was an English conductor known for championing the music of twentieth century British composers.

== Biography ==
=== Early life and studies ===
Miles was educated at Wells Cathedral School and won a scholarship to the Royal Academy of Music, where he studied violin, voice and piano. He later studied conducting at the Mozarteum University Salzburg under Clemens Krauss.

=== Career ===
In the 1930s, Miles worked for the BBC as well as in Bath, conducting the Pump Room Orchestra. During the Second World War Maurice Miles served for a time as a Recce car driver in the 24th Lancers, and was the conductor of the 29th Armoured Brigade Orchestra. Miles was appointed principal conductor of the newly formed Yorkshire Symphony Orchestra in 1947 and remained in that post until 1954. The orchestra was known for its adventurous programming during his tenure, including contemporary British music, Janáček’s Glagolitic Mass, and a rare performance of Arthur Honegger's oratorio King David.

In 1955 Miles was appointed conductor of the City of Belfast Orchestra, a large part-time symphony orchestra made up of members from the BBC Northern Ireland orchestra and local players. In 1966 the Arts Council of Northern Ireland decided to establish the Ulster Orchestra, a fully professional orchestra of 37 players. Miles was heavily involved in the creation of this new orchestra was appointed its first principal conductor. Despite some successes in the inaugural season, in 1967 unrest within the orchestra prompted Miles to resign his post.

Throughout his career Miles was a frequent guest conductor at the BBC Proms concerts and with BBC orchestras throughout the UK. He was professor of conducting at the Royal Academy of Music and in 1977 published a handbook on conducting.

=== Personal life ===
Maurice Miles was married to Eileen Spencer Wood and had one son and two daughters.

=== Writings ===
- Miles, Maurice (1977). Are you beating two or four?. Novello.
