= Nicholas Whitman =

American photographer

- Born: United States
- Education: RIT
- Known for: Photography
- Notable work: Landscape photography, nature studies, and historic photography, especially involving themes of decay.
- Website: nwphoto.com

Nicholas Whitman is an American photographer. He is best known for his work chronicling the decay and transformations of buildings, as well as his nature studies. His most recent work’s basis is the physical world, but more as an "evocative interpretation rather than a literal one." "Subject intersects with intangibles like mood. Symbols speak across cultures and through time." These themes are manifest in the painting of Albert Pinkham Ryder, a recent focus of Whitman's. Whitman’s show “After Ryder” at the New Bedford Whaling Museum from 2018-2019 was an homage to the spirit of the painter, and in 2020 another show will exhibit Whitman's work alongside Ryder's.

Whitman began photographing North Adams’ abandoned Sprague Electric Company factory in 1988 “because it would surely be razed.” Documenting the then-deteriorating 19th-century mill buildings, Whitman captured scenes ranging from vast postindustrial landscapes to minute traces of the plant’s former workers. Whitman’s meticulously composed photographs—windows onto the historic nature of Massachusetts Museum of Contemporary Art’s celebrated renovated factory campus—are currently on display in the museum and accompanied by an expanded catalog, A PLACE REMOVED. Whitman has had a long association with the museum; his earlier MASS MoCA: From Mill to Museum (2001) documented its initial creation from the husk of the sprawling electronics plant.

Similarly, Whitman's 2008 book, The Colonial Theatre: A Pittsfield Resurrection, showcases the transformation of the Miller Supply Company of Pittsfield, Massachusetts into an architectural jewel.

A graduate of RIT's photography program, Whitman was Curator of Photography at the New Bedford Whaling Museum from 1978 to 1986. In addition to his independent work, he was an instructor at Williams College's winter studies program between 2003-2018.

== Selected publications ==
- 2019. After Ryder: Photographs.
- 2019. A PLACE REMOVED: After Sprague Electric/Before MASS MoCA.
- 2016. Circus Posters: Historic Posters Come to Light.
- 2013. The Stutz Stash of A. K. Miller.
- 2013. Sea, Shore, Sky & Ice.
- 2013. Squares from Nature.
- 2008. The Colonial Theatre: A Pittsfield Resurrection.
- 2001. MASS MoCA: From Mill to Museum.
- 1997. A Window Back: Photography in a Whaling Port.
