= Daniele Rustioni =

Italian conductor

Daniele Rustioni (born 18 April 1983) is an Italian conductor.

== Biography ==
Rustioni was born in Milan, and studied piano, organ, and composition at the Milan Conservatory. He sang in the boys choir of the Teatro alla Scala in his youth. He studied cello for 3 years, and later piano and organ.

Rustioni studied conducting under Gilberto Serembe at the Milan Conservatory and under Gianluigi Gelmetti at the Accademia Musicale Chigiana. Whilst at the Royal Academy of Music in London, his mentors included Gianandrea Noseda, who gave him the opportunity to make his debut as a conductor with the orchestra of the Teatro Regio in Turin in 2007. For 2008–2009, Rustioni was a Jette Parker Young Artist at the Royal Opera House, Covent Garden. He then became an assistant conductor to Antonio Pappano at Covent Garden, and served in the post for 3 years. Rustioni made his U.S. debut in July 2011 conducting Cherubini's Médée at the Glimmerglass Festival.

Rustioni became principal guest conductor of the Orchestra della Toscana in 2011. In June 2014, Rustioni became the orchestra's principal conductor. He stood down as the orchestra's principal conductor at the close of the 2019–2020 season. He retains his post as artistic director of the orchestra.

In March 2015, the Opéra national de Lyon announced the appointment of Rustioni as its next principal conductor, effective September 2017. The company elevated Rustioni's title to music director as of 2022. Rustioni stood down as music director of the company at the close of the 2024-2025 season and now has the title of chef musical émérite ('music director emeritus') with the company. During his Lyon tenure, Rustioni was also principal guest conductor with the Bavarian State Opera from 2021 to 2023.

In January 2019, the Ulster Orchestra announced the appointment of Rustioni as its next chief conductor, effective September 2019, following 3 prior appearances as guest conductor with the orchestra. In September 2022, the orchestra announced simultaneously the extension of Rustioni's contract to 2024 and the immediate elevation of his title to music director. Rustioni concluded his tenure as music director of the Ulster Orchestra at the close of the 2023-2024 season and now has the title of music director laureate with the orchestra.

Rustioni first guest-conducted at the Metropolitan Opera in 2017. In November 2024, the Metropolitan Opera announced the appointment of Rustioni as its next principal guest conductor, effective with the 2025-2026 season, with an initial contract of three seasons. In September 2025, the Tokyo Metropolitan Symphony Orchestra announced the appointment of Rustioni as its next principal guest conductor, effective April 2026.

Rustioni is married to the Italian-American violinist Francesca Dego. The couple have together recorded violin concertos of Paganini and Wolf-Ferrari for Deutsche Grammophon, where the recording of the Wolf-Ferrari violin concerto was taken from the UK premiere performance in Birmingham, with the City of Birmingham Symphony Orchestra. For Sony Classical, Rustioni has recorded music of Giorgio Federico Ghedini, and an album of opera arias with Erwin Schrott.

Cultural offices
Preceded by Kazushi Ono	Principal Conductor and Music Director, Opéra National de Lyon; 2017–2022 (Principal Conductor), 2022-2025 (Music Director)	Succeeded by (post vacant)
Preceded by Rafael Payare	Chief Conductor and Music Director, Ulster Orchestra; 2019–2022 (Chief Conductor), 2022–2024 (Music Director)	Succeeded by Anna Handler (chief conductor)
