= Ulster Orchestra =

Symphony orchestra based in Belfast

- Orchestra
- Founded: 1966; 60 years ago
- Location: Belfast, Northern Ireland
- Concert hall: Ulster Hall; Waterfront Hall
- Principal conductor: Anna Handler
- Website: www.ulsterorchestra.com

The Ulster Orchestra is a full-time professional orchestra in Northern Ireland. Based in Belfast, the orchestra plays the majority of its concerts in Belfast's Ulster Hall and Waterfront Hall. It also gives concerts across the United Kingdom and the Republic of Ireland, including performances at the Belfast Festival, the BBC Proms, the Wexford Opera Festival, the Kilkenny Arts Festival, and the National Concert Hall, Dublin. The orchestra currently employs 63 full-time musicians and 17 administrative support staff.

== History ==
The orchestra was founded in 1966 by the Arts Council of Northern Ireland, with Maurice Miles as its first principal conductor, János Fürst as its first leader, and Donald Froud as its first general manager. Fürst later became the orchestra's assistant conductor. The orchestra replaced the semi-professional City of Belfast Symphony Orchestra, which was subsequently disbanded. From 1966 the Ulster Orchestra consisted of 37 players and existed in this form until 1981, when the BBC Northern Ireland Orchestra (BBC NIO) was disbanded. The Ulster Orchestra Society Ltd was then established (a company limited by guarantee and a registered charity) with funding from the Arts Council of Northern Ireland, the BBC, Belfast City Council and Gallaher Ltd., and the size of the Orchestra was increased with to 55 players from the disbanded BBC NIO.

Past Principal Conductors have included Bryden Thomson, Vernon Handley, Yan Pascal Tortelier, Dmitry Sitkovetsky, Thierry Fischer, and Kenneth Montgomery. Handley also held the title of Conductor Laureate from 2003 until his death in 2008. Principal guest conductors of the orchestra have included Paul Watkins. JoAnn Falletta was principal conductor of the orchestra from 2011 to 2014, the first American and the first female conductor to hold the post. In January 2014, the orchestra announced the appointment of Rafael Payare as its 13th chief conductor, effective with the 2014–2015 season. In October 2016, the orchestra announced the extension of Payare's contract through the 2018–2019 season, and also a change in his title from chief conductor to music director. In February 2018, the orchestra announced that Payare is to stand down as its music director at the close of the 2018–2019 season.

In January 2019, the orchestra announced the appointment of Daniele Rustioni as its next chief conductor, effective September 2019, following 3 prior appearances by Rustioni as guest conductor with the orchestra. In September 2022, the orchestra announced simultaneously the extension of Rustioni's contract to 2024 and the immediate elevation of his title to music director. Also in September 2022, the orchestra announced the appointment of Auveen Sands as its next chief executive, the first woman named to the post, effective at the end of October 2022, in succession to Richard Wigley. Rustioni concluded his tenure as the orchestra's music director at the close of the 2023–2024 season and now has the title of music director laureate of the orchestra.

In September 2025, Anna Handler first guest-conducted the orchestra. In November 2025, the orchestra announced the appointment of Handler as its next chief conductor, effective with the 2026-2027 season, with an initial contract of three years. Handler is the second female conductor to be named chief conductor of the Ulster Orchestra.

Past Associate Composers with the orchestra have included Brian Irvine, and the current Associate Composer is Ian Wilson. Past chief executive officers of the orchestra have included David Byers, who was named as interim chief executive in June 2002, and was formally named to the position in March 2003, initially for a 5-year contract. He retired from the post in September 2010, after which Dick Mackenzie became interim chief executive. Declan McGovern was chief executive on secondment from the BBC between January 2011 and March 2012. Ed Smith was interim chief executive between July and December 2012. Rosa Solinas was chief executive between February 2013 and March 2014.

The orchestra has made commercial recordings for such labels as Chandos, Naxos Records and Toccata Classics.

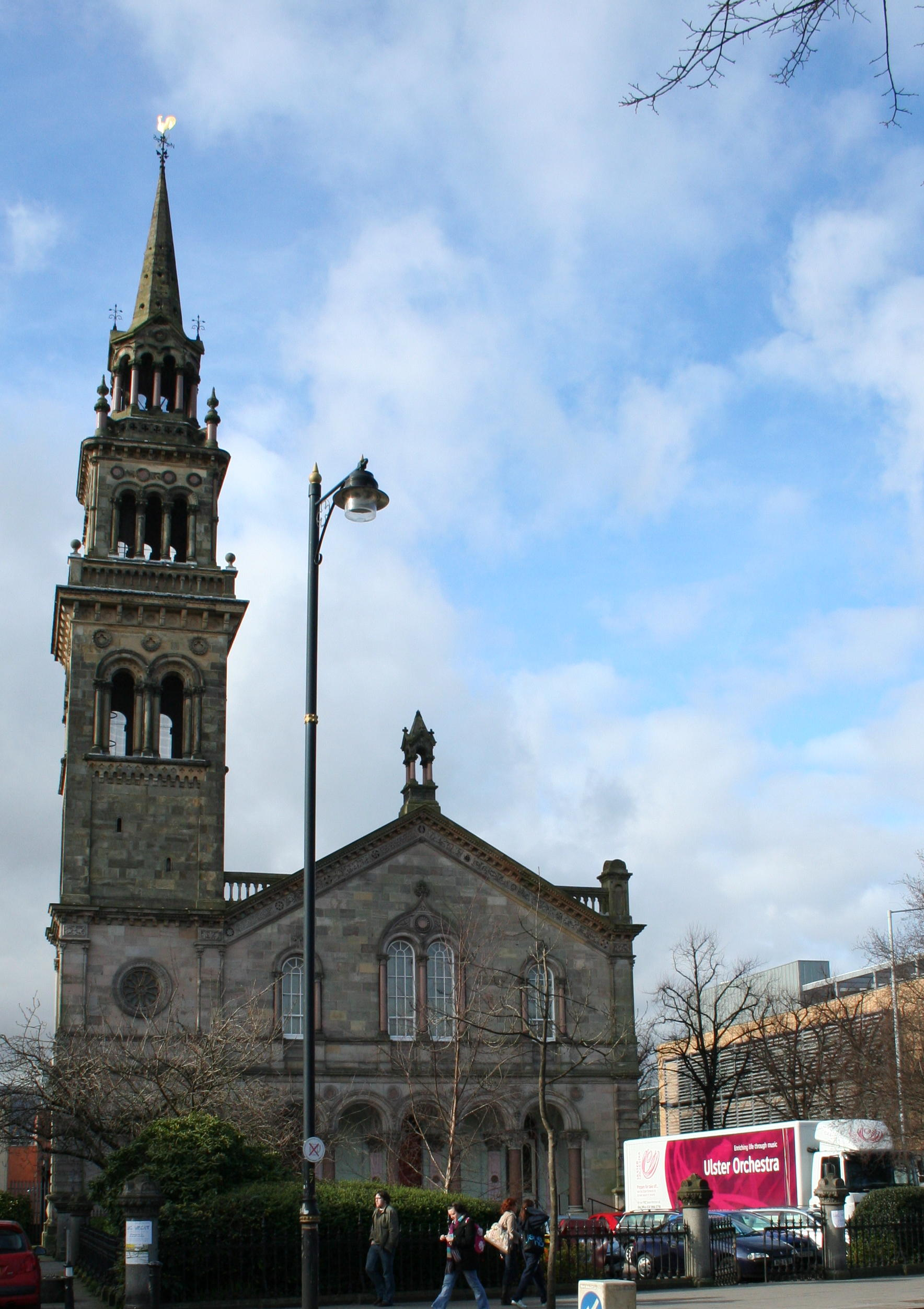
Preparing for a concert at the Elmwood Hall, Belfast

== Funding ==
The Ulster Orchestra Society Ltd receives core funding from the Arts Council of Northern Ireland and Belfast City Council. Through an agreement with the BBC, the UOS receives significant payments for a specified number of broadcast recordings (an essential and vital part of the funding equation). The BBC maintains exclusive distribution rights over the performances which it records. These are broadcast locally on Radio Ulster, and nationally on BBC Radio 3.

Further funding comes from Lottery awards for Audience Development and New Works, from local councils for concerts and education work, from the Department of Culture, Arts and Leisure for capital works and touring, and from a number of Trusts and Foundations for specific projects for staffing.

Other key sources of income include Box Office receipts, programme sales and advertising, corporate sponsors (including additional funding from Arts and Business), Friends' subscriptions, Gift Aid and private philanthropic donations, including legacies.

The orchestra's annual turnover in 2001/02 was in excess of £3.4 million. Byers has guided the orchestra through recent financial issues, including the increase of a grant from the Arts Council of Northern Ireland from GB £1.34 million (2002) to £1.69 million (2003) and to £2.05 million (2008).

In October 2014, it was reported that the orchestra could be forced to close, having lost 28% of its public funding. Belfast City Council has been asked to back a rescue plan which includes a £500,000 funding guarantee and free use of the Ulster Hall. On 23 November 2014, the orchestra held a flash mob in St George's market to raise awareness of their funding problem and to ask for support. In late November, Belfast City Council offered £100,000 as a conditional pledge to the orchestra, if additional funding can be raised from other sources and the orchestra offers a plan for addressing a projected 2015 deficit of £850,000.

== Education and community outreach ==
The Ulster Orchestra undertakes a number of outreach projects, including workshops in schools throughout Northern Ireland, pre-concert talks and instrument master-classes. The Orchestra received the Royal Philharmonic Society's first award for an education project (in West Belfast). Recent major cross-community projects involving Belfast schools in areas of social deprivation have included Gulliver in 2005, A Marvellous Medicine in 2007 and The Pied Piper in 2009. Brian Irvine, then the Orchestra's Associate Composer, composed the music for these last two projects. The Pied Piper project was awarded the Inspire Mark of the 2012 London Cultural Olympiad.

== Principal conductors ==
- Maurice Miles (1966–1967)
- Sergiu Comissiona (1967–1969)
- Edgar Cosma (1969–1974)
- Alun Francis (1974–1976)
- Bryden Thomson (1977–1985)
- Vernon Handley (1985–1989)
- Yan Pascal Tortelier (1989–1992)
- En Shao (1992–1995)
- Dmitry Sitkovetsky (1996–2001)
- Thierry Fischer (2001–2006)
- Kenneth Montgomery (2007–2010)
- JoAnn Falletta (2011–2014)
- Rafael Payare (2014–2019)
- Daniele Rustioni (2019–2024)
- Anna Handler (2026–present)

== Commissions ==
Through its BBC work and/or with help from the Arts Council of Northern Ireland Lottery Fund, there have been many commissions for composers in Ireland and Northern Ireland, including Greg Caffrey, Ciarán Farrell, Elaine Agnew, Gerald Barry, Michael McGlynn, Derek Bell, David Byers, Bill Campbell, Donnacha Dennehy, Stephen Gardner, Deirdre Gribbin, Philip Hammond, Piers Hellawell, Rachel Holstead, Marion Ingoldsby, Brian Irvine, Frank Lloyd, Neil Martin, Kevin O'Connell, Ian Wilson and Paul Wilson.

Commissioned GB composers include Mark Bowden, Edward McGuire, Stephen McNeff, John Tavener, Adrian Thomas and Malcolm Williamson. Commissioned composers from outside the UK and Ireland include Lyell Cresswell, Rodion Shchedrin, Pawel Szymanski and Kevin Volans.

== See also ==
- Orchestral Manoeuvres in Belfast
