= Massachusetts Museum of Contemporary Art =

Museum in North Adams, Massachusetts, US

MASS MoCA
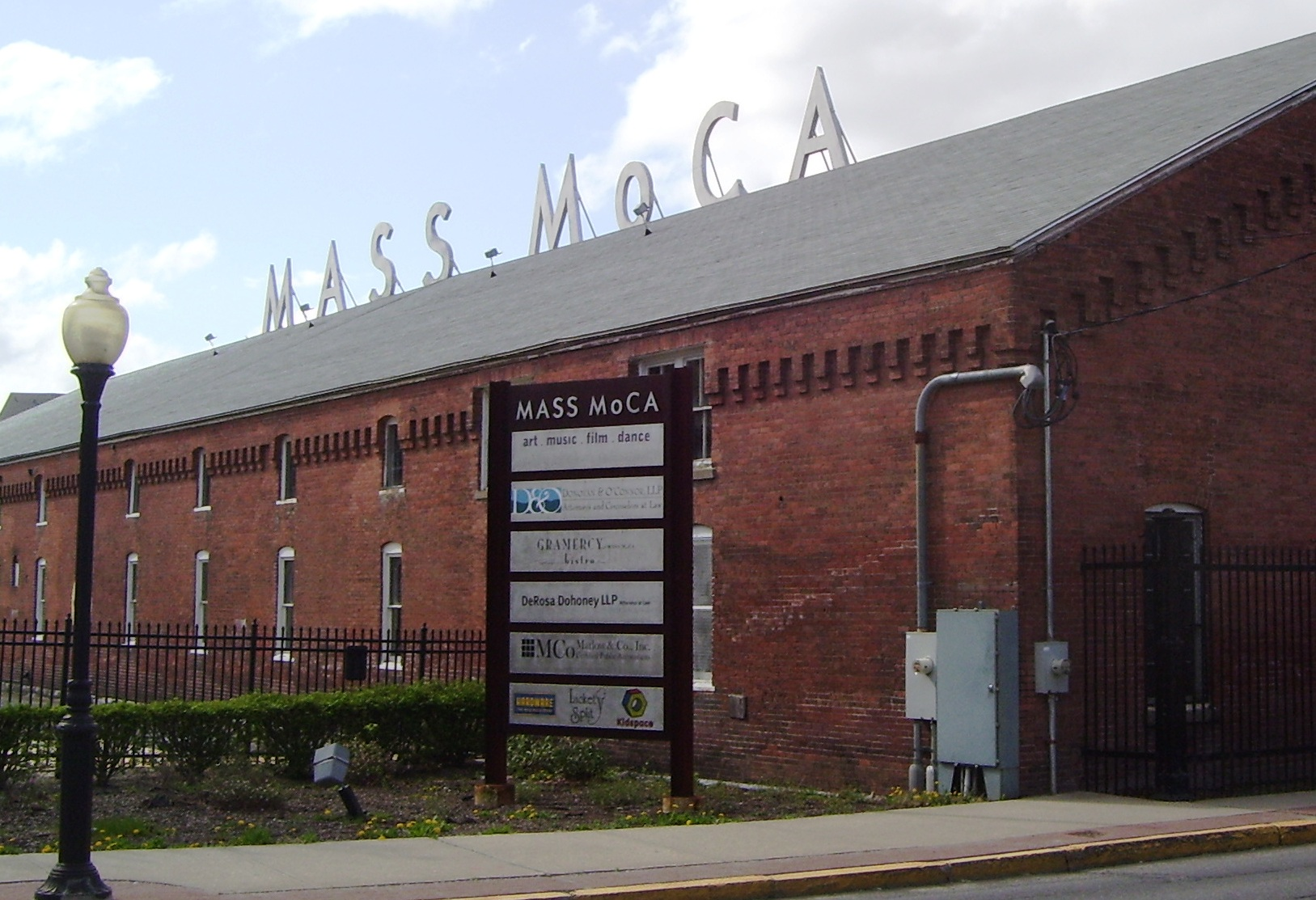
- Established: 1999
- Location: North Adams, Massachusetts
- Director: Kristy Edmunds
- Website: www.massmoca.org

- Arnold Print Works
- U.S. National Register of Historic Places
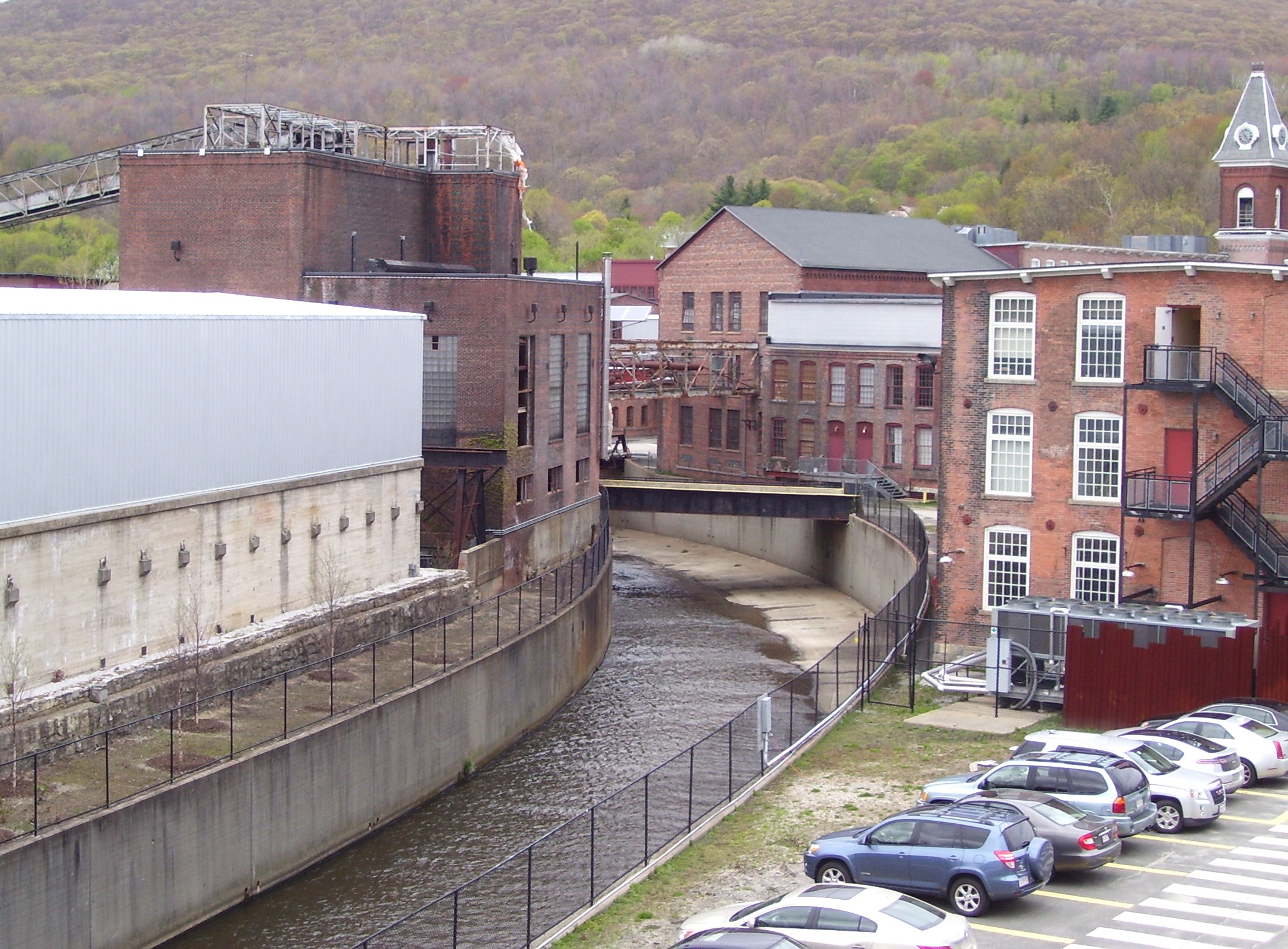
- Buildings of the Arnold Print Works, now MASS MoCA, along a tributary of the Hoosic River (2012)

- Location within Massachusetts Location within the United States
- Location: 87 Marshall St., North Adams, Massachusetts
- Coordinates: 42°42′5″N 73°6′59″W
- Area: 24 acres (9.7 ha)
- Built: 1872
- Architectural style: Italianate Industrial
- MPS: North Adams MRA
- NRHP reference No.: 85003379
- Added to NRHP: October 25, 1985

The Massachusetts Museum of Contemporary Art (MASS MoCA) is a museum within the converted Arnold Print Works factory building complex in North Adams, Massachusetts. It is one of the largest centers for contemporary visual art and performing arts in the United States.

Built by the Arnold Print Works, which operated on the site from 1860 to 1942, the complex was used by the Sprague Electric company before its conversion. MASS MoCA originally opened with 19 galleries and 100,000 sq ft (9,300 m^{2}) of exhibition space in 1999. It has expanded since, including the 2008 expansion of Building 7 and the May 2017 addition of roughly 130,000 square feet when Building 6 was opened.

In addition to housing galleries and performing arts spaces, it also rents space to commercial tenants. It is the home of the Bang on a Can Summer Institute, where composers and performers from around the world come to create new music. The festival, started in 2001, includes concerts in galleries for three weeks during the summer. Starting in 2010, MASS MoCA has become the home for the Solid Sound Music Festival.

MASS MoCA, along with the Clark Art Institute and the Williams College Museum of Art (WCMA), forms a trio of significant art museums in the northern Berkshires.

== Museum location and history ==
=== Arnold Print Works ===
The buildings that MASS MoCA now occupies were originally built between 1870 and 1900 by the company Arnold Print Works. These buildings, however, were not the first to occupy this site. Since colonial times small-scale industries had been located on this strategic peninsular location between the north and south branches of the Hoosic River. In 1860 the Arnold brothers arrived at this site and set up their company with the latest equipment for printing cloth. They began operating in 1862 and quickly took off. Aiding their success were large government contracts during the Civil War to supply cloth for the Union Army.

In December 1871, a fire swept through the Arnold Print Works factory and destroyed eight of its buildings. Rebuilding started almost immediately and an expanded complex was finished in 1874. Despite a nationwide depression during the 1870s Arnold Print Works purchased additional land along the Hoosic River and constructed new buildings. By 1900, every building but one in today's Marshall Street complex was constructed. In 1892, Arnold Print Works purchased the design of the Ithaca Kitty stuffed toy, which sold 200,000 units that holiday season and became a national fad.

At its peak in 1905, Arnold print works employed more than 3,000 workers and was one of the world's leading producers of printed textiles. Arnold produced 580,000 yards or 330 miles of cloth per week. Arnold had offices in New York City and Paris. In addition to printing the textiles, Arnold Print Works expanded and built their own cloth-weaving facilities in order to produce "grey cloth", which was the crude, unfinished textile from which printed color cloth was made.

In 1942 Arnold Print Works was forced to close its doors and leave North Adams due to the low prices of cloth produced in the South and abroad, as well as the economic effects of the Great Depression.

=== Sprague Electric Company ===
Robert C. Sprague's (son of Frank J. Sprague) Sprague Electric Company was a local North Adams company, and it purchased the Marshall Street complex to produce capacitors. During World War II Sprague operated around the clock and employed a large female workforce—not only due to the lack of men, but also because it took small hands and manual dexterity to construct the small, hand-rolled capacitors. In addition to manufacturing electrical components, Sprague had a large research and development department. This department was responsible for research, design, and manufacturing of the trigger for the atomic bomb and components used in the launch systems for the Gemini space missions.

At its peak during the 1960s, Sprague employed 4,137 workers in a community of 18,000. Essentially the factory was a small city within a city with employees working alongside friends, neighbors and relatives. The company was almost completely self-sufficient, holding a radio station, orchestra, vocational school, research library, day-care center, clinic, cooperative grocery store, sports teams, and a gun club with a shooting range on the campus.

In the 1980s, Sprague began to face difficulties with global changes in the electronics industry. Cheaper electronic components were being produced in Asia combined with changes in high-tech electronics forced Sprague to sell and shutdown its factory in 1985. As a result, North Adams was left "deindustrialized" and found itself on a steep economic decline.

The site was formerly listed as a superfund contaminated site. The complex was listed on the National Register of Historic Places in 1985.

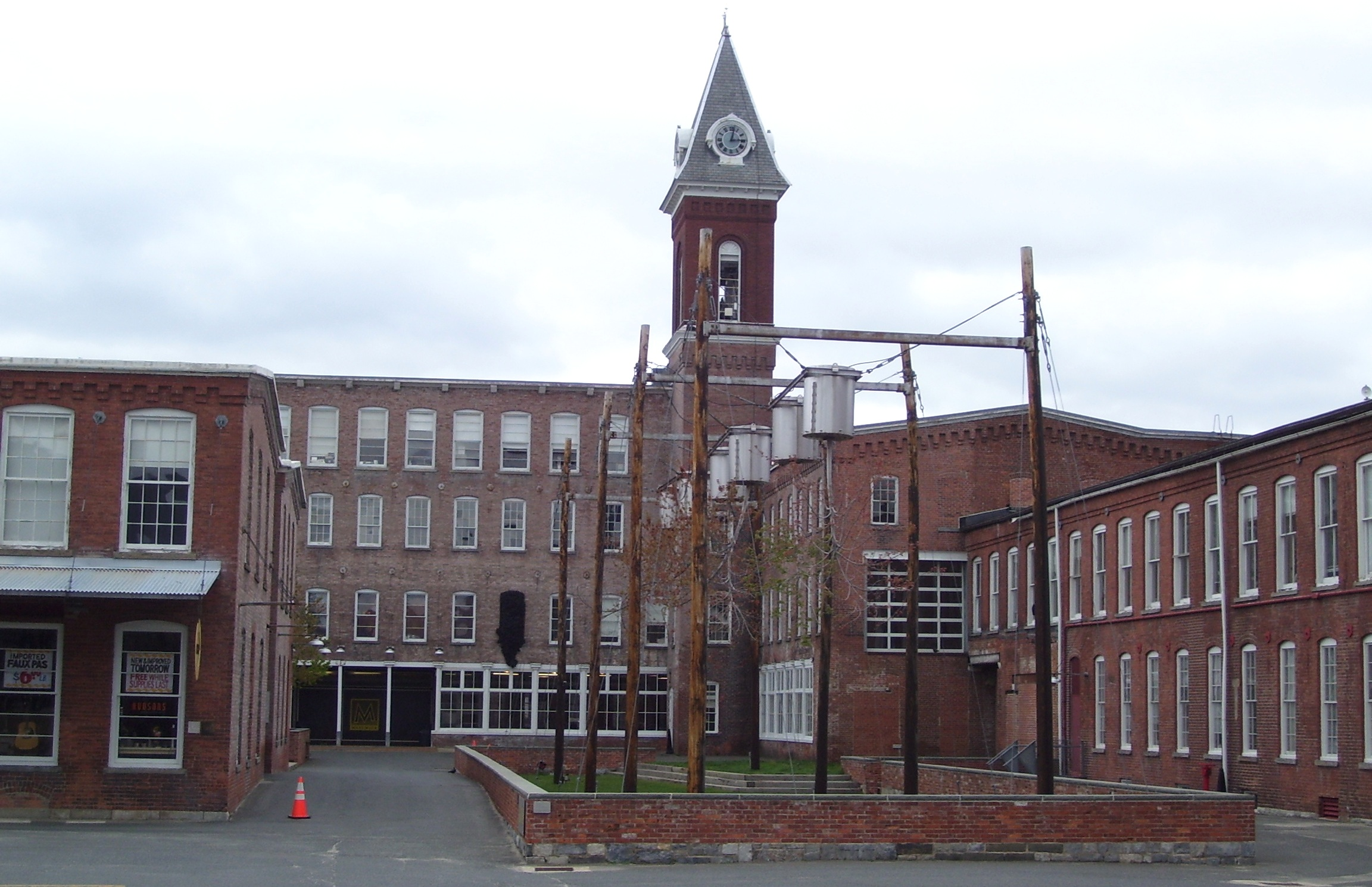
The main entrance to the museum, with the campanile tower on the right (2012)

=== MASS MoCA ===
The development of MASS MoCA began a year after Sprague vacated the buildings. In 1986, a group of staff from the nearby Williams College Museum of Art were looking for large factory or mill buildings where they could display and exhibit large works of modern and contemporary art that they weren't able to display in their more traditional museum/gallery setting. They were directed to the Marshall Street complex by the mayor of North Adams. When they spent time with the space, they quickly realized the buildings had much more potential than an offshoot gallery. The process for MASS MoCA began.

It took a number of years of fund-raising and organization to develop MASS MoCA. During this process the project evolved to create not only new museum/gallery space but also a performing arts venue. The transformation was chronicled by photographer Nicholas Whitman's Mass MoCA: From Mill to Museum. The museum was granted $18.6 million by the Commonwealth of Massachusetts after a public/private coalition petitioned the state government to support the project. Local residents and businesses contributed $8 million to the project. In 1999 MASS MoCA opened its doors.

In May 2007, the museum became embroiled in a legal dispute with Swiss installation artist Christoph Büchel. The museum had commissioned Büchel to create a massive installation, "Training Ground for Democracy", the exhibit was to include a rebuilt movie theater, nine shipping containers, a full-size Cape Cod–style house, a mobile home, a bus, and a truck. On May 21, 2007, MASS MoCA filed a one-count complaint in the United States District Court for the District of Massachusetts's Judge Michael A. Ponsor, stating that the museum was entitled to present to the public Büchel's art installation without the artist's consent.

Büchel claimed that allowing the public to view it in an unfinished state and without his permission would misrepresent his work, infringe his copyrights, and infringe his moral rights granted under U.S. law, specifically, the 1990 Visual Artists Rights Act. Contrary to Büchel's allegation, the museum alleged that Büchel did not respond to requests by the museum to come and remove the materials. On September 21, 2007, Judge Ponsor of the Federal District Court for Massachusetts in Springfield ruled that there was no copyright violations and no distortion inherent in showing an unfinished work as long as it was clearly labeled as such. Judge Ponsor noted that his opinion would likely not be viewed as creating a legal precedent. Although the museum was granted permission to exhibit Büchel's art installation without his consent, it chose not to do so. Büchel appealed the district court's ruling, and in January 2010 the United States Court of Appeals for the First Circuit overruled Judge Ponsor, finding that the Visual Artists Rights Act applies to unfinished works of art, and that Büchel asserted a viable claim under the Copyright Act that MASS MoCA violated his exclusive right to display his work publicly.

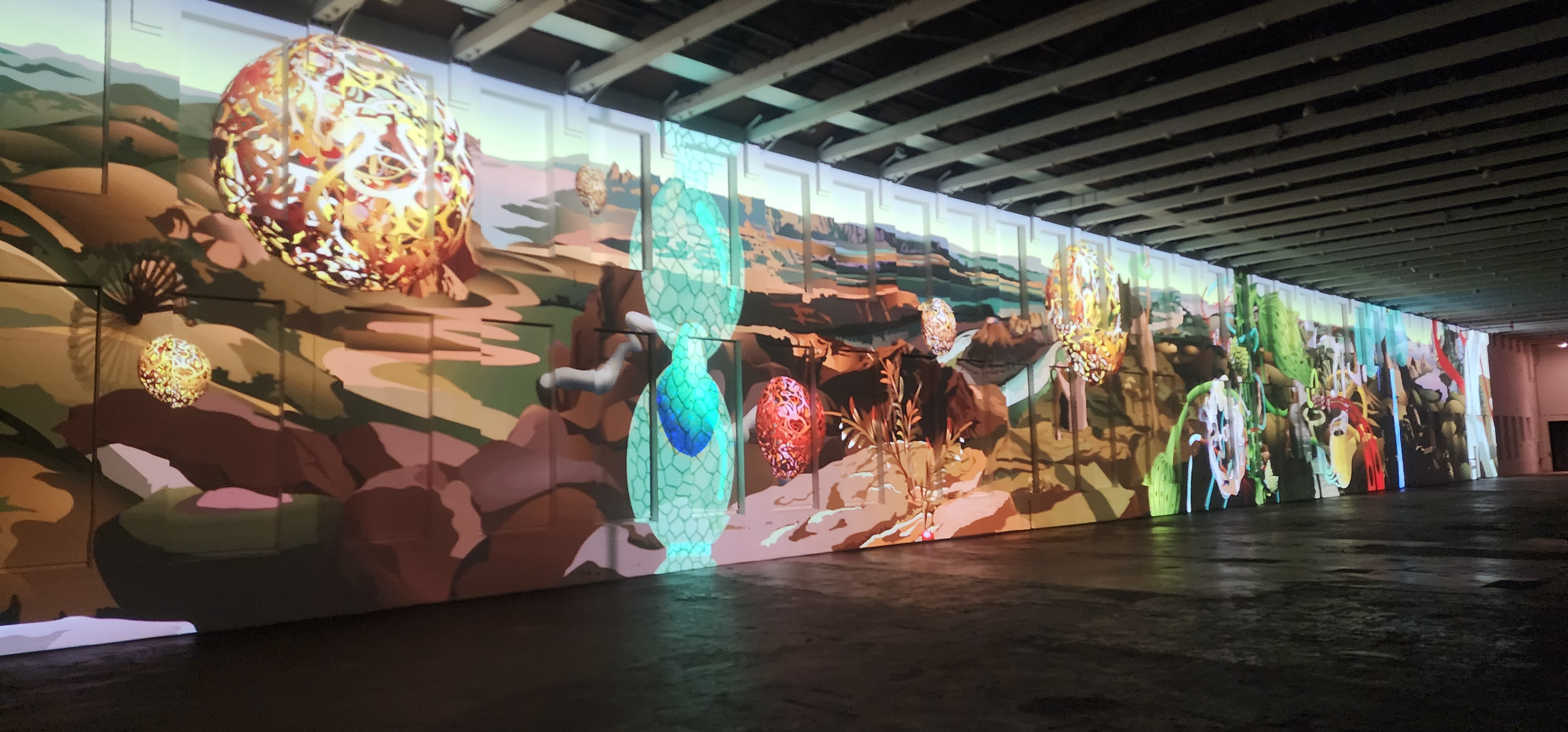
The Coast of Industry by Chris Doyle, a 300-foot digital animation.

On November 16, 2008, the museum opened an exhibition of Sol LeWitt wall drawings in partnership with Yale University Art Gallery and Williams College Museum of Art. The exhibition, Sol LeWitt: A Wall Drawing Retrospective occupies a 27,000-square-foot (2,500 m^{2}) building located at the center of the campus. More than 100 monumental wall drawings and paints conceived by the artist from 1968 to 2007 will be on view through 2033. Cambridge-based Bruner/Cott & Associates converted the historic mill building and worked with LeWitt to design the gallery space. LeWitt designed the final placement of the drawings before his death in April 2007, and the drawings were installed by a team of draftsmen between April 1 and September 30, 2008. The exhibition was chosen as the "top museum exhibition of 2008" by Time Magazine.

Designed by the Cambridge architecture firm of Bruner Cott & Assoc, it was awarded highest honors by the American Institute of Architects and The National Trust for Historic Preservation. In 2015, an Assets for Artists residency program began providing artists and writers business coaching and studio space at the museum and at Maker's Mill, a collaborative workspace founded that year to bring to downtown North Adams the "artisanal work that once formed the manufacturing economy of the region, fiber arts and printing." On May 29, 2017, Building 6 was opened as gallery space, adding some 130,000 square feet of exhibition space. The museum is the subject of the 2018 documentary film Museum Town.

== Directors ==
- 1999–2021: Joe Thompson
- 2021–present: Kristy Edmunds

== See also ==
- National Register of Historic Places listings in Berkshire County, Massachusetts
