= Museum Town =

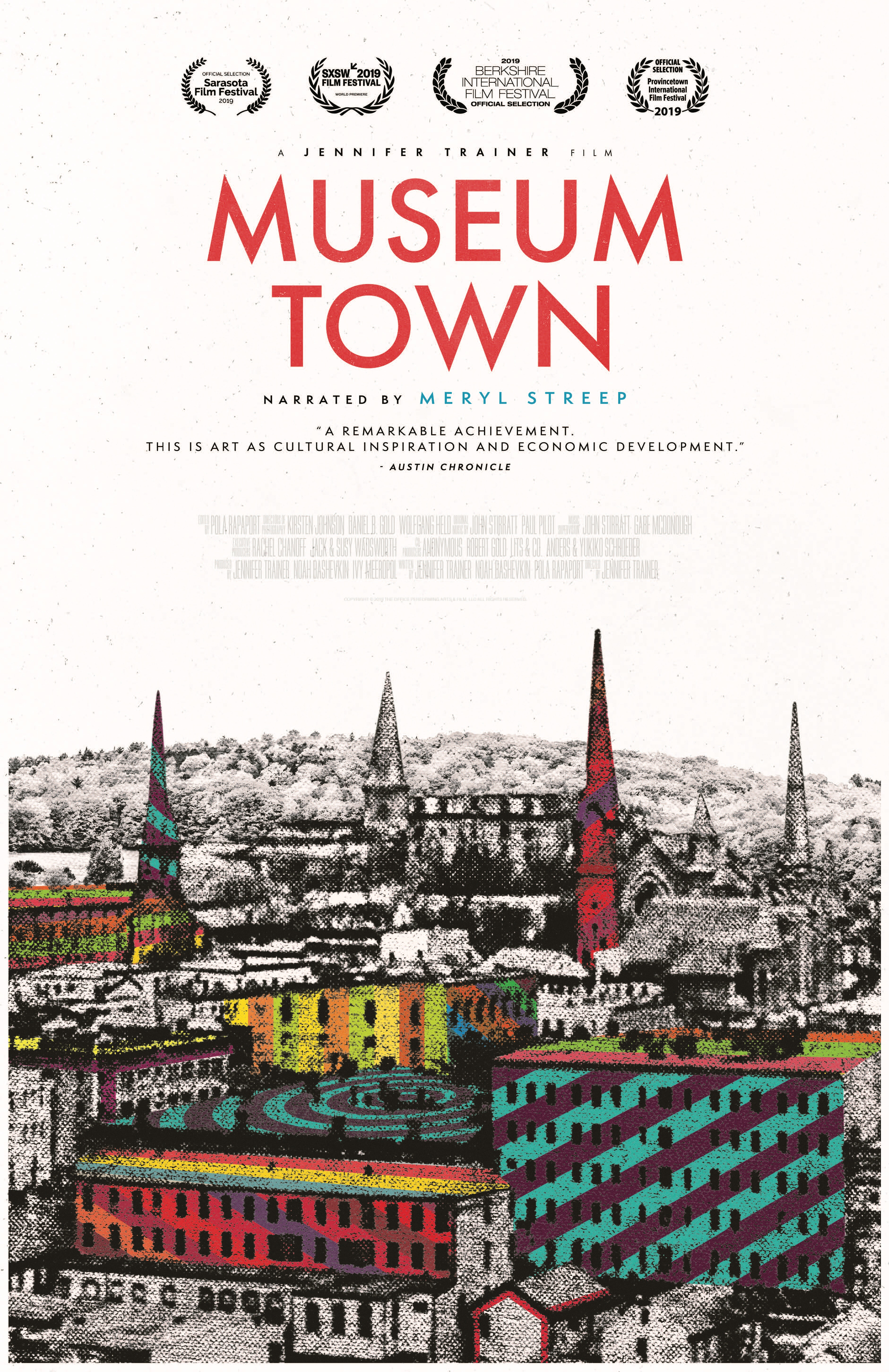
- Directed by: Jennifer Trainer
- Produced by: Jennifer Trainer; Noah Bashevkin; Ivy Meeropol
- Starring: Nick Cave; Denise Markonish; Joseph Thompson; John Barrett III; David Byrne; Thomas Krens; Ruth Yarter
- Narrated by: Meryl Streep
- Cinematography: Kirsten Johnson; Dan Gold; Wolfgang Held
- Edited by: Pola Rapaport
- Music by: John Stirratt; Paul Pilot
- Production company: THE OFFICE performing arts + film
- Distributed by: Kino Lorber
- Release date: March 10, 2019 (SXSW)
- Running time: 76 minutes
- Country: United States
- Language: English

Museum Town is a 2019 documentary film about MASS MoCA.

The film is narrated by Meryl Streep and scored by Wilco bassist John Stirratt. It had its world premiere at the 2019 South by Southwest Film Festival in the Documentary Feature Competition category.

== Premise ==
Shot over a three-year period, Museum Town profiles the history and identity of the Massachusetts Museum of Contemporary Art (MASS MoCA), one of the largest centers for contemporary visual art and performing arts in the United States. The film documents the conceptualization of American artist Nick Cave's critically acclaimed, monumental found-object installation UNTIL, which traveled from MASS MoCA to the Momentary in Bentonville, Arkansas, and Carriageworks in Sydney, Australia.
