= Paul Pilot =

- Also known as: Paul Wilkinson
- Born: Northern Ireland
- Occupations: Composer, producer, musician, engineer
- Years active: 1998–present
- Website: paulpilot.com

Paul Pilot (aka Paul Wilkinson) is a Northern Irish composer, musician and record producer.

Pilot is known for using unusual sounds and instruments alongside more traditional band arrangements. This has been variously with found sound samples or instruments such as bowed saw or bass clarinet. Pilot has worked with bands such as Duke Special, All the Luck in the World, Athlete (band), Beth Rowley, Rue Royale, and Tim Williams.

== Career ==
Paul was first active in Irish alternative band The Amazing Pilots. After the disbandment of this band in 2007, Pilot became in demand as a record producer. Notably he has worked with Northern Ireland artist Duke Special, acting as co-producer for Songs from the Deep Forest (certified gold in Ireland) and Oh Pioneer Paul also wrote songs for Beth Rowley’s top 10 UK record “Little Dreamer” and has toured as musician for artists such as John Grant and Buddy Miller. Working increasingly as a film composer Paul has worked on several award-winning features and docuseries.

== Film score composition ==
Pilot wrote the original score for Laurel Canyon: A Place in Time under director Alison Ellwood for the EPIX network. The production was nominated for 3 Emmy awards. Through newly unearthed footage and audio recordings, the series features a portrait of the artists who created a musical revolution that changed popular culture. Immersive and experiential, this event takes us back in time to a place where a rustic canyon in the heart of Los Angeles became a musical petri dish. Featuring the music of Joni Mitchell, Crosby, Stills, Nash & Young, The Doors, Linda Ronstadt, Eagles (band), and others.

Finding Oscar. The film, produced by Steven Spielberg and Frank Marshall tells the story of the search for two young boys who were plucked from a nightmare and offer the only living evidence that ties the Guatemalan government to the massacre. Along with frequent collaborator John Stirratt from the US Rock Band Wilco Paul wrote the original score. The soundtrack featured a re-recording of R.E.M classic “The Flowers of Guatemala” from their Life's Rich Pageant album. Paul collaborated with R.E.M's Peter Buck and Scott McCaughey on this new version. The soundtrack album was released by UK independent label Decor records.

Paul Pilot wrote the original score for Mr A and Mr M: The Story of A&M Records. Directed by Frank Marshall and Ryan Suffern, this two-part docuseries takes an in-depth look at A&M's artist-focused approach, and uncovers how they discovered talent while adapting to the ever-changing music industry. Featuring the music of The Police, The Carpenters, Carole King and many more.

Paul Pilot scored comedian Russell Howard’s “Until the Wheels come off” for Netflix in 2021. Featuring the UK's popular standup with candid and personal video journals as he struggled and ultimately performed during lockdown in various settings including in New Zealand.

Paul Pilot scored the Meryl Streep Narrated Museum Town again alongside Wilco’s John Stirratt. The original score along with contributions from Big Thief, David Byrne and others soundtracks the story of the Massachusetts Museum of Contemporary Art — an unconventional museum in the small town of North Adams, Mass — and the power of art to transform a barren post-industrial city. Jennifer Trainer, a former journalist and one of the original builders of Mass MoCA, directed the documentary. The film had its world premiere at this year's South by Southwest Film Festival.

Pilot wrote the score for Bidder 70, a documentary film that in 2012 won the Moving Mountains Prize at the Telluride Film Festival and was named Best American Film at the Traverse City Film Festival. He also produced and recorded the live band music for the Academy Award-nominated An Education, where he makes a cameo appearance as a band member in the club scene. His short film How To Make your own Paul Pilot Record was shown at the San Francisco International Festival of Short Films and the Chicago International Movies and Music Festival. Pilot has also worked as writer, composer, or performer on several ESPN-associated short films including Right to Play (2011), The Man vs. The Machine (2014), and What the Hell Happened to Jai Alai (2016).

== Filmography ==
Title	Year	Credits	Notes
A & Mr. M: The Story of A&M Records	2022	Composer	EPIX
Russell Howard: Until the Wheels Come Off Documentary	2021	Composer	Netflix
Jazz Fest: A New Orleans Story	2021	Composer	Sony Pictures
Laurel Canyon (documentary)	2020	Composer	EPIX
Museum Town	2019	Co-Composer (with John Stirratt)	Kino Marquee
A Final Cut for Orson	2018	Composer	Netflix
The Kids We Lose	2018	Co-Composer (with John Stirratt)	Lone Wolf Media
The Last Artisan	2018	Composer	Latent Image Productions
Satan and Adam	2018	Composer	Netflix
The Exhumation	2016	Composer	RYOT Films
Finding Oscar	2016	Co-Composer (with John Stirratt)	Kennedy Marshall executive producer Steven Spielberg
What the Hell Happened to Jai Alai	2016	Composer	ESPN
The Sculptor of Damascus	2016	Composer	RYOT Films
I Love Dick (TV series) Pilot Episode	2016	Musician	Amazon Prime
Havananimal Week	2015	Music Producer, Musician	RTÉ
Man vs Machine	2014	Co-Composer (with John Stirratt)	ESPN
Final Pose	2014	Composer	Independent
Running Blind the Movie	2013	Composer	Kennedy Marshall
Bidder 70	2012	Composer	Gage and Gage productions
Estranged	2012	Musician	Face Films
Even Gods	2011	Composer	Independent
Right to Play, 30 for 30	2011	Composer	ESPN
An Education	2009	Musician, Music Producer	BBC Films, Sony Pictures
Sesame Street, Sesame Tree	2009	Musician, Music Producer	The Jim Henson Company
