= A Fierce Pancake =

Studio album by Stump
- Released: 7 March 1988
- Recorded: 1987
- Studios: Swanyard Studios, London; Hansa Studios, Berlin
- Genres: Experimental rock; funk rock; indie rock; alternative rock; avant-garde; post-punk
- Length: 42:15
- Labels: Ensign Records; Chrysalis Records
- Producers: Holger Hiller; John Robie; Hugh Jones

Stump chronology
Quirk Out (1986)	A Fierce Pancake (1988)

Singles from A Fierce Pancake
- 1. "Chaos" Released: 12 February 1988; 2. "Charlton Heston" Released: July 1988

A Fierce Pancake is the second and final release by Anglo-Irish experimental rock band Stump. It was released 7 March 1988 on Ensign Records, and was the only full-length studio album by the band. After they had enjoyed some underground success in the 1980s, including the release of their critically acclaimed "Buffalo" single and Quirk Out mini-album in 1986, the band signed to major label Ensign Records and began work on A Fierce Pancake in 1987. A major part of the recording process was undertaken in Berlin's famous Hansa Studios, where many of the band's favourite albums by other artists had been recorded. Recording sessions were very tense and problematic. The band initially worked with Stephen Street as engineer; he departed the sessions to work on Morrissey's Viva Hate, a decision the band would regret. Electronic pioneer Holger Hiller produced the Berlin sessions, a choice taken by bassist Kev Hopper whose recent interest in sampling and similar experimental techniques that Hiller was known for had grown, much to the other band members' disdain, who felt that Hiller and Hopper's direction was not to their liking.

Hopper's personal relations with the band grew increasingly strained and he left the sessions. The band returned to London where American electronic producer John Robie produced other parts of the album. His pop-centred production ethic was at odds with Hiller's avant-garde approach, but like Hiller, his approach was not to the band's liking. Hugh Jones ultimately mixed the album at Britannia Row Studios in London. The final album mixes avant-garde, funk and rock sensibilities that mix "jagged melodies that take abrupt left turns" with its "increasingly odd songs". Joseph Neff of The Vinyl District recalled that the album's "bent was deeply non-conformist yet not substantially indebted to punk precedent. It was surely bizarre, but was also highly structured."

The album was released in March 1988 on Ensign Records, with two singles released from it; "Chaos" and "Charlton Heston". The latter reached number 72 on the UK Singles Chart, but the album was not a commercial success, despite receiving favourable reviews from critics. The band split-up later in 1988, making A Fierce Pancake their final album. It went out of print in 1990 and only briefly returned to print in 2008 as part of a compilation album entitled A Fierce Pancake & Before: The Complete Anthology. However, today the album is praised as a "cult classic". Mike Patton named the album one of his favourite albums. Critics have noted the album may have influenced later bands, and one critic called the album a "significant precursor" to post-rock.

== Background ==
Stump formed in London in 1983. Initially featuring several line-up changes, the band settled in 1985 on the line-up of former Microdisney members Mick Lynch (vocals), Rob McKahey (drums), Kev Hopper (bass) and Chris Salmon (guitar). Becoming popular in indie circles for the band's unique, experimental sound, they built a following and released the four track EP Mud on a Colon in 1986 through the Ron Johnson record label. According to The Quietus, "the four tracks suggest Stump came out of the womb fully formed; the beguiling mélange of thwarted funk, traditional Irish drum rhythms (many of McKahey's time signature are concomitant with that of Irish jigs, usually performed in 12/8 time) and Lynch's lyrics, which tended to play continual tricks with the English language, piling up Surrealist imagery with a humorous scorn for syntax." Their song "Buffalo" featured on the NME's influential cassette compilation C86, featuring 22 tracks from bands within the British indie music scene, although Stump were said to stand out from the other jangle pop bands associated with the scene due to their quirky avant-garde bent.

After their success with their C86 appearance, the band recorded the mini-album Quirk Out, which included "Buffalo", and self-released the album on 26 September 1986, and was hailed by Melody Maker as "one of the pleasures of 1986", and stayed in the UK Indie Charts for 26 weeks, peaking at number 2. The combination of the band's relentless touring and a specially filmed memorable music video for "Buffalo" for Channel 4 alternative music show The Tube prompted major record label interest in the band, and the band subsequently signed with Chrysalis Records offshoot Ensign Records. Hopper recalled that, "at first, we heard that Ensign were only interested in Mick," Hopper says, "because he was a good frontman and they saw him as the main guy in the band. I wasn't surprised at this; I can understand why that might be the case. A lot of record company people don't understand how bands work."

Although the band were associated with the C86 scene, Hopper. who was essentially Stump's "conscience" according to McKahey, had begun working with samplers. Hopper recalled "I was into the more avant-garde sample side of things. "But, at the same time, people were starting to slot in great chunks of other people's records [into their music], looping them and all that, half my friends stopped playing guitars and started programming guitars and using Ataris, including myself. Eventually, I bought an Akai S900 sampler. It was an absolute murder to program and operate and had about one second of sampling time. I was quite obsessed with sampling, I saw it as the most radical and exciting instrument of its time. The idea to pluck a sound from nature and then turn it into an instrument was a revelation." However, his fascination with sampling was met with disdain from his bandmates, with McKahey calling it "a complete fucking disaster". Despite the clashing musical ideas in the band at this time, nonetheless, they set out to record their next album, and first full album, under the spirit of their new record label. Hopper recalled "the songs had continued to evolve since Quirk Out and now with some money behind us we were ready to record our first full album and felt it was time to try a different producer."

== Recording ==
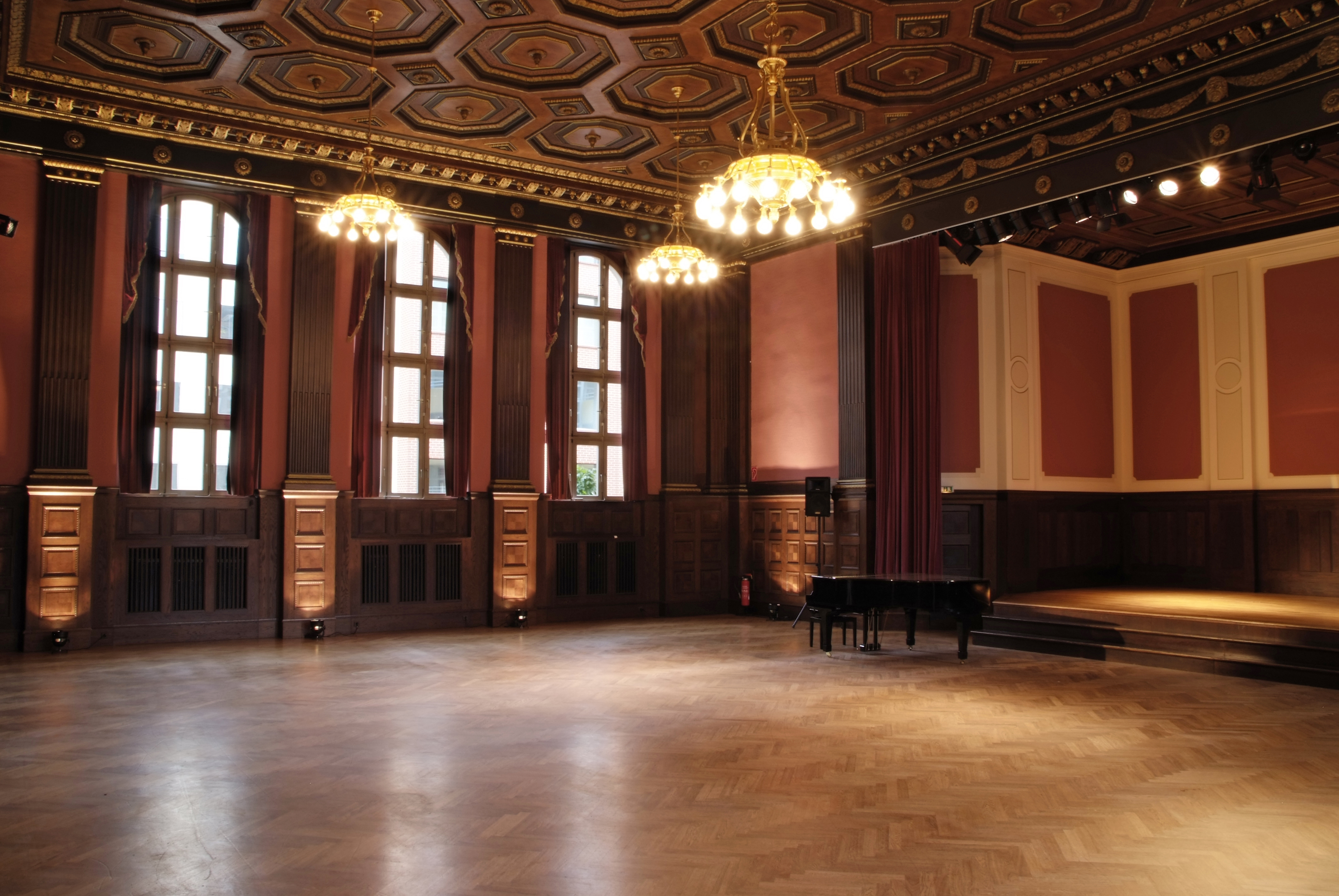
The band spent two weeks at Hansa Studios, Berlin, where they worked with engineer Stephen Street.

Recording the album in 1987, the recording sessions for the album, which spanned nine months, began at Swanyard Studios, London for a week, followed by "a place in Hoxton", before the band recorded for two weeks at the famous Hansa Studios in Berlin, Germany, only two years before the fall of the Berlin Wall. Chris Salmon said "It was an amazing place, I’m so glad we did it just before the wall came down. It had a faded grandeur; I think it was a brothel at some time." Stephen Street was the engineer for the band at Hansa, but he soon had to leave the sessions to work on Morrissey's debut album Viva Hate. The first person the band met at Hansa Studios was Nick Cave, who was recording Tender Prey. Salmon recalled "Hansa was great, I think the first person we met was Nick Cave, we had been up for 48 hours and we arrived and opened the doors and there's a very well-spoken nattily dressed gentleman. "Was that Nick Cave?" "Yeah it was, wasn’t it?" I think he had just finished Kicking Against the Pricks." McKahey recalled "Berlin in 1987, really exciting, the wall was up. It was a very Bohemian city, an incredible scene, the clubs were open all night, it had a real sense of danger. I can remember when I looked out the window of the studio I was looking directly into no-man's land at a Russian soldier on his wooden plinth."

"I deeply regret the fact that we had Stephen Street for two weeks but he wasn’t allowed to finish it. He had done The Smiths, the only band that we all agreed that we liked. What a gift of having Street, but he didn’t have authority to do it. It ended up A Fierce Pancake. What a perfect title for it, what a fucking mess basically, we could not end it. It just went on and on and on. It should have been done in a month."

— Chris Salmon reflecting on production.

The sessions at Hansa ended up being expensive and problematic because the band, especially Hopper, wanted to work with Holger Hiller, and incorporate some of Hiller's eclectic and experimental sampling techniques into their music, and ultimately the Hansa sessions "didn't work out"; Hopper recalled that he "liked the way [Hiller] deconstructed everything, it was incredible, and those records he made: Oben Im Eck and Ein Bündel Fäulnis In Der Grube, they were really amazing records, the whole notion of sampling chunks of music and then rearranging them and having all these fantastic noises that were from another genre in it. I thought that would suit the band, but I was wrong," whilst Hugh Jones recalled that "Kev had fallen out of love with playing bass and he'd gotten more involved in the sampling side of things and he really regarded this chap Holger Hiller. Kev very much pushed for the band to work with him and so off they went to Hansa and they spent a lot of time and the only person in the band who really was keen on this direction was probably Kev."

Robb later commented that "this is always the difficult part when you're in a band, working with no money for ages, then suddenly you can do anything you want, you can go to loads of studios and use loads of different people and you lose the focus, don’t you? So probably that's a problem Stump had. [...] So that's the thing, sometimes if you have too much, the focus goes. That's the thing about bands; it's so random to make a great record." There were numerous personality clashes between Heller and members of the band; Hopper recalled "It didn't quite work out, the guys in the band didn't want to be involved with him as he was saying things like 'rock & roll is dead'. I didn't mind him though as I quite like people who are cool and analytical about music." Hiller left the sessions, and McKahey commented that "Holger Hiller was a total mistake. I ended up disliking the guy intensely over his insistence on click tracks." After recording in Berlin was finished, the recordings were then sent to Quirk Out producer Hugh Jones to mix in London, where the band spent a long period whilst "things were patched up," including several re-recordings; however, as Ensign were "pretty panicked" about the relationship between the band and Hiller breaking down, and at that point the album having been unfinished, electronic producer John Robie aided to help finish the album, although the band saw his production style, which was more pop-orientated as opposed to Hiller's avant-gatrde approach, as differing negatively from the band's method.

Hopper recalled "John Robie was a big flashy, Arthur Baker-style producer; it was all beats and polished sounds. I was resistant to it, I respected him as a producer but I didn’t think he was suitable for Stump. If you listen to Stump songs they are very simple chords, they’re not sophisticated, they’re not like listening to a Cole Porter song or something like that, they are just major and minor chords usually. The interlocking drums and bass and the broken up mosaic style of the music is all about arrangement. I don’t think John Robie saw that as relevant, he just looked through all that to the melody, the rhythm, and the chords he didn’t look at the arrangement, which was what Stump's music was all about. It was an awful situation." The band thought of Steve Albini as a possible third producer to finish the album, but ultimately Jones was brought back to "clean up the mess" and finish the recordings at Britannia Row Studios in North London. Jones recalled that, by the point he rejoined the sessions, "the recording was finished; I was just there to mix it really. It happens a lot I think, once you get past that first ‘bang out stuff that you’ve done on stage for the last year’ bit which is relatively easy to do, it gets into second album syndrome, it's such a cliché." Hopper, nonetheless, stated the band were happy with the way the album turned out.

== Music ==
"Stump's music as presented on A Fierce Pancake was unashamedly large (some would even say slick) in its production design, which is a huge part of its appeal. Bassist Kev Hopper has stated how they were disinterested in limiting themselves to an "art-band" audience, and it's in this lack of meager ambition that the songs gather their initial dissonance; they sound radio ready for an infinitely more twisted universe."

— Joseph Neff talking about the album's sound.

Stewart Mason of Allmusic said that A Fierce Pancake mixes "jagged melodies that take abrupt left turns with bizarre lyrics delivered in voices ranging from silly falsettos to a grunting basso profundo" and contained "increasingly odd songs". Ron Kretsch of Dangerous Minds called the album "a supremely screwball statement-of-purpose, at turns and at once absurdist, whimsical, and dark." He commented that the album contains "some truly mind-bending and aggressively awkward Beefheartian experimentation. The guitar and bass playing here are a few leagues beyond merely idiosyncratic–indeed, there are many passages where one can’t quite tell which instrument is which," Joseph Neff of The Vinyl District recalled that the album's "bent was deeply non-conformist yet not substantially indebted to punk precedent. It was surely bizarre, but was also highly structured. And it was exceptionally smart, but the band felt more like cagey, occasionally inscrutable pranksters than savvy and sober intellectuals. Just where did this record come from? Yes, it seemed they’d chosen their name quite well." He said the album "an extremely oddball sensibility with well-conceived, surprisingly enduring music," and theorised that "what's impressive about their strategy is the discipline required to pull it off; nothing is indiscriminate in the scheme of things, and while infrequently catchy the preciseness of Stump's attack quickly lent itself to familiarity. The strictness of their avant-garde method can therefore be identified as a significant precursor to post-rock."

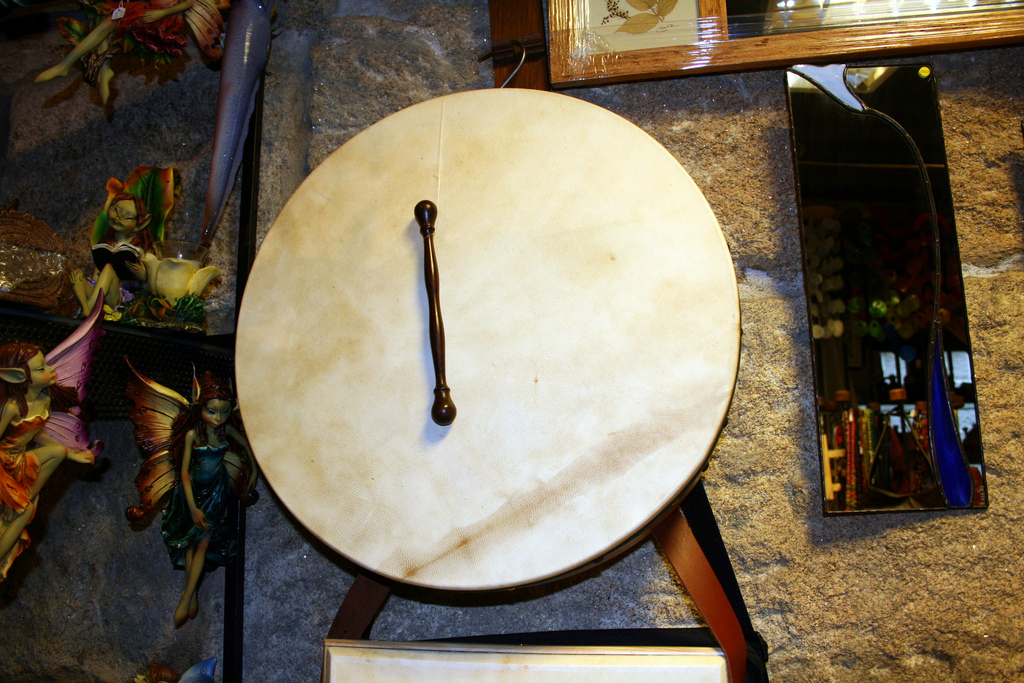
As with Quirk Out, Rob McKahey plays a bodhran on some of A Fierce Pancake.

Dangerous Minds called A Fierce Pancake "peerlessly weird Beefheartian post-punk". Moving the River said the album contained "lots of detail and a bit more sonic punch than on the debut." Hopper himself described the album as "an adventurous, arty, complex record – more atmospheric than our previous stuff. The addition of samples had worked well and it was beautifully mixed by Hugh – with a minimum of gated snares and washy reverbs. It was multi-layered and worked on several levels." Despite some of his bandmates' somewhat distaste, he commented that "there were delights a-plenty all the way through and the two dedications to Wilhelm Reich and Flann O' Brien summed up the spirit of the record. No other rock band sounded like us." Hopper's decreasing interest in the bass guitar and increasing interest in spending hours programming and sampling and "going arty and further leftfield" is sometimes said to reflect the band's direction of the time. As with Quirk Out, several songs on A Fierce Pancake feature McKahey playing the bodhran, a traditional Irish drum.

According to Neff, "from the fluttering bass, stuttering drums, and wiggling guitar" of opening song "Living it Down", "the music wobbled, swayed, bounced and stretched itself into a pop music funhouse fantasia." "Easter Bereaver" contains "circus/cartoon music" inspired by Kurt Weill, complete with "ear popping crashes and eruptions." "Chaos" contains a "strange slumping drumbeat and bent bass harmonics" with its emphatic chorus of "Mutiny!," whilst "Alcohol" is an atmospheric tale of self-delusion containing numerous samples. "Charlton Heston", which was described by Mason as a "sly Bible story recasting of Charlton Heston set to a rhythm track of croaking frogs," was intended as a joke song. The band recalled that "it was just to amuse ourselves really," with Lynch saying that the song "happened by accident; we were recording the album and we wanted to blend one song into the next, all of us were getting our own little bits to link songs. I was hung over at the Breakfast table one morning and it just came out, "Charlton Heston, put his vest on." Everyone cracked up. I wrote the first verse and that was going to be it but we wrote the rest of it and it was the fastest song we ever wrote. Maybe that's part of the appeal to it, it wasn’t laboured, it happened. Maybe that's why I like it so much. We didn’t spend eight weeks grinding it out." "Doctor (A visit to the)" features a Wilhelm Reich-style monologue of sexual dysfunction in five parts. The title track, described by Hopper as "the odd one out", is an ominous, instrumental piece complete with tremolo bass, bodhran beat, "nightmarish guitar," pipes and Schaeffer–inspired clusters of squeaking doors, dusty celestes and shopping trolleys – all objects the band found in the corners of Hansa. The album ends with the frantic energy of "Boggy Home" which contains folk-esque lyrics: "those greening, agreeable, arable acres".

== Release ==
The album was released 7 March 1988 on LP, cassette and CD by Ensign Records, an offshoot of Chrysalis Records. It was their first CD release. The band played a short national tour in promotion of the album from 5–20 March and later undertook a European tour supporting Hüsker Dü. The album title, A Fierce Pancake, means "a deep conundrum" and is taken from a line from the writer Flann O'Brien's book The Third Policeman, written from 1939–1940 but not published until 1967. Lynch felt that Flann O'Brien's writings were "almost a prerequisite for the rest of the band." The album cover was a "very conscious" continuation of the O'Brien theme, and is a photograph by Fergus Bourke that McKahey found in a Christy Moore songbook; McKahey recalled "Look let's try and offshoot this quirky image with a beautiful image of a donkey on the Aran Islands," and "everyone agreed." The album was dedicated to the life and works of O'Brien and Wilhelm Reich.

"Chaos" was released as the album's lead single on 7" and 12" formats on 12 February 1988, and was promoted with music magazine advertisements and a £70,000 music video directed by Chris Gabrin. Hopper said "I was never clear why ["Chaos"] was chosen [as the first single] as there was no discussion beforehand or formal band meeting with Ensign, but I heard from Rob, much later on, that Mick had lobbied hard as it was his favourite track." Grainge recalled "we went with ‘Chaos’ as the first single, which is nuts, probably the most nutty single, to hear that on Radio 1 a few times was pretty bizarre." "Charlton Heston" was released as the second single in July 1988, and spent five weeks in the UK Singles Chart, debuting at number 96 on 23 July and eventually reaching number 72, its highest position, on 13 August. Its music video, directed by Tim Pope, featured the band performing in front of frogs and received enough airplay on MTV "to inspire a small scramble for copies of A Fierce Pancake." The twelve-inch single of the song, entitled "Lights! Camel! Action", was a collaboration with The Irresistible Force. A single-sided twelve-inch EP containing four songs from the album was distributed to promote the album.

The album did not chart in the UK Albums Chart, and "didn't do as well" as the label had hoped, and was ultimately the band's last release on the label. Chris Salmon recalled that "to be perfectly candid, I think Ensign was the kiss of death basically. It seemed very flattering at the time, ‘a major’ and all that, but what a disaster in retrospect. We should have been picked up by a Cherry Red, or a Rough Trade or something. It was very strange signing to a major. I don’t actually know why they chose us, I don’t know what they thought they were going to get. We had a lot of momentum behind us, we had Peel behind us, and then suddenly everybody thought we’d died, and we just disappeared off the scene. From two weeks for the first album to nine months for the second one and it split the band because it went on for too long." In the United States, though not a commercial success, A Fierce Pancake received "its share of university play, particularly late at night." The album's commercial failure caused the label to re-release "Buffalo" as a single, despite the song being over two years old; it did not chart, and was the band's final release during their lifetime. A Fierce Pancake was the band's last release, and the band split-up later on in 1988 due to the numerous issues that singing to a major label had given them. The album was deleted from print in 1990, and, although not returning to print in its original form, a digitally remastered version was included as part of 2008's A Fierce Pancake & Before: The Complete Anthology compilation, itself out of print today.

== Critical reception and legacy ==
Professional ratings
Review scores
Source	Rating
AllMusic	4.5/5 stars
The Great Indie Discography (Martin C. Strong)	(8/10)
The Vinyl District	(A−)

=== Initial reception ===
The album was released to good press from music magazines, but a mixed reaction from fans, who were largely uncertain of the band's slightly more polished sound. Music writer John Robb recalled that the band "did get generally good press most of the time, I just think they never caught on with the public. I remember they did that tour after they got signed and ‘Chaos’ was getting the big push but there seemed to be fewer people going to see them then had been previously. I just don’t think people liked the direction they had taken even though it wasn’t drastically different; it was just slightly more polished. Maybe that small underground scene had its ears tuned to a rougher kind of sound. There's this big gap between the mainstream and the underground, the closest the underground got to the mainstream at that point in time was The Jesus and Mary Chain, who were a great band who wrote really great pop songs but made them sound noisy, so they managed to straddle both. Whereas Stump were just a slightly polished up version of a really off the wall band and most people just don’t get that off the wall music, do they?"

The NME positively reviewed the Irresistible Force collaboration version of "Charlton Heston" in July 1988 with a tone that suggested the band had previously been unsupporting of the band, perhaps in reflection of the C86 backlash or the increasing popularity of the likes of acid house, hence the newspaper's preference to a dance remix. Naming it an "amusing/entertaining single for the first time. All loyal Stumpies will know this like the spots on their back but to those who previously thought them appalling I can assure that Lynch and his buddies have finally managed the right balance of Nightingales/bhangra sounds and tension to create a proper little pot boiler. The partnership with the Force should be cemented immediately for although the original song has all its bones facing the right way it takes the blood and skin of the sampled funk to make it the backwater boy office buster."

Nonetheless, Martin C. Strong, in his book The Great Indie Discography, recalled the album "more than pleased hardcore fans of geeky Splodgeness/Beefheart-esque behaviour" but that "Charlton Heston" received "a cold shoulder from a music press now keen to distance themselves from anything remotely C-86; a 12-inch "Lights! Camel! Action!" version (with The Irresistible Force) was equally shunted." He said the band were being "criminally ignored." However, The Irish Times reaffirmed that the album was "highly rated by the critics". Faith No More and future Mr. Bungle singer Mike Patton, a big fan of the band, named the album as one of 1988's best in the year-end issue of Metal Maniacs and as generally "one of his favourite albums". "Charlton Heston" was ranked at number 35 in the 1988 edition of the Festive Fifty poll organised by radio DJ and Stump supporter John Peel to find out his radio listeners' favourite songs of the year.

=== Retrospective assessment ===
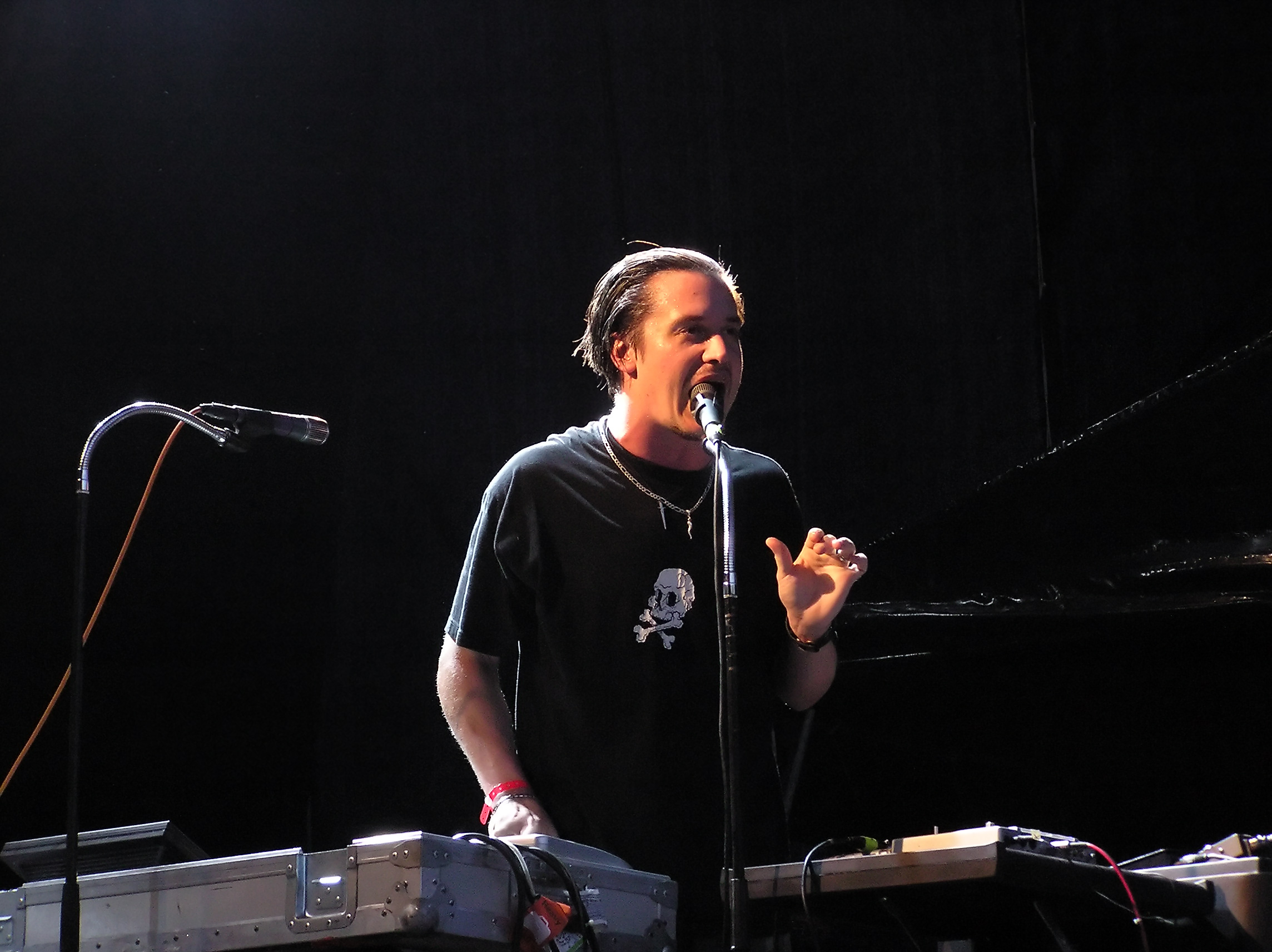
Mike Patton named the album one of his favourites.

Reviews by music critics in later times have continued to be favourable. In a retrospective review, Stewart Mason of Allmusic rated the album four and a half stars out of five, saying that "A Fierce Pancake is one of the odder records to gain a major-label release in 1988." He commented that "the production by German electronica expert Holger Hiller is antiseptically clean, which only sets off more clearly how fundamentally twisted these songs are." Joseph Neff, reviewing the album for The Vinyl District, rated the album "A−" and called it "music possessing such a warmly peculiar vision." He praised the band's unique sound, production and lyrics. Record Collector referred to A Fierce Pancake as an "unsung album." In his 2003 book The Great Indie Discography, Martin C. Strong rated the album eight out of ten. In The Rough Guide to Rock, Rhodri Marsden said the album contained "beautiful production and songwriting, with Lynch's swooping voice fronting melodic tall stories. Rarely as such a fine LP been completely ignored." A reviewer for Moving the River said the album was "beautifully produced" and was "a minor classic" which "fulfilled their potential."

Ron Kretsch of Dangerous Minds recalled that "the band initially caught [his] ear in 1988, with the preposterous single "Charlton Heston," which featured croaking frogs for a rhythm track and the facepalm-worthy refrain "Charlton Heston/Put his vest on." But when [he] heard the whole album, the mere zaniness [he] expected turned out to be a veneer for some truly mind-bending and aggressively awkward Beefheartian experimentation. The guitar and bass playing here are a few leagues beyond merely idiosyncratic–indeed, there are many passages where one can’t quite tell which instrument is which, and if U.S. Maple didn't have some Stump in their diet before they set upon their own deconstructions of rock tropes, I’ll eat my foot. The madcap persona and lyrics of singer Mick Lynch must have made it all seem like a joke to some listeners, and sure, it IS mighty fucking daffy to have the chorus of a single consist of a bug-eyed man with Tintin's hair shouting "Lights! Camel! Action!" But then you hear songs like "Living It Down" and "Heartache" and you say "whoa, damn."" In 2015, Stereo Embers Magazine called the album a "cult classic". Later bands such as Primus and U.S. Maple have been credited as using it as a possible influence. The Vinyl District considered the album to be a "significant precursor" to post-rock due to the "strictness" of the band's "avant-garde method."

Ensign Records owner Nigel Grainge commented in retrospect that "A Fierce Pancake was an ambitious record, I think it was a well recorded version of the album they would have made as an indie anyway, they just wouldn't have recorded it so expensively. I don’t think it would have been greatly different. When you listen to 'Buffalo', that's the kind of record that the band who recorded ‘Buffalo’, was going to make. 'Buffalo' was put out as the third single when all else had failed and we actually got a little bit close, we did get some airplay, but I think by that time things weren’t really gelling. We just didn’t get the momentum, it was almost like the album's dead let's give the third single a shot." In 2016, the band's drummer Rob McKahey said that "the album credits are like a who's who, and this was all for us, we could have done it all ourselves. It was ridiculous, bad management, bad decisions; I mean it cost a fortune as well. I couldn’t listen to it for years, I just thought it was a mess, I can listen to it now actually, I can see beauty in it occasionally but I’ve distanced myself from it." He told The Quietus that "A Fierce Pancake isn't bad, it's a bit dense. People were listening to it going 'what the fuck were these guys taking?' We should have regrouped, hidden away, worked on new music, waited for everything to cool down, start doing smaller gigs."

== Track listing ==
All tracks are written by Stump.

No.	Title	Length
1.	"Living It Down"	3:02
2.	"In The Green"	3:41
3.	"Roll The Bodies Over"	3:44
4.	"Bone"	3:48
5.	"Buffalo"	3:55
6.	"Chaos"	3:52
7.	"Alcohol"	4:03
8.	"Charlton Heston"	3:29
9.	"Heartache"	3:04
10.	"Doctor (A Visit To The)"	4:30
11.	"A Fierce Pancake"	3:45
12.	"Boggy Home"	2:12
Total length:		42:15

== Personnel ==
- Stump – writing, sleeve design
- Mick Lynch – vocals
- Chris Salmon – guitar
- Kev Hopper – bass guitar, sampler
- Robert McKahey – drums, bodhran
- Daryl Lee – art direction
- Mimi Izumi Kobayashi – keyboards, occasional vocals
- Allistar Thane – additional photography
- Richard Burbirdge – additional photography
- Fergus Bourke – album cover
- Holger Hiller – producer
- Hugh Jones – mixer, post-producer
- John Robie – producer
- Stephen Street – engineer

== Charts ==
=== Singles ===
Single	Chart (1988)	Peak position
"Charlton Heston"	UK Singles Chart	72
