= Telefís =

Electro-Funk duo

Telefís were a collaborative music project between Irish singer and songwriter Cathal Coughlan (Microdisney, The Fatima Mansions) and Irish producer and musician Jacknife Lee (ex-Compulsion guitarist and producer for U2, REM, Modest Mouse).

In 2022 they released two critically acclaimed albums, A hAon and a Dó, described as a "satirical, mischievous examination of Irish history and the pop culture of their lifetimes", both albums received the Electronic Sound best album of year award. A hAon peaked at No.38 on the UK album download charts in March 2022 and a Dó at No. 70 in October.

Coughlan and Lee conceived the Telefís concept and wrote and recorded the albums during the COVID-19 pandemic lockdowns, with Coughlan in Leek and Lee in Los Angeles. Their second album, a Dó, was released posthumously a few months after Coughlan's death. A third album, a Trí, was not completed or released. Lee and Coughlan had been introduced via a mutual acquaintance, Luke Haines of The Auteurs and despite completing two albums together, they never met in person. They had been due to meet on the day of Coughlan's death.

Many of the videos supporting the duo's single releases were created by Lee using vintage TV footage from the RTÉ Archives and were likened to 'seeing your childhood flash before you". The photographs of Lee and Coughlan used in the project had them assuming the roles of television news journalists from the 1960s/70s. The Telefís logo, used on the albums and merchandise, is a stylised version of the St Brigid's Cross.
