= Mick Lynch (musician) =

Irish musician (1959–2015)

Mick Lynch (11 October 1959 – 17 December 2015) was an Irish musician, best known for his work in the Irish-English band Stump.

Lynch was the son of Tadhg and Noreen Lynch and was one of five siblings. He was born in Limerick and grew up in Cork.

Stump were popular among the indie scene and the British music press in the 1980s and early 1990s. John Peel was a fan of their music. Stump was led by Lynch and influenced by Frank Zappa and Captain Beefheart and others. Lynch was especially popular for his lyrics. Stump - with Lynch as one of their main actors - released a mini-album in 1986, titled Quirk Out. Two years later, they released their only proper full-length album A Fierce Pancake. Following the band's dissolution in 1988, Lynch moved back to Cork and worked as an English and Irish language writer for the city's Dowtcha Puppets theatre.

Lynch was also in the bands Constant Reminders (with Sean O'Hagan and Cathal Coughlan) and Mean Features (with Liam Heffernan).

Lynch died on 17 December 2015 of cancer, aged 56.

== Sources ==
- McAvoy, Mark. Cork Rock: From Rory Gallagher to the Sultans of Ping. Cork: South Bank Press, 2016. ISBN 978-0-9956-1760-5
