= Fretless bass =

String instrument

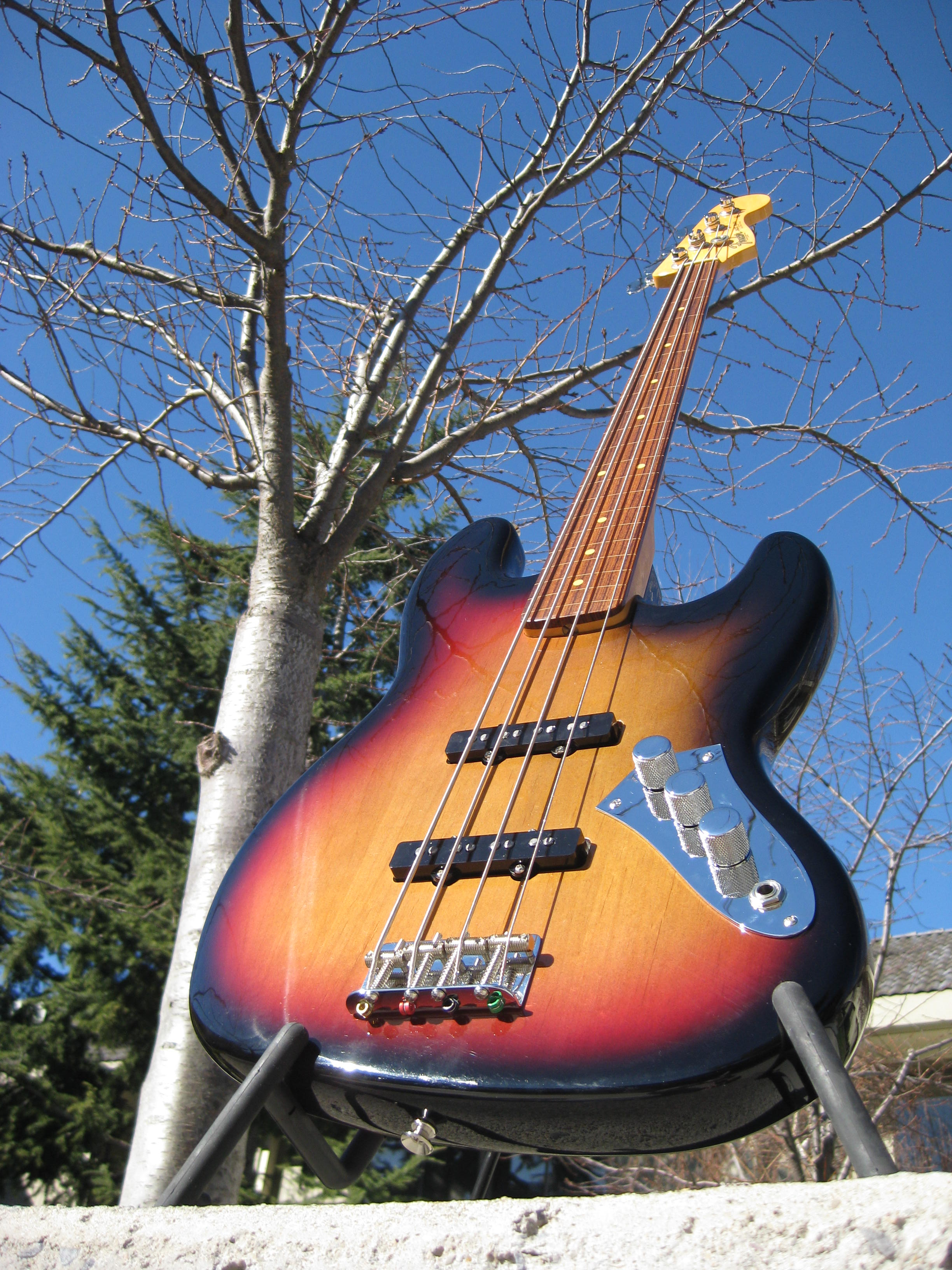
- Replica of the fretless "Bass of Doom" of Jaco Pastorius, based on a '62 Fender Jazz Bass
- Other names: Fretless bass guitar
- Classification: String instrument
- Inventors: Paul Tutmarc; Leo Fender (bass guitar)
- Developed: Early 1960s

Related instruments
- Fretless guitar; Bass guitar; Double bass; Acoustic bass guitar; Ukulele bass

A fretless bass is an electric bass guitar whose neck lacks frets and thus is smooth like traditional string instruments, and like the neck of an acoustic double bass. While the fretless bass is played in all styles of music, it is most common in pop, rock, and jazz. It first saw widespread use during the 1970s, although some players used them before then.

The Fender Precision Bass was introduced in 1951, with frets to help performers find the proper note (i.e. to provide precision). This concept of the fretted bass guitar has since become the standard, as other companies followed with similar electric fretted basses, like the Höfner 500/1 of the Beatle Paul McCartney, which resembled a viol but with frets.

The first fretless electric bass guitars appeared around 1961, from modifications made by players. Historically the most significant, while not likely the first, example of this is the Rolling Stones bassist Bill Wyman, who wanted to change the frets of his inexpensive bass guitar in 1961 to fix a buzzing sound caused by frets, but never replaced the faulty frets. The first fretless horizontal bass to be produced by a designated company, after several electrified upright basses, is the Ampeg AUB1, first released in 1965, as the unfretted version of the AEB1.

== Characteristics ==
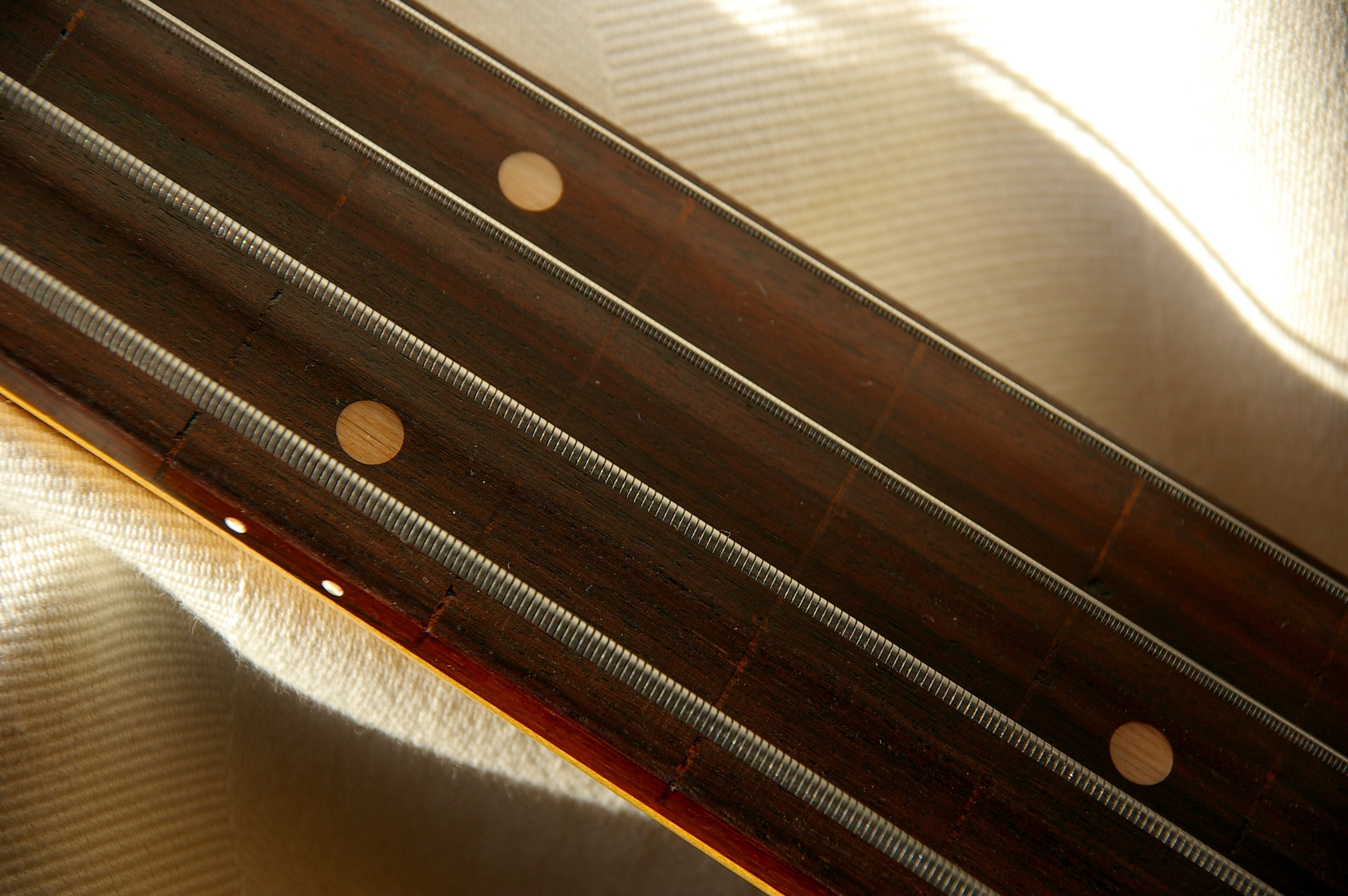
Markers laid in the side of the fingerboard aid the performer in finding the correct pitch while playing a fretless bass.

The lack of frets allows for more fluid slides between notes, but also requires greater precision by the player, as the instrument may sound out of tune if notes are not intonated accurately. Like fretted bass guitars, they can have four, five, six, or even more strings. While some have painted or inlaid "fret lines" indicating where the players should place their fingers for correct intonation, other basses may have only inlay dots or nothing at all on the fingerboard. While many fretless players use flatwound or tapewound strings as they are believed to not wear down on the neck as much as roundwounds, some players, such as Jaco Pastorius, are mainly known for using roundwound strings to gain a brighter tone. Some fretless players, Pastorius included, coat the bass fingerboard in a thin protective layer of epoxy to minimize the risk of damaging the wood when using roundwound strings.

== Notable players ==
- Jeff Ament
- Pedro Aznar
- Jack Bruce
- Boz Burrell
- Les Claypool
- Alain Caron
- Rick Danko
- John Deacon
- Steve Di Giorgio
- Mark Egan
- Tony Franklin
- Dan 'Freebo' Freidberg
- Hulk Hogan
- Kev Hopper
- John Paul Jones
- Percy Jones
- Mick Karn
- Bakithi Kumalo
- Tony Levin
- Sean Malone
- Michael Manring
- John McVie
- Patrick O'Hearn
- Pino Palladino
- Jaco Pastorius
- Tetsuo Sakurai
- Fernando Saunders
- Stanley Sheldon
- Sting
- Dave Sturt
- Jeroen Paul Thesseling
- Jah Wobble
- Bill Wyman
