= Crooked Mile =

Crooked Mile or A Crooked Mile or The Crooked Mile may refer to:

== Nursery rhyme ==
- "There Was a Crooked Man who walked a crooked mile"

== Arts and entertainment ==
- The Crooked Mile (musical), a 1959 musical and soundtrack
- The Crooked Mile, a children's film written and directed by Stephen Kane and Joe McKinney
- A Crooked Mile, episode 3 of The Wolf Among Us
- The Crooked Mile, a series of 1989 comics by Philip Bond
- The Crooked Mile, a 1924 novel by Bernard DeVoto
- Crooked Mile (album), a 1987 album by Microdisney
- "Crooked Mile", a song by Baroness from the 2019 album Gold & Grey

== Other ==
- The nickname for a section on the B194 road passing through Fishers Green north of Waltham Abbey, Essex, England
