= Nite Flights =

Nite Flights may refer to:

- "Nite Flights" (song), a song by the Walker Brothers
- Nite Flights (album), a 1978 album by the Walker Brothers
