= Viva Dead Ponies =

Studio album by the Fatima Mansions
- Released: 1990
- Genre: Alternative rock
- Length: 44:25
- Label: Kitchenware
- Producer: Cathal Coughlan, Tíma Mansió (Brasil), Ralph Jezzard

The Fatima Mansions chronology
Against Nature (1989)	Viva Dead Ponies (1990)	Bertie's Brochures (1991)

Professional ratings
Review scores
Source	Rating
AllMusic	4.0/5 stars

Viva Dead Ponies is the second album by the Fatima Mansions, and features elements of both their original, more synth-led and melodic sound on songs such as "You're a Rose", as well as the noisier, guitar-oriented style that would become more prominent in their later works (a notable example of this being "Look What I Stole for Us, Darling").

As with their later album Lost in the Former West, the American release of Viva Dead Ponies featured a different track list, removing the poppy "Thursday" and adding "Only Losers Take the Bus" and "Blues for Ceausescu". In 2007, Kitchenware and Sony BMG Music Entertainment reissued it as a 2-CD set, with a remastered version of the album on CD 1 and a career-spanning compilation on CD 2.

== Track listing ==
All songs written by Cathal Coughlan, unless otherwise indicated.

Original release (Kitchenware--KWCD 15 (CD), KWLP 15 (LP, UK); Radioactive/Kitchenware--RARD 10242 (CD), RAR 10242 (LP, UK), KWLCD 19262 (CD), Radioactive--KWLMC 19262 (cassette, Europe))
No.	Title	Length
1.	"Angel's Delight"	4:32
2.	"Concrete Block"	0:16
3.	"Mr. Baby"	2:53
4.	"The Door-to-Door Inspector"	4:13
5.	"Start the Week"	0:25
6.	"You're a Rose"	3:31
7.	"Legoland 3"	0:27
8.	"Thursday"	3:38
9.	"Ceausescu Flashback"	0:13
10.	"Broken Radio No. 1"	4:38
11.	"Concrete Block"	0:27
12.	"Look What I Stole for Us, Darling (Intro)"	0:59
13.	"Look What I Stole for Us, Darling"	3:05
14.	"Farewell Oratorio / The White Knuckle Express"	4:15
15.	"Chemical Cosh"	1:42
16.	"Tima Mansió Speaks"	0:17
17.	"A Pack of Lies"	2:52
18.	"Viva Dead Ponies"	5:13
19.	"More Smack, Vicar"	0:52

Correct track list (affecting tracks 12–14) given above. For the LP releases, Side 1 was tracks 1–11, while Side 2 was 12–19.

1991 reissue (Radioactive--RARD 10242 (CD), RAR-10242 (LP), RARC-10242 (cassette, U.S.); MCA/Radioactive--MCD 10254/RARD 10254 (CD, Germany); MCA/Radioactive – MVCM-105/RARD 10242 (CD, Japan))
No.	Title	Length
1.	"Angel's Delight"	4:32
2.	"Concrete Block"	0:16
3.	"Blues for Ceausescu"	6:17
4.	"Legoland 3"	0:27
5.	"Mr. Baby"	2:53
6.	"The Door-to-Door Inspector"	4:13
7.	"Start the Week"	0:25
8.	"You're a Rose"	3:31
9.	"Ceausescu Flashback"	0:13
10.	"Broken Radio No. 1"	4:38
11.	"Concrete Block"	0:27
12.	"Only Losers Take the Bus"	3:06
13.	"Look What I Stole for Us, Darling (Intro)"	0:59
14.	"Look What I Stole for Us, Darling"	3:05
15.	"Farewell Oratorio / The White Knuckle Express"	4:15
16.	"Chemical Cosh"	1:42
17.	"Tima Mansió Speaks"	0:17
18.	"A Pack of Lies"	2:52
19.	"Viva Dead Ponies"	5:13
20.	"More Smack, Vicar"	0:52

Correct track list (affecting tracks 13–15) given above. For the LP and cassette releases, Side 1 was tracks 1–11, while Side 2 was 12–20. 14 crops "I'm" from the opening lyric "I'm attacking the ones who are weakest of all." 16 is the re-recorded version from the "Hive" EP.
2007 reissue (Kitchenware/Sony BMG Music Entertainment—88697145932 (2CD, UK))

CD 1 (album)
No.	Title	Length
1.	"Angel's Delight"	4:35
2.	"Concrete Block"	0:16
3.	"Mr. Baby"	2:55
4.	"The Door-to-Door Inspector"	4:13
5.	"Start the Week"	0:25
6.	"You're a Rose"	3:31
7.	"Legoland 3"	0:27
8.	"Thursday"	3:40
9.	"Ceausescu Flashback"	0:14
10.	"Broken Radio No. 1"	4:41
11.	"Concrete Block"	0:28
12.	"Look What I Stole for Us, Darling"	4:06
13.	"The White Knuckle Express"	4:18
14.	"Chemical Cosh"	1:41
15.	"Tima Mansió Speaks"	0:17
16.	"A Pack of Lies"	2:53
17.	"Viva Dead Ponies"	5:14
18.	"More Smack, Vicar"	0:55

12 combines the two separate tracks at last, crops all the silence between the two parts, and starts the second part with "I'm attacking...". "Farewell Oratorio" is uncredited, but it is still the intro of 13. 14 is the re-recorded version from the "Hive" EP.

CD 2 (compilation)
No.	Title	Writer(s)	Original release	Length
1.	"Only Losers Take the Bus"		Against Nature, 1989	3:10
2.	"The Loyaliser"		Lost in the Former West, 1994	3:17
3.	"Evil Man"		Valhalla Avenue, 1992	4:14
4.	"North Atlantic Wind"		Valhalla Avenue	4:23
5.	"Bertie's Brochures"		Bertie's Brochures, 1991	4:19
6.	"1000%"		Valhalla Avenue	4:03
7.	"Valhalla Avenue"		Valhalla Avenue	3:22
8.	"Behind the Moon"		Bertie's Brochures	3:49
9.	"Popemobile to Paraguay"		Lost in the Former West	4:40
10.	"You Won't Get Me Home"		Against Nature	3:04
11.	"Belong Nowhere"		Lost in the Former West	4:53
12.	"Nite Flights"	Scott Engel	Lost in the Former West	3:52
13.	"Wilderness on Time"		Against Nature	3:16
14.	"Humiliate Me"		Lost in the Former West	3:42
15.	"Blues for Ceausescu (6:17)/silence (0:16)/Into Thinner Air with the Loyaliser (Juno Reactor Mix) (7:25)"		"Blues for Ceausescu" (1990) and "The Loyaliser" (1994) 12"/CD singles	13:58

5 edits out the spoken word introduction. "Into Thinner Air" is a hidden bonus track.

== Personnel ==
- Cathal Coughlan – vocals, keyboards, programming
- Andrías Ó Grúama – guitar
- Nick Bunker – keyboards
- Hugh Bunker – bass guitar
- Nicholas Tiompan Allum – drums, wind

with:

- Kenny Davis - accordion
- Alison Jiear - additional vocals
- Lawrence Bogle - cover illustration
