= The Peel Sessions Album (Microdisney album) =

Compilation album by Microdisney
- Released: 1989
- Recorded: 1983–1986
- Studio: Maida Vale, studios 4 and 5
- Length: 45:33 (vinyl)
- Label: Strange Fruit
- Producer: Barry Andrews; Dale Griffin; Mark Radcliffe; Phil Ward-Large

Microdisney chronology
39 Minutes (1988)	The Peel Sessions Album (1989)

The Peel Sessions Album is a compilation of tracks recorded by the Irish pop group Microdisney for the Peel Sessions on radio DJ John Peel's BBC Radio 1 show. Peel championed the band describing them as "an iron fist in a velvet glove", and Microdisney recorded six sessions for his show, amounting to 24 songs, gathered from their first three studio albums and earlier self released tracks.

The vinyl LP edition collected 12 songs from these sessions, the CD versions and later compact cassette reissues added two additional tracks.

== Track listing ==
All tracks composed by Cathal Coughlan and Sean O'Hagan.

Side one

1. "Sun" (2:40)
2. "Moon" (2:12)
3. "Everybody Is Dead" (3:10)
4. "A Friend with a Big Mouth" (3:50)
5. "Teddy Dogs" (2:48)
6. "Before Famine" (3:10)
7. "464" (5:32)

Side two

1. "Loftholdingswood" (5:10)
2. "Horse Overboard" (4:06)
3. "Town to Town" (3:37)
4. "Bullwhip Road" (3:36)
5. "Begging Bowl" (5:42)

The CD version and later cassette reissues added the tracks "Dreaming Drains" (2:35) and "Genius" (4:01).
