= Stump (band) =

Irish-English music group

- Origin: London, England
- Genres: Post-punk, alternative rock, experimental rock
- Years active: 1983–1988
- Labels: Ron Johnson Records, Ensign
- Spinoffs: Shrubs
- Past members: Mick Lynch; Rob McKahey; Kev Hopper; Chris Salmon; Nick Hobbs

Stump were an Irish-English indie/experimental/rock group consisting of Mick Lynch (vocals), Rob McKahey (drums), Kev Hopper (bass) and Chris Salmon (guitar). Their music has been described as a mixture of Captain Beefheart and The Fall, and they are best known for their influential, critically acclaimed, but poor selling 1988 album, A Fierce Pancake.

== Early years ==
Their first release was a four track EP Mud on a Colon issued in 1986 through the Ron Johnson record label. This was followed by a self released mini album, Quirk Out, produced by Hugh Jones, which included their cult hit "Buffalo". "Buffalo" appeared on NME's influential C86 compilation, and a video was made by Channel 4 which was shown on The Tube. Continuous UK touring, regular coverage in the UK music press - including cover features in both the NME and Melody Maker, and a return to The Tube for a live performance of "Tupperware Stripper", ensured that Quirk Out stayed in the UK Indie Charts for 26 weeks, peaking at number 2.

A session for the John Peel radio show recorded in February 1986 was released as a Peel Session EP on Strange Fruit Records the following year. Following these successes the band were signed to Ensign Records.

== A Fierce Pancake ==
Their only album, A Fierce Pancake, (named after a term meaning 'deep conundrum' in The Third Policeman by Flann O'Brien) released in 1988 was recorded in Berlin and London produced by Holger Hiller with assistance from Stephen Street and was mixed by Hugh Jones after an unsuccessful session with US producer John Robie. The recording process was often fraught with arguments amongst the band as to the sound and direction of the album. However, the group were pleased with the finished results and three singles were released from the album: "Chaos", "Charlton Heston" (which reached number 72 in the UK Singles Chart in August 1988 and therefore became their only national chart success) and a re-released "Buffalo" (the latter only featuring on the US edition of the album). The album did not bring the crossover success the label had hoped for and, after recording a few b-sides and some demos, they split up at the end of the year.

== Legacy ==
Stump's persistent and growing cult following prompted the release of A Fierce Pancake on iTunes; Hopper had previously reported on his website that their entire catalogue had been out of print since 1990. The "Pancake" download prompted the release of a 3-CD set containing Mud on a Colon, Quirk Out and A Fierce Pancake, as well as the group's post-"Pancake" b-sides and demos and their compilation appearance, "Big End". This was released by Sanctuary Records in 2008 under the title The Complete Anthology.

Mick Lynch died in December 2015.

== Discography ==
=== Albums ===
- Quirk Out (1986), Stuff (UK Indie No. 2) - mini-LP
- A Fierce Pancake (1988), Ensign

=== Singles and EPs ===
- Mud on a Colon EP (1986), Ron Johnson (UK Indie #39)
- The Peel Sessions EP (1987), Strange Fruit (UK Indie #13)
- "Chaos" (1988), Ensign
- "Charlton Heston", (1988), Ensign (UK #72)
- "Buffalo" (1988), Ensign

=== Compilation albums ===
- The Complete Anthology box set (2008), Sanctuary
- Does the Fish Have Chips? (2014), Cherry Red Records

== Members ==
- Mick Lynch - Vocals
- Kev Hopper - Bass
- Chris Salmon - Guitar
- Rob McKahey - Drums
