= Come Back My Children =

Compilation album by Fatima Mansions
- Released: 1992
- Genre: Alternative rock
- Length: 55 minutes
- Label: Kitchenware Records

Fatima Mansions chronology
Valhalla Avenue (1992)	Come Back My Children (1992)	Lost in the Former West (1995)

Come Back My Children is a compilation album by Fatima Mansions consisting of all eight tracks from Against Nature, along with other early singles and B-sides and covers of "Stigmata" by Ministry and "Lady Godiva's Operation" by The Velvet Underground. Its title is derived from a lyric in "On Suicide Bridge".

== Track listing ==
All songs written by Cathal Coughlan, except for when noted.

1. "Only Losers Take The Bus" (3:08)
2. "The Day I Lost Everything" (4:16)
3. "Wilderness On Time" (3:15)
4. "You Won't Get Me Home" (3:01)
5. "13th Century Boy" (4:00)
6. "Bishop of Babel" (2:53)
7. "Valley of the Dead Cars" (3:19)
8. "Big Madness/Monday Club Carol" (4:38)
9. "What" (3:05)
10. "Blues for Ceaucescu" (6:17)
11. "On Suicide Bridge" (3:27)
12. "Hive" (3:01)
13. "The Holy Mugger" (2:40)
14. "Stigmata" (Ministry) (3:09)
15. "Lady Godiva's Operation" (Lou Reed) (4:55)

== Personnel ==
- Cathal Coughlan – vocals, keyboards, programming
- Andrías Ó Gruama – guitar
- Zac Woolhouse – keyboards
- John Fell – bass guitar
- Nicholas Tiompan Allum – drums, wind
