= Philip Kane =

English soul and art-rock singer

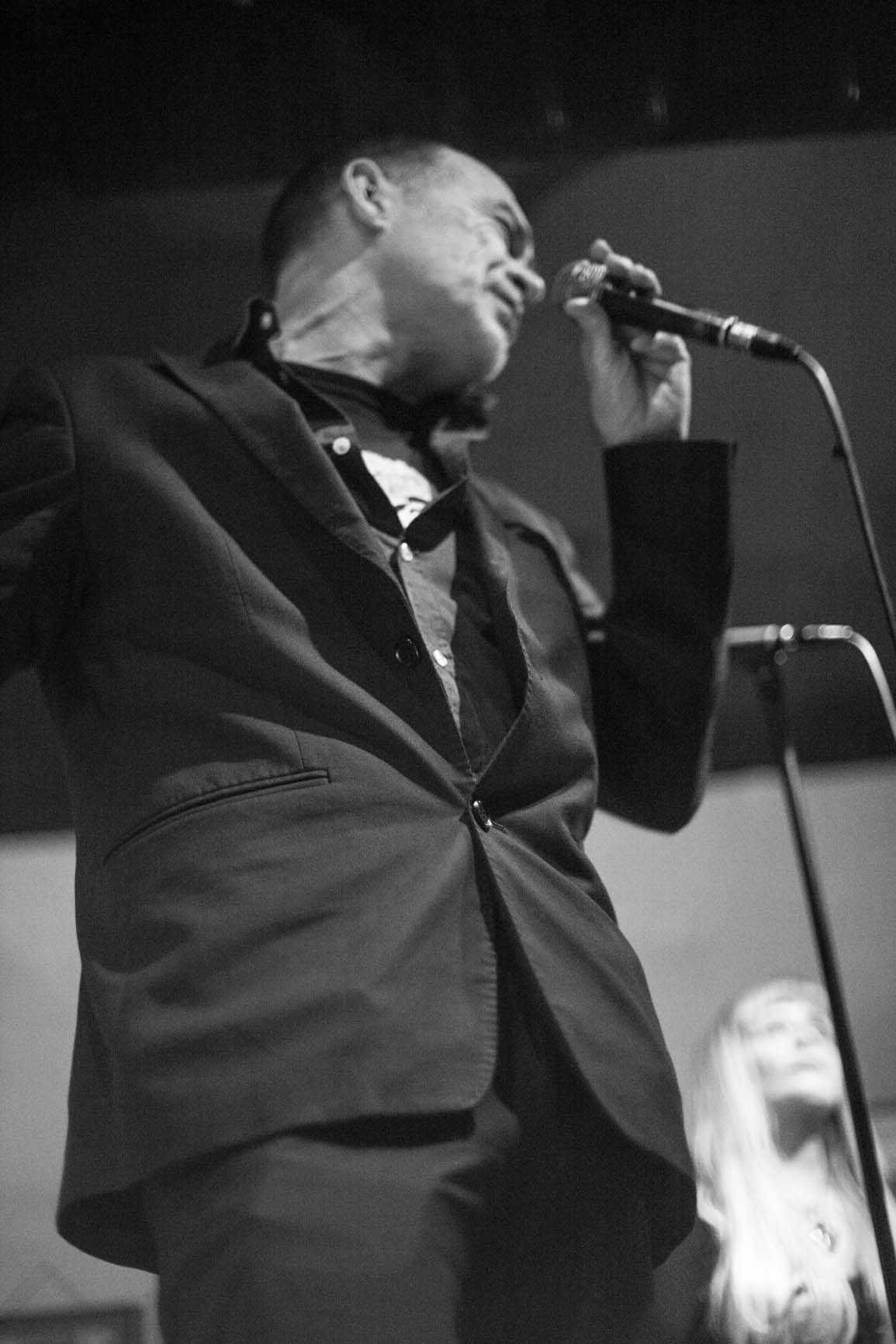
Philip Kane

Philip Kane is a London soul and art-rock singer who has released four albums. Cathal Coughlan produced his earlier work as Avalanche and Mark Eitzel contributed backing vocals to Flowers & Ledges, which was listed as one of the tracks of 2016 by The Quietus.

One of his songs was aired on RTL in France and he received a favorable review from a Norwegian web site and also Norwegian national newspaper Dagbladet and Uncut magazine. In December 2016 he played the Elgar Room at the Royal Albert Hall as part of their Late Night Jazz season.

== Discography ==
=== Albums ===
- Songs for Swinging Lovers (2002), Corrupt
- Time: Gentlemen (2004), Corrupt
- Flowers & Ledges (2016), Corrupt
- Book of Broken Things (2021), Corrupt

=== Singles ===
- "Media Gurls" (2001), Corrupt
- "Me, The Ladyboy And Gloria Estefan" (2003), Corrupt
- "Hurricane of Maggots" (2020), Corrupt
- "Radio Friendly Death" (2020), Corrupt
