= Against Nature =

Against Nature may refer to:

- Against Nature (album) (1989), a rock album by The Fatima Mansions
- Against Nature, a 2015 album by Marc Almond
- Against Nature?, a museum exhibition on homosexuality in animals
- Against Nature (band), a doom metal band from Baltimore, MD
- Against Nature (Obverse Books), a science fiction novel by Lawrence Burton
- Against Nature (documentary), a television documentary by Martin Durkin
- À rebours, a 1883 French novel by Joris-Karl Huysmans

== See also ==
- Crime against nature
