= Everybody Is Fantastic =

Everybody is Fantastic

Studio album by Microdisney
- Released: 25 May 1984
- Genre: Indie pop
- Length: 41:35 (vinyl)
- Label: Rough Trade
- Producer: John Porter; Ben Rogan; Steve Parker; Microdisney

Microdisney chronology
Kaught at the Kampus (1981)	Everybody is Fantastic (1984)	We Hate You South African Bastards! (1985)

Singles from Everybody is Fantastic
- 1. "Dolly" / "This Liberal Love" Released: June 1984

Everybody Is Fantastic is the debut album by Irish indie band Microdisney. The album was recorded by singer Cathal Coughlan and guitarist Sean O'Hagan, after they had relocated from Ireland to London. It was released in 1984, and was largely performed by Coughlan and O'Hagan with contributions from future Microdisney members John Fell and Tom Fenner, and session musicians John McKenzie and Terry Stannard.

In a review at the time or the album's release, Nick Kelly of Hot Press wrote of Everybody is Fantastic, "In case you haven't yet got the message, I think that Everybody Is Fantastic – is fantastic!". The same magazine would later place the album at 36 on its list of Greatest Irish Albums.

== Track listing ==
All tracks composed by Cathal Coughlan and Sean O'Hagan.

Side one

1. "Idea" (2:52)
2. "A Few Kisses" (3:15)
3. "Escalator in the Rain" (3:32)
4. "Dolly" (3:18)
5. "Dreaming Drains" (2:45)
6. "I'll Be a Gentleman" (3:30)
7. "Moon" (3:30)

Side two

1. "Sun" (3:12)
2. "Sleepless" (2:32)
3. "Come On Over and Cry" (3:00)
4. "This Liberal Love" (3:12)
5. "Before Famine" (3:42)
6. "Everybody Is Dead" (3:10)

== Reissues ==
The 1996 CD release and subsequent reissues featured the bonus track "Dear Rosemary" (2:31).

In 2013 the album was reissued on Cherry Red Records with the following songs added as bonus tracks.

1. "Dear Rosemary" (2:30)
2. "Sleepless" (Peel Sessions) (2:06)
3. "Moon" (Peel Sessions) (2:15)
4. "Sun" (Peel Sessions) (2:43)
5. "Before Famine" (Peel Sessions) (3:17)
