= The Clock Comes Down the Stairs =

Studio album by Microdisney
- Released: 1985
- Recorded: 1985
- Genre: Indie pop
- Length: 41:35 (vinyl)
- Label: Rough Trade
- Producer: Jamie Lane

Microdisney chronology
We Hate You South African Bastards! (1984)	The Clock Comes Down the Stairs (1985)	Crooked Mile (1987)

Singles from The Clock Comes Down the Stairs
- 1. "Birthday Girl" / "Harmony Time" Released: September 1985

The Clock Comes Down the Stairs is the second studio album by the Irish band Microdisney. It was recorded and released in 1985, and was their last album for Rough Trade Records before signing to Virgin Records the following year. The album was mainly recorded in the flat of producer Jamie Lane, with additional recording, including the drums tracks, completed at a professional studio in Shoreditch.

The album reached number one on the UK Indie Chart. The New Musical Express would later place it 49th in its list of the best albums of 1985, with the lead single from the album, "Birthday Girl", also placed in the top 50 of the best tracks of the year.

In 2018 the album was awarded the inaugural "IMRO | NCH Trailblazer Award", a new music award presented by the Irish Music Rights Organisation and National Concert Hall "celebrating seminal albums by iconic Irish musicians, songwriters and composers."

In 2024 the album gave its name to the documentary film The Story of Microdisney: The Clock Comes Down the Stairs, broadcast on BBC Four on Friday 15 March 2024, which told the story of band's formation, career and reformation.

== Track listing ==
All tracks composed by Cathal Coughlan and Sean O'Hagan

Side one

1. "Horse Overboard" (3:53)
2. "Birthday Girl" (4:08)
3. "Past" (4:29)
4. "Humane" (3:07)
5. "Are You Happy?" (5:24)

Side two

1. "Genius" (4:20)
2. "Begging Bowl" (5:36)
3. "A Friend With A Big Mouth" (3:25)
4. "Goodbye It's 1987" (4:12)
5. "And" (4:21)

== Reissue ==
In 2013 the album was reissued on Cherry Red Records with the following songs added as bonus tracks.

1. "Harmony Time" (B-side) – 5:04
2. "Money for Trams (B-side) – 6:52
3. "Genius (Peel Sessions) – 4:06
4. "464" (Peel Sessions) – 5:38
5. "Goodbye It's 1987" (Peel Sessions) – 4:08
6. "Horse Overboard" (Peel Sessions) – 4:21
