= We Hate You South African Bastards! =

Compilation album by Microdisney
- Released: 1984
- Genre: Post-punk
- Length: 40:40 (CD reissue)
- Label: Rough Trade
- Producer: Dave Freely; Terry Cromer on "Pink Skinned Man"

Microdisney chronology
Everybody Is Fantastic (1984)	We Hate You South African Bastards! (1984)	The Clock Comes Down the Stairs (1985)

We Hate You South African Bastards! is a compilation album by the Irish band Microdisney. It was re-issued on CD with the title Love Your Enemies to reflect post-Apartheid South Africa. The album consists of early recordings of Microdisney before they moved from Cork to London.

The cover art was designed by the Welsh musician and artist Jon Langford, a founding member of the Mekons and the Three Johns.

== Track listing ==
All tracks composed by Cathal Coughlan and Sean O'Hagan

1. "Helicopter of the Holy Ghost" (3:53)
2. "Michael Murphy" (2:08)
3. "Love Your Enemies" (3:12)
4. "Fiction Land" (2:28)
5. "Pink Skinned Man" (4:08)
6. "Patrick Moore Says You Can't Sleep Here" (2:23)
7. "Hello Rascals" (2:46)
8. "Pretoria Quickstep" (4:50)
9. "Loftholdingswood" (5:30)
10. "Teddy Dogs" (3:28)
11. "464" (5:58)

9–11 are CD bonus tracks, taken from the 12" EP In the World, released in 1985 by Rough Trade.

== Sources ==
- Young, Rob. Rough Trade. Black Dog Publishing, ISBN 1-904772-47-1
