= Quirk Out =

Studio album by Stump
- Released: 26 October 1986
- Recorded: July 1986
- Studio: Rockfield Studios, Monmouthshire
- Genre: Experimental rock; funk rock; indie rock; alternative rock; avant-garde; post-punk
- Length: 19:24
- Label: Stuff Records
- Producer: Hugh Jones

Stump chronology
Quirk Out (1986)	A Fierce Pancake (1988)

Singles from Quirk Out
- 1. "Buffalo" Released: Late 1988

Quirk Out is the debut mini album by Anglo-Irish experimental rock band Stump. After building up a following with their unique sound and live performances, Stump recorded Quirk Out as their second release with producer Hugh Jones at Rockfield Studios in July 1986, following the release of the Mud on a Colon EP earlier in the year. The band's aim for Quirk Out was to capture the band's energy as a live band on studio recordings. The record blends genres such as avant-garde, funk rock with indie rock sensibilities. The best known song from the album, "Buffalo", had already been released on the NME compilation C86, an influential cassette compilation containing newly recorded music from different bands of the British independent music scene.

The band released Quirk Out on their own label Stuff Records in September 1986. It was an unprecedented success for an indie album, reaching number 2 on the UK Independent Albums Chart and spending 26 weeks on the chart. In its 20th week it became the longest-charting album in the history of the chart. It sold approximately 50,000 copies. The album was also a great critical success. Melody Maker named it "one of the pleasures of 1986," whilst Sounds and the NME both included the album in their lists of the 50 greatest albums of the year. Record Collector said the album remains "Stump's most satisfying listen." The band toured the album in 1987 and made several memorable appearances on Channel 4 music show The Tube in promotion. "Buffalo" was belatedly released as a single in 1988. Although Quirk Out has not been re-released, all its songs has been remastered and reissued, most recently on the compilation Does the Fish Have Chips?: Early and Late Works 1986–1989 (2015).

== Background ==
Stump formed in London in 1983 after Irish drummer Rob McKahey left Microdisney and answered an advertisement for a singer and drummer by English musicians Kev Hopper (bass) and Chris Salmon (guitarist), who had met during the summer holidays of 1982 in Whitstable as Hopper completed his studies at the Canterbury College of Art. McKahey met with Hopper and Salmon in Peckham. McKahey recalled that at the time, the duo already had s singer, Nick Hobbs, who went on to be singer in the Shrubs, "but in those days, I was a bit of a dickhead really. I was very assertive, very pushy and I got rid of Nick because I thought that was a gaping hole in the whole thing. And Kev and Chris were very middle-class, very quiet… but then they were coming up with this music, it was so interesting, such a challenge. We tried to get a singer for ages until eventually I persuaded [Mick Lynch, his former bandmate and vocalist in Microdisney], whom I'd seen playing in Cork, and he came down. He heard the music, went 'this is great' and we were off!"

"Stump were a great live band. Their music was much more lithe and rhythmically beguiling than most of the shambling bands. it felt more loose and inventive rhythmically. And then mainly he was such a charismatic, exuberant, watchable frontman which set them apart from nearly everybody in that scene. They were out to entertain. There was a great sense of humour and delight transmitted by Stump."

— Simon Reynolds.

Becoming popular in indie circles for the band's unique, experimental sound, they built a following and released the four track EP Mud on a Colon in 1986 through the Ron Johnson record label. According to The Quietus, "the four tracks suggest Stump came out of the womb fully formed; the beguiling mélange of thwarted funk, traditional Irish drum rhythms (many of McKahey's time signature are concomitant with that of Irish jigs, usually performed in 12/8 time) and Lynch's lyrics, which tended to play continual tricks with the English language, piling up Surrealist imagery with a humorous scorn for syntax." Their newly recorded song "Buffalo" featured on the NME's influential cassette compilation C86, featuring 22 tracks from underground bands within the British indie music scene, although Stump were said to stand out from the other jangle pop bands associated with the scene due to their quirky avant-garde bent. After the success of these releases, and the band's live shows in which "the band were even more striking, with Lynch's gangly, topless, rubber-bodied figure skittering across the stage in what amounted to a physical approximation of the warped music going on beside him." The band were unsatisfied with the production of the Mud on a Colon EP, and wanted to record another release with stronger production that reflected the band's live sound. Thus, the band began work on Quirk Out in 1986.

== Recording ==
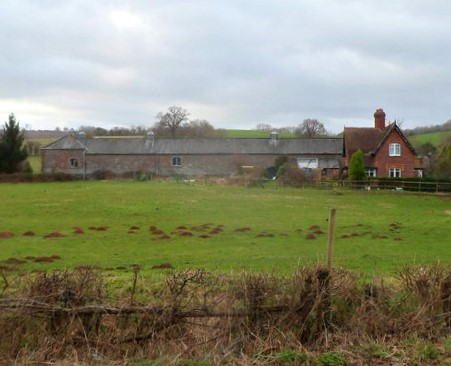
Quirk Out was recorded at Rockfield Studios in Monmouthshire.

The band recorded Quirk Out at Rockfield Studios, Monmouthshire with prolific post-punk producer Hugh Jones in July 1986. Lynch recalled that Jones had been asked to look at a band called the Wolfhounds that Stump were supporting, but Jones said to his manager that he wanted to produce Stump. As a result, Jones' manager took the band on and signed them a management deal. The band then "went away" and recorded demos, and Jones began "touting it around" to record companies, but other labels were not interested, so Jones decided to "throw the money in" himself. The album was recorded on Jones' budget of £10,000. Jones recalled that he "really loved [Stump]; they just didn’t sound like anything else so we financed Quirk Out and we went down to Rockfield Studios and recorded it down there. We weren’t really expecting hit singles or anything like that. You have to remember that Quirk Out was done very, very cheaply and we were using Rockfield which was sort of like my home base at that time. So at that point there were no major record companies in sight or anything like that it was something that we did independently." Nonetheless, the album's production was seen by some as unusual, as the booklet write-up for the Glastonbury Festival of 1987 said the production on the album was "expensive by independent standards."

"So that was Quirk Out, it was done very quickly, it was still fresh stuff and it was the first time we actually had a producer help us structure the songs better, to make them work better. Hugh was great with guitar bands, recording live."

— Mick Lynch recalling the recording of Quirk Out.

Jones commented that "the energy Stump had on stage was amazing and we didn’t have a huge amount of time to do this thing," so essentially, with Quirk Out, he and the band were trying to do was get some of that energy onto a record. Aside from Hopper, the rest of the band were not completely comfortable with the recording process as they thought that playing in a studio was "a bit more surgical then just playing live." Jones recalled that "because so much of what they did was visual, one of the things I do remember is that, when we were doing vocals with Mick he kind of almost had to turn himself inside out to exaggerate what he was doing to the point where it seemed funny just by listening to it rather than having the additional benefit of seeing him jerking himself around." Hopper recalled that the recording sessions, and this entire era of the band, were "a happy exciting time. The influences we all brought to the band were working well at this point, even though our democratic writing and rehearsal process was tortuously slow." It had taken the band months to "fashion all the wobbly noises, tumbling drums and lyrics into songs, and unlike most bands, the band contributed equally. Hopper recalled "there was no songwriter coming in with a guitar showing everyone the chords. Instead, we relied on a fine balance of each other’s discrete musical contributions."

== Music ==
Quirk Out presented a unique sound that was highly unlike its more jangle-based C86 peers. Louder Than War characterised Quirk Out as being "full of colliding riffs and a deep, weird groove that was coalesced by Mick’s onstage charisma and natural charm." According to music journalist Martin C. Strong, Quirk Out was "zany, ludicrous and er… fishy as previous encounters, ideas and concepts were plucked from another planet where nutty professors head-danced to 'Tupperware Stripper', 'Bit Part Actor' and 'Kitchen Table'; sanity was restored for the rather well-balanced but still weird, 'Our Fathers'." After critics compared the band's music to Captain Beefheart, Hopper noted that "much was made about the Beefheart influence, but only myself and Rob were fans. Chris and Mick didn’t know his music and didn’t want to get to know it, either. One might equally claim there was a country and western thing going on (Mick’s influence) in songs like 'Everything In Its Place.'" In his review of the album, Simon Reynolds of Melody Maker said that Stump "make bodymusic. But this is not the body of chartpop, tautly hemmed within the slick vocabulary of dance and the familiar vocabulary of cool. This is a body that betrays its owner, a body in dis-grace, a slovenly body (music). 'Everything In Its Place' shows how alive Stump are to the surrealism of human corporeality.

In an interview with International Musician in March 1987, Hopper said that the band's sound is "rooted in not allowing [themselves] to get lazy:" "when we're writing songs we stretch ourselves to the limits of what we can play. It's boring otherwise, isn't it?" On the album, McKhay plays a standard Sonor 5-drum kit, with McKhay being interested in "what can be done on a normal kit" and wanting "to avoid that 'oh, I've run out of ideas, I'll get another piece of kit' syndrome," Hopper plays a fretless Wal through a HH Baby Bass, a compressor which Hopper described as making "a hell of a noise but I like it on full all the time," whilst Salmon plays his offbeat, "wobbly" lines on a standard Stratocaster through an old Selmer Treble n' Bass amplifier and Marshall cap, without any effects.

=== Songs ===
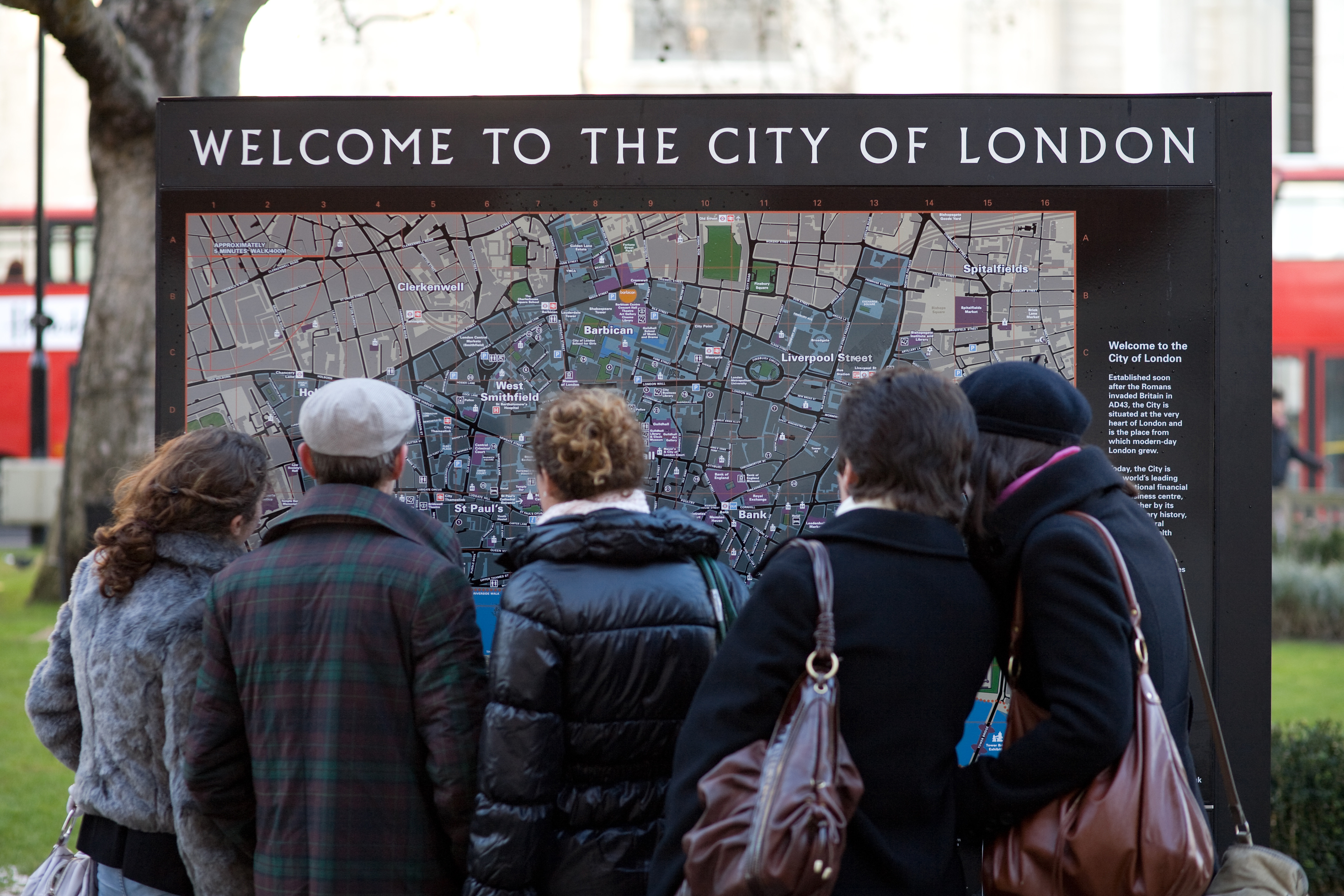
"Buffalo" mocks the behaviour of American tourists in London.

Music journalist Ron Rom said that the "manic" opening song "Tupperware Stripper" "catches the listener out with its offbeat sketch of everyday life." The song is about a man wearing yellowing Y-fronts performing his trademarked exotic dance to a group of middle aged "Tupperware ladies." Team Rock said the song contained a "mischievous smut." "Our Fathers" is less frantic than the other songs, described as having "a touch of the mellow and melodic" by The Rough Guide to Rock, although C. Strong said the song was "still weird" despite it being "rather well-balanced" and the restoration of "sanity". Team Rock said the song presented "shimmering sentimentality." Rom said the song "throws a catchy sparkle across its essentially sad anti-war theme."

After its first appearance on C86, "Buffalo" re-appeared on Quirk Out. The song features lyrics that mock the attitudes of American tourists in England. The song is well known for its refrain "how much is the fish?," which became, in the words of The Quietus, an "indie catchphrase." Scooter later used the phrase as the title of their international hit "How Much Is The Fish?". According to Pitchfork Media, the band exhibit a "bona fide musical virtuosity" on the song, "even if it's bent toward a Carl-Stalling-meets-Captain Beefheart cartoonishness that ultimately provides one of C86's most singular, brilliant moments." Hopper, recalling the writing some time later, said: "I came up with a bass line that was full of discords and slides. Mick had this silly idea that Americans were buffalo reincarnated, and ["Buffalo"] was a satire about Americans in London: “How do I get off the bus,” “Does the fish have chips.” I remember David Thomas from Pere Ubu disliking it." The rapid closing track, "Bit Part Actor", features "frenzied clangour."

== Release and success ==
The album was released as an LP in the UK by the band's own record label Stuff Records on 26 October 1986, although some sources mistake the album's release date as 1987. The album was also released in Australia and France as an LP by Chrysalis Records in 1986. A promotional media "DJ copy" was also distributed in Australia. In spring 1987, Stuff Records re-released the album as a cassette in the UK with the band's earlier EP Mud as a Colon as bonus tracks on the second side. When asked by an unnamed music journalist why the band re-released the album on cassette, Hopper said "a lot of people wanted a cassette because they don't have record players." The band were not fans of the production of Mud as a Colon, but by including it on the second side of the cassette release, it allowed the band to recut that EP as it was highly distorted when first released. The artwork of Quirk Out, designed by Phili Josephs with a backdrop designed by Linda Scott, features a buffalo head designed by Salmon himself.

Due to the band's touring, C86 appearance and positive pieces about them in the British music press, the album turned out to be an unprecedented commercial success for such an independent and uncommercial album. On 26 November, the album entered the UK Independent Albums Chart, where it eventually peaked at number 2, kept off the top spot by The Dead Kennedys' Bedtime for Democracy. It stayed on the chart for an impressive run of 26 weeks, including two whole months in the top five. By April 1987, Quirk Out had completed its 20th consecutive week in the chart, an achievement only matched at the time by The Smiths’ The Queen is Dead. McKahey recalled that "Quirk Out was in the Indie Charts for six months in the Top 10. We got ripped to high heaven like, I know it sold 36,000 in the UK and we never saw literally a penny from that, but we’re in good company." The number of copies sold of Quirk Out is uncertain; although McKahey stated that it sold 36,000 copies, Lynch said it sold 50,000 copies. The Independent, however, stated Quirk Out sold over 50,000 copies.

When Quirk Out was released, the band were all getting paid £100 a week. Hopper recalled that "I remember my rent in London at that time was £16 a week so I felt like a king. I felt like a professional musician, although you couldn’t afford a car or something you could just about ask for a loan for an instrument and gear and then you’d have enough for basic living on top of that." Liam McKahey recalled that "live they were something else because Mick was so animated and you’ve never seen anybody like him. He was like a cartoon really. The combination of the three musicians, I don’t think could have sounded any other way, they were all quite mad. It came very naturally to them to be honest. The fact that they had any success at all commercially still baffles me. Quirk Out wasn’t very normal was it? It was just a fabulous thing to see. I think it was really well deserved because I don’t think there was a live band as good at the time to be honest: Mick’s stage presence; and the musicianship and also Mick’s lyrics."

== Critical reception ==
Professional ratings
Review scores
Source	Rating
The Great Indie Discography (Martin C. Strong)	(7/10)
Melody Maker	(very favourable)
NME	(very favourable)
Sounds	(very favourable)

=== Initial reaction ===
Quirk Out was released to a very favourable reception from the British music press who praised its innovative, offbeat sound, with Louder Than War commenting that the release "was a welcome arrival in a certain sector of the fervent UK underground of the time." Melody Maker called the album "one of the pleasures of 1986." Reviewer Simon Reynolds said "I like the way they accommodate melody and disarray within the same space. I like the way they can go from the paroxysm of "Tupperware Stripper" to the almost-FM gorgeousness of "Our Fathers." Still too indebted to have the stamp of greatness, Stump remain one of the pleasures of 1986." Sounds, running a review of the band with the headline "This is It," featured a full-page colour photograph of Stump and a five star review and "the essence of the review was, this is the most vital and important band in the UK at the moment," describing it as "a riot of innovative genius."

Simon Bailie of Record Mirror said the album "really set [their] taste buds off," noting that "there had been some pointers to the band's talent before this, but with the benefit of a decent budget and an understanding producer, we got a lot closer to their unique vision. The unintentional racket of the early recordings had now gone, and the inspired workings of four very clever artists could now be appreciated." He describes that unlike before, "you can recognize the method behind the noise attack. Kev Hopper's bass and Chris Salmon's guitar might have sounded like exploded bed springs, but that's because they wanted them to sound that way. Mick, meanwhile, sings in a hearty Cork accent about "dandruff and farting and earwax". Like Cathal Coughlan from Microdisney, another native of Cork, Mick has an extremely fertile imagination that often touches on the surreal."

In a positive review believed to be written for Sounds, Ron Rom the band had "finally reached their dazzling potential." He said that Quirk Out "is a very special LP. It manages to bridge the ever-widening gap between the invigorating, enthusiastic but often disappointingly amateur attack of the indie chart bands and the slick commerciality of the chart acts. Within this rich medium, Stump display an oddball, vaudeville character, their idiosyncratic music showing a professional disdain for formularised lyrics and get-rich-quick plagiarism," concluding that "with Quirk Out, Stump prove that being a new independent band in Britain doesn't necessarily mean being dull, derivative or aggressive. When their contemporaries are packing away their guitars and calling it a day, Stump will go from strength to strength." At the end of 1986, the album was placed in numerous year-end best album lists; Sounds placed it on their list of the 50 greatest albums of 1986, whilst NME ranked the album at number 44 in their list of the 50 greatest albums of 1986. Months later, Oskar Matzerath of Melody Maker named it "the finest mini-album of all time."

=== Later assessment ===
The album continued to be greatly acclaimed in later times. Tim Peacock of Record Collector said that Quirk Out remains "Stump’s most satisfying listen, with the cacophonous likes of "Bit-Part Actor" tempered by the discipline of Hugh Jones’ production and the irrepressibly catchy "Our Fathers" even parading a (cough) distinct pop sensibility." When including Stump in their 2014 list of "50 Unfashionable But Brilliant 80s Bands That Time Cruelly Forgot", the NME said that Quirk Out was "the indie chart legend." A reviewer for Farr Out Music said that "Quirk Out became an almost permanent fixture on the turntable of [his] treasured Amstrad Midi System's turntable for the majority of 1987, and [he] was delighted to see Stump play at Liverpool University that year, and it remains to be one of the best gigs [he] have ever been to." Get Into This said that "those brave enough to venture further could find much to enjoy on the Mud on a Colon 12” E.P and their mini-album Quirk Out which found "Buffalo" alongside the equally manic "Tupperware Stripper."" Making note of the album's sound, Tasty Fanzine said that "there are those albums that you like and slip neatly between The Cure's Pornography and Stump’s Quirk Out, not to played until you feel so flippin’ weird that you’ll search for it again." In 2011, Mojo included "Buffalo" in their list of the "100 Greatest British Indie Records of All Time."

The band's touring manager recalled that Roy Weard recalled that "Quirk Out was an unusual record in so many ways. It’s always hard for unusual things to do well, so I was very surprised that they were doing as well as they did. As it went on I realised that it was the sort of music that either grabbed people by the throat and went, listen to me, or turned them off completely and most people seemed to want to listen to it, so it was good. We did a lot of Universities and places like the Sheffield Leadmill, middle-sized venues. I think the biggest thing we ever did when I was working for them was Brixton Academy, we weren't headlining that particular show but we did some big venues all over the place. The crowd response varied a lot, especially outside of the big cities. The big cities got Stump; Edinburgh, Glasgow, London and places like that got Stump, then you’d go to smaller cities and sometimes there was a bit of bafflement. It was like, what is this?"

Commenting on why the album may not have been a larger commercial success in 2016, music journalist Simon Reynolds reflected that "perhaps by calling their album Quirk Out they nailed their colours to the wall a bit too clearly. Quirky became almost like an insult, and they would be lumped in with other bands that were unbearably wacky at that time, [...] so people did accuse Stump of being wilfully goofy and almost like being a comedy act, which I think was unfair because certainly there was room on the scene at that time for a band that wanted to entertain. There was humour in the presentation and in the sound of the group: the elasticated bass lines of Kevin Hopper and the really interesting wiggling writhing rhythms that the whole group created. There was humour prevailing through every fibre of their sound, but I think people have always had a slightly ambivalent attitude about music and humour. Does it mix?" He expressed similar sentiments in his original Melody Maker review, where he called it an "unfortunate title" and a "step into a trap."

== Promotion ==
=== Quirk Out tour ===
The band continued to regularly perform around the UK, and in promotion of Quirk Out, underwent a promotional national tour. When the album was released on cassette, the band played seventeen gigs in April and May 1987. Roy Weard became the band's tour manager for this era, with Weard later reflecting: "I knew Rich Bishop, who was managing the band at the time and he suggested me for the first big Stump tour. It was immediately after Quirk Out came out. I went along to the studio to watch them rehearse, I thought, can these guys play, this doesn’t make any sense. I went home and listened to the album and I went back the following day and listened to them again and I went, oh, I see it makes a lot of sense. It took a day to get my head around the music. The more I heard it, the more sense it made. The immediate impression was, what’s going on? The time signatures and the way it was all put together, the way that the bass led most of it, and Chris filled in on guitar round the edges, and then there was this floating melody line over the top that Mick always used to do." McKahey said "we were headlining the Town & Country, Kentish Town which was big, the Astoria, big headline shows. We always did very well in Holland and Belgium, we did well in Germany, we always did well in cities like Manchester, Glasgow, Nottingham, Newcastle, and we did well in London."

In June 1987, Stump notably played on the NME stage at Glastonbury Festival. Lynch recalled "it had been pissing down and drizzling all day. I had gone down there three days beforehand so I was well in the mood, well into the atmosphere of the place. I came on stage in shorts, mankey dirty, still half-tripping from the night before. Half Man Half Biscuit were on after us and Pop Will Eat Itself were on ahead of us so that was quite a collection. As soon as we came out on stage, the clouds opened and the sun shone down on us. Van Morrison had just gone on the Pyramid stage so suddenly there was about 9,000 people watching us whereas normally there might have been 3,000 or 4,000. The place was jointed; it was one of those gigs that went so easily. The crowd was fucking loving it; we finished and got an encore. As soon as we went off stage, the clouds closed up again and it started raining."

=== Appearances on The Tube ===
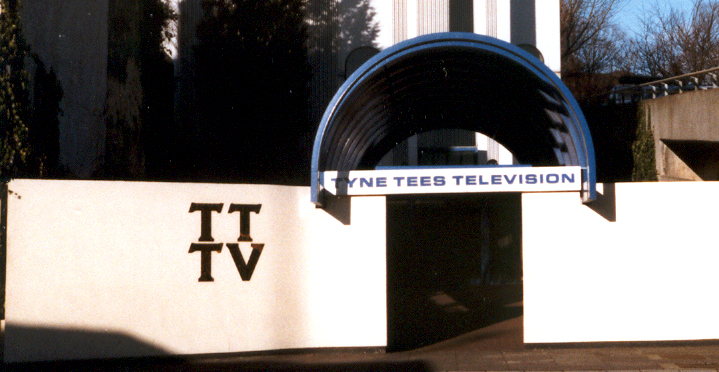
The band made several prolific appearances on The Tube, filmed at Tyne Tees Television (studio entrance pictured in 1999, with the "tube" that inspired the show's name.)

The success of Quirk Out lead to the band being asked in November 1986 to travel to Newcastle to film a simple music video of "Buffalo" for broadcast on Channel 4's alternative music show The Tube on 28 November 1986; the video was produced by the series' staff. Jones recalled that "Quirk Out’s success was a big surprise but the big turning point was when they appeared on The Tube and they did "Buffalo". That sort of swung it for me, I thought, oh blimey, this is going to do something." Prior to filming, there was a technical hitch in the studio so the band "had to adjourn to the local pub for three hours" and became drunk on Newcastle Brown by the time of the video shooting; MacKahey said "I think it actually helped. All that carrying on, jumping around, that’s the drink." The music video helped increase attention to the band; Salmon recalled that the broadcast of the video "was the real breakthrough. That was just fabulous publicity and people still remember that, and it just showed that all you needed was a white background and Mick Lynch for Christ’s sake; you didn’t need any gimmicks or whatever. The Independent said it helped push the band "out of the indie ghetto." Hopper recalled that "kids started singing the memorable chorus of "How much is the fish? How much is the chips?" in the schoolyard… and we were really in business."

The band also performed "Tupperware Stripper" and "Everything In Its Place" live on the show on 6 February 1987 after the Bee Gees cancelled their performance; Lynch recalled that their manager announced the performance to the band on the night of their signing to Ensign Records. The performance followed the infamous incident in which the series' presenter Jools Holland swore on air during a daytime live promo for the show, so "the broadcasting people" were paying close attention to The Tube which they were close to axing due to the controversy, and as such, the show's producer Malcolm Gerrie was worried that the band could cause offence with the lyrics of "Tupperware Stripper", so the band had to change the lyrics slightly and the track became "Censorship Stripper" instead; similarly, though Lynch was nervous, he was careful not to swear, which was "quite prone to doing", "that was it Tyne Tees Television goodbye."

Colm McAuliffe of The Quietus stated that the band became the "darlings" of The Tube. As such, they also appeared on the final ever episode of the show in April 1987 "to hang out and party," where Lynch, McKahey and Steve Mack from That Petrol Emotion were interviewed by Muriel Gray without necessarily promoting Quirk Out or its material; McKahey recalled "the camera was right in our faces and I assumed it was just for close-up shots, but it was actually a very wide-angled camera and I was scratching my nuts [laughing] for the whole interview. My mum was in an awful state. We got the train down from Newcastle the following day and everyone I met said, 'Oh man, you were scratching your balls on the telly in front of millions.' I couldn’t just do the fucking interview. It was good, The Cure were there and Duran Duran and it was all hob-nobbing with superstars. TV exposure is amazing and it was great to get the videos done. And Newcastle’s great, Mick and I always had a great time in Newcastle, we were big drinkers then like. So it was good, The Tube was very, very good." Lynch said that "I came home to Cork on my holidays, I came back for a week or something, it was after The Tube appearance, it was really frightening, I was almost afraid to go out at night, I hadn’t realised how big an impact it had made." Stump are sometimes recognised as being best known for their appearances on The Tube promoting Quirk Out and its tour.

== Aftermath ==
The combination of Quirk Out, the band's relentless touring and their appearances on The Tube, especially "Buffalo"−The Quietus rhapsodising "Lynch bellowing and blaring 'How much is the fish?' into an indie catchphrase still remembered some thirty years on"−prompted interest in the band from major labels interesting in signing them. Ensign Records, an offshoot of the Chrysalis Records, took interest, which in the words of Hopper was "no doubt spurred on by the popularity of the Tube video, the Peel sessions and the live shows. " McKahey said that "Ensign thought [Stump] were fantastic" and that 4AD Records and Mute Records also "sniffed around." Lynch recalled that "obviously [Ensign] thought there was going to be money in it when they saw Quirk Out go to number two in the Indie Charts. It was only The Dead Kennedys kept us off the top. The fact that John Peel liked us helped and that the reviews were good. They followed their nose that way. Ensign were into Irish bands anyway, that was their angle, they liked the music."

The band did eventually sign to Ensign Records, where they released their critically acclaimed but commercially unsuccessful sole full-length album A Fierce Pancake, released in March 1988. The edition of the album released in the United States including "Buffalo" from Quirk Out as a bonus track, as the song was deemed their most popular but was unavailable in the United States.> After the album and its singles were unsuccessful, Ensign Records chose to release "Buffalo" as a single in the UK, some two years after its first release, to revive the band's flagging fortunes, but "this only served to damage inter-band relations even further." Hopper recalled "Ensign were desperate when they re-released 'Buffalo'. They were quite old fashioned when they thought a 'hit' would sustain the band. It was a two year old song, it didn't feel good for morale to do that. And that last performance was pretty awful, four very impatient people on stage bickering and playing everything really fast. It wasn't good. There was some relief when we broke up, I just wonder if we'd had a long break at that time whether we would have come back and resumed? The problem was both Mick and Rob had had enough of London." Although the single was the only, belated single released from Quirk Out, it was also the band's final release during their lifetime and they split-up shortly afterwards.

Quirk Out has not been re-released on compact disc or any format since 1987, the album having been out of print since the late 1980s. However, Sanctuary Records released The Complete Anthology 3-CD set, also known as A Fierce Pancake & Before: The Complete Anthology, in March 2008, containing remastered versions of all the band's material, including Quirk Out. However, that compilation itself is out of print today. Nonetheless, in 2015, Cherry Red Records released Does the Fish Have Chips?: Early and Late Works 1986–1989, a single CD compilation featuring remastered editions of all the band's originally released material except A Fierce Pancake. This is the most recent release of the six songs from Quirk Out.

== Track listing ==
All songs written by Stump

=== Side one ===
1. "Tupperware Stripper" – 4:01
2. "Our Fathers" – 3:27
3. "Kitchen Table" – 2:53

=== Side two ===
4. "Buffalo" – 3:54
5. "Everything In Its Place" – 2:48
6. "Bit Part Actor" – 2:12

=== Cassette version ===
==== Side one ====
1. "Tupperware Stripper" – 4:01
2. "Our Fathers" – 3:27
3. "Kitchen Table" – 2:53
4. "Buffalo" – 3:54
5. "Everything In Its Place" – 2:48
6. "Bit Part Actor" – 2:12

==== Side two (Mud on a Colon EP) ====
7. "Orgasm Way" – 4:24
8. "Ice the Levant" – 2:31
9. "Grab Hands" – 3:36
10. "50-0-55" – 2:47

== Personnel ==
=== Stump ===
- Stump – writing
- Mick Lynch – vocals
- Chris Salmon – guitar, artwork (creator of the buffalo)
- Kev Hopper – bass guitar, sampler
- Robert McKahey – drums, bodhran

=== Additional ===
- Artwork – Phili Josephs − artwork
- Linda Scott − artwork (backdrop)
- Rob – Graphics (lyric sheet)
- Mike Prior – photography
- Steve Double – photography
- Hugh Jones – producer
