= Black River Falls (album) =

Studio album by Cathal Coughlan
- Released: October 2000
- Label: Cooking Vinyl

Black River Falls is the second album from Cathal Coughlan. It was released in October 2000 on Cooking Vinyl Records (COOKCD 126).

== Track listing ==
Black River Falls track listing
No.	Title	Length
1.	"The Ghost of Limehouse Cut"	3:24
2.	"Officer Material"	4:36
3.	"The Bacon Singer"	3:32
4.	"Black River Falls"	4:38
5.	"Payday"	3:32
6.	"Dark Parlour"	5:21
7.	"Out Among the Ruins"	4:53
8.	"God Bless Mr X"	3:36
9.	"Frankfurt Cowboy Yodel"	4:34
10.	"N.C."	5:05
11.	"Whitechapel Mound"	4:24
12.	"Cast Me Out in My Hometown"	4:06
Total length:		51:41

== Personnel ==
=== Artists ===
- Cathal Coughlan - vocals, piano, guitars, organ, vibes
- Nick Bagnall - guitars
- Dave Gregory - guitars
- Joe Gore - guitars
- Aindrias O Gruama - electric guitar
- Dawn Kenny - vocals
- Daniel Manners - double bass
- Tim Bradshaw - harmonica
- Renaud Pion - bass clarinet, bass flute, clarinet, Turkish clarinet
- Nicholas Tiompan Allum - drums, wind
- Rob Allum - percussion

=== Producers ===
- Tracks 2–12 produced by Cathal Coughlan, Mark Rutherford and Philipp Erb
- Track 1 produced Cathal Coughlan and Nick Bagnall
