= 39 Minutes =

Studio album by Microdisney
- Released: 1988
- Genre: Pop
- Length: 37:49 (Vinyl)
- Label: Virgin
- Producer: Jamie Lane

Microdisney chronology
Crooked Mile (1987)	39 Minutes (1988)	The Peel Sessions Album (1989)

Singles from 39 Minutes
- 1. "Singer's Hampstead Home " / "She Only Gave In to Her Anger" Released: October 1987; 2. "Gale Force Wind " / "I Can't Say No (Betty Lou Version)" Released: February 1988

39 Minutes is the fourth and final studio album by the Irish pop group Microdisney, released in 1988. It was a commercial disappointment. The first single was "Singer's Hampstead Home", allegedly a criticism of Boy George's celebrity persona. It was followed by the release, from this album, of Microdisney's final single, "Gale Force Wind", which reached number 98 on the UK singles chart.

== Critical reception ==
Professional ratings
Review scores
Source	Rating
AllMusic	3/5 stars
The Virgin Encyclopedia of Eighties Music	3/5 stars

The album attracted some derisive reviews at the time, with singer Cathal Coughlan saying in a 2022 interview with the BBC, "The press on 39 Minutes, as I recall, was pretty bad." David Stubbs, in a review for Melody Maker, described the album as "horrible, frankly". However, the album was acclaimed by Hot Press as "some of the best and most provocative pop music ever to have emanated from this country".

Trouser Press later opined that 39 Minutes "restores the group's sense of purpose, balancing the slick production of recent efforts with a slightly more aggressive attack and Coughlan's sharpest lyrics in ages."

== Track listing ==
All tracks composed by Cathal Coughlan and Sean O'Hagan.

Side one

1. "Singer's Hampstead Home" (4:02)
2. "High & Dry" (3:04)
3. "Send Herman Home" (4:03)
4. "Ambulance for One" (3:26)
5. "Soul Boy" (5:04)

Side two

1. "Back to the Old Town" (3:13)
2. "United Colours" (3:16)
3. "Gale Force Wind" (3:57)
4. "Herr Direktor" (3:42)
5. "Bluerings" (3:55)
