= Bertie's Brochures =

Studio album by The Fatima Mansions
- Released: 1991
- Genre: Alternative rock
- Length: 25:30
- Label: Kitchenware
- Producer: Cathal Coughlan, Ralph Jezzard

The Fatima Mansions chronology
Viva Dead Ponies (1990)	Bertie's Brochures (1991)	Valhalla Avenue (1992)

Bertie's Brochures is a mini-album released in 1991 by Irish rock band The Fatima Mansions. Recorded and released between Viva Dead Ponies and Valhalla Avenue, the mini-album found the band displaying their more subtle side, with the record being dominated by slower, piano-led ballads such as the title track and their cover of Scott Walker's "Long About Now", although their radically altered take on REM's "Shiny Happy People" and "Mario Vargas Yoni" represented the band's noisier and more scathing side too.

The EP was primarily a way of showcasing the songs "Behind The Moon" and "Bertie's Brochures" which had been played since The Fatima Mansions' earliest gigs in 1989, but had not fit in with either of their albums at this point.

== Track listing ==
All tracks composed by Cathal Coughlan; except where indicated

1. "Behind the Moon" (3:47)
2. "Bertie's Brochures" (5:15)
3. "Shiny Happy People" (Bill Berry, Michael Stipe, Mike Mills, Peter Buck) - (3:17)
4. "VN (Apology)" (1:21)
5. "Mario Vargas Yoni" (2:30)
6. "Smiling" (3:05)
7. "Long About Now" (Scott Engel) - (1:53)
8. "The Great Valerio" (Richard Thompson) - (4:26)

== Personnel ==
The Fatima Mansions

- Cathal Coughlan
- Andrías Ó Grúama
- Hugh Bunker
- Nick Allum
- Nick Bagnall

Technical

- Victor Van Vugt - engineer
- Lawrence Bogle - cover illustration
