= Song of Co-Aklan =

Studio album by Cathal Coughlan
- Released: 2021
- Recorded: 2019
- Studio: London

Cathal Coughlan chronology
Rancho Tetrahedron (2010)	Song of Co-Aklan (2021)

Song of Co-Aklan is the sixth and final solo album by the Irish singer / songwriter Cathal Coughlan. It was recorded in London just before the COVID-19 pandemic and released in 2021.

Coughlan started writing the album in 2016, and the song 'The Lobster's Dream, had originally had been written for a W.B. Yeats commemoration show at the National Concert Hall, Dublin in 2015. In a detailed, open and comprehensive interview with John Robb, Coughlan discusses how he writes songs, saying that that when songwriting he is led by the music, and the words, except maybe a title, come later. He refers to a "Co-Aklan re-brand", "rampant untruths", and that the album has a theme of identity and identities, and he refers to his own identity as a 'stateless person' and his relationship with Ireland. When concluding about his lyrics he says ''they wouldn't be songs if I knew exactly what they're about'. He shares that his longterm veganism influenced some of the songs about animals. And finally in the interview, Coughlan revealed to Robb that he'd left a few songs off 'Song of Co-Aklan' that he might put onto an EP in the future.

The album received good reviews on its release and is considered the peak of his solo career. Some reviewers have written about the concept of the album and that the lyrics had been written from the point of view of Coughlan's alter-ego Co Aklan. According to critic Neil Hodge's review he describes this as how the listener is drawn in "from the opening bars of the albums title track....into the world of Co Aklan [with] perfectly obtuse lyrics with a deeper meaning, alongside Coughlan’s welcoming dynamic vocal."

== Track listing ==
All songs written by Cathal Coughlan.

1. Song Of Co-Aklan (3:43)
2. Passed-Out Dog (3:11)
3. My Child Is Alive! (3:29)
4. Crow Mother (3:48)
5. St Wellbeing Axe (2:38)
6. Owl In The Parlour (4:15)
7. Let's Flood The Fairground (3:33)
8. The Lobster's Dream (4:48)
9. The Copper Beech (4:14)
10. The Knockout Artist (3:25)
11. Falling Out North Street (3:32)
12. Unrealtime (3:39)

== Personnel ==
- Cathal Coughlan – vocals
- Nick Allum - Drums and Percussion (all tracks except 9)
- Audrey Riley - Cello (2,3,4,6,8,11)
- James Woodrow - Electric & Acoustic Guitar (1,2,3,5,6,7,8,11)
- Rhodri Marsden - Bass Guitar (3,4,6,7,8) Bassoon (3)
- Luke Haines - Bass (1,2,5) Baritone Guitars (1) Acoustic Guitar (7) The Synth (1,2)
- Jonathan Fell - Bass Guitar (10,11)
- Sean O'Hagan - Bass Guitar (12) Vocals (12) The Synth & The Turnaround Chord (10)
- Eileen Gogan - Vocals (12)
- Aindrías Ó Grúama - Frictive Guitar (5)
- John Bennett - Vocals (10) Silde Guitar (10)
- Cory Gray - Wurlitzer Piano (11)
