= Nite Flights (song) =

Song by The Walker Brothers

Song by The Walker Brothers

from the album Nite Flights
- Released: July 1978
- Recorded: February 1978
- Studio: Scorpio Sound, London
- Genre: Art rock, pop, rock
- Length: 4:25
- Label: GTO
- Songwriter: Scott Engel
- Producers: Scott Walker and Dave MacRae

"Nite Flights" is a song by the American singer-songwriter Scott Walker under his given name Scott Engel. It was first recorded and released by Walker's pop group The Walker Brothers as the title track of their final album, 1978's Nite Flights.

== Personnel ==
- John Walker and Scott Walker - Vocals
- Dave MacRae - Keyboards
- Frank Gibson - Drums
- Mo Foster and Scott Walker - Basses
- The Walker Brothers - Arrangements
- Dave MacRae - Orchestrations and Conductor
- Scott Walker and Dave MacRae - Producer
- Dennis Weinreich - Recording
- Scott Walker, Dave MacRae and Dennis Weinreich - Mixing

== David Bowie version ==
"Nite Flights" was first covered by the English musician David Bowie in 1993 for his album Black Tie White Noise. Along with all the other songs on Black Tie White Noise, this version uses heavy electronic sounds, including electronic drums and multiple synthesizers.

Bowie remarked that he was introduced to Scott Walker when he dated one of Walker's ex-girlfriends. Reportedly, she enjoyed Walker's music more than Bowie's, and played Walker's albums constantly.

A live performance of the song from a 1995 show during Bowie's Outside Tour was included on the release Ouvrez le Chien (Live Dallas 95) (2020).

=== Versions ===
- Album version - 4:30
- Moodswings Back to Basics Remix – 10:01

== The Fatima Mansions cover ==
"Nite Flights"

Single by The Fatima Mansions

from the album Lost in the Former West
- Released: 1994
- Recorded: 1994
- Genre: Art rock
- Length: 3:52
- Label: Kitchenware, Radioactive
- Songwriter: Scott Engel
- Producers: Jerry Harrison, Ralph Jezzard

The Fatima Mansions singles chronology
"The Loyaliser" (1994)	"Nite Flights" (1994)

"Nite Flights" was recorded by the art rock group The Fatima Mansions in 1994 for their album Lost in the Former West. It was also released as a single on UK Radioactive/Kitchenware the same year. The single also included a remix of the song by The Blood Of The Lamb titled "It's So Cold.... I Think".

=== Track listing ===
Kitchenware Records – SKCD 68
No.	Title	Writer(s)	Length
1.	"Nite Flights"	S. Engel	3:52
2.	"As I Washed The Blood Off"	Cathal Coughlan	5:02
3.	"Diamonds, Fur Coat, Champagne"	Rev, Vega	3:28
4.	"It's So Cold.... I Think"	Engel, Coughlan	5:24

== Other sources ==
- Black Tie White Noise Limited Edition DVD (2004)
- The Trouser Press
