= Obi (band) =

- Origin: United Kingdom
- Genres: Post-Britpop; Indie pop
- Years active: 2002–2004

Obi were a British indie-pop group. Their debut mini-album, The Magic Land of Radio, had eight tracks and was released in 2002. They followed up with a full-time album, Diceman Lopez, produced by Hugh Jones in 2004. It contains material ranged from Post-Britpop to folk-rock and country to Gypsy and tejano music stylisations. That year they also appeared on the Acoustic Stage at the Glastonbury Festival.

The band's single Somewhere Nicer, taken from The Magic Land of Radio, was used in British television commercials for Haven and British Holidays in 2008 and DFS Furniture in 2018.

The band consisted of Damian Katkhuda, Dom Hazlehurst, Tom Worsley, and Ben Kempton.

== Discography ==
=== Albums ===
- The Magic Land of Radio (2002)
- Diceman Lopez (2004)

=== Singles and EPs ===
- "Big Sky EP" (2002)
- "What's in a Name" (2002)
- "Somewhere Nicer" (2002)
- "To Some Folk" (2003)
- "Creatures" (2004)
