= Lost in the Former West =

Studio album by the Fatima Mansions
- Released: 1994
- Genre: Alternative rock
- Length: 48:45
- Label: Kitchenware, Radioactive
- Producer: Ralph Jezzard, Jerry Harrison, Gil Norton

The Fatima Mansions chronology
Come Back My Children (1992)	Lost in the Former West (1994)

Lost in the Former West is the final album by Irish rock band the Fatima Mansions, released in 1994. Writing for Hot Press, Liam Fay said that it is "both Fatima Mansions’ most accessible and most ambitious release yet. It revisits virtually all the bases that the band has touched during its previous four albums but maintains a cohesion and easy-appeal throughout. More than anything else, it is the sound of a group who feel that their time has finally come."

As with Viva Dead Ponies, the song listing as released in the US differed from the UK version, incorporating "Something Bad" and "Go Home Bible Mike" from Valhalla Avenue, while excluding "Sunken Cities". The track "Nite Flights" is a cover of the Walker Brothers song.

== Track listing ==
All songs written by Cathal Coughlan, except where noted.

1. "Belong Nowhere" (4:52)
2. "The Loyaliser" (3:14)
3. "Popemobile to Paraguay" (4:39)
4. "Walk Yr Way" (4:58)
5. "Brunceling's Song" (4:02)
6. "Lost in the Former West" (2:48)
7. "Nite Flights" (Scott Walker) (3:49)
8. "Your World Customer" (3:31)
9. "Sunken Cities" (3:53)
10. "Brain Blister" (3:57)
11. "A Walk in the Woods" (5:11)
12. "Humiliate Me" (3:43)

== Personnel ==
- Cathal Coughlan – vocals, occasional keyboards
- Andrías Ó Gruama – guitar
- Nick Bagnall – keyboards
- Hugh Bunker – bass guitar
- Nicholas Tiompan Allum – drums, wind
