= Kev Hopper =

English bass guitarist

Kev Hopper (born 1961) is an English bass guitarist.

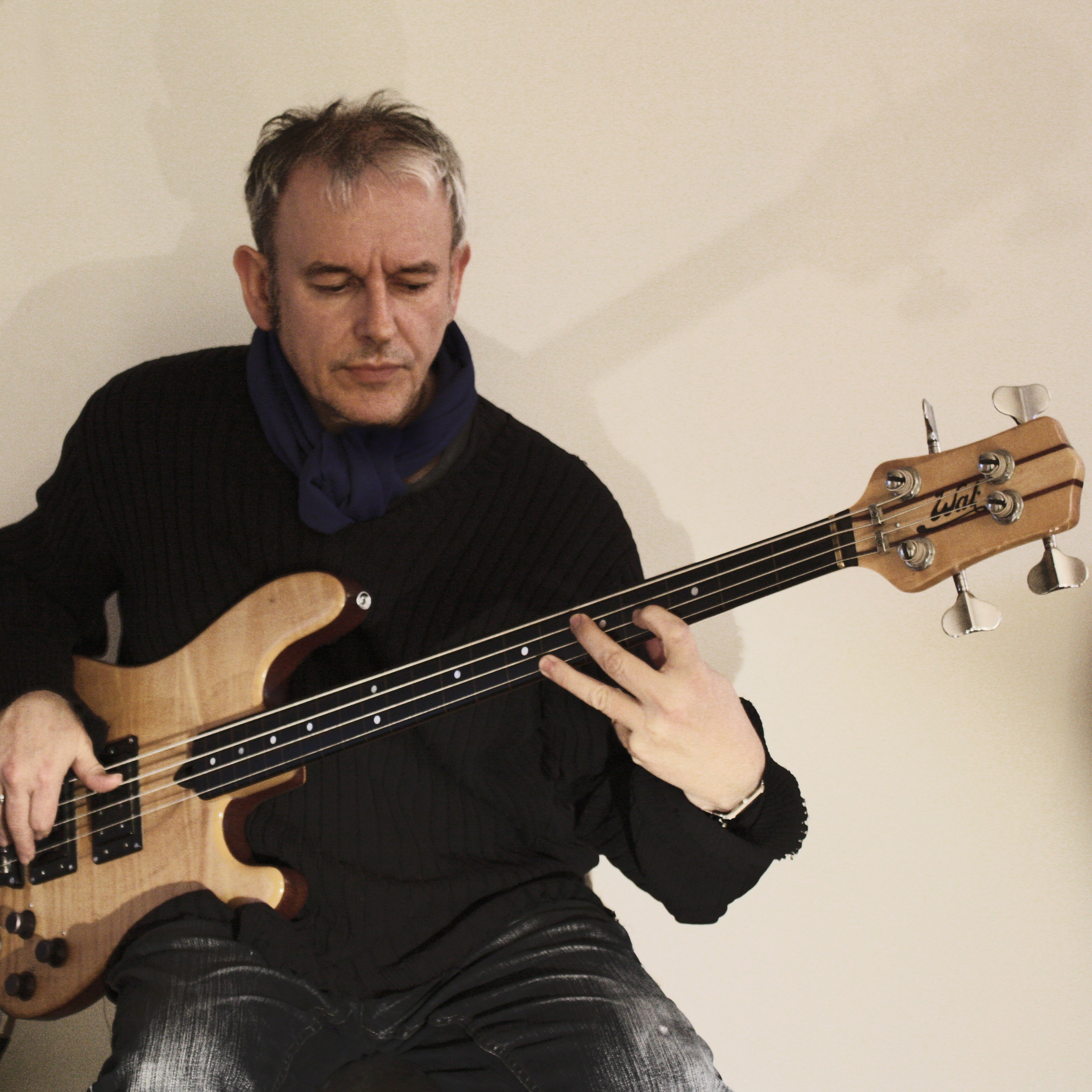
Kev Hopper, bass guitarist

== Life and career ==
Hopper is best known for his work as bass guitarist for the band Stump, an Anglo/Irish indie/experimental/rock group formed in London in 1983. Stump released two albums, the self released mini album Quirk Out in 1986 and their only full-length release A Fierce Pancake in 1988. Since the late 1980s, his mainly instrumental output has been diverse and best described as a hybrid style of experimental electronica and melodic pop with his distinctive bass playing often to the fore. Two bands dominated his post-Stump years: the laptop quartet, Ticklish (1998–2005) and the bass guitar, riff-dominated Prescott (2012–2018) featuring Scritti Politti keyboardist Rhodri Marsden, drummer Frank Byng, and Pere Ubu guitarist, Keith Moliné.

Hopper is also a visual artist (painter).

== Discography ==
=== Solo albums ===
- Stolen Jewels (1990), Ghetto Records
- The Stinking Rose (1993), retrospective Bandcamp digital release
- Spoombung (1998), Thoofa
- Whispering Foils (2000) Drag City/Duophonic
- Saurus (2002), Drag City/ Afterhours [Japan]
- I Saw Spoombung's Daughter Consumed by Kirby Dots (2005), Afterhours (Japan)
- The Germjoin (2012), Afterhours (Japan)
- Tonka Beano (2013), Linear Obsessional Records
- Kevlington (2015), Bandcamp digital release
- Corbyn Sceptic Club (2018), Linear Obsessional Records
- Moving and Handling (2020), Bandcamp digital release
- Peppa Vesticle (2021), Bandcamp digital release
- Sans Noodles (2022), Dimple Discs
- XiX (2025), Dimple Discs

=== with Stump ===
- Mud on a Colon EP (1986), Ron Johnson (UK Indie #39)
- Quirk Out (1986), Stuff (UK Indie #2)
- The Peel Sessions EP (1987), Strange Fruit (UK Indie #13)
- A Fierce Pancake (1988), Ensign
- Chaos (1988), Ensign
- Charlton Heston, (1988) Ensign (UK #72)
- Buffalo (1988), Ensign
- The Complete Anthology box set (2008), Sanctuary
- Does the Fish Have Chips? (2014) Cherry Red Records

=== with Ticklish ===
- Ticklish (2000), GROB
- Rubato (joint E.P. with Fizzarum, 2005) Textile Records
- Here Are Your New Instructions (2005) Textile Records

=== with Prescott ===
- One Did (2014) Slowfoot Records
- Thing or Two (2017) Bandcamp digital release. Thoofa Records
