= The Fatima Mansions =

Irish rock band (1988–1995)

- the Fatima Mansions in 1991

Background information
- Origin: Cork, Ireland
- Genres: Art rock; industrial rock
- Years active: 1988–1995
- Label: Radioactive Records
- Past members: Cathal Coughlan; Andrias O'Gruama; Zak Woolhouse; Hugh Bunker; Nick Allum; Nick Bagnall; Nick Bunker; Jonathan Fell; Paul Murphy

The Fatima Mansions were an Irish rock band formed in 1988 by songwriter and vocalist Cathal Coughlan, formerly of Microdisney.

== Career ==
The band's first recording and tour line-up consisted of Coughlan (songwriter/producer/arranger/keyboards/vocals), Aindrias O'Gruama (guitar), Nick Allum (drums), Jonathan Fell (bass), Zac Woolhouse (keyboards). Bassist Nick Bunker joined before the recording of their second album. They took their name from the Fatima Mansions corporation flats in Rialto, Dublin.

The Fatima Mansions were a popular live band, and gained indie chart success with their albums Viva Dead Ponies, Bertie's Brochures, Valhalla Avenue and Lost in the Former West.

They entered the Top 10 of the UK singles chart in 1992 with a heavily reworked version of Bryan Adams' song "(Everything I Do) I Do It for You", taken from an NME tribute album in aid of the charity, the Spastics Society. The single was a double A-side; the flip-track, Manic Street Preachers' version of "Suicide Is Painless" received most of the radio airplay. They also gained mainstream exposure by opening a European leg of U2's Zoo TV Tour in 1992, although they were nearly booed off the stage and almost started a riot when front man Coughlan swore at a Milan audience and insulted the Pope. The band often courted controversy with religion, dictators, empires and general authority being targets for Coughlan's vitriol. Despite this, The Guardian newspaper described him as "the most underrated lyricist in pop today", and DJ John Peel said he could "listen to Cathal Coughlan sing the phone book".

The album and singles campaign for 1994's Lost in the Former West was styled on the glamour of Liberace, and featured a cover version of The Walker Brothers's "Nite Flights".

== Discography ==
=== Singles ===
- "Only Losers Take the Bus" (1989), Kitchenware
- "Blues for Ceausescu" (1990), Kitchenware
- "Hive" E.P. (1991), Kitchenware
- "The Only Solution: Another Revolution" (1991), Radioactive
- "You're a Rose" (1991), Kitchenware/Radioactive
- "Everything I Do (I Do It For You)" (1992), Columbia – UK No. 7, IRE No. 12
- "Evil Man" (1992), Kitchenware/Radioactive – UK No. 59
- "1000%" (1992), Kitchenware/Radioactive – UK No. 61
- "Tíma Mansió Dumps the Dead" (1992), Radioactive
- "The Loyaliser" (1994), Kitchenware/Radioactive – UK No. 58
- "Nite Flights" (1994), Kitchenware/Radioactive

=== Albums ===
- Against Nature – (1989) – UK Indie No. 12
- Viva Dead Ponies – (1990)
- Bertie's Brochures – (1991)
- Valhalla Avenue – (1992) – UK No. 52
- Come Back My Children – (1992)
- Lost in the Former West – (1994)

== Sources ==
- McDermott, Paul. "Iron Fist in Velvet Glove — the story of Microdisney". Audio documentary, Newstalk / University College Cork, 2018
