= Against Nature (album) =

Studio album by the Fatima Mansions
- Released: September 1989
- Recorded: London, 1989
- Genre: Alternative rock
- Label: Kitchenware
- Producer: Jamie Lane

The Fatima Mansions chronology
Against Nature (1989)	Viva Dead Ponies (1990)

Professional ratings
Review scores
Source	Rating
AllMusic	3/5 stars

Against Nature is the debut album by Irish rock band the Fatima Mansions. It was released in September 1989, receiving almost universal critical acclaim, described by NME as "staggering in its weight of ideas...never loses its capacity to suddenly stun you", and also described as "a startlingly well-rounded debut". A review from AllMusic stated, "Coughlan's lyrics are similarly aggressive throughout, with actions of overt and implicit violence in nearly every song and a grouchily misanthropic, almost nihilistic lyrical world-view throughout".

Against Nature reached No. 12 in the UK Indie Chart.

The album would later be compiled with other pre-Viva Dead Ponies work of the Fatima Mansions on the 1992 Come Back My Children compilation album, while "Only Losers Take the Bus" would also feature on the American edition of Viva Dead Ponies. Later re-issues and re-print releases of the album were in 2021 with the digital streaming version containing extra tracks including "Blues for Ceaușescu" and in 2026 an exclusive blue vinyl re-print by Inis Records.

== Track listing ==
All tracks composed and arranged by Cathal Coughlan

1. "Only Losers Take the Bus" (3:08)
2. "The Day I Lost Everything" (4:16)
3. "Wilderness on Time" (3:15)
4. "You Won't Get Me Home" (3:01)
5. "13th Century Boy" (4:00)
6. "Bishop of Babel" (2:53)
7. "Valley of the Dead Cars" (3:19)
8. "Big Madness/Monday Club Carol" (4:38)

== Personnel ==
- Cathal Coughlan – vocals, keyboards, programming
- Andrías Ó Grúama – guitar
- Zac Woolhouse – keyboards
- John Fell – bass guitar
- Nicholas Tiompan Allum – drums, wind

Technical

- Bill Gill, Jamie Lane, Martin Harrison, Ralph Jezzard - engineer
- Lawrence Bogle - cover illustration
