= Crooked Mile (album) =

Studio album by Microdisney
- Released: 1987
- Genre: Pop
- Length: 47:27
- Label: Virgin
- Producer: Lenny Kaye

Microdisney chronology
| The Clock Comes Down the Stairs (1985) | Crooked Mile (1987) | 39 Minutes (1988) |

Singles from Crooked Mile
- 1. "Town to Town" / "Little Town In Ireland" Released: 1 February 1987

Crooked Mile is the third studio album by Irish pop band Microdisney. It was their first album for major label Virgin Records, after the release of their previous albums on Rough Trade Records. It was produced by Lenny Kaye, the former guitarist of the Patti Smith Group.

The track "Town to Town" was their most successful single in the UK, reaching number 55 on the UK singles chart.

The New Musical Express placed the album at number 47 of its list of the best albums released in 1987.

== Track listing ==
All tracks composed by Cathal Coughlan and Sean O'Hagan.

Side one

1. "Town to Town" (3:19)
2. "Angels" (3:41)
3. "Our Children" (4:33)
4. "Mrs. Simpson" (3:54)
5. "Hey Hey Sam" (4:19)
6. "Give Me All of Your Clothes" (4:02)

Side two

1. "Armadillo Man" (3:04)
2. "Bullwhip Road" (3:37)
3. "And He Descended into Hell" (3:46)
4. "Rack" (4:29)
5. "Big Sleeping House" (3:03)
6. "People Just Want to Dream" (5:17)

== Personnel ==
- Cathal Coughlan — lead vocals, keyboards, flexatone
- Sean O'Hagan — guitar, backing vocals, harmonica
- James Compton — keyboards, backing vocals, accordion
- Steve Pregnant — bass
- Tom Fenner — drums, backing vocals, percussion
- Lenny Kaye — backing vocals
- Bill Gill — tambourine
