= Valhalla Avenue =

Studio album by the Fatima Mansions
- Released: 1992
- Genre: Alternative rock
- Length: 44:54
- Label: Kitchenware
- Producers: Ralph Jezzard, Victor Van Vugt, Cathal Coughlan

The Fatima Mansions chronology
Bertie's Brochures (1991)	Valhalla Avenue (1992)	Come Back My Children (1992)

Valhalla Avenue is an album by Irish alternative rock act the Fatima Mansions. Released in 1992 by Kitchenware Records, the album included the singles "Evil Man" and "1000%". Frontman Cathal Coughlan wrote, and with the assistance of Ralph Jezzard and Victor Van Vugt, produced and engineered the album.

A limited edition was also released with several bonus tracks, including obscure cover versions of R.E.M.'s "Shiny Happy People" and Ministry's "Stigmata".

The album reached number 52 on the UK Albums Chart.

== Critical reception ==
Professional ratings
Review scores
Source	Rating
AllMusic	3/5 stars
The Encyclopedia of Popular Music	4/5 stars
Select	4/5 stars

The Chicago Reader wrote that the album contains "some strikingly tuneful songs." Select called it "compulsive, sick, angelic music for the permanently aggrieved."

== Track listing ==
All songs written by Cathal Coughlan.

1. "Evil Man" (4:12)
2. "Something Bad" (3:04)
3. "Valhalla Avenue" (3:19)
4. "1000%" (3:58)
5. "North Atlantic Wind" (4:21)
6. "Purple Window" (5:01)
7. "Go Home Bible Mike" (3:40)
8. "Perfumes of Paradise" (3:03)
9. "Greyhair" (4:26)
10. "C^7/Breakfast with Bandog" (3:31)
11. "Ray of Hope, Hoe of Rape" (4:15)
12. "Be Dead" (2:05)

== Personnel ==
- Cathal Ó Cochláin – vocals, robot keyboards
- Sister Mary Ó Gruama – guitar
- Duke Ó Málaithe – keyboards
- Hugh Bunker – bass guitar
- Nicholas Tiompan Allum – drums, woodwind scoring

Additional musicians;-

- Simon Picard – soprano saxophone on "North Atlantic Wind"
- Ann Rodgers - vocals on "North Atlantic Wind"
- Mike Williams - clarinet on "Greyhair" and "Perfumes of Paradise"
