= Holger Hiller =

German musician (born 1956)

- Born: 26 December 1956 (age 69)
- Origin: Hamburg, Germany
- Genres: Neue Deutsche Welle; German music
- Occupations: Vocalist; remixer; producer
- Instrument: Sampler
- Years active: 1980–present
- Labels: ZickZack Records; AtaTak; Cherry Red; Mute Records

Holger Hiller (born 26 December 1956) is a German musician.

Hiller studied art at the Hochschule für bildende Künste in Hamburg, where he met Walter Thielsch and Thomas Fehlmann and recorded first works with them. With Fehlmann he later founded the band Palais Schaumburg in 1980, of which he was the singer. At the same time his solo career began. Hiller was one of the first musicians in Europe to use the sampler as his main or sole instrument.

From 1984 on, he lived in London, eventually working as producer for Mute Records. In 1988, he started a band project called Ohi Ho Bang Bang with video artist Akiko Hada, recording a song/video called "The Two," releasing it as both a 12" single and a CD Video. The video shows Hiller and Karl Bonnie creating different sounds from every item in a room, which Hada edited together to make a song out of the sounds whilst keeping the video footage of their creation intact. This transfer of sampling techniques from music to video might have been pioneering; only 10 years later, it got popular with "Timber" by Coldcut, who used custom-made software to create it.

Since 2003, Hiller lives in Berlin, working as an English language teacher. He has a son with Japanese musician Izumi Kobayashi, musician Ken Kobayashi.

== Discography ==
- Konzentration der Kräfte (Duo-EP, Holger Hiller/ Walter Thielsch)
- Das ist Schönheit (compilation, double-LP, 1980, recorded at Kunsthochschule Hamburg, songs by Holger Hiller and Thomas Fehlmann)

=== with Palais Schaumburg ===
- Träneninvasion, Single (ZickZack Records, 1979)
- Macht mich glücklich wie nie, Single (ZickZack Records, 1980)
- Telefon/Kinder der Tod, Single (ZickZack Records, 1981)
- Palais Schaumburg, LP (Phonogram Records, 1981)

=== Solo works and other projects ===
- Holger Hiller, Solo EP (AtaTak, 1980)
- Ein Bündel Fäulnis in der Grube, LP (AtaTak, 1983)
- Guten Morgen Hose (short opera), EP with Andreas Dorau (Atatak, 1985)
- Oben Im Eck, LP (Mute Records, London, 1994; also released with Ein Bündel Fäulnis (1992) on a single CD in 1994)
- Ohi Ho Bang Bang--"The Three" 12"/CD Video, with Karl Bonnie and Akiko Hada (Mute Records, 1988)
- As Is, LP (Mute Records, London, 1992)
- Demixed, LP (Mute Records, London, 1993)
- The Fall of a Queen or The Taste of the Fruit to Come, Video, London (Music Holger Hiller, directing and text Wolfgang Müller, camera Akiko Hada, TV Prod. Channel 4, 1994
- Unerhört, concept: Wolfgang Müller, radio play, Bayerischer Rundfunk (with the voices of deaf people), 1995
- Little Present, CD (Mute Records, London, 1995)
- holger hiller, LP (Mute Records, London, 2000)
