= Microdisney =

Irish band

- Coughlan and O'Hagan in the late 1980s

Background information
- Origin: Cork, Ireland
- Genres: Pop
- Years active: 1980–1988; 2018–2019
- Labels: Reekus; Kabuki; Rough Trade; Virgin
- Spinoffs: The Fatima Mansions; The High Llamas
- Past members: Cathal Coughlan; Sean O'Hagan; Giordaí Ua Laoghaire; Nick Montgomery; Jon Fell; Dave Galvin; Chris McCarthy; Aisling Hayden; Rob McKahey; Tom Fenner; James Compton

Microdisney were an Irish rock band formed in Cork in 1980. They were founded and led by songwriters Cathal Coughlan (keyboards, vocals) and Sean O'Hagan (guitar). Originally typeset as Micro Disney, the band had become Microdisney by the time they (Coughlan and O'Hagan) had relocated to London in 1983 and signed to Rough Trade Records. Between 1983 and 1986 the band recorded six Peel Sessions for BBC Radio and released their debut album for Rough Trade called Everybody Is Fantastic.

In 1985, their album The Clock Comes Down the Stairs reached number one in the UK Indie Chart, and they reached number 55 in the UK Singles Chart and the top 40 in Ireland with the 1987 single "Town to Town". This single, released by Virgin Records, was followed into the UK chart by "Gale Force Wind" in March 1988. That July, days after supporting David Bowie at London's Dominion Theatre, the band split up.

O'Hagan and Coughlan formed separate bands, the High Llamas and the Fatima Mansions, respectively, with Coughlan also going on to work with Sean Hughes in Bubonique and Luke Haines as part of The North Sea Scrolls project. In 2017, a radio documentary was made about the band called Iron Fist in Velvet Glove – The Story of Microdisney by producer Paul McDermott, which was re-broadcast by Newstalk 106-108fm as part of their Documentary on Newstalk season.

In 2018, Microdisney reunited for the first time in 30 years, performing live in Dublin and London. In February 2019, they played their last shows in Dublin and Cork. The members of Microdisney were awarded an IMRO/NCH Trailblazer Award, given to "culturally important" Irish albums (in this instance, for The Clock Comes Down the Stairs) in 2018.

A 2024 documentary, titled Microdisney: The Clock Comes Down the Stairs and focusing on the band's formation and career and reformation, was broadcast on BBC4 on 15 March 2024.

== Discography ==
=== Albums ===
Studio albums

- Everybody Is Fantastic (1984) UK Indie: 6
- The Clock Comes Down the Stairs (1985) UK Indie: 1
- Crooked Mile (1987)
- 39 Minutes (1988)

Other albums

- Kaught at the Kampus (1980)
- We Hate You South African Bastards! (1984) UK Indie: 7
- The Peel Sessions Album (1989)
- Big Sleeping House (1995)
- Daunt Square to Elsewhere: 1982–1988 (2007)

=== Singles ===
- "Hello Rascals" (1982)
- "Pink Skinned Man" (1983)
- "Dolly" (1984)
- "In the World" EP (1985) UK Indie: 7
- "Birthday Girl" (1985) UK Indie: 6
- "Town to Town" (1987) Ireland: #30, UK: #55
- "Singer's Hampstead Home" (1987)
- "Gale Force Wind" (1988, UK: #98)

== Sources ==
- McDermott, Paul. "Iron Fist in Velvet Glove – the story of Microdisney". Audio documentary, Newstalk / University College Cork, 2018
