= Cathal Coughlan (musician) =

Irish songwriter and musician (1960–2022)

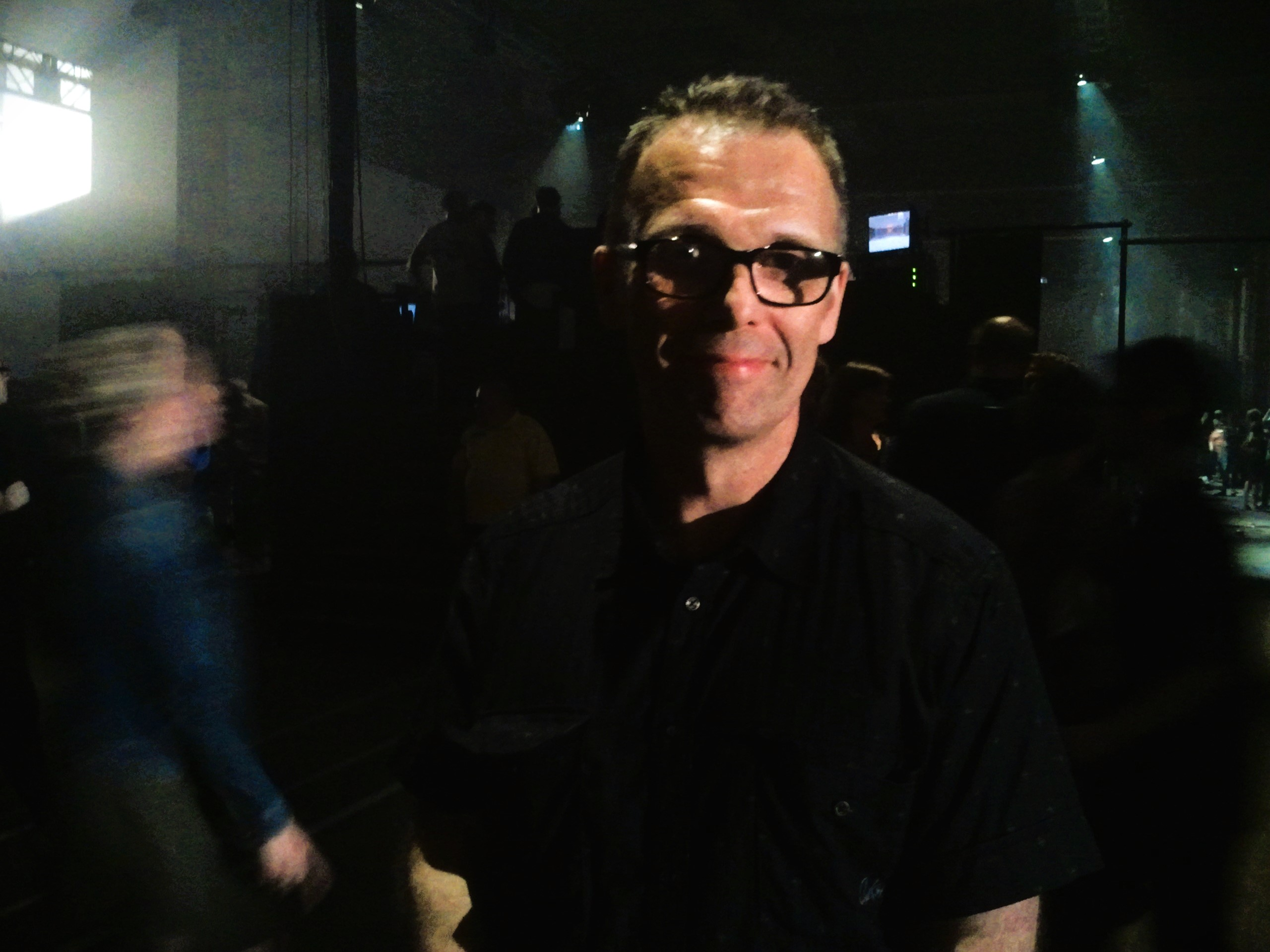
- Coughlan in 2013

Background information
- Born: 16 December 1960; Cork, Ireland
- Died: 18 May 2022 (aged 61) London, England
- Genres: Post-punk, Electronic
- Occupations: Singer, songwriter
- Instrument: Vocals
- Years active: 1980–2022
- Labels: Rough Trade Records, Virgin Records
- Formerly of: Microdisney, The Fatima Mansions, Telefís
- Website: cathalcoughlan.com

Cathal Coughlan (16 December 1960 – 18 May 2022) was an Irish singer, songwriter and musician best known for Microdisney and The Fatima Mansions. His work as a solo artist produced six albums, the final being 'Song of Co-Aklan, released in 2021 the year before his death. During the COVID-19 pandemic lockdowns he collaborated remotely with Jacknife Lee on Telefís and in 2022 they released two critically-acclaimed albums.

== Career ==
=== Microdisney ===
Raised in the village of Glounthaune, just outside of Cork city, Coughlan was active on the local Cork scene in the late 1970s, and after meeting Sean O'Hagan formed Microdisney as a duo in 1980. Following early local success, they moved to London, and recorded for the independent record label Rough Trade and later for the major label Virgin Records.

His lyrics with Microdisney focus on politics, relationships and the interplay between the two, and incorporate surreal imagery and literary and historical references. His voice on these records has been compared to Scott Walker, whom Coughlan considered a major influence. They broke up in 1988, after which O'Hagan and Coughlan formed separate bands, the High Llamas and the Fatima Mansions.

Microdisney reunited briefly in 2018 and 2019 for a limited number of shows to perform their album The Clock Comes Down the Stairs to audiences in London, Dublin and Cork. At the end of the tour they were awarded Ireland's first Trailblazer Award by IMRO/National Concert Hall, given to "culturally important" Irish albums (in this instance, for the 1985 album The Clock Comes Down the Stairs).

=== The Fatima Mansions ===
Coughlan formed the Fatima Mansions in 1988, naming the band after the large public housing complex in the working class area of Rialto in Dublin's inner city. They became known for their aggressive music and song titles, including the early tracks "Blues for Ceausescu" and "Bugs Fucking Bunny". Their 1989 debut album was Against Nature followed by Viva Dead Ponies in 1990 and the 1991 EP Bertie's Brochures and the acclaimed albums Valhalla Avenue (1992) and Lost in the Former West (1994).

Their live shows were described as "spiked with expletives and Irish gothic imagery, at their best the Mansions suggested Flann O'Brien fronting Rage Against The Machine. Listening to them was like receiving a crash course in everything that was wrong with gombeen Ireland as an industrial art-rock band thrashed their instruments in the background. The experience was at once invigorating and terribly exhausting."

Contractual issues with the record company Radioactive, effectively preventing Coughlan from performing or releasing music, eventually brought about an end to the Fatima Mansions in 1995. He later admitted that the supporting live performances were aggressive "because there was just all this business nonsense going on and I wasn't able to perform new stuff in public at all because I was in certain contractual difficulties".

=== Solo works ===
Coughlan's first solo album, Grand Necropolitan, was released in 1996 through Kitchenware Records. On that album he was still working with many of the musicians that had been involved in the Fatima Mansions. A review of the album in the NME referred to him as the 'Bard of Cork' and saying that his tales 'played a deadly serious game for laughs'. He went on to release another four albums, working mainly with a core group of musicians - Audrey Riley, James Woodrow, Nick Allum and Danny Manners - who also performed in the live shows with him as 'The Grand Necropolitan Quartet'.

His next album, Black River Falls was released in 2000. Reviewer Stuart Clark in Hotpress said that it 'confirms his position as one of Ireland's master storytellers'. This was followed in 2002 by the album The Sky's Awful Blue released on his own label, Beneath Music. In a review of a live show at London's Borderline following the release of the album the reviewer states that "the vicious romance of You Turned Me and the meditation on privilege and class that is White's Academy are intensely moral. Coughlan's intelligence and passion are a rebuke to a vapid music industry, his chronicles of disaffection and disgust an inspiration.'

Coughlan was commissioned to create a piece for the Cork 2005 European Capital of Culture. He created the song cycle performance Flannery's Mounted Head and the following year he recorded and released the music from Flannery on his solo album Foburg. During the same time, the director and filmmaker Johnny Gogan of Bandit Films, made the documentary The Adventures of Flannery and intercut film from the live performance in Cork with a imagined biography of Coughlan filmed in and around Whitechapel, London.

When reviewing the 2010 album, Rancho Tetrahedron, The Irish Times wrote that "Coughlan's mixture of acerbity and dark lyricism is sustained on his fifth solo album ....and Coughlan's Scott Walker inflected voice has never sounded better."

His final solo release, in 2021, was with the critically acclaimed album Song of Co-Aklan., where again he assembled musicians Audrey Riley, James Woodrow, Nick Allum along with others such as Luke Haines, and Aindrias O'Gruama. Filmmaker and producer George Seminara provided video for many of the album's releases.

=== Musical collaborations ===
In 1991, Coughlan was involved in a collaborative project as known as Bubonique, along with Paul Jarvis of SLAB! They brought in comedian Sean Hughes and musician Rob Allum for two further releases in 1993 and 1995. The electronic rock they produced parodied current musical trends and they often used alias in the album credits. They performed once at the Garage in London.

In 2011 a collaboration with musician Luke Haines and writer and journalist Andrew Mueller, resulted in the song and spoken word performance The North Sea Scrolls which premiered that year at the Edinburgh Fringe Festival. The studio recording of The North Sea Scrolls was released on 19 November 2012.

Coughlan contributed as a vocalist in various ensemble productions. In 2002/03 he sang and acted in the musical theatre performance Qui est Fou ? in France, and worked with François Ribac and Eva Schwabe on some of their other projects. In 2010, Coughlan recorded a duet with Dave Couse for Couse's solo album Alonewalk. As part of 2015's ensemble performance Blood and the Moon, Coughlan performed works of W.B. Yeats. In 2016 he participated in Imagining Home at the Royal Festival Hall in London, part of Ireland's Easter Rising centenary programmes. And in 2019 he was the poetry and music advisor and one of the vocalist performers in Perspectives: Change the World - Bertolt Brecht Songs and Poems. That same year he was the vocallist for the Mahler Reimagined performing with the Brian Byrne Jazz Quartet at Dublin's Sugar Club.

=== Telefís ===
Coughlan's final collaboration, as Telefís, began during the COVID lockdown with musician and producer Jacknife Lee. In 2022 the duo released the album A hAon in March and their second album, A Dó, was released after Coughlan's death in the same year. Both albums also appeared in a number of best of lists including the Irish Times' and RTÉ Entertainment's and Electronic Sound Magazine chose both albums for their 2022 best album of the year award.

== Personal life ==
In the early 1990s, Coughlan practiced abstinence from alcohol and became a vegan.

On 18 May 2022 Coughlan died aged 61 at the Royal Marsden Hospital in London. He had been receiving treatment for cancer in the previous three years. He was survived by his wife, Julie.

== Discography ==
=== Microdisney ===
- Kaught at the Kampus (compilation EP) – 1980
- We Hate You South African Bastards! – 1984
- Everybody Is Fantastic - 1984
- The Clock Comes Down the Stairs – 1985, re-issued in 2013
- Crooked Mile – 1986
- 39 Minutes – 1988

=== Fatima Mansions ===
- Against Nature – 1989
- Viva Dead Ponies – 1990
- Bertie's Brochures – (mini-album) 1991
- Valhalla Avenue – 1992
- Lost in the Former West – 1994

=== Solo ===
- Grand Necropolitan – 1996
- Black River Falls – 2000
- The Sky's Awful Blue – 2002
- Foburg – 2006
- Rancho Tetrahedron – 2010
- Song of Co-Aklan - 2021

=== Telefís ===
- a hAon – 2022
- a Dó - 2022

== General sources ==
- McDermott, Paul. "Get That Monster Off the Stage". Audio documentary, Raidió Teilifís Éireann, 2001
- McDermott, Paul. "Iron Fist in Velvet Glove — the story of Microdisney". Audio documentary, Newstalk/University College Cork, 2018
