= Finbarr Donnelly =

Singer from Northern Ireland (1962–1989)

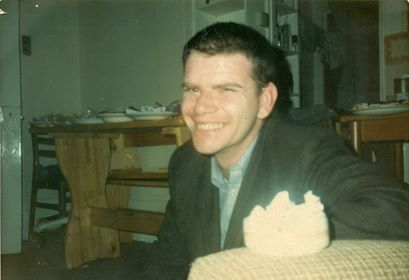
- Donnelly in the late 1980s

Background information
- Born: Finbarr Donnelly; 25 April 1962; Belfast, Northern Ireland
- Died: 18 June 1989 (aged 27) Hyde Park, London
- Genre: Post-punk
- Occupation: vocalist
- Years active: 1978–1989
- Labels: Reekus Records; Abstract Sounds; Kabuki Records; Creation Records; Setanta Records

Finbarr Donnelly (25 April 1962 – 18 June 1989) was a singer and songwriter from Belfast who moved to Cork City at a young age. He is best known as the vocalist with the post-punk band Five Go Down to the Sea? (earlier known as Nun Attax, later as Beethoven Fucking Beethoven). Known for his striking stage presence and absurdist, surreal lyrics, he and the band were hugely influential on later generations of Irish musicians. Mark McAvoy, author of Cork Rock: From Rory Gallagher to the Sultans of Ping, said in a 2017 interview that "Donnelly probably would have been the most influential musician and songwriter in...the Cork music scene and the bands that stemmed from it."

Their most widely regarded work, the EP Knot a Fish, was released in 1983. Donnelly's career peaked again in June 1989 when the EP Him Goolie Goolie Man, Dem was named "Single of the Week" by the NME. Before he could build on this success, he drowned in a swimming accident on 18 June 1989 in Hyde Park's Serpentine Pond, aged 27.

== Career ==
=== Five Go Down to the Sea? ===
Donnelly moved from Belfast to The Glen area of Cork City as a child, when his family sought to relocate to avoid The Troubles in Northern Ireland. He met guitarist Ricky Dineen in 1978, and having bonded over a shared interest in UFOs, they formed a band, initially known as Nun Attax that year. The band grew a live following in Cork, centered around gigs in the Arcadia ballroom. Following the recruitment of various second guitarists and the cellist Úna Ní Chanainn, they recorded their most acclaimed EP Knot a Fish in 1983, and moved to London later that year. In 1984 they recorded The Glee Club on Abstract Sounds.

In 1985, they met Alan McGee and producer Joe Foster of Creation Records, a label which the band admired. McGee asked them to play a number of gigs at his Living Room club night on Conway Street, Camden. He remembered; "They were bananas. They would bite Joe's head, Donnelly would lick my ears. But they were good to have in the club if there was ever any threat of violence." According to writer David Cavanagh, during band's gigs at the Living Room, "Donnelly...snatched pints from the hands of people in the crowd, and shouted surreal, Flann O'Brien-esque lyrics while his colleagues clonked out ramshackle, all-elbows rhythms."

The Singing in Braille EP was released on Creation in August 1985, but sold only 600 copies. Cavanagh believes that a long-term relationship with Creation was never likely, and that doing business with them would have been extremely difficult. The label's art director Peter Fowler remembers visiting them in Rotherhithe where he said "they were living with ten builders...They invited us around for tea, and they brought out a tray of jelly babies. Then they turned on the TV and sat down. [We] thought 'this is a joke – the hamburgers will be coming out any minute.' But they just sat there with a knife and fork and ate jelly babies. I've spoken since to people who've said "No they weren't doing it for show. That's what they did."

=== Beethoven Fucking Beethoven ===
After the band broke up in 1985, Donnelly and Dineen stayed in London and played a number of gigs with a drum machine early in 1986, but did not attract industry interest. The two reformed as Beethoven in 1988, and the following year released the Him Goolie Goolie Man, Dem EP on Setanta Records. The record was awarded "Single of the Week" by Steven Wells in the NME, who wrote that "The centre-stone of this jewel of a record is the kidnapping, tarring and feathering, mugging, shagging and destruction of "Day Tripper." Setanta founder Keith Cullen later said that while he admired the band, by then "it was all about drinking really. Donnelly and Ricky were always drunk. It was a laugh basically. I think that's the best way to put it."

== Death ==
Before the band could build on their successful EP, on 18 June 1989, Donnelly accidentally drowned while swimming in Hyde Park's Serpentine Pond, aged 27. Dineen had been out with him that day, and they had planned to meet up at a pub later in the evening. Dineen was there with his girlfriend, along with another of their female friends. He said "It was just an accident. It was one of those boiling hot days that you get in London in the summer. We were in Hyde Park and it was a natural thing for Donnelly to take off his clothes down to his jocks and go for a swim. He took off and the lifeguard people came out on a boat and tried to get him out. Mischievous person that Finbarr was, he tried to go under the boat, and he didn't come up. I think he got caught in the undergrowth underneath the water. We were sitting down having a few cans or whatever it was at the time, with girlfriends, shooting the breeze."

Dineen later said, "If you went out for the craic with your friends on a Sunday afternoon and one of them didn't come back, it's surreal like. Even though we were both 27, you're still young. It changes your whole life because we went from planning our future, thinking we were going to be in England for a while, to the next minute being on the flight back to Ireland." The planned second single was never released.

== Personality ==
Donnelly had an over-sized personality, and he was described as a magnetic and charismatic if somewhat menacing performer. Keith O'Connell said that he "was fine during rehearsals, but he used to go off on his own then, especially in London ... We wouldn't know what he was getting up to. He was a big bloke, so he was intimidating. People used to be afraid of him." According to Dineen "As a performer, he was just totally crazy; you never knew what he was going to do. He could fit the whole microphone into his mouth. Sometimes the gigs would totally break down and be chaotic and he'd be too drunk. He'd still put on a great performance, but he'd miss all the cues and we'd want to kill him and we'd nearly end up fighting on the stage."

Remarking on Donnelly's eccentric stage persona, Membranes vocalist and writer John Robb said "Over the years I’ve heard all manner of tedious bastard bands yapping on about how they broke all the rules and how wild they were – perhaps they never saw Five Go Down to the Sea?" Cathal Coughlan, songwriter and vocalist for Microdisney and the Fatima Mansions, said that he would "not have ended up doing music if I hadn't met Donnelly, and ... ended up as a malcontented alcoholic civil servant working in a food factory somewhere in County Offaly."

In 2020, The Quietus critic Eoin Murray wrote that "listening ... now, almost 40 years later, it's with a mixture of nausea and awe that we hear so much of young Ireland's modern experience in Donnelly's words – in his frustration and frantic determination." In an oral history that served as a companion to the audio documentary Get That Monster Off the Stage, some close associates revealed that Donnelly was gay.

== Cultural legacy ==
The English songwriter Pete Astor's 1992 song "Donnelly" was written in tribute to the late singer. The track appears on their album Paradise, released on Danceteria records. Astor said in 2016; "the reason I wrote the song is that I have an incredibly strong memory of Donnelly and the band. The song had to do with the idea that Donnelly was the unsung hero. He was like a complete hero, a total legend, just like Shaun Ryder was and is, and years later just like Richie Edwards was and is. But Finbarr was unsung."

In 2001, radio documentary producer and broadcaster Paul McDermott released "Get That Monster Off the Stage", a radio documentary about Finbarr Donnelly and his bands. First broadcast on Cork Campus Radio 98.3FM, it has since been revised to include contributions from Ricky Dineen and additional music. To mark the 20th anniversary of Donnelly's death, a tribute night was held at the Pavilion in Cork on 18 June 2009. Featuring covers of their songs, the line up included Mick Lynch and John Spillane.

The band Your Heterosexual Violence released the song "Curtains Closed (Eulogy for Finbarr Donnelly)" in June 2019. According to vocalist Brian O'Brien: "Most of the band knew Finbarr from when he and his band Five Go Down To The Sea? were living in [London]. I became particularly good friends with [him] and since his untimely passing...rarely does a day go by without my thinking about him. He was a real one-off, with a unique way of engaging with people, a unique way of looking at the world and his bands sounded like no other."

The Five Go Down to the Sea? compilation album Hiding from the Landlord was released in April 2020, accompanied by a twenty-page fanzine with contributions from Astor, Reekus Records founder Elvira Butler, Cathal Coughlan of The Fatima Mansions, Gavin Friday of the Virgin Prunes, and writers John Robb, Kevin Barry, Declan Lynch and Cónal Creedon.

== Discography ==
Nun Attax

- Kaught at the Kampus, various artists recorded at the Arcadia ballroom on 30 August 1980, Reekus Records, released 1981. Re-issued 2015
- Dave Fanning Radio Session, RTÉ2, 9 February 1981. Five tracks (Note: The five tracks are "The Woodcutter Song", "Looking for Words For My Book", "Alynut", "Phantom Gobi", "Eidelweiss")

Five Go Down to the Sea?

- Knot a Fish, Kabuki Records, 1983. EP
- 1st Fanning Session, RTÉ, 18 October November 1983. Five tracks (Note: The five tracks are "Big Brown Ceann", "These Boots Were Made", "Wild my Cigar Meryl Streeps", "Lorry Across the Lee", "Blue Moon Song")
- The Glee Club, Abstract Sounds, 1984. EP
- 2nd Fanning Session, RTÉ2, 20 November 1984. Three tracks (Note: The three tracks are "Are You A Horse", "Unga Bungasong", "Tell Elvis I love Her")
- Singing in Braille, Creation Records, August 1985, EP
- Hiding from the Landlord, AllCity Records, 2020. Compilation album

Beethoven

- Him Goolie Goolie Man, Dem, Setanta Records, June 1989. EP
