= Hiding from the Landlord =

Compilation album by Five Go Down to the Sea?
- Released: 2020
- Recorded: 1980–1989
- Studio: Various
- Genre: Post-punk
- Label: AllCity Records

Five Go Down to the Sea? chronology
Him Goolie Goolie Man, Dem (1989)	Hiding from the Landlord (2020)

Hiding from the Landlord is a twenty-four track compilation album by the Irish post-punk band Five Go Down to the Sea?. It was released in April 2020 on vinyl and CD by Allchival records, an imprint of AllCity Records.

The album was accompanied by a twenty-page fanzine with contributions from Elvira Butler, Cathal Coughlan of Microdisney, Pete Astor of The Weather Prophets, Gavin Friday of the Virgin Prunes, and writers John Robb, Kevin Barry, Declan Lynch and Cónal Creedon. The track listing was compiled by the musician John Byrne and the documentary producer Paul McDermott, who also edited the fanzine. The release contains the first official release of "Knocknaheeny Shuffle", which was recorded live during the Knot A Fish sessions, but had only survived on cassette copies. (Note: The Mick and Elaine who "watch tv in the privacy of their home" in the opening line of "Knocknaheeny Shuffle" refers to old friends of the band)

== Track listing ==
All songs recorded as Five Go Down to the Sea? unless otherwise indicated.

1. There's A Fish On Top Of Shandon (Swears He's Elvis) – 02:43
2. The Woodcutter Song – 02:36 (as Nun Attax)
3. Lorry Across the Lee – 02:14
4. Fishes For Compliments – 03:40
5. What Happened Your Leg? – 02:12
6. Day Tripper – 02:54 (as Beethoven)
7. Blue Moon – 03:48
8. Knocknaheeny Shuffle – 02:45
9. Wince – 02:58 (as Beethoven)
10. While My Cigar Gently Streeps – 00:47
11. Alyunt – 03:06 (as Nun Attax)
12. Why Wait Until April
13. The Glee Club – 02:49
14. Reekus Sunfare – 04:36 (as Nun Attax)
15. Jumping Joley – 02:36
16. Edelweiss – 01:56 (as Nun Attax)
17. Often – 02:39
18. Aunt Nelly – 03:25
19. White Cortina – 02:58 (as Nun Attax)
20. Channel Blocks – 02:33 (as Beethoven)
21. Are You A Horse? – 03:04
22. Boon For Travellists – 02:41
23. Elephants For Fun And Profit – 02:20
24. Another Spark – 02:22

== Personnel ==
- Finbarr Donnelly – lead vocals, lyrics (1978–1989)
- Ricky Dineen – guitar, bass (1978–1989)
- Philip O'Connell – bass (1978–1985)
- Keith O'Connell – drums (1978–1985)
- Mick Finnegan – guitar (1979)
- Giordaí Ua Laoghaire – guitar (1979-1980)
- Mick Stack – guitar (1982-1985)
- Úna Ní Chanainn – cello (1982-1983)
- Daniel Strittmatter – drums (1985-1989)
- Maurice Carter – bass (1988-1989)

== Footnotes ==
=== Sources ===
- McDermott, Paul; Byrne, John (2020), Hiding From The Landlord (sleeve notes), Dublin: AllCity Records.
