= Ricky Dineen =

Irish musician

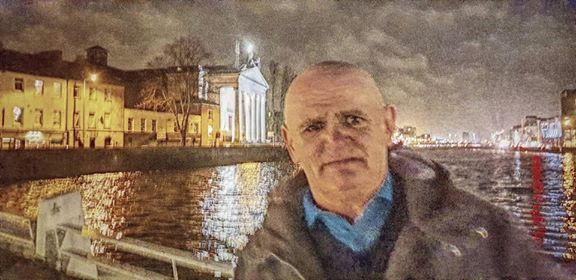
- Ricky Dineen in 2019

Background information
- Born: Ricky Dineen; 2 April 1962 (age 63); Churchfield, Cork City, Ireland
- Genres: Post-punk
- Occupations: Songwriter, guitarist
- Years active: 1978–present
- Labels: Reekus Records; Abstract Sounds; Kabuki Records; Creation Records; Setanta Records

Ricky Dineen (born 2 April 1962) is an Irish musician best known as the guitarist with the post-punk band Five Go Down to the Sea?. He wrote most of the band's music and developed their angular musical style, which he said was in part influenced by contemporary post-punk bands such as The Fire Engines, Gang of Four, The Mekons and Bogshed.

Five Go Down To The Sea? were active between 1978 and 1985 and released three EPs; Knot a Fish (1983), The Glee Club (1984) and Singing in Braille (1985). His career highlight came in June 1989 when he formed "Beethoven Fucking Beethoven" with FGDTS vocalist Finbarr Donnelly. Their EP Him Goolie Goolie Man, Dem was chosen as "Single of the Week" by the NME on 3 June 1989, however this late success was cut short two weeks later when Donnelly accidentally drowned at The Serpentine lake in London. Distraught, Dineen returned to his home town of Cork, where he still lives.

Five Go Down to the Sea? have been hugely influential on successive generations of Irish bands such as The Sultans of Ping FC, and are widely credited for the often quirky and deadpan approach of the 1990s and 2000s Cork scene. Since the mid-2010s, Dineen writes for and plays guitar with the self-described "post-punk geriatric" group Big Boy Foolish. A keen music fan, as of 2021 his current influences included The Ex, Squid, Idles and Girl Band. In January 2024, Big Boy Foolish released their debut album "Stall the Ball".

== Career ==
=== Nun Attax / Five Go Down to the Sea? ===
Dineen grew up in Churchfield on the northside of Cork City, and formed his first band in 1978 with school friends Philip and Keith O’Connell. He met vocalist Finbarr Donnelly in 1978 when they bonded over a shared interest in UFOs and music. Until then Dineen had been a hard rock and Pink Floyd fan; Donnelly introduced him to post-punk and other groups he had heard on John Peel's BBC radio show. Nun Attax developed an early live following in Cork and in the late 1970s became scene leaders in the local punk movement that grew around the Arcadia ballroom, managed by Elvera Butler and Andy Foster. Their local breakthrough came in 1981 when three of their songs were included on the Reekus Records live compilation album Kaught at the Kampus, alongside tracks by Microdisney, Mean Features and Urban Blitz.

In 1983 they renamed as Five Go Down to the Sea? and recruited Úna Ní Chanainn on cello to play the bass parts. The addition of a cellist lead to a significant change the band's music, away from their punk roots towards a more Captain Beefheart and surreal sound. They recorded their most acclaimed EP Knot a Fish later that year, which was described in 2001 by Cathal Coughlan of Microdisney and The Fatima Mansions as "just incredible...completely different to Nun Attax...it wasn't like a rock band anymore, it was...bizarre but coherent. Nothing when on for longer than two and a half minutes...[it was] a completely focused attack of extreme Cork eccentricity." The band moved to London that winter, where they built a live following across England, with most of their fan base centered in the north. They released two further EPs, The Glee Club (Abstract Sounds, 1984) and Singing in Braille (Creation, 1984). Dineen was unhappy with the Creation recording and said in 2014 that while he liked the Foster, the band was trying to do something that they weren't suited to and that they "were trying to be over the top a bit...and it was a disappointment". The band went into hiatus in 1985, although Dineen and Donnelly stayed in London and played a number of gigs accompanied by a drum machine early in 1986, but without attracting industry interest.

=== Beethoven Fucking Beethoven ===
Donnelly and Dinned reformed as Beethoven (at first known as "Beethoven Fucking Beethoven") in 1988 and released the Him Goolie Goolie Man, Dem EP on Setanta Records the following year. In his review for the NME, writer Steven Wells awarded the record “Single of the Week”, and said that "The centrestone of this jewel of a record is the kidnapping, tarring and feathering, mugging, shagging and destruction of "Day Tripper". Before they could build on this success, Donnelly accidentally drowned 18 June 1989 while swimming in Hyde Park's Serpentine Pond, aged 27. Dineen had been out with him that day, and they had planned to meet up later in the evening. He later said, "If you went out for the craic with your friends on a Sunday afternoon and one of them didn't come back, it's surreal-like. Even though we were both 27, you're still young. It changes your whole life because we went from planning our future, thinking we were going to be in England for a while, to the next minute being on the flight back to Ireland."

The planned second single was never released. Grief stricken and with the band at a sudden end, Dineen returned to Cork shortly afterwards, where he "drank [his] way though the 1990s", until his career revived in the early 2000s.

=== Big Boy Foolish ===
Dineen still live in Cork City. He is currently the music writer and guitarist with Big Boy Foolish, a duo formed with vocalist Liam Heffernan, formerly of Mean Features. Given their early 1980s vintage, the band self-describe as "Post punk Geriatrics". Because Dineen lives in Cork and Heffernan in Dublin, they collaborate remotely by sending each other ideas and riffs that "gradually [evolve into] tunes". According to Heffernan the process began "long before the pandemic made a necessity of distributed teamwork." They released their debut single "Horsey!" in In June 2020 described by McGrath-Bryan in The Evening Echo as continuing Dineen's sound "along a grinning, black-humored trajectory".

In 2021 McGrath-Bryan wrote that they had "spent the last number of years cultivating a body of idiosyncratic, drum machine-propelled tunes that sit somewhere to the left of the current wave of genre revivalism." Their second single, "Up the Airy", was released in August 2020, followed by "B-B-F" that December. Their single "Nunzerkat", which Dinnen said was the ‘fourth in a trilogy", was released in January 2021 and topped the iTunes Music Store's Irish rock category. Their November 2021 single "Bothán" was described as falling "somewhere between their post-punk roots and a mad, spacey take on low, loping country-ish lead guitar." The dance influenced track "Sycophant's Dance" was released in late 2022. Their debut album "Stall the Ball" was released in early 2024.

The band released their debut album "Stall the Ball" in January 2024, digitally and on vinyl. It was followed by a number of singles and the January 2025 EP "Fear & Foibles".

=== Churchfield Boys ===
Dineen and ‘Smelly’ O Connell reunited in 2026 as the "Churchfield Boys" to record the one-off song "A little bit awful". The track was described by the critic Gedas Babey as "brilliant" and a "dispassionate, desperate narrative yet a song full of compassion. Hot Press likened it to ... Dry Cleaning but to me it’s more Poison Girls and Siouxsie."

== Legacy ==
Over the years, Five Go Down to the Sea? have steadily grown in popularity. According to Morty McCarthy of The Sultans Of Ping, they are "the sacred cow" of Cork music and have become "an almost the untouchable band. Every band whose heard of them looks up to [them]." In 2001 Paul McDermott released "Get That Monster off the Stage", a radio documentary about the band. The well received compilation album Hiding from the Landlord was released in April 2020, accompanied by a twenty-page fanzine with contributions from Elvira Butler, Cathal Coughlan of Microdisney, Pete Astor of The Weather Prophets, Gavin Friday of the Virgin Prunes, and writers John Robb, Kevin Barry, Declan Lynch and Cónal Creedon.

Dineen lead the occasional FGDTTS memorial band And NUN Came Back along with vocalist Tom Healy, bassist Humphrey Murphy and drummer Ian Walsh. A planned reunion for early 2020 was canceled due to covid restrictions.

Five Go Down To The Sea? were commemorated by Cork City Libraries and Cork City Council in August 2020 with a mural on Grand Parade to mark the 40th anniversary of the recording of "Kaught at the Kampus". The two-panel installation consisted of a full size photograph shown next to a reprint of a contemporary fanzine interview. Writing for the Irish Examiner, McGrath-Bryan said that the mural recognises a "record that has come to be regarded as a document of the Cork music scene at an important juncture, helping to set the tone for the city's subsequent musical reputation, with many of the musicians and personalities involved becoming cult figures in their own right."

== Discography ==
Nun Attax

- Kaught at the Kampus, various artists recorded at the Arcadia ballroom on 30 August 1980, Reekus Records, released 1981. Re-issued in 2015 and 2020
- Dave Fanning Radio Session, RTÉ2, 9 February 1981. Five tracks (Note: The tracks are "The Woodcutter Song", "Looking for Words For My Book", "Alynut", "Phantom Gobi", "Eidelweiss")

Five Go Down to the Sea?

- Knot a Fish, Kabuki Records, 1983. EP
- 1st Fanning Session, RTÉ, winter 1983. Five tracks (Note: The tracks are "Big Brown Ceann", "These Boots Were Made", "Wild my Cigar Meryl Streeps", "Lorry Across the Lee", "Blue Moon Song")
- The Glee Club, Abstract Sounds, 1984. EP
- 2nd Fanning Session, RTÉ2, 20 November 1984. Three tracks (Note: The three tracks are "Are You A Horse", "Unga Bungasong", "Tell Elvis I love Her")
- Singing in Braille, Creation Records, August 1985, EP
- Hiding from the Landlord, AllCity Records, 2020. Compilation album

Beethoven Fucking Beethoven

- Him Goolie Goolie Man, Dem, Setanta Records, June 1989. EP

Big Boy Foolish

Singles

- "Horsey!", June 2020
- "Up The Airy", August 2020
- "B-B-F", December 2020
- "Nunzerkat", January 2021
- "Bothán", November 2021
- "Sycophant's Dance", early 2022
- "Oktobar", September 2022
- "Penumbra", December 2022

EPs

- ""Fear & Foibles" January 2025

Albums:

- "Stall the Ball", January 2024

Churchfield Boys

- "A little bit awful" - single, July 2026
