= Five Go Down to the Sea? =

Irish band

- Ricky Dineen and Finbarr Donnelly in the late 1970s

Background information
- Origin: Cork, Ireland
- Genre: Post-punk
- Years active: 1978–1989
- Labels: Reekus Records; Abstract Sounds; Kabuki Records; Creation Records; Setanta Records
- Past members: Finbarr Donnelly; Ricky Dineen; Mick Finnegan; Philip O'Connell; Keith O'Connell; Giordaí Ua Laoghaire; Mick Stack; Úna Ní Chanainn; Daniel Strittmatter; Maurice Carter
- Website: nunfivebeethoven

Five Go Down to the Sea? were an Irish post-punk band from Cork, active between 1978 and 1989. Vocalist and lyricist Finbarr Donnelly, guitarist Ricky Dineen and brothers Philip (bass) and Keith "Smelly" O'Connell (drums) formed the band as Nun Attax while teenagers. They became known for Donnelly's absurdist, surreal lyrics and stage presence, Dineen's angular guitar and their Captain Beefheart-style rhythm section. The group changed their name to Five Go Down to the Sea? after moving to London in 1983. Their line-up has at times included guitarists Mick Finnegan, Giordaí Ua Laoghaire, Mick Stack, and the cellist Úna Ní Chanainn.

Dineen was influenced by bands such as the Mekons and the Fire Engines and wrote most of the riffs. After achieving a following in Ireland in the early 1980s, they changed their name in 1983 and recorded the Knot a Fish EP. Five Go Down to the Sea? moved to London later that year, where they developed a live following. Although they never secured a recording contract for an album, they released further EPs. They found no commercial success or manager; in 1985, disillusioned with the music scene, they split up. Donnelly and Dineen re-formed in 1988 as Beethoven, and released the EP Him Goolie Goolie Man, Dem the following year. Their re-formation was short-lived, as Donnelly drowned accidentally on 18 June 1989, aged 27.

Although Five Go Down to the Sea? only released four EPs and did not sell many records, their reputation has grown over time. They influenced later generations of Irish musicians, especially a number of later dryly humorous Cork bands. In 2001, broadcaster Paul McDermott produced Get That Monster Off the Stage, a radio documentary about Finbarr Donnelly and his bands. In a 2017 interview, writer Mark McAvoy acknowledged that Donnelly "probably would have been the most influential musician and songwriter in terms of the Cork music scene and the bands that stemmed from it." A compilation album Hiding from the Landlord was released in 2020.

== History ==
=== Cork ===
The band was formed by childhood friends Ricky Dineen and brothers Philip and Keith O'Connell, who grew up in Churchfield, Gurranabraher, on Cork city's north side. Dineen met Finbarr Donnelly in 1978, and introduced him to the other members of the fledgling group. Donnelly had moved from Belfast to The Glen, Cork, aged 12, yet spoke with a heavy Cork accent. (Note: According to Dineen, the other members of the Donnelly family retained their Belfast accents, but Finbarr sought to "out-Cork Cork".) Dineen had been a fan of hard rock and Pink Floyd until Donnelly introduced him to post-punk and John Peel's BBC radio show. Donnelly named the band Nun Attax, and they began playing covers of punk rock songs such as "Teenage Kicks", "Pretty Vacant" and tracks by the Damned in Keith O'Connell's bedroom. According to Philip O'Connell, "The punk thing was about doing your own thing and not following what went before, not doing the 12-bar blues that everybody else seemed to be doing ... Loads of people around us were into Status Quo, but we thought they were a bunch of muppets."

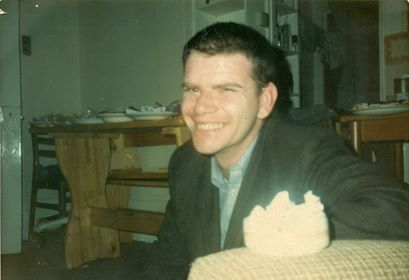
Finbarr Donnelly in the late 1980s

While other emerging Cork bands centred on University College Cork, the members of Nun Attax mostly came from the working-class north side, having attended what they sardonically termed "University College Churchfield". They developed a following among Cork's students and residents of the middle-class south-side suburbs. According to Dineen, their fans "were from college and everything like that. We were actually ... working-class snobs ... we thought we were above all them kind of people ... and they were trying to be like us. [But] they were all probably being collected by their daddies at the end of the night." Most of the early Nun Attax material was written in Ballinora, Cork; according to Sean O'Hagan of fellow Cork band Microdisney, they rehearsed in a Gaelic Athletic Association hall in the countryside, and people would "pile into a bus" to go and watch them rehearse.

Nun Attax played their first gig in February 1979 at Mayfield community school. They soon became leaders in a punk movement that grew around the Arcadia ballroom, next to Kent station. Also known as the Arch or the Downtown Kampus, the Arcadia was one of the few Irish venues that favoured punk over blues bands, and was managed by Elvera Butler and Andy Foster. (Note: Managed by Elvera Butler and Andy Foster, the Arcadia closed in the aftermath of the 1981 Stardust fire, in part due to increased insurance costs. In addition, Butler said, "The hunger strikes in the north were also happening and all the visiting bands were cancelling Belfast. It became less viable for them to come over".) Soon after, Nun Attax began playing at Sir Henry's on South Main Street, Cork. They later began to perform nationwide, including gigs in Dublin and Dundalk.

Mostly under Dineen's guidance, who was influenced by bands such as the Mekons and the Fire Engines, Gang of Four and Siouxsie and the Banshees, the band formed a densely structured and noisy sound that developed from their punk influences. Typically, Dineen would bring a riff that the band would jam on, before Donnelly added vocals. Donnelly was the sole lyricist, and developed a capacity for spontaneous, vernacular and surreal lyrics. Although the band members were self-taught musicians, Dineen was an inventive guitarist, while Keith O'Connell's drumming added a Captain Beefheart influence.

Mick Finnegan joined in early in 1979 as a second guitarist, but left after a few months. He was replaced that September by Giordaí Ua Laoghaire, originally from Ovens, County Cork. According to Dineen, Ua Laoghaire was a more accomplished musician and took the band forward in their sound; Dineen has said that until then, the band had been "playing to their abilities". Ua Laoghaire was hired in part because Dineen, who wanted to improve the band's musicianship, had seen him attend an XTC concert at the Arcadia, and noticed that he did not dress like a typical punk fan. Ua Laoghaire recalled of his first rehearsal with the band, "Nun Attax walked in and there was Donnelly. I'd been avoiding him around town for ages because I was afraid of him." Ua Laoghaire left in May 1980 to join Microdisney. In 1981 three of Nun Attax's songs were featured on the live compilation album Kaught at the Kampus, alongside tracks by Mean Features, Urban Blitz and Microdisney. The album was recorded at the Arcadia on 30 August 1980, and released by Reekus Records. Philip O'Connell left in 1980; after which Dineen temporarily played bass on recordings.

They hired guitarist Mick Stack in 1982 and renamed as Five Go Down to the Sea? They made radical changes to their sound, recruiting cellist Úna Ní Chanainn, from Glanmire and later of the RTÉ National Symphony Orchestra, who took over the bass parts from Dinnen. They recorded the 1983 EP Knot a Fish released on Garreth Ryan's London-Irish label Kabuki, best known for the tracks "Elephants For Fun And Profit" and "There's a fish on top of Shandon (swears he's Elvis)". Ní Chanainn was with the band for around a year, but stayed in Cork when the group moved to England, becoming again a four-piece.

=== London ===
Five Go Down To The Sea? moved to Rotherhithe, London, in 1983. This was in part due to the lack of job prospects resulting from the economic recession that hit Cork in the early 1980s, which lead to high levels of emigration from the city. Their first year was difficult. They lived on the breadline, staying in squats and working as manual labourers. They signed a record contract with Abstract Sounds in 1984 and released the Glee Club EP, produced by Jon Langford and described by McDermott as "an incredibly powerful record that captures the band at the height of its powers". Langford later said of the recordings that "they were hugely entertaining. I thought they were smart and really clever, they all had an amazing wit. A razor sharp, surreal fucking wit. It was like being within someone else's world, they were their own family." Abstract arranged a series of gigs, including a night where the Jesus and Mary Chain played support. The tour helped them develop a cult following, especially in the North of England.

Photograph of the life-size Five Go Down To The Sea? mural placed on Cork's Grand Parade in August 2020. Left to right: Finbarr Donnelly, Keith O'Connell, Ricky Dineen, Philip O'Connell.

In 1985, they met Alan McGee and producer Joe Foster of Creation Records, a label which the band admired. McGee asked them to play a number of gigs at his Living Room club night on Conway Street, Camden. He remembered; "They were bananas. They would bite Joe's head, Donnelly would lick my ears. But they were good to have in the club if there was ever any threat of violence." According to writer David Cavanagh, during band's gigs at the Living Room, "Donnelly...snatched pints from the hands of people in the crowd, and shouted surreal, Flann O'Brien-esque lyrics while his colleagues clonked out ramshackle, all-elbows rhythms."

The EP Singing in Braille was released on Creation in August 1985, but sold only 600 copies. Cavanagh believes that a long term relationship with Creation was never likely, and that doing business with them would have been extremely difficult. The label's art director Peter Fowler remembers visiting them in Rotherhithe where he said "they were living with ten builders...They invited us around for tea, and they brought out a tray of jelly babies. Then they turned the TV and sat down. [We] thought 'this is a joke – the hamburgers will be coming out any minute.' But they just sat there with a knife and fork and ate jelly babies. I've spoken since to people who've said "No they weren't doing it for show. That's what they did." Nevertheless, Dineen was unhappy with the Creation recording and said in 2014 that while he liked Foster, the band was trying to do something that they weren't suited to and "were trying to be over the top a bit...and it was a disappointment".

The band members often had difficulty interacting with English record labels. Dineen recalled that they found it hard to compromise artistically and "couldn't talk to these people, in the way they wanted us to talk to them, because it wasn't in our way. These record people, they wanted a certain way ... and I couldn't, definitely Donnelly couldn't." Ua Laoghaire suggests that Donnelly may have secretly wanted success, but was unwilling to let other people know. Coughlan believes that they were primed for success and could have been as commercially successful as Echo & the Bunnymen, but were too hesitant to talk to people they did not know, including A&R contacts. He described them as a "bit of a closed shop", which hindered their dealings with record companies. Journalist Fergal Keane agrees, and suggests they would have been more successful with a manager who Donnelly would listen to and who would take care of their business needs. Keane, however, reflects that Donnelly was drinking heavily at the time and "wasn't going to listen to anyone".

The band split up at the end of 1985. They were frustrated that they had not secured a longer record contract, disillusioned with the live circuit, and tired of living in poverty. Stack had tired of the constant heavy drinking, and wanted to move to America, while Keith O'Connell disliked life on the road and wanted to move back to Ireland. Donnelly and Dineen played a number of gigs with a drum machine early in 1986, but did not attract industry interest.

=== Beethoven ===
Donnelly and Dineen remained in London after the split. Early in 1988 they recruited Dublin-born bassist Maurice Carter and Swiss drummer Daniel Strittmatter and reformed under the name Beethoven Fucking Beethoven, later abbreviated as simply Beethoven. After a debut gig at the Mean Fiddler, the band came to the attention of Keith Cullen, owner of Setanta Records, and for a period he acted as their manager and booked their gigs. The band released an EP, Him Goolie Goolie Man, Dem, in early June 1989, produced by Jon Langford of the Mekons and the Three Johns. It was Setanta's first release, and contained five tracks, including a cover of "Day Tripper" by the Beatles.

The EP was the NME's "Single of the Week" in their 3 June 1989 edition. In his review, NME writer Steven Wells called it a "jewel of a record" and wrote that "the centre-stone....is the kidnapping, tarring and feathering, mugging, shagging and destruction of "Day Tripper"." Melody Maker journalist David Stubbs gave a less favourable review, describing Donnelly's vocals as "a wail of 'WHOOOAAAS', like brickies on a roller coaster". Ua Laoghaire found that the new songs lacked the outward humour of Five Go Down To The Sea?, reflecting the bitterness of Donnelly and Dineen's experience with the music industry, but felt they had retained their edge. Cullen later said that while he liked the band, by then "it was all about drinking really. Donnelly and Ricky were always drunk. It was a laugh basically. I think that's the best way to put it."

A few weeks later, on 18 June 1989, Donnelly drowned while swimming in Hyde Park's Serpentine Pond, aged 27. Dineen was there with two other friends. He said "It was just an accident. It was one of those boiling hot days that you get in London...and it was a natural thing for Donnelly to take of his clothes down to his jocks and go for a swim. He took off and the lifeguard people came out on a boat and tried to get him out. Mischievous person that Finbarr was, he tried to go under the boat, and he didn't come up. I think he got caught in the undergrowth underneath the water."

Dineen had been drinking with him earlier that day, and they had planned to meet at a pub later in the evening. He was deeply affected by his friend's death, and later said: "If you went out for the craic with your friends on a Sunday afternoon and one of them didn't come back, it's surreal-like. Even though we were both 27, you're still young. It changes your whole life because we went from planning our future, thinking we were going to be in England for a while, to the next minute being on the flight back to Ireland." A second EP, planned to feature a cover of Queen's "Bohemian Rhapsody", was never recorded. Grief-stricken and with his career at a sudden end, Dineen returned to Cork, where he said he "drank [his] way through the 90s".

== Legacy and influence ==
Donnelly has been described as charismatic and having a magnetic personality, but was sometimes intimidating in person. Membranes vocalist John Robb said of Donnelly's eccentric stage persona: "Over the years I've heard all manner of tedious bastard bands yapping on about how they broke all the rules and how wild they were – perhaps they never saw Five Go Down to the Sea?". According to Keith O'Connell, Donnelly "was fine during rehearsals, but he used to go off on his own then, especially in London ... We wouldn't know what he was getting up to. He was a big bloke ... people used to be afraid of him." Cathal Coughlan, songwriter and vocalist for Microdisney and the Fatima Mansions, said that he would "not have ended up doing music if I hadn't met Donnelly, and ... would have ended up as a malcontented alcoholic civil servant working in a food factory somewhere in County Offaly". In 2020, Quietus critic Eoin Murray wrote that "listening ... now, almost 40 years later, it's with a mixture of nausea and awe that we hear so much of young Ireland's modern experience in Donnelly's words – in his frustration and frantic determination".

Five Go Down to the Sea?, and Donnelly in particular, are credited for influencing the dry humour of Cork bands in later decades. According to critic Des O'Driscoll, Donnelly "helped unleash the quirky originality that became a feature of the Cork music scene". Mick Lynch of Stump agreed, saying that "he gave the rest of us permission to be loopy". Morty McCarthy of The Sultans Of Ping also agreed, saying in 2020 that the band are "the sacred cow of Cork music; they're almost the untouchable band. Every band whose heard of them looks up to [them]." In 2020, Sally Timms of the Mekons said the band were "so funny and so talented and strange", and that Donnelly was the "funniest, most talented and strangest of them all".

The English songwriter Pete Astor wrote the song "Donnelly" in memory of the singer. It appears on his album Paradise, released on Danceteria records. Astor said in 2016 that he wrote the song because he had "an incredibly strong memory of Donnelly and the band. The song had to do with the idea that Donnelly was the unsung hero. He was like a complete hero, a total legend, just like Shaun Ryder was and is, and years later just like Richie Edwards was and is. But Finbarr was unsung."

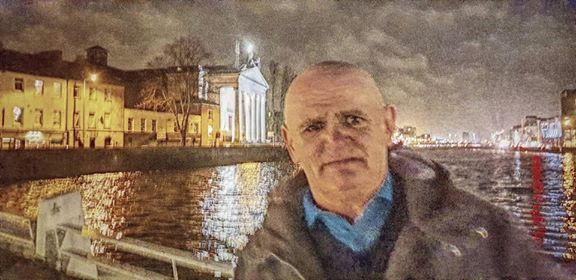
Ricky Dineen by Cork City Hall in 2019

In 2001, radio documentary producer and broadcaster Paul McDermott with the assistance of Kieran Hurley and Conor O'Toole produced "Get That Monster off the Stage", a radio documentary about Finbarr Donnelly and his bands. First broadcast on Cork Campus Radio 98.3FM, it has since been revised to include additional contributions and music, and broadcast on RTÉ. To mark the 20th anniversary of Donnelly's death, a tribute night was held at the Pavilion in Cork on 18 June 2009. Featuring covers of their songs, the lineup included Mick Lynch and John Spillane. As of 2020, Dineen is the guitarist and co-songwriter in Big Boy Foolish.

A 24-track compilation album, Hiding from the Landlord, was released in April 2020 on Allchival Records, an imprint of AllCity Records. It contains the first official release of "Knocknaheeny Shuffle", which was recorded live during the Knot a Fish sessions, but had only survived on cassette copies. The album was accompanied by a 20-page fanzine with contributions from musicians including Cathal Coughlan, Pete Astor, John Robb, and Virgin Prunes singer Gavin Friday, and writers Kevin Barry, Declan Lynch and Cónal Creedon.

Five Go Down to the Sea? were commemorated in August 2020 by a mural on Cork's Grand Parade. The installation was a collaboration between Cork City Libraries and Cork City Council to mark the 40th anniversary of the recording of "Kaught at the Kampus". The two panel mural contained a full size photograph of the band, as well as a reprint of a fanzine interview with them. Writing for the Irish Examiner, Mike McGrath-Bryan said that the mural recognises a "record that has come to be regarded as a document of the Cork music scene at an important juncture, helping to set the tone for the city's subsequent musical reputation, with many of the musicians and personalities involved becoming cult figures in their own right."

Dineen and ‘Smelly’ O Connell reunited in 2026 as the "Churchfield Boys" to record the one-off song "A little bit awful". The track was described by the critic Gedas Babey as "brilliant" and a "dispassionate, desperate narrative yet a song full of compassion. Hot Press likened it to ... Dry Cleaning but to me it’s more Poison Girls and Siouxsie."

== Band members ==
- Finbarr Donnelly – lead vocals, lyrics (1978–1989)
- Ricky Dineen – guitar, bass (1978–1989)
- Philip O'Connell – bass (1978–1980)
- Keith "Smelly" O'Connell – drums (1978–1985)
- Mick Finnegan – guitar (1979)
- Giordaí Ua Laoghaire – guitar (1979–1980)
- Mick Stack – guitar and bass (1982–1985)
- Úna Ní Chanainn – cello (1982–1983)
- Maurice Carter – bass (1988–1989)
- Daniel Strittmatter – drums (1988–1989)

== Discography ==
The following are the band's official releases. They also recorded three Fanning sessions for RTÉ between 1982 and 1984.

Nun Attax

- Kaught at the Kampus, various artists recorded live at the Arcadia ballroom on 30 August 1980, Reekus Records, 1981

Five Go Down to the Sea?

- Knot a Fish, Kabuki Records, 1983. EP
- The Glee Club, Abstract Sounds, 1984. EP
- Singing in Braille, Creation Records, August 1985, EP
- Hiding from the Landlord, All City Records, 2020, career retrospective album

Beethoven

- Him Goolie Goolie Man, Dem, Setanta Records, June 1989. EP
