= Singing in Braille =

Studio album by Five Go Down to the Sea?
- Released: August 1985
- Recorded: April 1985
- Genre: Post-punk
- Label: Creation Records
- Producer: Joe Foster

Five Go Down to the Sea? chronology
The Glee Club (1984)	Singing in Braille (1985)	Him Goolie Goolie Man, Dem (1989)

Singing in Braille (CRE 021T) is an EP by the Irish post-punk band Five Go Down to the Sea?, released in August 1985 on Creation Records. It was recorded in April 1985 and produced by Joe Foster.

In 1985, the members of Five Go Down to the Sea? met Alan McGee and producer Joe Foster of Creation Records, a label which the band admired. McGee asked them to play a number of gigs at his Living Room club night on Conway Street, Camden. Impressed, McGee remembers that "they were bananas. They would bite Joe's head, Donnelly would lick my ears. But they were good to have in the club if there was ever any threat of violence." According to writer David Cavanagh, during band's gigs at the Living Room, "Donnelly...snatched pints from the hands of people in the crowd, and shouted surreal, Flann O'Brien-esque lyrics while his colleagues clonked out ramshackle, all-elbows rhythms."

The band's guitarist and co-song writer Ricky Dineen was unhappy with the recording and said in 2014 that while he liked the Foster, the band was trying to do something that they weren't suited to and that they "were trying to be over the top a bit...and it was a disappointment".

"Singing in Braille" was released in August 1985, but sold just 600 copies. Cavanagh believes that a long term relationship with Creation was never likely, and that doing business with them would have been extremely difficult. The label's art director Peter Fowler remembers visiting them in Rotherhithe where he said "they were living with ten builders...They invited us around for tea, and they brought out a tray of jelly babies. Then they turned the TV and sat down. [We] thought 'this is a joke - the hamburgers will be coming out any minute.' But they just sat there with a knife and fork and ate jelly babies. I've spoken since to people who've said "No they weren't doing it for show. That's what they did."

== Track listing ==
- Singing In Braille
- Aunt Nelly – 03:25
- Silk Brain Worm Women

== Personnel ==
- Finbarr Donnelly – lead vocals
- Ricky Dineen – guitar, bass
- Mick Stack – guitar
- Keith O'Connell – drums; percussion
