= That's What Friends Are For (disambiguation) =

"That's What Friends Are For" is a 1982 song written by Burt Bacharach and Carole Bayer Sager, best known from the 1985 version by Dionne Warwick and Friends.

That's What Friends Are For may also refer to:

- "That's What Friends Are For" (Barbara Mandrell song), 1976
- "That's What Friends Are For" (Deniece Williams song), 1977
- "That's What Friends Are For" (Modern Romance song), 1984
- "That's What Friends Are For" (Slade song), 1987
- "That's What Friends Are For" (The Swarbriggs song), representing Ireland at Eurovision 1975
- "That's What Friends Are For (The Vulture Song)", from the 1967 Disney film The Jungle Book
- That's What Friends Are For (Johnny Mathis and Deniece Williams album), 1978
- That's What Friends Are For (The Moondogs album), 1981
- "That's What Friends Are For?", an episode of the TV series Hannah Montana
