= Knot a Fish =

Studio album by Five Go Down to the Sea?
- Released: 1983
- Recorded: Autumn 1982
- Studio: Sullane Studios, County Cork, Ireland
- Genre: Post-punk
- Label: Kabuki records
- Producer: John O'Sullivan

Five Go Down to the Sea? chronology
Kaught at the Kampus (1981)	Knot a Fish (1983)	The Glee Club (1984)

Knot a Fish is the debut and most critically acclaimed EP by the Irish post-punk band Five Go Down to the Sea?, released in 1983 on the London-Irish label Kabuki records and distributed by Rough Trade. Recorded just after the band changed their name from Nun Attax, it is the only of their recordings to feature cellist Úna Ní Chanainn, and is widely considered their best work.

The EP was recorded at Sulán Studios, Ballyvourney, in the autumn of 1982, shortly before the band relocated from Cork City to London. Only Ní Chanainn stayed behind.

== Reception ==
In 2001, Cathal Coughlan of Microdisney and The Fatima Mansions said that the EP "was just incredible...completely different to Nun Attax mostly; it wasn't like a rock band anymore, it was...bizarre but coherent. Nothing went on for longer than two and a half minutes..[it was] a completely focused attack of extreme Cork eccentricity with Donnelly's sensibility; for the first time he was singing in his Belfast accent some of the time."

== Track listing ==
- "Fishes for Compliments" – 03:40
- "Elephants for Fun and Profit" – 02:20
- "There's a Fish on Top of Shandon (Swears He's Elvis)" – 02:43
- "Why Wait Until April"

== Personnel ==
- Finbarr Donnelly – lead vocals
- Ricky Dineen – guitar, bass
- Mick Stack – guitar
- Úna Ní Chanainn – cello
- Keith O'Connell – drums; percussion
