= Liam Heffernan =

Irish actor and musician

- Born: Cork
- Occupations: Actor, musician
- Years active: c. 1980-present

Liam Heffernan is an Irish actor, theater director and musician best known for his lead role in the critically acclaimed film The Clash of the Ash (1987), and later as the traveller Blackie Connors in the long running RTÉ television drama series Glenroe.

His music career began in the early 1980s as the guitarist with Mean Features, active during Cork city's post-punk scene. He is currently the lead singer and a guitarist with Big Boy Foolish.

== Film and TV career ==
Born in Cork city in the early 1960s, Heffernan's acting career began in 1984 with appearances in various theater parts with the Graffiti Theatre Company. He moved to Dublin in 1986, and played roles in the films The Stranger Within (1990) and The Boy from Mercury (1996). He has since featured in multiple stage productions and television dramas, including full time roles in Ros na Rún and later Fair City, where he played the returned emigrant Luke Dillon.

Heffernan directed the award-winning 2000 play "Tillsonburg" for Dublin's Focus Theatre and Cork's The Everyman Palace, and in 2003 directed "Brilliant Traces" for the Dublin Fringe Festival. In 2010 he appeared in a well regarded production of Billy Roche's play "The Cavalcaders".

== Music career ==
His music career began in the early 1980s as the guitarist with Mean Features, who were active during the Cork city post-punk scene for several years, initially as part of the bands centered around the Arcadia Ballroom. The band featured Mick Lynch on vocals and were included on the seminal 1981 live compilation Kaught at the Kampus, described in 2020 by journalist Mike McGrath-Bryan of the Irish Examiner as a "record has come to be regarded as a document of the Cork music scene at an important juncture, helping to set the tone for the city's subsequent musical reputation, with many of the musicians and personalities involved becoming cult figures in their own right."

Heffernan is the lead singer and a guitarist with Big Boy Foolish, which he formed c. 2020 with guitarist Ricky Dineen (formerly of Five Go Down to the Sea?. In June 2020, Big Boy Foolish released their debut single "Horsey!", described by Mike McGrath Bryan of The Evening Echo as continuing Dineen's sound "along a grinning, black-humored trajectory". McGrath in 2021 wrote that "unsatisfied with nostalgia, the pair have spent the last number of years cultivating a body of idiosyncratic, drum machine-propelled tunes that sit somewhere to the left of the current wave of genre revivalism." The band released a series of singles between 2000 and 2023 including "Up the Airy" (August 2020) and "Nunzerkat" (January 2021).

Big Boy Foolish's debut album "Stall the Ball" was released in early 2024.

== Selected roles ==
| Role | Production | Year |
|---|---|---|
| Phil Kelly | The Clash of the Ash | 1987 |
| Uncle Tommy | The Stranger within me | 1994 |
| Usher | The Boy from Mercury | 1996 |
| Blackie Conors | Glenroe | 1992 - 1999 |
| Kimbal | Deich gCoisceim | 2000 |

== Sources ==
- Browne, Vincent (2 June 2001). "'I wound up, if not an agriculture expert, at least an expert on how they spoke and thought' (Part 2)". Irish Times.
- Colgan, Gerry (23 October 2000). "Tillsonburg]". Irish Times.
- Cunningham, Michael (July 1987). "Visions of a vibrant film industry". Irish Times.
- Lee, Jenifer (7 December 2010). "The Cavalcaders". Irish Theatre Magazine.
- Lord, Miriam (2 June 1987). "Budding director's Clash Of The Ash is a hit". Irish Independent.
- O'Driscoll, Des (15 July 2020). "Question of Taste: Cork actor and musician Liam Heffernan answers our quick-fire questions". Irish Examiner.
- Mac, Dave (24 September 2020). "From Nun Attax & Five Go Down To The Sea, Ricky Dineen is now Big Boy Foolish". Red FM.
- McGrath-Bryan, Mike (18 February 2021). "Post-punk progression from Leeside 30elegends Big Boy Foolish". The Evening Echo.
- McGrath-Bryan, Mike (25 August 2020). "'Kaught at the Kampus' gig remembered 40 years later with Grand Parade mural". Irish Examiner.
- Power, Ed (29 July 2020). "B-Side the Leeside: Kaught at the Kampus". Irish Examiner.
- Sheridan, Colette (24 November 2012). "The pay's the thing". Irish Examiner.
