= Sweet Jane (band) =

Irish Band

- Also known as: Buffalo Sunn
- Origin: Ireland
- Genre: Indie rock
- Years active: 2008–present
- Label: Reekus
- Members: Danda Paxton; Neil Paxton; Ruairi Paxton; Donagh O Brien; Conor Paxton
- Past members: Lydia Des Dolles
- Website: reekus.com

Sweet Jane are an Irish band formed in 2008. The current line-up consists of Danda Paxton (lead guitar/vocals), Neil Paxton (backing vocals/keyboards/guitar), Ruairi Paxton (bass), Conor Paxton (guitar), and Donagh O Brien (drums).

The group began working together after guitarist and songwriter Danda Paxton asked Lydia Des Dolles to provide vocals on a number of tracks he had written. Along with Ruairi Paxton and Donagh O'Brien, they recorded and released their first EP, 'Black Boots and Black Hearts'. 2009 saw the band sign to Irish Label Reekus Records and together they released "You're Making This Hard" which included Sweet Jane's cover of Silent Night. The following year, the band released their debut album Sugar for My Soul to positive reviews.

The band's music has been played on the several RTÉ TV shows including the very popular Fade Street. The band gained mainstream notice with articles profiling the band's music in several respected publications including The Irish Times, Heineken Music Ireland and Hotpress amongst many others. Internationally, the band have seen their debut released in Asia and have had their music featured on MTV Skins and also on the DJ Hero Video Game.

In 2011 Lydia joined a host of other artists to record a cover of the Coldplay single Fix You for Music Matters Asia, which was released through Universal Music Group with all proceeds going to victims of the earthquake in Japan.

== Sugar For My Soul ==
Sweet Jane's debut album was released through Reekus Records in July 2010. The album was reviewed by various blogs and newspapers around the globe. In the UK it reached the # 27 slot on the blog Battery in Your Leg's best albums of the year list. The Irish times reviewed the band's debut album. Irish online magazine State believed that " Sweet Jane have proved that they have the potential to walk it as well as they talk it". The established and successful blog thedumbingofamerica wrote a piece entitled "Your New Favourite Band" and interviewed Sweet Jane for an article posted on the blog. The first UK release was a new version of the track 'Close Your Eyes' and the single received significant airplay in the UK and garnered the band interest from the media. The band were featured in RTÉ's interactive music series The Raw Sessions in which they performed a selection of songs from their debut album. Sweet Jane had their music featured on the first season of RTÉ's Fade Street, as well other RTÉ show's including Kitchen Hero and Raw. The band's debut was released in Asia through Warners/ TocoAsia in Singapore, Malaysia, HMV in Hong Kong, and licensed by Synergy in the Philippines.

== Live shows ==
2010 saw the band play a slot at one of Europe's biggest music festivals Oxegen. Their live set has been described as an energetic roller coaster of sleazy guitars, achingly sexy vocals, split between Lydia & Danda, and topped off with their trademark "dream-pop rock 'n roll. 2010 was a busy year for the band with regard to touring. The band toured extensively through the UK and Ireland, gigging alongside Glasvegas, Black Rebel Motorcycle Club, A Place to Bury Strangers, The Kills, White Lies, The Duke Spirit and the Besnard Lakes, as well as tour dates on Alan Mc Gee's Death Disco. The band also played at the world-renowned music festival SXSW In May 2011 they opened for Suede on all three nights of their Olympia Theatre residency.

In 2011 they embarked on a tour of Southeast Asia to support of Sugar For My Soul which garnered interest from several Asian media organisations, Channel 5 Asia.

== Current ==
In 2011 the band competed against hundreds of other acts to have their music featured in the video game DJ Hero and the MTV show Skins. The group were victorious and were chosen to be played on both the show and the game. Sweet Jane are putting the finishing touches to their sophomore effort with acclaimed music producer Pat Mccarthy with a release date due for spring 2018 . In August 2012 Danda took over lead vocal duties after former vocalist Lydia Des Dolles and the band parted company and Neil (backing vocals, keyboards, guitar) and Conor Paxton (guitars) joined the line-up.

In October 2013 the band changed their name to Buffalo Sunn. Buffalo Sunn released their debut album By The Ocean By The Sea in Ireland on 10 October 2014 through Reekus Records
