= Alan Devlin (actor) =

Irish actor (1946–2011)

- Born: 1948; Dublin, Ireland
- Died: 13 May 2011 (aged 62–63); Dublin
- Occupation: Actor

Alan Devlin (1948–13 May 2011) was an Irish actor.

He was born in Dublin, the son of a jazz musician. He was brought up in Booterstown and studied in Mount Merrion. His acting career began with the New Irish Players in Killarney. He appeared in many TV shows such as Ballykissangel and also performed alongside many internationally recognised film stars in many big Hollywood productions as well as independent productions and on stage in his beloved theatre. He is best known for his roles in Chekhov's The Seagull and Eugene O'Neill's A Moon for the Misbegotten and The Clash of the Ash. He won an Olivier Award for his role in the latter. Devlin died suddenly at his home in Dalkey, Dublin on 13 May 2011.
