= Giordaí Ua Laoghaire =

Irish songwriter and guitarist

Giordaí Ua Laoghaire is an Irish songwriter and guitarist best known as a founding member of Nine Wassies From Bainne (formed 1992), who released the album Ciddy Hall in 1998. Born in Ovens, County Cork in the early 1960s, he has played with Five Go Down to the Sea? (1979–1980), Microdisney (mid-1980's) and Soon (late-1980's). The Wassies were primarily an instrumental band and recorded only a single album.

Musically diverse, Ua Laoghaire cites Rory Gallagher, Mahavishnu Orchestra, Planxty, Yes, Frank Zappa and punk rock as influences. His work has been described as "just too odd a proposition. Lyrically and musically, [his] songs overflowed with ideas. Bilingual, Ua Laoghaire’s lyrics switched between Irish and English as easily as the songs switched from easy-listening passages to disorienting rhythms."

== Bibliography ==
- McAvoy, Mark (2009). Cork Rock: From Rory Gallagher to the Sultans of Ping. Cork: Mercier Press. ISBN 978-1-85635-655-8.
- McDermott, Paul; Byrne, John (2020), Hiding From The Landlord (sleeve notes), Dublin: AllCity Records.
