= The Vipers =

The Vipers were an Irish new wave group of the late 1970s. A live act fronted by Paul Boyle and guitarist George Sweeney, they toured with Thin Lizzy, The Clash and The Jam.

The group was formed as part of a growing punk scene in Dublin the late 1970s. The Vipers played in what was reported to be Ireland's first punk festival in June 1977, along with The Undertones. During the event, a member of the crowd was stabbed and killed, and the Irish punk music scene was subsequently blacklisted.

In 1978, The Vipers headlined a series of live gigs at McGonagles in Dublin, which featured the Dublin-based rock band U2 as the supporting act. Their debut single "I've Got You"/"No Such Thing" (Mulligan LUNS 718) was released in late 1978. This was heard by the BBC's John Peel who invited them to the UK to do a session for his radio programme. A permanent move to London led to UK tours with the Boomtown Rats and Thin Lizzy, as well as performances including at the Marquee, Music Machine and Fulham Greyhound. A further single, "Take Me" was released in 1980.

The group included Boyle (lead vocals/guitar), Sweeney (lead guitar), Brian Foley (bass), and Dave Moloney (drums). Bernie Smirnoff (ex-Hollywood Killers) took over from Moloney, as drummer, in September 1979.

The Vipers disbanded in December 1980. Boyle subsequently changed his career to acting, whilst other members of the group remained musicians. Foley went on to join The Blades, Moloney to the Cajun Kings and Sweeney to The Fat Lady Sings. Bernie Smirnoff later played for Kingbathmat.

Paul Boyle died in London in 2019.
