= The Clash of the Ash =

- 1987 Poster
- Directed by: Fergus Tighe
- Written by: Fergus Tighe
- Produced by: Jane Gogan
- Starring: Liam Heffernan; Gina Moxley; Vinny Murphy; Alan Devlin
- Edited by: Jimmy Duggan
- Music by: The Pogues, various
- Production company: Circus Films
- Release date: 1987
- Running time: 51 minutes
- Country: Ireland
- Language: English

The Clash of the Ash Is a 1987 Irish film written and directed by Fergus Tighe, and starring Liam Heffernan as Phil Kelly, with co-stars Gina Moxley, Vinny Murphy and Alan Devlin. The film is set in the early 1980s and centered around the aspirations of a promising hurler, a popular Gaelic sport in Ireland. The title refers to clash of the ash, the striking of hurleys (made of ash wood) against each other in the game.

The Clash of the Ash was produced by Circus Films and funded by Bórd Scánnán na hEireann and RTÉ. It lasts 51 minutes and was shot largely in Fermoy, County Cork. The soundtrack includes The Pogues cover of Ewan McColl's "Dirty Old Town".

== Plot ==
The Irish Film & Television Network describes it as a story in which the central character Phil is "under pressure from his parents who have decided how his life should proceed, [he] refuses to sit his Leaving Cert. and runs off to London to follow his own ambitions."

According to the Irish Examiner, "the basic script would be familiar to frustrated youngsters anywhere in the world, all of them eager to clear out for the bright lights; the difference here is that the frustrated teenager in this case is a talented hurler."

== Reception ==
The Clash of the Ash was critically acclaimed and became a widespread popular success in Ireland. Time Out described it as a "sensitively portrayed slice of provincial life, which manages to tell its yarn with a great deal of humour and compassion."
