= Big Self =

Northern Irish rock band

- Origin: Belfast, Northern Ireland
- Genres: Punk rock, Post-punk
- Years active: 1979–1986
- Label: Reekus
- Members: Bernard Tohill; Jim Nicholl; Patrick Sheeran; Michael Morris
- Website: www.reekus.com

Big Self are a Northern Irish rock band who formed in 1980. Their line-up consisted of Bernard Tohill on guitars and vocals, Jim Nicholl on guitars, Patmo Sheeran on bass and vocals and Michael Morris on drums. During the early to mid-late 1980s the band were highly praised especially in the UK. However, the band's commercial success never matched their critical success, and they disbanded in 1986. During their career they played at several noted events including Self Aid and recorded BBC sessions for John Peel and Kid Jensen. Their single "Ghostshirts" was featured as the theme song to Dave Fanning's RTÉ TV show Visual Eyes, that aimed to present an entertaining and informative behind the scenes look at the world of popular culture.

== History ==
Big Self were formed in Belfast and were part of the melodic rock movement that emerged in the aftermath of the punk explosion. They formed in 1980 as a three piece, the early line up of Bernard Tohill, Patrick Sheeran and Michael Morris was soon expanded with the addition of Jim Nicholl. Big Self's early sound was influenced by their love of reggae, which led to them to the Reekus Records camp through a string of guest spots on Reekus promoted reggae tours. The band's career quickly picked up momentum with several music magazines including Melody Maker and Sounds, picking their tracks as singles of the week. Sounds named the band's second single "Don't Turn Around" single of the year in 1982. The band developed a devoted following through their live shows and toured alongside acts such as The Beat and U2.

In 1983, they moved to London hoping to improve their prospects of success, returning to Ireland in the winter of 1983/4 to record their debut album, Stateless, with Richard Mainwaring producing. The first single from the album, "Ghostshirts", was critically acclaimed by the leading music press, including NME, Melody Maker and Sounds; but the 18-month delay in releasing their album did not help. The line-up expanded to a six-piece with the addition of Owen Howell (previously drummer with Belfast band Stage B) on percussion, but then drummer Michael Morris returned to live in Belfast, and soon after saxophonist Gordy Blair left to join Australian band Dave Graney and the Rattlesnakes. Big Self's final gig was as a four-piece at the Irish concert Self Aid, where they shared the stage with U2 and Van Morrison, Elvis Costello, and the Pogues.

== Stateless ==
The group's line-up expanded to a six piece with addition of Gordy Blair on saxophone and percussionist Owen Howell. The group acquired a publishing deal with Chappel Music and, in 1983, began recording their debut album Stateless in Windmill Lane Studios. The album's release was delayed for eighteen months due to the collapse of the distribution company IDS. Unfortunately, by the time the album was finally released Big Self's member had begun to drift apart with members emigrating to Australia and other members leaving to join other bands.

== Current ==
A renewed interest in the band has been sparked with the remastered and re issued release of their debut album on CD. The group's music is also featured on the Reekus Records compilation CD Too Late To Stop Now, which has received excellent reviews from several publications including the Irish Times and Hot Press.
