= Teenage Drug =

Studio album by The Sultans of Ping
- Released: March 1994
- Genre: Punk rock, indie rock
- Label: Rhythm King, Epic
- Producer: Steve Lovell

The Sultans of Ping chronology
Casual Sex in the Cineplex (1993)	Teenage Drug (1994)	Good Year For Trouble (1996)

Teenage Drug is the second album from Irish band The Sultans of Ping. It was released in March 1994, and reached #54 in the UK album chart.

== Track listing ==
1. "Teenage Drug"
2. "Wake Up & Scratch Me"
3. "Teenage Punks"
4. "Curse"
5. "Michiko"
6. "Love & Understanding"
7. "Psychopath"
8. "Terrorist Angel"
9. "Teenrage Rock & Roll Girl"
10. "Pussycat"
11. "Sisters"
12. "Pussycat" (Reprise)
13. "Telephone Lover"
14. "Red Cadillac and Black Moustache"

== Personnel ==
- Niall O'Flaherty - vocals
- Pat O'Connell - guitar
- Alan McFeely - bass
- Morty McCarthy - drums

== Chart positions ==
Chart (1994)	Peak position
UK Albums Chart	54
