= Casual Sex in the Cineplex =

Studio album by the Sultans of Ping FC
- Released: 1993
- Genre: Punk rock, indie rock
- Producer: Rhythm King

The Sultans of Ping FC chronology
Casual Sex in the Cineplex (1993)	Teenage Drug (1994)

Casual Sex in the Cineplex is the debut album by the Sultans of Ping FC, recorded for Rhythm King and released in 1993.

== Critical reception ==
Trouser Press praised the "silly shoutalong yobbo charmers".

== Track listing ==
1. "Back in a Tracksuit"
2. "Indeed You Are"
3. "Veronica"
4. "2 Pints of Rasa"
5. "Stupid Kid"
6. "You Talk Too Much"
7. "Give Him a Ball (And a Yard of Grass)"
8. "Karaoke Queen"
9. "Let's Go Shopping"
10. "Kick Me with Your Leather Boots"
11. "Clitus Clarke"
12. "Where's Me Jumper?"

== Personnel ==
- Niall O'Flaherty – vocals
- Pat O'Connell – guitar
- Alan McFeely – bass
- Morty McCarthy – drums

== Chart position ==
Year	Chart	Position
1993	UK Albums Chart	23
