= The Blades (band) =

Punk/new wave band from Dublin, primarily active in 1970s/80s

- Origin: Ringsend, Dublin, Ireland
- Genres: New wave, power pop
- Years active: 1977–1981, 1982–1986, 2013–current
- Labels: Raytown Records, Reekus Records
- Members: Paul Cleary; Jake Reilly; Brian Foley; Conor Brady; Frank Duff; Paul Grimes
- Past members: Laurence Cleary; Pat Larkin; John Burke; Joe Donnelly; Pat Fitzpatrick

The Blades are an Irish new wave band who formed in the late 1970s in the South Dublin neighbourhood of Ringsend, with songwriter Paul Cleary on bass and vocals, his brother Laurence on guitar and friend Pat Larkin on drums. The original line-up released two seven inch singles: "Hot For You" and "Ghost of a Chance", the latter of which they performed on The Late Late Show in 1981.

== History ==
=== Origins (1977–81) ===
The Blades began in the summer of 1977 when five friends got together to play a gig in the CYMS hall in Ringsend. The lineup was then whittled down to three: Paul Cleary (born 9 September 1959) on bass and vocals, his brother Lar (born 21 June 1957) on guitar, and friend Pat Larkin (born 25 November 1956) on drums.

The band regularly played in Dublin's famous venues like The Magnet on Pearse Street, McGonagle's on South Anne Street and The Baggot Inn on Lower Baggot Street, where they did a six-week residency with U2, with whom they would have a rivalry which would dominate discussion of the group.

Their first single, "Hot For You", was released in 1980, followed by "Ghost of a Chance" in 1981, which they played on The Late Late Show. In 1984, John Porter produced their first album, The Last Man in Europe, but due to personnel changes at the record company, it wasn't released in England.

=== Reshuffle (1981–86) ===
Pat left the band in March 1981 to be replaced by Jake Reilly on drums. The new lineup of Paul, Larry, and Jake played their first gig in The Magnet Bar in Pearse Street on 18 July 1981; later that summer, Paul switched to guitar and brought in bassist Brian Foley (formerly of The Vipers). After Larry left the band in 1982, Paul decided to add a brass section with Paul Grimes on trombone and Frank Duff on trumpet.

In March 1982, the band released a double A-sided single, "The Bride Wore White" / "Animation". In the Hot Press National Poll, "The Bride Wore White" was voted best single while The Blades were voted 'the most promising act in Ireland' and Paul Cleary beat Van Morrison and Bono to the 'best Irish songwriter'. However, by this stage they were being eclipsed commercially by their rivals U2.

"U2 and The Blades joined up in the summer of 1979 for a double- header six-week residency at the Baggot Inn. The result was a culture clash of sounds and styles that left no one the wiser about which way the A&R fairy godmother would point her wand. U2 went on to meet Brian Eno, buy some Stetsons and get on the cover of Time magazine. The Blades were flung from record company pillar to post but never lost their knack for three-minute pop-soul classics – not least Hot for You and Ghost of a Chance." Brian Boyd, The Irish Times

In 1985, The Blades released the album The Last Man in Europe, and that same year, Conor Brady was recruited as the band's main guitarist.

=== Post break-up ===
Paul Cleary continued with a band The Partisans, and later led an eight-piece pub rock band called The Cajun Kings. He also released solo material. In 2001, the band released a double CD boxset, Those were the Days, which included both The Last Man in Europe and Raytown Revisited.

In Roddy Doyle's novel The Commitments The Blades are mentioned when Jimmy Rabbitte remarks that he recognises people in the audience as having been at Blades' gigs years earlier. The implication was that Blades fans were working class and knew their music, but were also slightly older than other Dublin gig-goers.

=== Reunion And Smalltime EP (2013–present) ===
The Blades reformed in 2013 for some live performances in Dublin, including an appearance on The Late Late Show in November 2013. In November 2015, they released their first new music as The Blades since 1985 with a 4-track EP entitled Smalltime, which received positive reviews. In December 2016 The Blades released their comeback album 'Modernised' on Raytown Records, which contained twelve new original songs written by Paul Cleary. In January 2024, they performed on RTE's The Tommy Tiernan Show. The band still plays regularly around Ireland, and are very much looking forward to their 50th anniversary in 2027.

== Discography ==
=== Studio albums ===
- Modernised (2016)

CD – Raytown Records – RAYCD 2 LP – Raytown Records – RAYLP 1

- The Last Man in Europe (1985)

LP – Reekus Records – RKLP1 – IRL – 1985 – matte B&W cover +inner; distributed by WEA Ireland LP – Reekus Records – RKLP1 – UK – 1985 – slick colour front cover adds "featuring Paul Cleary"; different back cover LP – Disc AZ/Reekus Records – 509 – France – 1987 – shiny textured sleeve +inner; slightly different from UK cover w/ red logo +2 bonus tracks CD – Reekus Records – RK CD1 – 2000

- Raytown Revisited 1980-85 (1985)

LP – Reekus Records – RKLP3 – IRL – 1985 CD – Reekus Records – RK CD2 – 2000 – with three bonus tracks (including two 1979 demos)

=== Compilation albums ===
- Those Were The Days (2000)

2xCD – Reekus Records – RK BOXCD1 – 2000 – box/slipcase Two-CD set in slipcase consisting of RKCD1 + RKCD2

- Too Late To Stop Now: Reekus Records 30th Anniversary Compilation (2011)

2xCD – Reekus Records – RKBOXCD1 – 2011 – box/slipcase

- RTÉ Radio 2 Presents in Concert (1985)

LP – RTÉ Records – RTÉ 92 – IRL – 1985

=== Singles ===
- "Hot For You" / "The Reunion" (1980)

7" – Energy/Polygram Records – NRG-3 [2001 959] – IRL – PS paper labels 7" – Energy Records – NRG-3 – UK – PS plastic labels

- "Ghost of a Chance" / "Real Emotion" (1981)

7" – Energy/Polygram Records – NRG-5 – IRL – PS paper labels 7" – Energy Records – NRG-5 – UK – PS plastic labels

- "The Bride Wore White" / "Animation" (1982)

7" – Reekus Records – RKS005 – IRL – PS +insert

- "Revelations of Heartbreak" / "Rules of Love" (1982)

7" – Reekus Records – RKS007 – IRL – PS

- "Downmarket" / "You Never Ask" (1983)

7" – Reekus Records – RKS010 – IRL – PS

- "Last Man in Europe" / "Sadlands" (1984)

7" – Reekus Records – RKS013 – IRL – PS

- "Those Were The Days" / "Stand By Me Now" (Paul Cleary) (1985)

7" – Reekus Records 7" – Reekus Records – picture disc CD "Smalltime" EP-Reekus Records RKCD 157 (2015) CD Raytown Records RAYCD1

- "The Great Wall of America" / "Kingfisher Blue" (2016)

CD Raytown Records RAYCD 2

- "Modernised" (2016)
