= Paul McDermott (documentarian) =

Irish producer and broadcaster

Paul McDermott is an Irish producer and broadcaster best known for his audio documentaries on the bands Five Go Down to the Sea?, Stump, Microdisney and the 1970s experimental musician Michael O'Shea.

== Career ==
McDermott began to produce audio documentaries in the early 2000's. Describing the Five Go Down to the Sea? documentary "Get That Monster Off The Stage, parts I & II", broadcaster Mike McGrath-Bryan said that they "comprehensively cover both the legacy of Finbarr Donnelly and really the post-punk scene that was operating out of [Cork in the early 1980s]. [The documentaries] lead to an increased knowledge of the history of the Cork music scene; the relative ahistoricality has been shaken off". The documentary won the "Radio Production of the Year" award at the 2002 SMEDIA Awards. Myles Dungan, chairman of the judging panel, said: “This is a fascinating snapshot of the vibrant Cork music scene of the 80’s. The producer constructed a compelling account of cult rock hero Finbarr Donnelly. The program itself is an excellent weave of music and the spoken word, and is unobtrusively informative." The documentary was re-edited in 2008 to include contributions from band guitarist Ricky Dineen. In a later interview, Dineen said that he had withdrawn from playing music until the revival of interest created by the documentary.

McDermott's 2017 documentary on Microdisney, "Iron Fist in Velvet Glove", was described by The Guardian as "brilliant", while Hot Press wrote it was "the stellar work of [a] post-punk historian". "No Journeys End" debuted in August 2019 on RTÉ lyric fm, and covers the life of Michael O'Shea, a travelling street musician from Carlingford, County Louth, whose only album, the self-titled "Michael O'Shea", was released in 1982. A review in the Irish Times described the documentary as "retracing the picaresque life of innovative street musician Michael O'Shea to fascinating effect".

== Audio documentaries ==
- "Dancing in the Disco – The story of The Sultans of Ping". (February 2023)
- "'Fail We May, Sail We Must' – A Tribute to Andrew Weatherall", February 2022
- "No Journeys End – The story of Michael O'Shea", RTÉ lyric fm, 2019
- "Iron Fist in Velvet Glove – The story of Microdisney", UCC 98.3FM, 2017; Newstalk, 2018 and 2020
- "Lights! Camel! Action! – The Story of Stump", UCC 98.3FM, 2016
- "Get That Monster Off The Stage", UCC 98.3FM, part I, 2001 (re-edited in 2008), part II in 2016
