= Michael O'Shea (musician) =

- Birth name: Michael Oliver O'Shea
- Born: 11 July 1947; Newry, Northern Ireland
- Died: 23 December 1991 (aged 44); London, England
- Genres: World music, experimental
- Occupation: Musician
- Labels: Dome

Michael Oliver O'Shea (11 July 1947 – 23 December 1991) was an Irish musician who played a zither-like instrument of his own making, and released a self-titled album in 1982.

== Biography ==
Born in Newry, the son of a policeman, O'Shea left school at 16 and soon afterwards joined the British Army. He went absent without leave, was court-martialled and jailed, and on his release lived in London where he played harmonica and mixed with folk musicians such as Peggy Seeger. He undertook a wide range of jobs and activities over the years, which by his own account included "barman, waiter, soldier, labourer, packer, wireman, hippie, factory worker, salesman, hobo, manager, leather craftsman, odd job man, clerical worker, reconciliation relief worker, social worker, sculptor, designer, collector, joker, transvestite, inventor, psychonaut, actor, catalyst, community worker, musician, traveller, instrument maker...".

In the mid-1970s, he travelled to Bangladesh as a volunteer relief worker, returning with serious illnesses and a sitar, which he learned to play while convalescing. He then travelled to France, other parts of Europe and the Middle East, making a living as a street musician. He constructed his own instrument, Mo Cara, and later wrote:

The instrument 'Mo Cara' (Gaelic for 'My friend') is a combination of at least three instruments. The basic dulcimer shape was taken from an instrument designed and made by an Algerian musician, Kris Hosylan Harpo, who accompanied me on his 'Zelochord' when I was playing Indian sitar in France during the summer of '78. Having sold my sitar in Germany and being desperate for money to travel to Turkey I conceived the idea of combining both sitar and Zelochord. The first Mo Cara was born, taken from the middle of a door which was rescued from a skip in Munchen, Germany. ... Three days later I was playing Mo Cara Mk. I in Greece for a living. The second and most important development began when I returned to the UK in '79 and made Mk. II. Keeping the original Zelochord/sitar sound I added the sound from another instrument which I had invented, the 'Black Hole Space Echo Box', and to finish the new Mo Cara I added amplification and electronics. The result was a sound that pleased and fascinated me...

He busked in Covent Garden and the London Underground, with his Mo Cara, a 17-stringed instrument which he played using paintbrushes or (in some reports) chopsticks. In early 1980 he was approached to perform at Ronnie Scott's Jazz Club, and Scott arranged for him to perform at the Royal Festival Hall as the opening act for a concert by Ravi Shankar. He worked on an unreleased project with Rick Wakeman, and toured with Don Cherry, but then returned to busking in Covent Garden, where he was seen by cartoonist and musician Tom Johnston, of The The. Johnston introduced O'Shea to Bruce Gilbert and Graham Lewis of Wire, who offered to record O'Shea for their label, Dome. Known for his eccentricities, O'Shea was reluctant to be tied down to recording, but, a year later, in July 1981, turned up ready to record, saying that "the planets have lined up in the right way so I was thinking today’s the day". He recorded the album in one day at Blackwing Studio and it was released, but drew little attention at the time. The opening 15-minute track, "No Journey's End", was described in the Irish Times as "a thrilling piece of music [in which] O’Shea plays Mo Chara like a wooden gateway to different cultures, drawing from Indian tones, Middle Eastern scales and Irish tradition..".

In 1982, O'Shea worked with Johnston and bandmate Matt Johnson on a second album, which fell through, and also recorded two tracks with Irish experimental musician Stano (John Denver Stanley) on the album Content To Write In I Dine Weathercraft. He continued to make his own instruments, and played on the title track of Larry Cosgrave's 1985 album Easter Island. O'Shea rarely performed publicly during the late 1980s and 1990s, and became involved in the growth of rave culture.

He died in December 1991, aged 44, from injuries suffered when he was hit by a van in London.

His album was reissued on CD in 2001 and again by AllChival Records in Dublin in 2019, with additional tracks from his 1982 and 1985 recordings.
