= The Moondogs (band) =

Rock group from Northern Ireland

- Origin: Northern Ireland
- Genres: Punk, rock, Power pop
- Years active: 1979–present
- Labels: Reekus Records; Good Vibrations
- Members: Gerry McCandless; Austin Barrett; Jackie Hamilton
- Website: Official website

The Moondogs are a Northern Irish rock band formed in 1979, and consisting of Gerry McCandless, Austin Barrett and Jackie Hamilton. Their career spans three albums, four singles and two television programmes.

== Discography ==
=== Singles ===
- "She's Nineteen" b/w "Ya Don't Do Ya" (1979)
- "Who's Gonna Tell Mary?" b/w "Overcaring Parents" (1980)
- "Talking in the Canteen" b/w "Make Her Love Me - You Said" (1981)
- "Imposter" b/w "Baby Snatcher" (1981)

=== Studio albums ===
- That's What Friends Are For (1981)
- John Peel Sessions (2003)
- Red Fish (2003)

=== Compilation albums ===
- Good Vibrations Punk Singles / "Ya Don't Do Ya" (Anagram - UK)
- The Good Vibrations Story / "She's 19" (1994, Dojo - UK)
- Powerpearls Vol.3 / "Who's Gonna Tell Mary" (Germany)
- Now in Session / "That's What Friends Are For" (1982, Downtown Radio - Ireland)

=== Promotional items ===
- Getting Off in Amsterdam - Everydaythings (2003, Reekus - Ireland)

=== Unreleased tracks ===
- "EEC Lov"
- "Two Timed"
- "Boys Stories"
- "TV Girl"
- "Tell Tail"
- "Jenny"
- "I Am Trembling"
- "Powerpop"
- "Ten Minutes Late"
- "Hey Joanna"

== Other works ==
=== Television ===
- Shellshock Rock (1979 film, featuring The Moondogs, The Outcats, Rudi, Ruefrex, SLF, The Undertones and Protex)
- Moondogs Matinee (The Moondogs television programme ran for approximately seven shows in early 1981, and featured them playing live mixed with pop videos of the day. The theme tune to the show was their song, "Powerpop").

=== Film ===
- The Moondogs had four of their songs featured in the film, Dead Long Enough
