= That's What Friends Are For (The Moondogs album) =

That's What Friends are For

Studio album by The Moondogs
- Released: 1981
- Recorded: 1981
- Label: Sire - Germany
- Producer: Todd Rundgren

That's What Friends Are For is a 1981 album by the Northern Irish band the Moondogs. A boot re-issue of this LP with a different inner sleeve was released in Germany in 1999. It included three bonus tracks taken from 7" releases.

== Track listing ==
=== Side one ===
1. "I Wanna Be a Pop Star"
2. "Who's Gonna Tell Mary?"
3. "That's The Way It Goes"
4. "That's What Friends Are For"
5. "Schoolgirl Crush"
6. "I Lit a Fire"

=== Side two ===
1. "Home Is Where the Heart Is"
2. "Dream Girl"
3. "Zulu"
4. "This Girl"
5. "I'm Not Sleeping"
6. "Dressed to Kill"

== Personnel ==
The Moondogs

- Gerry McCandless - guitar, vocals
- Jackie Hamilton - bass, vocals
- Austin Barrett - drums
