= Buffalo Sunn =

- Origin: Dublin, Ireland
- Genres: Rock, indie, folk rock
- Years active: 2013-present
- Label: Reekus Records
- Members: Daniel Paxton; Conor Paxton; Patrick McHugh; Nathan Maher; Aidan O'Grady
- Past members: Ruairi Paxton; Jimmy Cullen; Neil Paxton; Donagh O' Brien
- Website: buffalosunn.com

Buffalo Sunn are a rock band from Dublin, Ireland. Signed to Reekus Records, they released their debut album, By The Ocean By The Sea, on 10 October 2014, which has garnered critical praise from Irish media. They are in production for their next album, due out in 2016.

== By The Ocean By The Sea ==
Buffalo Sunn's first album, By The Ocean By The Sea, was released on 10 October 2014 on Reekus Records. The album was produced by Grammy winning producer Pat McCarthy. The album debuted on the Irish indie album charts at #2, and the overall album charts at #14. Both The Irish Times and The Irish Daily Star gave the album 4 out of 5 stars, with The Irish Times complimenting the band's "strong, intuitive sense of West Coast US music."

The album was released in Germany, Austria and Switzerland on 30 January 2015 via Rough Trade Distribution/Brainstorm. The U.S. release of the album was on 15 June 2015, and it was released worldwide on 15 September 2015.

== Live Shows ==
The band has performed at multiple music festivals over the world, including Music Matters in Singapore, CMJ Music Marathon in the USA, Oxegen, Electric Picnic and Hard Working Class Heroes in Ireland. They have developed a reputation as an impressive live act with Today Online (Singapore) writing "Buffalo Sunn endeared themselves to lovers of reverb-drenched country-folk coming across like a post-punk version of Crosby Stills & Nash, resplendent with their angelic harmonies." In February 2015 they embarked on a tour of Germany to promote the release of their album in the country.

The band followed their German tour with a tour of the United States in March and April 2015, kicking off at South By Southwest in Austin, Texas and playing dates across the West Coast as part of the Passport Approved Spring 2015 Tour. They completed their tour with an appearances at A&R Worldwide's Musexpo in Los Angeles, California.

== Discography ==
=== Singles & EPs ===
- "Seven Seas" (Ireland only) – November 2013 (RKCD 137)
- "By Your Side" – April 2014 (RKCD 141)
- Witches EP – June 2014 (RKCD 135)
- "Ocean" – September 2014 (RKCD 148)
- Ocean EP (US only) – September 2014 (RKCD 151)

=== Albums ===
- By the Ocean by the Sea – October 2014 (RKCD 147)
