= Him Goolie Goolie Man, Dem =

Studio album by Beethoven
- Released: 1989
- Recorded: 1988
- Genre: Post-punk
- Label: Setanta Records
- Producer: Jon Langford

Beethoven chronology
Singing in Braille (1985)	Him Goolie Goolie Man, Dem (1989)

Him Goolie Goolie Man, Dem is a five track EP by the Irish post-punk band Beethoven Fucking Beethoven (formerly known as Five Go Down to the Sea?) released on the London-Irish label Setanta Records in June 1989. It was both the last album by the band, and the debut release by Keith Cullen's then fledgling Setanta.

The EP was well received on release. Steven Wells named the record "Single of the Week" in the NME, and wrote that "the centre-stone of this jewel of a record is the kidnapping, tarring and feathering, mugging, shagging and destruction of 'Day Tripper'". However, before the band could capitalise on this success, vocalist Finbarr Donnelly died in a drowning accident on 18 June 1989.

== Background and recording ==
When the first incarnation of Five Go Down to the Sea? broke up in 1984, lead vocalist Finbarr Donnelly and guitarist Ricky Dineen remained in London after the split. They moved from Rotherhithe to Shepherd's Bush, where early 1988 they recruited Dublin-born bassist Maurice Carter and Swiss drummer Daniel Strittmatter and reformed under the name Beethoven. After a debut gig at the Mean Fiddler, the band came to the attention of Keith Cullen, owner of Setanta Records, and for a period he acted as their manager and promoter. The band released an EP, Him Goolie Goolie Man, Dem, in early June 1989, produced by Jon Langford of the Mekons and the Three Johns. It was Setanta's first release, and contained five tracks, including a cover of "Day Tripper" by the Beatles.

A few weeks after release, on 18 June 1989, Donnelly drowned while swimming in Hyde Park's Serpentine Pond, at the age of 27. Dineen had been out with him that day, and they had planned to meet at a pub later in the evening. Dineen said, "If you went out for the craic with your friends on a Sunday afternoon and one of them didn't come back, it's surreal-like. Even though we were both 27, you're still young. It changes your whole life because we went from planning our future, thinking we were going to be in England for a while, to the next minute being on the flight back to Ireland."

A second EP, planned to feature a cover of Queen's "Bohemian Rhapsody", was never recorded. Dineen was grief-stricken and with the band at a sudden end, said that he "drank [his] way though the 90s" until his career revived in the early 2000s.

== Reception ==
The EP was the NME's "Single of the Week" in their 3 June 1989 edition. In his review, NME writer Steven Wells called it a "jewel of a record" and praised the B-side "Jehovah's Wombles". Melody Maker journalist David Stubbs gave a less favourable review, describing Donnelly's vocals as "a wail of 'WHOOOAAAS', like brickies on a roller coaster". Neil Perry of Sounds who described the album "missing links between Stump and The Birthday Party", said "When you want to shout, 'F***!' in public, go home and listen to this instead." Ua Laoghaire found that the new songs lacked the outward humour of Five Go Down To The Sea?, reflecting the bitterness of Donnelly and Dineen's music industry experience, but felt the band had retained their edge.

== Personnel ==
- Finbarr Donnelly – lead vocals
- Ricky Dineen – guitar
- Daniel Strittmatter – drums
- Maurice Carter – bass

== Track listing ==
- "Day Tripper" – 02:54
- "Jehovah's Wombles (Yaweh)"
- "Two Samies"
- "Channel Blocks?" – 02:33
- "Wince..." – 02:58
