= Kaught at the Kampus =

1981 live compilation album

Live album by Various artists
- Released: 1981
- Recorded: 30 August 1980
- Genre: Post-punk
- Label: Reekus Records

Kaught at the Kampus is a live compilation 12-inch EP conceived and organised by Irish promoter Elvera Butler, and released in 1981 on her Reekus Records label. A showcase of then emerging Cork city punk and post-punk bands, it contains tracks by Nun Attax (later known as Five Go Down to the Sea?), Mean Features (featuring Mick Lynch (vocals) and Liam Heffernan (guitar)), Urban Blitz (who later became Cypress, Mine!) and Microdisney (whose members Cathal Coughlan and Sean O'Hagan later formed The Fatima Mansions and The High Llamas respectively.)

The album was recorded live at the Arcadia Ballroom (commonly known as the Arc), Cork, Ireland, on 30 August 1980. Nun Attax were at the time scene leaders, and given three tracks on side one. Microdisney went on to international recognition with their 1985 album The Clock Comes Down The Stairs.

Following reissued of stock copies in 2015 and 2020, the compilation was re-pressed on vinyl and fully reissued in 2021 on its 40th anniversary. Writing in 2020, Mike McGrath-Bryan of the Irish Examiner said that the mural recognises a "record has come to be regarded as a document of the Cork music scene at an important juncture, helping to set the tone for the city's subsequent musical reputation, with many of the musicians and personalities involved becoming cult figures in their own right."

== Background ==
The Arcadia was run by Thurles native Elvera Butler and her partner Andy Foster, and was one of the few places in Cork city that would host punk bands. Butler had been the entertainments officer at University College Cork, and so the venue, which did not serve alcohol, became known as the 'Downtown Kampus'. Nun Attax drummer Keith "Smelly" O'Connell recalls the mid 1970s Cork scene being "very tame. When we came first, there was nothing like us around. It was all rock 'n' roll really, and Hot Guitars and band's like that. It was all just rock 'n' roll and the long hair and the beards."

The punk scene that developed in the late 1970's at the Arc was an important turning point for emerging Cork punk music; until then live music in the city had consisted mostly of Blues and pub rock bands. According to Mean Features guitarist Liam Heffernan, "the [emerging post-punk] scene was amazing....there was nothing else really in late Seventies and early Eighties Cork. Heavy industry was whacked. Elvera Butler brought some fantastic music to Cork. That woke us all up."

== Recording ==
The live event was held on 30 August 1980 using a mobile studio Butler borrowed from a studio in Belfast.

== Legacy ==
The 40th anniversary of the album's recording was commemorated in August 2020 by the placement of two large murals on Cork's Grand Parade. The installation is a collaboration with between Cork City Libraries and Cork City Council to mark the 40th anniversary of the recording of "Kaught at the Kampus". The artwork was produced by Fiona O'Mahony and Siobhan Bardsley, and consists of a panel containing a reproduction of the album cover, and a panel showing a full sized photograph of Five Goes Down to the Sea? as well as a reprint of a fanzine interview with that band.

The album was re-release in 2020, concurrent with a "Kaught at the Kampus" night at Cork City Library on 18 September of that year.

== Track listing ==
=== Side one ===
1. Nun Attax - "White Cortina"
2. Nun Attax - "Reekus Sunfare"
3. Nun Attax - "Eyeballs"

=== Side two ===
1. Mean Features - "Summer Holidays"
2. Urban Blitz - "Breakaway"
3. Microdisney - "National Anthem"

== Sources ==
- McAvoy, Mark (2009). Cork Rock: From Rory Gallagher to the Sultans of Ping. Cork: Mercier Press. ISBN 978-1-85635-655-8.
- McCarthy, Tony (20 July 2017). "U2 Agus An Arc". RTÉ One documentary.
- McDermott, Paul (25 April 2020). "The sounds of Finbarr Donnelly - Cork's cult hero remembered". RTÉ.
- McDermott, Paul (2001). Get That Monster Off The Stage (audio documentary). Raidió Teilifís Éireann.
- McDermott, Paul (2016). "The story of Finbarr Donnelly and his bands Nun Attax, Five Go Down To the Sea? and Beethoven". Medium.
- McGrath-Bryan, Mike (25 August 2020). "'Kaught at the Kampus' gig remembered 40 years later with Grand Parade mural". Irish Examiner.
- O'Dwyer, Sarah (26 August 2020). "Artwork marks Cork's post-punk scene". The Echo.
