= Reekus Records =

Irish record label

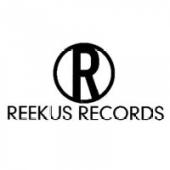
- Founded: 1981
- Founder: Elvera Butler
- Genre: Rock, indie, alternative rock, punk
- Country of origin: Ireland
- Location: Dublin, Ireland

Reekus Records is an Irish independent record label and publishing company based in Dublin, founded by Elvera Butler in 1981. The label specializes in the promotion of mostly Irish rock and alternative music.

The label has a discography that charts over three decades of Irish rock and alternative music. The company has released albums by leading Irish artists, including The Blades, David Hopkins, Perry Blake, Reemo, The Moondogs, Metisse, Big Self and performance artist Nigel Rolfe, as well launching the career of now established acts, such as Aslan and Microdisney.

Reekus Records is a member of the Irish Recorded Music Association (IRMA).

== History ==
=== 1980s: Kaught at the Kampus and the origins of Reekus ===
The creation of Reekus Records originated from Kaught at the Kampus, a vehicle for local Cork bands, whose central aim was to give support slots to acts at the Downtown Kampus, a club night in the Arcadia Ballroom. Kaught at the Kampus included tracks by Nun Attax, Microdisney, Mean Features and Urban Blitz. The album had been recorded on 30 August 1980.

Run by Reekus Records founder Elvera Butler, Downtown Kampus regularly hosted gigs with influential bands.

=== Early releases and the 1980s ===
During this period, Reekus set-up offices in Dublin and London. Notable releases during this period include The Blades' double A-side single, "The Bride Wore White" / "Animation" in 1982 (in the Hotpress National Poll, "The Bride Wore White" was voted best single of the year) and The Last Man In Europe.

=== 2000s ===
In 2001, the label released the solo album from The Blades' songwriter and frontman Paul Cleary, entitled Crooked Town. This was followed by re-releases of The Blades' albums Raytown Revisited and The Last Man In Europe on CD format. John Peel favourites, The Moondogs released Red Fish in 2003 (their first album in over twenty years), and in 2002 and 2007 respectively, Reekus released California and Canyon Songs, albums by Sligo-born songwriter Perry Blake.

Several new bands were added to the label's roster in this period: in October 2003, Saville released Somnambular Ballads, which led Hotpress to call them "one of the nation's favourite bands"; in 2005, Amber and Green by David Hopkins was released through Reekus; it was given 4.5/5 in Hotpress and made album of the week on the Larry Gogan Show on RTÉ 2fm. Reemo's debut, Colours, was described as "blistering" and "epic". Other well-received releases include Kaeleidoscope by Carosel, Blood Is Not Enough by Myp Et Jeep, Cash Is King by Mocrac, and Charm Offensive by The Radio, amongst many other albums, EPs and singles.

In 2003 Reekus moved into print with the publication of It Makes You Want To Spit - The Definitive Guide to Punk in Ulster. Because of the few venues and even fewer gigs around at the time of the Northern Irish Troubles, music fans embraced a punk, DIY aesthetic. The book was originally an 84-page fanzine, compiled and rewritten by Reekus Records.

Celebrating its 30-year anniversary, Reekus Records released the compilation Too Late To Stop Now in 2012.

== 2010s ==
In 2010 Reekus released the debut album from up-and-coming Dublin folk rockers Sweet Jane, Sugar For My Soul, which was called "beautiful... a cohesive record, one of intriguing atmosphere and stunning depth." The band have since changed their name to their current moniker Buffalo Sunn. In 2011, Cry Before Dawn released their comeback single, "Is This What You Waited For", through Reekus Records. In March 2013, featuring with Electro Sensitive Behaviour, Perry Blake released the single "Michael Caine". In mid-2011, Reekus Records curated an installment of Heineken and POD's Music Future's Bright featuring two bands on Reekus's roster, Sweet Jane and Saccade.

In 2014 Buffalo Sunn released their debut album By The Ocean By The Sea on Reekus Records. Produced by Pat McCarthy, the album debuted at #2 on the Irish indie charts, and #14 on the Irish charts. The album was received well by the Irish media, receiving 4 out of 5 stars from both The Irish Times and the Irish Daily Star.

== Reekus artists ==
=== Current roster ===
- The Blades
- Perry Blake
- Buffalo Sunn
- Cry Before Dawn
- Death in the Sickroom
- Keith Moss & The Tightrope Walkers
- Big Self
- David Hopkins
- The Moondogs
