= Day Tripper =

1965 single by the Beatles

- US picture sleeve

Single by the Beatles
- A-side: "We Can Work It Out" (double A-side)
- Released: 3 December 1965
- Recorded: 16 October 1965
- Studio: EMI, London
- Genre: Rock; pop rock
- Length: 2:50
- Label: Parlophone (UK); Capitol (US)
- Songwriter: Lennon–McCartney
- Producer: George Martin

The Beatles UK singles chronology
"Help!" (1965)	"Day Tripper" / "We Can Work It Out" (1965)	"Paperback Writer" (1966)

The Beatles US singles chronology
"Yesterday" (1965)	"Day Tripper" / "We Can Work It Out" (1965)	"Nowhere Man" (1966)

"Day Tripper" is a song by the English rock band the Beatles that was released as a double A-side single with "We Can Work It Out" in December 1965. The song was written primarily by John Lennon with some contributions from Paul McCartney and was credited to the Lennon–McCartney partnership. Both songs were recorded during the sessions for the band's Rubber Soul album. The single topped charts in Britain, Ireland, the Netherlands and Norway. In the United States, "Day Tripper" peaked at number five on the Billboard Hot 100 chart and "We Can Work It Out" held the top position.

"Day Tripper" is a rock song based around an electric guitar riff and drawing on the influence of American soul music. The Beatles included it in their concert setlists until their retirement from live performances in late August 1966.

In the UK, "We Can Work It Out" / "Day Tripper" was the seventh highest selling single of the 1960s, and the Christmas number one of 1965. As of December 2018, it was the 54th best-selling single of all time in the UK – one of six Beatles singles included in the top sales rankings published by the Official Charts Company.

== Background and inspiration ==
"Day Tripper" was written early in the Rubber Soul sessions when the Beatles were under pressure to produce a new single for the Christmas market. John Lennon wrote the music and most of the lyrics, while Paul McCartney contributed some of the lyrics. Lennon based the song's guitar riff on that from Bobby Parker's "Watch Your Step", which had also been his model for "I Feel Fine" in 1964. In a 1980 interview, Lennon said of "Day Tripper": "That's mine. Including the lick, the guitar break and the whole bit." In the 1997 book Paul McCartney: Many Years from Now, McCartney claims that it was a collaboration but Lennon deserved "the main credit".

Lennon described "Day Tripper" as a "drug song" in 1970, and in a 2004 interview McCartney said it was "about acid". The song title is a play on words referring to both a tourist on a day-trip and a "trip" in the sense of a psychedelic experience. Lennon recalled: "Day trippers are people who go on a day trip, right? Usually on a ferryboat or something. But [the song] was kind of ... 'you're just a weekend hippie.' Get it?" In Many Years from Now, McCartney says that "Day Tripper" was about sex and drugs; he describes it as "a tongue-in-cheek song about someone who was ... committed only in part to the idea. Whereas we saw ourselves as full-time trippers ..."

During the sessions for Rubber Soul, a rift was growing between McCartney and his bandmates as he continued to abstain from taking LSD. After Lennon and George Harrison had first taken the drug in London early in 1965, Ringo Starr had joined them for their second experience, which took place in Los Angeles when the Beatles stopped there during their August 1965 US tour. Given McCartney's continued abstinence from the drug, author Ian MacDonald says that the song's lyrics may well have been partly directed at him, a perspective shared by music journalist Keith Cameron.

When writing and recording their new songs, the Beatles drew on their experiences from the recent US tour. Throughout the summer, soul music had been one of the dominant sounds heard on American radio, particularly singles by acts signed to the Motown and Stax labels. Author Jon Savage writes that in the British pop scene of late 1965, American soul music was "everywhere", and the Beatles readily embraced the genre in both "Day Tripper" and the Rubber Soul track "Drive My Car". (Note: In a 1966 press conference, Starr said they called the album Rubber Soul to acknowledge that, in comparison to American soul artists, "we are white and haven't got what they've got". He added that this was true of all the British acts who attempted to play soul music.) According to MacDonald, Lennon possibly came up with the riff in an effort to improve on the Rolling Stones' 1965 hit single "(I Can't Get No) Satisfaction", which similarly showed the influence of Stax.

== Composition ==
=== Guitar riff ===
Main guitar riff

The main compositional feature of "Day Tripper" is its two-bar, single-chord guitar riff. The riff opens and closes the song, and forms the basis of the verses. In addition, the pattern is transposed to the IV chord during the verses and to the V chord for the bridge.

In musicologist Alan Pollack's description:

[The] riff has both the overall shape of a non-symmetrical rising arch whose descent does not completely balance out its ascent, yet it makes an impression of upward bound saw-tooth angularity; note particularly the way it drops a full octave in the space of a single eighth note whenever it repeats. Harmonically it outlines a bluesy I9 chord (with the flat seventh!). Rhythmically, it places hard syncopations on the eighth note preceding both the first and third beat of the second measure, while its final three eighth notes provide momentum that effectively leads into the repeat.

Musicologist Walter Everett highlights the riff as an example of the Beatles drawing inspiration from other artists and improving on the source material. He sees the "Day Tripper" riff as a combination of the ostinatis heard on Motown recordings such as the Temptations' "My Girl", Barrett Strong's "Money (That's What I Want)" (which the Beatles had previously covered) and Marvin Gaye's "I'll Be Doggone", while also incorporating a rockabilly element that recalls Roy Orbison's "Oh, Pretty Woman".

=== Musical structure ===
The song is in common time throughout and the home key is E major. It opens with the riff played in unison on lead and rhythm guitar, followed by a staggered entrance of bass guitar, tambourine and finally drums. After this extended intro, the song's structure comprises two verses, a bridge that serves as an instrumental break, then a final verse, and the outro.

The verse adheres to the twelve-bar blues form for eight bars, with a change to the IV chord followed by the expected return to I. The chorus portion of the verse then departs from the form by moving to the parallel major version of the home key's relative minor. As throughout the song, only major chords are used in this portion: F♯7 for four bars, and one bar each of A7, G♯7, C♯7 and B7.

The bridge remains on the B chord for its entirety and takes the form of a "rave-up". The section begins with repetitions of the main riff and ends with a blues-inflected guitar solo accompanied by wordless harmony singing. A 12-note rising guitar scale sounds on the second beat of each bar, starting with a mid-range B note and climbing over an octave to F♯. In Everett's view, the intensity of the bridge – created by the bass pedal point, rising scale, guitar solos, cymbal playing, and increased attack on the vocalised "aah"s – conveys the realisation that the singer is being used by the day-tripper and "express a gradually-arising, yet sudden sensation of, enlightenment".

=== Vocal line and lyrics ===
"Day Tripper" follows a strand of Lennon's writing style in which the lyrics put down a woman who claims to be more than what she delivers, a theme commonly found in rhythm and blues and blues songs. In the description of music critic Tim Riley, the song is about "being awakened and jilted all at once", as best conveyed in the singer's declaration that "It took me so long to find out". The line "She's a big teaser" was a code for "She's a prick teaser."

The vocal line over the verses contrasts with the flowing and circular quality of the main riff by including downward and abrupt phrasing. Pollack cites this aspect as an example of the composition's manipulation of harmonic rhythm. He also highlights the judicious use of falsetto and change of wording in the final chorus – where the day tripper's "one-way ticket" becomes a reference to her as a "Sunday driver" – as examples of the song's avoidance of "rote consistency" and its ability to continually surprise. (Note: Everett writes that following the climactic bridge, the vocal line in the third verse is altered "just enough to express a renewed exasperation" with the protagonist.) In music journalist Paul Du Noyer's view, the song reveals "multiple layers in play". He cites "the triple implication of 'day tripper' as flighty girlfriend, or weekend hop-head, or uncommitted disciple of the new wisdom", adding that the ascending wordless vocalisation in the bridge serves as a "self-reference to that defining Beatle moment" in their 1963 cover of "Twist and Shout".

== Recording ==
The Beatles recorded the song at their first session after completing "Drive My Car". The session took place at EMI Studios (now Abbey Road Studios) in London on 16 October 1965. Unusually for the time, the group allowed visitors into the studio, as Lennon's wife Cynthia and his half-sisters Julia Baird and Jacqui Dykins attended part of the session. The band rehearsed the song for much of the afternoon before taping the basic track. (Note: Baird later recalled her surprise at hearing the completed song, saying: "It seemed like lots of bits and pieces were being put together and I can't understand how they got the final version out of what I heard.") The line-up was Lennon and Harrison on rhythm and lead guitar respectively, McCartney on bass guitar and Starr on drums.

Take 3 was selected for overdubs, having been the only take in which the performance did not break down. On the studio tapes from the session, Starr can be heard encouraging his bandmates to "really rock it this time" before take 1. MacDonald describes Starr's drumming over the choruses as "another in-joke", further to the Beatles' channelling of the Stax sound on "Drive My Car", as his reversion to fours on the bass drum recalls Al Jackson's playing with Booker T. & the M.G.'s.

Lennon and McCartney overdubbed lead vocals, with McCartney the more prominent singer in the verses' first and third lines, and Harrison added a harmony vocal over the choruses and the instrumental bridge. Starr overdubbed the tambourine.

Music journalist Rob Chapman views the guitar interplay on "Day Tripper" as an example of the Beatles' "baroque sonata" approach to musical arrangements. (Note: In Pollack's opinion, the completed track is "by virtue of its handling of harmonic rhythm, ostinato guitar riff, and subtle textures in scoring ... remarkably instrumental, even orchestral in gesture for a 'pop song'".) Harrison played the bridge's rising scale using a guitar volume-pedal effect, and overdubbed a second lead guitar part over the same section. Everett, Riley and authors Jean-Michel Guesdon and Philippe Margotin say that Harrison played the blues solo, while MacDonald credits Lennon. After completing the song late that evening, the band recorded the basic track for "If I Needed Someone" in a single take.

== A-side status and promotional clips ==
"Day Tripper" had been conceived as the A-side of the Beatles' next single but the band came to favour "We Can Work It Out", which was predominantly written by McCartney and recorded later in the Rubber Soul sessions. Lennon continued to argue for "Day Tripper". To promote the upcoming release, the Beatles filmed mimed performances of the two songs on 1–2 November for inclusion in the Granada TV special The Music of Lennon & McCartney. At the start of "Day Tripper", the band were accompanied by a group of go-go dancers.

On 15 November, EMI announced that the A-side would be "We Can Work It Out", only for Lennon to publicly contradict this two days later. As a compromise, the single was marketed as a double A-side. (Note: Several sources state that this double A-side single was the first of its kind in the UK. The double A-side single "Evil Hearted You" / "Still I'm Sad", released in October 1965 by the Yardbirds, reached number three on the Record Retailer Chart.) Lennon's championing of "Day Tripper" was based on his belief that the Beatles' rock sound should be favoured over the softer style of "We Can Work It Out". (Note: In author Nicholas Schaffner's description, the band generally embraced a "mellower, lower-voltage" aesthetic on Rubber Soul, and "Day Tripper" was the only track that "really attained a raw rock 'n' roll sound".)

Further to the Granada filming, the Beatles decided to promote the single solely through pre-recorded film clips for the first time. On 23 November, they filmed three black-and-white promotional clips for each of the songs at Twickenham Film Studios in south-west London. The clips were designed to be sent to various television music and variety shows around the world, to air on those programmes in lieu of personal studio appearances. Directed by Joe McGrath and later known collectively as the "Intertel Promos", the filming also included mimed performances of "I Feel Fine", "Ticket to Ride" and "Help!" for inclusion in Top of the Pops' round-up of the biggest hits of 1965.

Ringo Starr (right) sawing though the studio scenery in one of the promo clips for the song

As with the other clips, the promos for "Day Tripper" showed the Beatles making minimal effort to appear as though they were performing the song. In the first clip, the band members are dressed in black and perform on a stage in front of shiny pillars. Following the song's bridge, Starr marches rather than plays, seated at his drum kit.

For the second promo, they wore their military-style jackets from their August 1965 concert at New York's Shea Stadium. Surrounded by travel-themed props, they perform in front of a backdrop of tinsel and a New Year's greeting in French. Lennon and McCartney stand behind an aeroplane, while Harrison and Starr play through the windows of a railway carriage. With no drum kit visible, Starr discards his drumsticks in favour of a saw and begins sawing through the carriage. In music critic Richie Unterberger's view, Starr's antics lend the performance "a dash of surrealism (by 1965 pop group standards at any rate)".

== Release and reception ==
The single was released on EMI's Parlophone label in Britain (as Parlophone R 5389) on 3 December 1965, the same day as Rubber Soul. On the front page of its issue published the previous day, Melody Maker confirmed the release dates as well as the dates for the promos' airing on British TV and for the band's UK tour; the editors called the week ahead "National Beatles Week". In the United States, Capitol Records issued the single on 6 December (as Capitol 5555).

The release coincided with speculation in the UK press that the Beatles' superiority in the pop world since 1963 might be coming to an end, given the customary two or three years that most acts could expect to remain at the peak of their popularity. In addition, after receiving their MBEs for services to the national economy in October, the group were temporarily perceived as being part of the establishment. Cash Box's reviewer predicted that the Beatles would "quickly trip the [US] charts fantastic for the umpteenth time" with "We Can Work It Out" and described "Day Tripper" as a "hard-pounding, raunchy ode all about a gal who is somewhat of a tease". Derek Johnson of the NME said that "Day Tripper" "generates plenty of excitement" but it was "not one of the boys' strongest melodically", and "the other side is much more startling in conception." In his role as guest reviewer for Melody Maker, the Animals' Eric Burdon said he preferred "Day Tripper" and especially admired Harrison's guitar contributions, saying that rather than musical prowess, "It's what he does and when he does it." Burdon also wrote: "It's fantastic that every Beatles record that comes out gets knocked, then two or three days after everybody likes it. But I like this immediately."

"We Can Work It Out" / "Day Tripper" entered the UK Singles Chart (at the time, the Record Retailer chart) on 15 December, at number 2. Although three singles had previously entered at number one, (Note: These were "Jailhouse Rock" in 1958 and "It's Now Or Never" in 1960 by Elvis Presley, alongside "The Young Ones" by Cliff Richard and the Shadows in 1962.) "We Can Work It Out" / "Day Tripper" was the first ever UK Singles Chart debut at number 2. It would then hold the top position for five consecutive weeks. The single also failed to top the national chart published by Melody Maker in its first week – marking the first occasion since December 1963 that a new Beatles single had not immediately entered at number 1. Although it was an immediate number 1 on the NME's chart, the Daily Mirror and Daily Express newspapers both published articles highlighting the apparent decline. (Note: When asked by the Express whether this marked a "change in Beatlemania", Harrison attributed it to the unusual practice of marketing two songs instead of one.)

The record was the Beatles' ninth consecutive chart-topping single in Record Retailer and their tenth on the country's other charts, and for the third year in succession they had the Christmas number 1 hit as well as the top-selling album. "We Can Work It Out" / "Day Tripper" was also the band's fastest-selling single in the UK since "Can't Buy Me Love" in 1964. Alan Smith, the reporter assigned to cover the Beatles' UK tour for the NME, commented: "Anyone who says they're finished – particularly with 'Day Tripper' / 'We Can Work It Out' at No. 1 in the NME Chart in its first week – must be out of his head!" (Note: In his appreciation of the Beatles for Melody Maker before the single's release, Mike Hennessey wrote: "Their success is so completely without parallel that it always amuses me to see such and such a group rated as 'second only to the Beatles'. It's like saying brass is second only to gold. Even more fanciful are the popular press references to the Beatles being 'knocked off the No. 1 spot'. Nobody has ever knocked the Beatles off the No. 1 spot – they're way out of reach.")

In the US, both songs entered the Billboard Hot 100 on the week ending 18 December. In early 1966, "We Can Work It Out" spent three non-consecutive weeks at number 1, while "Day Tripper" peaked at number 5. The single was certified gold by the Recording Industry Association of America, for sales of 1 million or over, on 6 January. The record topped charts in many other countries around the world, although "We Can Work It Out" was usually the favoured side. (Note: In West Germany, the song's airplay was restricted due to concerns that "tripper" sounded like the German word for gonorrhea.)

== Live performances ==
The Beatles included "Day Tripper" in the set list for their December 1965 UK tour. They continued to perform it live throughout 1966. When they played it at Cleveland's Municipal Stadium on 14 August, the song triggered a crowd invasion that some commentators likened to the race riots that had recently taken place in the east of Cleveland. Over 2,000 fans broke through the security barriers separating the audience from the open area housing the elevated stage, causing the Beatles to stop the performance and shelter backstage for half an hour until order was restored. The song prompted a similar response when the group returned to Shea Stadium on 23 August.

During the band's final press conference as a performing act, held at the Capitol Records Building in Los Angeles on 28 August, a reporter asked them what they thought of Time magazine's recent dismissal of pop music, particularly the writers' contention that "Day Tripper" was about a prostitute and "Norwegian Wood" was about a lesbian. McCartney joked that "We were just trying to write songs about prostitutes and lesbians, that's all." (Note: As the reporters broke into laughter, Lennon interjected: "Quipped Ringo.") When introducing the song at San Francisco's Candlestick Park the following night, during the band's final commercial concert, Lennon described it as being "about the very naughty lady called Day Tripper".

McCartney included the song in his tour set list from 2009 to 2012. A live version appears on his 2009 live album Good Evening New York City.

== Subsequent releases and mixes ==
In June 1966, "Day Tripper" was included on Yesterday and Today, an album configured by Capitol for the North American market. In November that year, a new stereo mix was created for the EMI compilation A Collection of Beatles Oldies. "Day Tripper" later appeared on the band's 1962–1966 compilation, released in 1973. CD versions of that album used the November 1966 remix, as did the Past Masters, Volume Two compilation, released in 1988.

Whereas in the 1965 stereo mix, one of the guitars is inaudible for the first couple of seconds of the intro, the remix has both guitars entering from the start. The 1966 stereo mix also adds extra reverb on the vocals and edits out a stray "yeah" from Lennon at the start of the coda. The 1965 and 1966 mixes contain some audible engineering errors. Drop-outs occur in the track containing lead guitar and tambourine early in the third verse (after the line "Tried to please her") and in the coda. Riley comments on the significance of the first error, saying that "technical flaws are so rare on a Beatles recording that its inclusion is strange." (Note: In addition, McCartney's bass loses the rhythm of the riff before breaking into improvisation in the coda. According to Everett, producer George Martin most likely overlooked the engineer's mistakes because they were largely concealed in mono, which was the only mix required for the single's release.) The drop-outs were fixed for the release of the 2000 compilation 1, by copying the required sounds from another point in the song.

One of the November 1965 promotional clips was included in the Beatles' 2015 video compilation 1, and two appear in the three-disc versions of the compilation, titled 1+. The mimed performance from The Music of Lennon & McCartney was also included on 1+.

== Impact and legacy ==
The success of "We Can Work It Out" / "Day Tripper" popularised the double A-side format and, in giving equal treatment to two songs, allowed recording artists to show their versatility. The Beatles' decision to send out independently produced films to promote their music anticipated the modern music video and the rise of MTV in the 1980s. According to music journalist Robert Fontenot, "Since these performances [of 'Day Tripper' and 'We Can Work It Out'] were not filmed in front of an audience, they can be considered the world's first music videos as we understand the format today."

According to author and musician John Kruth, the guitar riff on "Day Tripper" was a part that every young guitarist in the UK and the US "had to learn". Lenny Kaye, an aspiring musician in 1965, later described it as one of the era's "great riffs" and highlighted the song as an example of how the Beatles' music was always harder to master than that of contemporaries such as the Rolling Stones and the Yardbirds. The song's use of an octave-doubled guitar riff anticipated a characteristic of Cream and Led Zeppelin later in the 1960s, particularly in their respective songs "Sunshine of Your Love" and "Good Times Bad Times" and "Heartbreaker". (Note: Everett also views the rising scale and sustained harmony vocals in "Day Tripper"'s middle eight as a precedent for the organ passage heard in the Animals' 1966 single "Don't Bring Me Down".) Lennon said that McCartney's riff-driven "Paperback Writer", the A-side of the Beatles' May 1966 single, was "son of 'Day Tripper'".

"Day Tripper" is one of the very best pure rock 'n' roll songs the Beatles ever created. Its opening guitar riff is one of the most distinctive in rock, a sleek powerhouse of compressed energy that gets better with each listening. A groove this natural doesn't need much ornamentation, but the Beatles nevertheless chose to build in a climax after the second verse that propels the song to breathtaking heights.

— Author Mark Hertsgaard

Although Lennon expressed dissatisfaction with the song, it has remained popular with critics and fans. Dave Marsh described "Day Tripper" as the most authentic approximation of a genuine soul recording the Beatles had yet made. Tim Riley deems it "Lennon's guitar heaven", with a mid-song "rave-up to end all rave-ups" and a "brilliant yet coolly irreverent" riff. He also admires Starr's drumming, particularly over the coda, saying that it serves as one of "Ringo's finest moments" on record. Less impressed, Ian MacDonald says the track suggests that wit in the form of musical jokes had become the band's "new gimmick". He considers it to be "Musically uninspired by The Beatles' standards" and marred by the engineering error in the third verse. Alex Petridis of The Guardian finds the song inferior to "We Can Work It Out", writing: "Its addictive riff aside, there is something unappealingly snooty about Day Tripper: the sound of an acid initiate sneering at someone insufficiently hip to have turned on, tuned in and dropped out."

"Day Tripper" was one of the "Treasure Island" singles listed in Greil Marcus's 1979 book Stranded. It was also included in Marsh's 1989 book The 1001 Greatest Singles Ever Made, ranked at number 382, and in Paul Williams' 1993 book Rock and Roll: The 100 Best Singles of All Time at 37th. The NME ranked it at number 25 in the magazine's list of "The Top 100 Singles of All Time" in 1976, and Mojo ranked it 62nd in a similar list compiled in 1997.

In 2010, Rolling Stone ranked "Day Tripper" 39th in its list of "The 100 Greatest Beatles Songs". In Mojo's list, published in 2006, the track appeared at number 74, a ranking that Keith Cameron bemoaned as too low in his commentary for the magazine. He said it was the most riff-oriented of all the Beatles' songs and praised the group's performance, highlighting Lennon and McCartney's "finest tag vocal melodrama", Starr's effective drum rolls, and Harrison's ascending sequence over the middle eight for "lur[ing] us to the verge of hysteria". (Note: Cameron also commented on the significance of McCartney's "throaty gusto" when singing the verses, saying that despite the probability that Lennon's lyric was aimed at him, the musical empathy within the band in 1965 ensured "uniformly formidable" contributions from all four members.) "Day Tripper" was ranked the 30th best Beatles song by Ultimate Classic Rock in 2014 and by the music staff of Time Out London in 2017.

By November 2012, the single had sold 1.39 million copies in the UK, making it the group's fifth million-seller in that country. As of December 2018, the double A-side was the 54th best-selling single of all time in the UK – one of six Beatles entries in the top sales rankings published by the Official Charts Company.

== Cover versions and musical references ==
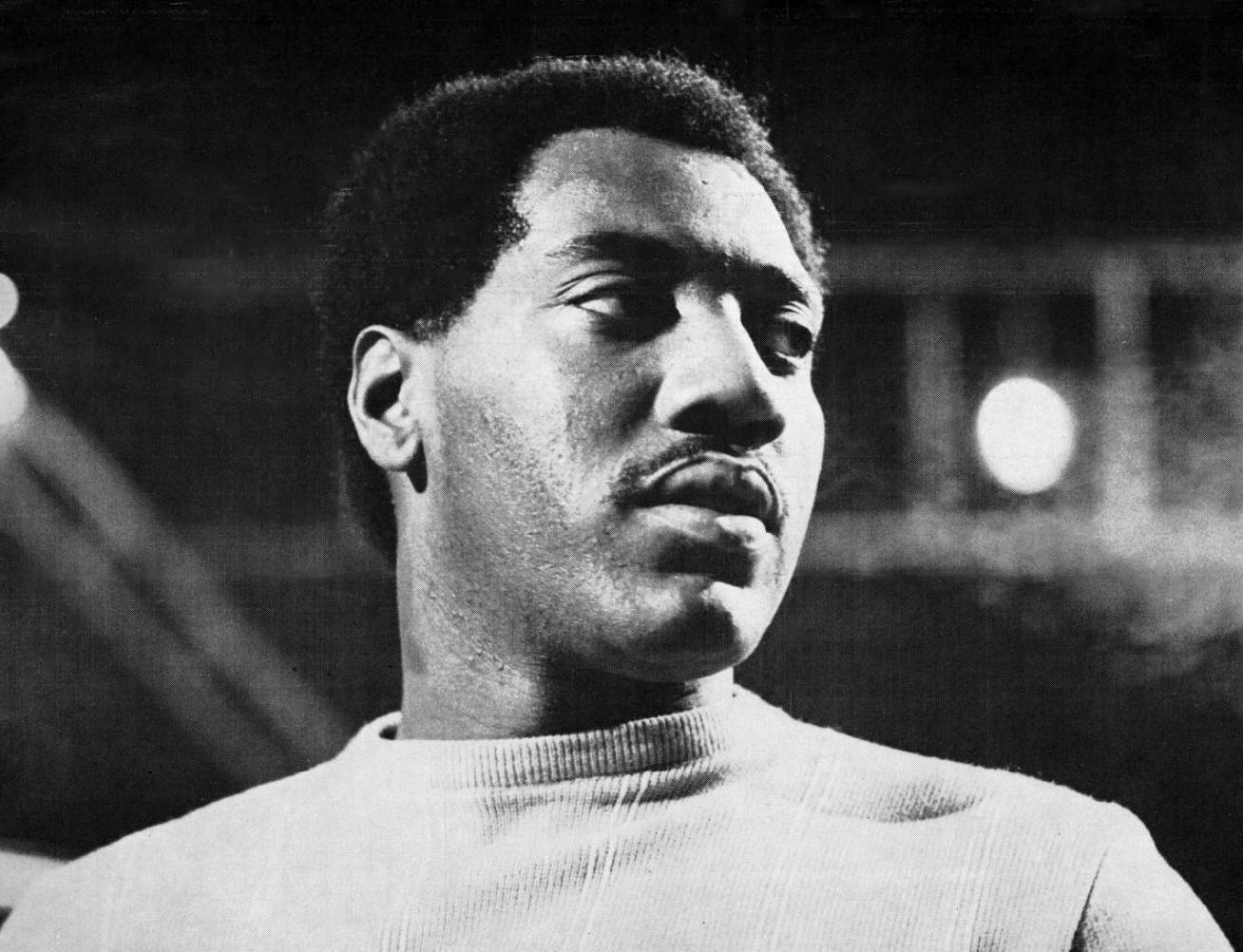
Otis Redding recorded the song for Stax Records in 1966.

In 1966, the song was covered by Otis Redding, whose version peaked at number 43 on the Record Retailer chart in 1967. According to MacDonald, Redding was delighted by the Beatles' imitation of his sound in "Drive My Car" and responded by recording "his own, madly up-tempo" arrangement of "Day Tripper". Jon Savage cites Redding's covers of "Day Tripper" and the Rolling Stones' "(I Can't Get No) Satisfaction" as part of a trend by Stax artists and other African-American soul musicians that acknowledged the Beatles, the Rolling Stones and Bob Dylan but was "also an assertion of pop equality – 'We're just as good as you.'" (Note: Another example, according to Savage, was J.J. Barnes's "stomping version" of "Day Tripper", released on Motown-owned Ric-Tic Records.) Having backed Redding on his cover, as the Stax house band, Booker T. & the M.G.'s also recorded the song for the label.

Kruth highlights Mae West's 1966 version, on Way Out West, for its sexual suggestiveness as she transposes the lyrics into a first-person perspective, singing "I'm a big teaser / I took him half the way there", and includes a "sizzling striptease groove" in the musical backing. According to Kruth, Nancy Sinatra provided another "hot" female reading on her album Boots, which also includes a provocative interpretation of the Rubber Soul track "Run for Your Life". Richie Unterberger pairs Jimi Hendrix with Redding as the major artists who realised "the inherent soulfulness of 'Day Tripper'" in their cover recordings. Described by Kruth as "red-hot", Hendrix's version was recorded for BBC Radio in 1967 and subsequently issued on his 1998 album BBC Sessions.

Lennon was indifferent about Redding's version; in his 1968 Rolling Stone interview, Lennon said he especially liked José Feliciano's recording of the song. "Day Tripper" was the lead track on the Irish band Beethoven's 1989 Him Goolie Goolie Man, Dem EP. Steven Wells of the NME named the record "Single of the Week", writing that "The centrestone of this jewel of a record is the kidnapping, tarring and feathering, mugging, shagging and destruction of 'Day Tripper'." (Note: Kruth also highlights recordings by the bands Cheap Trick and Bad Brains, the last of whom released a "punky reggae" live version that segues into the Rolling Stones' "She's a Rainbow". Other artists who have covered "Day Tripper" include Herbie Mann, Lulu, Spirit, Sergio Mendes and Brasil '66, Anne Murray, James Taylor, Type O Negative, Sham 69, Whitesnake, Mongo Santamaría, Ian Hunter, Brinsley Schwarz, Ramsey Lewis, ELO, the Flamin' Groovies, Julian Lennon, Domingo Quiñones, Ricky Martin and Ocean Colour Scene.) Japanese synth-pop band Yellow Magic Orchestra included a cover of "Day Tripper" on their 1979 album Solid State Survivor.

Pauline Oliveros's tape-delay collage piece "Rock Symphony", which she debuted at the San Francisco Tape Music Center in December 1965, used samples of "Day Tripper" and "Norwegian Wood", along with recent recordings by the Animals, the Bobby Fuller Four and Tammi Terrell. Rob Chapman cites this composition as an example of mid-1960s avant-garde composers being quick to incorporate pop into their work, thereby expanding the scope of their medium.

Eric Clapton included the riff from "Day Tripper" in the cover version of Ray Charles' "What'd I Say" on the 1966 John Mayall & the Bluesbreakers album Blues Breakers with Eric Clapton. That same year, Buffalo Springfield included the riff in "Baby Don't Scold Me", a track available on the original pressing of the band's debut album, Buffalo Springfield. Yes used it in the introduction to their 1969 cover of the Beatles' "Every Little Thing". April Wine also used the riff, along with that of the Stones' "Satisfaction", at the end of their 1979 song "I Like to Rock".

== Personnel ==
According to Ian MacDonald:

- John Lennon – double-tracked lead vocal, rhythm/lead guitar
- Paul McCartney – double-tracked lead vocal, bass guitar
- George Harrison – lead guitar, harmony vocal
- Ringo Starr – drums, tambourine

== Charts ==
Chart (1965–1966)	Peak position
Belgian Walloon Singles	12
Dutch MegaChart Singles	1
Finland (Suomen virallinen lista)	1
Irish Singles Chart	1
Italian M&D Singles Chart	7
New Zealand Listener Chart	8
Norwegian VG-lista Singles	1
Swedish Kvällstoppen Chart	1
UK Record Retailer Chart	1
US Billboard Hot 100	5
US Cash Box Top 100	10

== Certifications ==
Region	Certification	Certified units/sales
New Zealand (RMNZ)	Gold	15,000^{‡}
United Kingdom (BPI)	Silver	200,000^{‡}
^{‡} Sales+streaming figures based on certification alone.

== Sources ==
- Castleman, Harry; Podrazik, Walter J. (1976). All Together Now: The First Complete Beatles Discography 1961–1975. New York, NY: Ballantine Books. ISBN 0-345-25680-8.
- Chapman, Rob (2015). Psychedelia and Other Colours. London: Faber & Faber. ISBN 978-0-571-28200-5.
- Davies, Hunter (2016). The Beatles Book. London: Ebury Press. ISBN 978-0091958619.
- Einarson, John (2004). For What It's Worth: The Story of Buffalo Springfield. Lanham, MD: Cooper Square Press. ISBN 978-0-81541281-6.
- Everett, Walter (2001). The Beatles as Musicians: The Quarry Men through Rubber Soul. New York, NY: Oxford University Press. ISBN 0-19-514105-9.
- Gould, Jonathan (2007). Can't Buy Me Love: The Beatles, Britain and America. London: Piatkus. ISBN 978-0-7499-2988-6.
- Guesdon, Jean-Michel; Margotin, Philippe (2013). All the Songs: The Story Behind Every Beatles Release. New York, NY: Black Dog & Leventhal. ISBN 978-1-57912-952-1.
- Hertsgaard, Mark (1996). A Day in the Life: The Music and Artistry of the Beatles. London: Pan Books. ISBN 0-330-33891-9.
- Ingham, Chris (2006). The Rough Guide to the Beatles. London: Rough Guides. ISBN 978-1-84353-720-5.
- Jackson, Andrew Grant (2015). 1965: The Most Revolutionary Year in Music. New York, NY: Thomas Dunne Books. ISBN 978-1-250-05962-8.
- Kruth, John (2015). This Bird Has Flown: The Enduring Beauty of Rubber Soul, Fifty Years On. Milwaukee, WI: Backbeat Books. ISBN 978-1-61713-573-6.
- Lewisohn, Mark (2005) [1988]. The Complete Beatles Recording Sessions: The Official Story of the Abbey Road Years 1962–1970. London: Bounty Books. ISBN 978-0-7537-2545-0.
- MacDonald, Ian (1998). Revolution in the Head: The Beatles' Records and the Sixties. London: Pimlico. ISBN 978-0-7126-6697-8.
- Miles, Barry (1997). Paul McCartney: Many Years from Now. New York, NY: Henry Holt & Company. ISBN 0-8050-5249-6.
- Miles, Barry (2001). The Beatles Diary Volume 1: The Beatles Years. London: Omnibus Press. ISBN 0-7119-8308-9.
- Mojo Special Limited Edition: 1000 Days That Shook the World (The Psychedelic Beatles – April 1, 1965 to December 26, 1967). London: Emap. 2002.
- Riley, Tim (2002) [1988]. Tell Me Why – The Beatles: Album by Album, Song by Song, the Sixties and After. Cambridge, MA: Da Capo Press. ISBN 978-0-306-81120-3.
- Rodriguez, Robert (2012). Revolver: How the Beatles Reimagined Rock 'n' Roll. Milwaukee, WI: Backbeat Books. ISBN 978-1-61713-009-0.
- Savage, Jon (2015). 1966: The Year the Decade Exploded. London: Faber & Faber. ISBN 978-0-571-27763-6.
- Russo, Greg (2016). Yardbirds: The Ultimate Rave-Up. Floral Park, New York: Crossfire Publications. ISBN 978-0-9791845-7-4.
- Schaffner, Nicholas (1978). The Beatles Forever. New York, NY: McGraw-Hill. ISBN 0-07-055087-5.
- Sheff, David (2000) [1981]. All We Are Saying: The Last Major Interview with John Lennon and Yoko Ono. New York: St. Martin's Press. ISBN 0-312-25464-4.
- Sounes, Howard (2010). Fab: An Intimate Life of Paul McCartney. London: HarperCollins. ISBN 978-0-00-723705-0.
- Sullivan, Steve (2017). Encyclopedia of Great Popular Song Recordings, Volumes 3 & 4. Lanham, MD: Rowman & Littlefield. ISBN 978-1-4422-5448-0.
- Sutherland, Steve, ed. (2003). NME Originals: Lennon. London: IPC Ignite!.
- Turner, Steve (2016). Beatles '66: The Revolutionary Year. New York, NY: Ecco. ISBN 978-0-06-247558-9.
- Unterberger, Richie (2006). The Unreleased Beatles: Music & Film. San Francisco, CA: Backbeat Books. ISBN 978-0-87930-892-6.
- Winn, John C. (2008). Way Beyond Compare: The Beatles' Recorded Legacy, Volume One, 1962–1965. New York, NY: Three Rivers Press. ISBN 978-0-3074-5239-9.
- Womack, Kenneth (2014). The Beatles Encyclopedia: Everything Fab Four. Santa Barbara, CA: ABC-CLIO. ISBN 978-0-313-39171-2.
