= David Cavanagh =

Irish writer

David Cavanagh was an Irish writer and music journalist who was the editor of Select magazine in the 1990s. He books include My Magpie Eyes Are Hungry for the Prize (2000), which detailed the rise and fall of Creation Records, and Good Night and Good Riddance: How Thirty-Five Years of John Peel Helped to Shape Modern Life, about John Peel.

Cavanagh was born in Dublin on 7 December 1964 and grew up in Northern Ireland. During his career, he wrote for Sounds, Select, Q, Uncut and Mojo.

He died by suicide in Luton on 27 December 2018, aged 54.

== Books by Cavanagh ==
- The World's Greatest Rock 'n' Roll Scandals. Bounty, 1989. ISBN 978-1851528691.
- Love Is the Drug. Penguin, 1994. Edited by John Aizlewood. ISBN 978-0-1402-4199-0.
- The Creation Records Story: My Magpie Eyes are Hungry for the Prize. Virgin, 2001. ISBN 978-0-7535-0645-5.
- Music for Boys. Fourth Estate, 2003. ISBN 978-0-0071-487-21.
- 1000 Songs to Change Your Life. Time Out, 2008. Edited by Will Fulford-Jones and John Lewis. ISBN 978-1-8467-0082-8.
- Good Night and Good Riddance: How Thirty-Five Years of John Peel Helped to Shape Modern Life. Faber & Faber, 2015. ISBN 978-0-5713-0247-5.
