= Conway Street =

Thoroughfare in Camden, London

Coordinates: 51°31′19.59″N 0°8′23.4″W

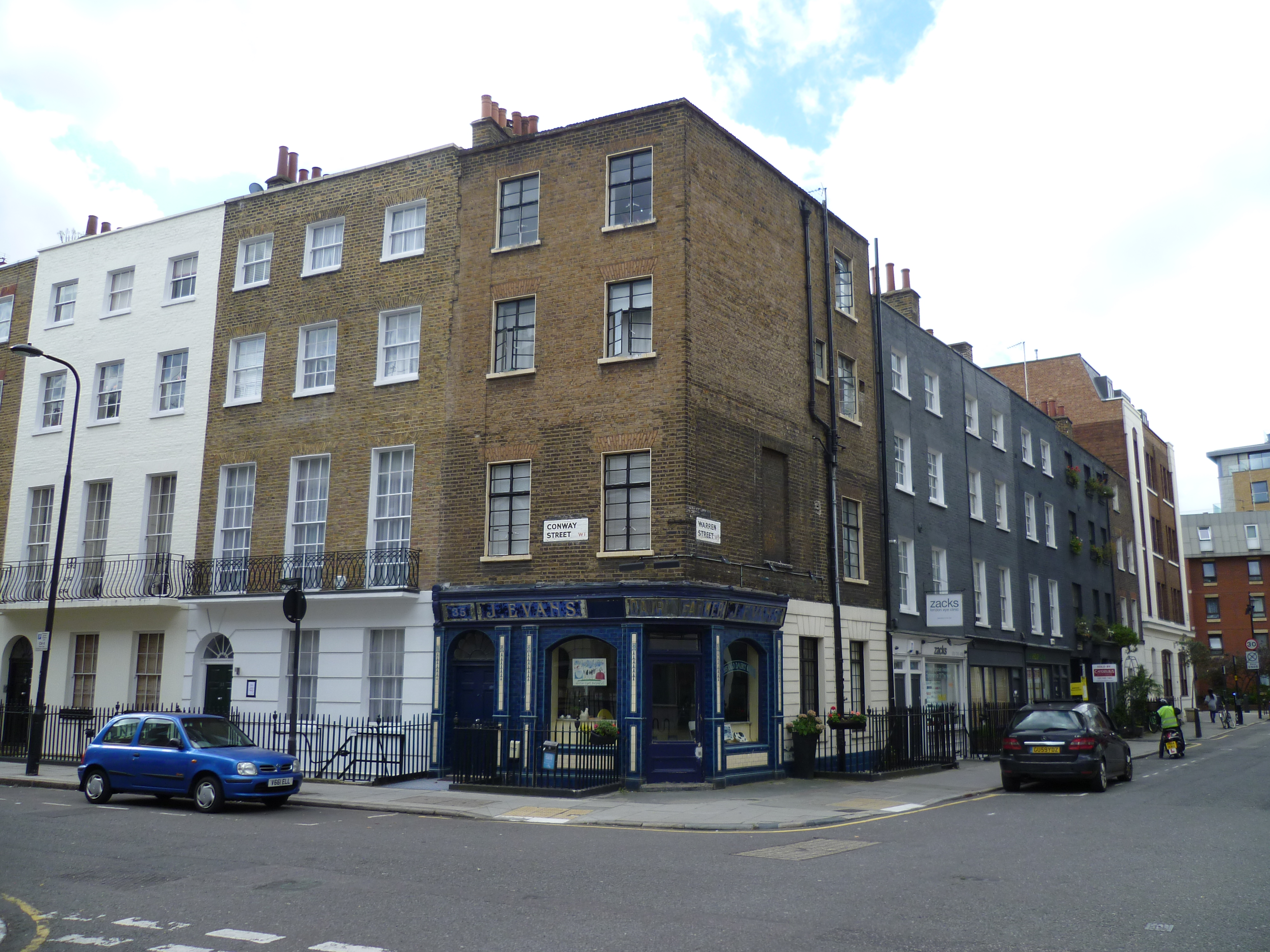
The corner of Conway Street and Warren Street

Conway Street is a street in the London Borough of Camden that runs from the Euston Road in the north to Maple Street in the south, being divided in the middle by Fitzroy Square in the south. The northern part of the street is crossed only by Warren Street.

Originally named Conway Street Upper and Lower, it was renamed as Southampton Street, and later returned to the name Conway Street, without the distinction of Upper and Lower, and with the houses numbered consecutively from south to north, with Fitzroy Square intervening.

William Heysham Overend (1851–1898), the noted marine artist and illustrator lived at No. 17 from 1893 until his death in 1898. At that time the street was known as Southampton Street. (Note: Charles FitzRoy, 1st Baron Southampton, developed Fitzroy Square)

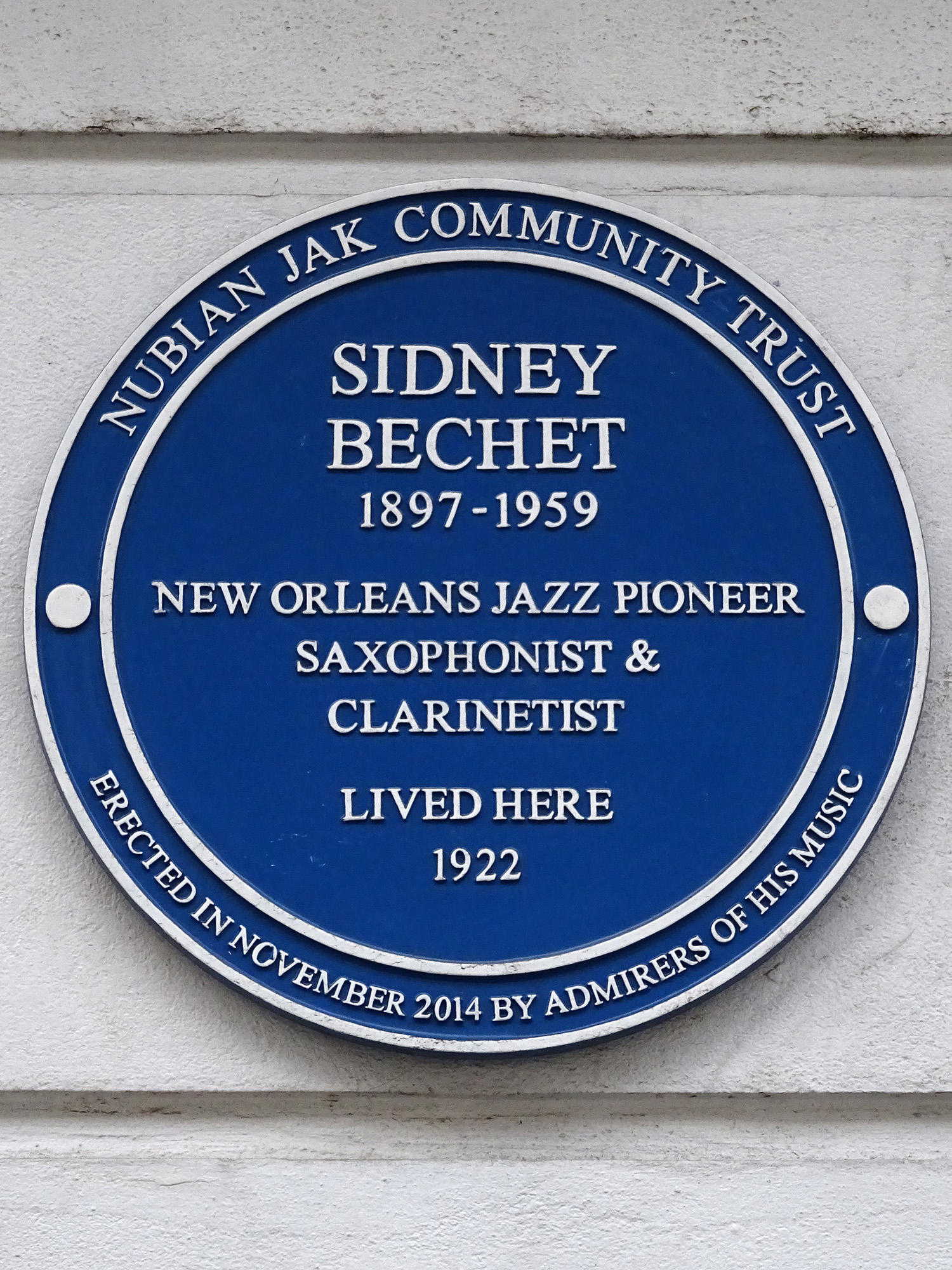
Sidney Bechet lived at No. 27 in 1922.

Sidney Bechet (1897–1959) the New Orleans jazz pioneer, saxophonist and clarinetist, lived at No. 27 in 1922, and a blue plaque from the Nubian Jak Community Trust commemorates this. The street is the home of the Embassy of Croatia in London.
