= Declan Lynch =

Irish columnist

Declan Lynch is a columnist with the Sunday Independent newspaper.

Born in Athlone, he attended Coosan NS and Marist College nearby. He graduated from Marist secondary. He tried law school but dropped out after a year and began writing. He has been a writer at the Sunday Independent for a number of years, contributing opinion columns and radio reviews.

He has authored a number of books including Tony10, about a Gorey postmaster who stole 1.75 million euros to support a gambling addiction.

== Notable works ==
- A Football Man – My Autobiography, by Johnny Giles (2010)
- Tony 10 (Gill Books, March 2019)
