= The Sultans of Ping =

Irish band

The Sultans of Ping FC
- Niall O'Flaherty at the Savoy, Cork, 30 December 2006

Background information
- Origin: Cork, Ireland
- Genres: Punk rock, indie rock
- Years active: 1988–1996 • 2005-Present
- Members: Niall O'Flaherty; Pat O'Connell; Ian Olney; Morty McCarthy; Sammy Stieger
- Past members: John McAuliffe; Paul Fennelly; Alan McFeely; Ger Lyons
- Website: sultansofping.com

The Sultans of Ping are an Irish band formed in 1988 by Niall O'Flaherty, Pat O'Connell, Paul Fennelly and Ger Lyons. The band's name is a play on the 1978 Dire Straits song "Sultans of Swing", dating from a time when "it was sacrilege to say anything whatsoever funny or nasty about Dire Straits".

== History ==
Following a number of line up changes including the loss of lead guitarist Ger Lyons, the band came to the attention of the Irish and UK music press, when "Where's Me Jumper" was released in January 1992. After several other independently released singles, the band signed to Epic Records, through a deal organised by Rhythm King Records's Martin Heath.

With Epic, the band released their debut album Casual Sex in the Cineplex, and its follow up Teenage Drug, with additional tracks gaining a Japan-only release. Teenage Drug was renamed Teenage Planet Sexy War in Japan, and included the single "Michiko".

Renaming themselves as The Sultans, they released their third album Good Year For Trouble in 1996. It included a cover version of The Third Bardo’s 1967 single “I’m Five Years Ahead Of My Time” listed as “Five Years” on the track listing. However, the album cover's artwork caused problems, as major record chains like HMV and Virgin decided that the display of bondage and S&M was too explicit. By this time, Rhythm King had been absorbed into Arista Records, as Martin Heath became the head of the department. The record label released the band from their recording contract.

Following a split in 1996, McCarthy joined the band Pharmacy, O'Flaherty was involved in producing the Japanese girl band Mika Bomb, while McFeely formed the rock and roll band Sister, and later recruited former bassist with The Young Offenders, Steve Hackett. McCarthy moved to Stockholm where he taught English. Vocalist Niall O'Flaherty subsequently pursued a career in academia.

The band reformed as The Sultans of Ping in 2005. Their decision to reform was officially confirmed by drummer Morty McCarthy in an interview with the Cork Evening Echo’s Mark McAvoy published in April 2005. They later played a number of gigs with Jim Bob of Carter The Unstoppable Sex Machine. In 2006, the group played a show with Radio 2's Mark Radcliffe, and his band The Family Mahone, as part of Manchester's yearly Irish Festival. That same year, the Sultans of Ping released their live DVD U Talk 2 Much: Live At The Cork Savoy Theatre on Cherry Red Records.

The band played several gigs in 2007, at the Brixton Academy in London (with Carter The Unstoppable Sex Machine), in Glasgow, and in Roscommon. They played a number of gigs in 2008, including Southend, London and Cork.

Drummer Morty McCarthy has written a book on Cork slang entitled Dowtcha Boy.

The title of the song "Give Him a Ball and a Yard of Grass", which appeared on their first album, was about Nottingham Forest player Nigel Clough and was based on a quote from football manager Brian Clough about John Robertson. The song contains several more of his sayings in its lyrics. This was given away free with Nottingham Forest Fanzine 'Brian' as a one track flexi-disk in April 1992.

The band were announced as the support act for Carter The Unstoppable Sex Machine's 'Norf and Sarf' show at London's Brixton Academy in November 2011. In April 2015, the Sultans played a one off sold out gig at the Soundhouse, Leicester.

Today, Niall O’Flaherty is a lecturer in the History of European Political Thought at King's College London, specialising in 18th and 19th century thinkers such as Thomas Robert Malthus and Charles Darwin. Pat O’Connell is in banking in London. Alan McFeely moved into film music. Morty McCarthy teaches English in Sweden.

== Impact ==
"Where's Me Jumper" featured as the theme song to the 2012 Sky1 series Moone Boy, and was the closing song in the 2016 Irish comedy The Young Offenders. The band later explained that the song was based on a real incident in Nottingham hotspot The Black Orchid, though the item lost was in fact a cardigan. "Give Him a Ball and a Yard of Grass" is the theme song used by the Republic of Ireland radio station Newstalk 106/108 on their 'Off The Ball' sports show.

=== Band members ===
- Niall O'Flaherty – vocals
- Pat O'Connell – guitar
- Ian Olney – bass (from 2005)
- Samuel Steiger – guitar (from 1995)
- Alan McFeely – bass (1991–1996)
- Morty McCarthy – drums (from 1991)
- Paul Fennelly – bass (until 1990)
- John McAuliffe – bass (until 1991)
- Ger Lyons – drums (until 1991)

== Discography ==
=== Albums ===
As Sultans of Ping F.C.:

- Casual Sex in the Cineplex (Rhythm King Records – February 1993) No. 26 (UK Albums Chart)

As Sultans of Ping:

- Teenage Drug (Epic Records – March 1994) No. 57 (UK Albums Chart)

As Sultans:

- Good Year for Trouble (Arista Records – June 1996)

=== Singles ===
As Sultans of Ping F.C.:

- "What About Those Sultans?" EP featuring "Stupid Kid" / "Riot at the Sheepdog Trials" / "Eamon Andrews"
- "Where's Me Jumper" (Divine Records ATHY 01 – Feb 92) No. 67 (UK Singles Chart) No. 8 (Ireland)
- "Stupid Kid" (Divine Records ATHY 02 – 27 Apr 92) No. 67 (UK Singles Chart) No. 11 (Ireland)
- "Veronica" (Divine Records ATHY 03 – Oct 92) No. 69 (UK Singles Chart)
- "U Talk 2 Much" (Rhythm King Records 6588877 – Jan 93) No. 26 (UK Singles Chart) No. 4 (Ireland)

As Sultans of Ping:

- "Teenage Punks" (Epic Records – Sep 93 ) No. 49 (UK Singles Chart)
- "Michiko" (Epic Records – Oct 93 ) No. 43 (UK Singles Chart)
- "Japanese Girls" (Sony Japan – 1993)
- "Wake Up And Scratch Me" (Epic Records – Feb 94) No. 50 (UK Singles Chart)
- "Miracle Michiko" EP (Japan only release – 1994)

As Sultans:

- "Mescaline" (1996) No. 21 (UK Independent Chart)

As The Sultans of Ping:

- "Girlwatching" (2007)
