= Cónal Creedon =

Irish writer and filmmaker

Cónal Creedon is an Irish novelist, dramatist, playwright and documentary filmmaker.

== Published books ==
Creedon has written a number of novel-length works.

- Pancho and Lefty Ride Out (Collins Press 1995)
- Passion Play (Poolbeg Press 1999)
- The Immortal Deed of Michael O’Leary (Cork City Libraries 2015)
- Second City Trilogy (Irishtown Press 2007)
- Passion Play (Irishtown Press 2016)
- Cornerstone (Cork City Libraries / UCC 2017)
- Begotten Not Made (Irishtown Press 2018)
- Pancho And Lefty Ride Again (Irishtown Press 2021)
- Art Imitating Life, Imitating Death (Irishtown Press 2022).

In 2020 Creedon's novel, Begotten Not Made, was awarded the Eric Hoffer Award USA and was nominated for the Dublin International Literary Award. In 2022 his latest collection of short fiction was awarded 'One City One Book' for Cork City. It was the most borrowed adult fiction book at Cork City Library in 2022. Creedon's prose has been translated into German, Bulgarian, Italian, Chinese. including English extracts published in China.

== Stage plays ==
Creedon's stage plays include: The Trial Of Jesus (2000, which was commissioned as part of the Irish National Millennium Celebrations and received two business Two Arts Awards from President of Ireland Mary McAleese, Glory Be To The Father (2002) and The Second City Trilogy (After Luke (2005), When I Was God (2005), The Cure (2005)) which was commissioned as part of the European City of Culture 2005. Creedon's trilogy of plays toured to China, where they featured at World Expo Shanghai (2010) and The JUE International Arts Festival Shanghai (2011). In 2009 two of Creedon's plays (When I Was God & After Luke) had their American premier at the Irish Repertory Theatre New York. They were reviewed in the New York Times. In 2013 the third play of Creedon's Second City Trilogy [The Cure] was produced as part of the Origin Theatre 1st Irish Festival New York. It also was well received by the New York Times theatre reviewer.

== Film documentaries ==
- The Burning of Cork (2005)
- Why the Guns Remained Silent in Rebel Cork (2006)
- If it's Spiced Beef (2007)
- The Boys of Fairhill (2009)
- Flynnie: The Man Who Walked Like Shakespeare (2008) – shortlisted for Focal International Documentary Awards UK London.

Creedon's documentaries were broadcast by RTÉ TV and were screened at the Irish Pavilion at World Expo 2010. Origin Theatre Festival New York 2022. Féile Belfast 2021. New York University NYU 2019.

== Radio drama ==
Creedon has written over 60 hours of original radio drama — broadcast on RTÉ, Lyric FM, BBC, BBC Radio 4 and BBC World Service. His work has achieved recognition in the One Voice Monologue Awards (BBC), The Francis McManus Awards (RTÉ), The PJ O’Connor Awards (RTÉ) and has represented Ireland in the BBC World Service World Play Radio Drama Competition. Reviews of Creedon's radio work included commendations in the Irish Times radio critics list of Best Radio of the Year for 1994 and 1997.

== Awards ==
- In recognition of his contribution to the arts, Creedon was appointed Writer-in-Residence at University College Cork [2016], and was subsequently appointed adjunct Professor of Creative Writing at University College Cork [2017], Heritage Ambassador for Cork City [2020], and recipient of the Lord Mayor's Culture Award[2020]. Cónal has twice been nominated Person of The Year [2001 & 2017] in his native city of Cork.
- Creedon's work was awarded the Eric Hoffer Award for Literary Fiction USA 2022 and has been nominated for Dublin International Book Award [2020 & 2023] and The Montaigne Award USA [2020] [Most Thought Provoking Book].
- His Stage plays received, two Irish National Business to Arts Awards [2000], also awarded Best Director, Best Actor and Best Supporting Actor at The 1st Irish New York Theatre Awards [2009 & 2013], and Nominated for Best Playwright Award at the 1st Irish Theatre Awards [2013] and the Irish Times Theatre Awards [2000].
- In 2022 his book was a finalist in the Next Generation Book Awards USA.

In 2021, Kilmeen Drama Group's production of Creedon's play, When I Was God, swept the boards at the All-Ireland Drama Festival, picking up awards for Best Production, Best Actor and Best Director.

Creedon's book, Pancho and Lefty Ride Again, was the most borrowed adult book from the Cork City library service during 2022.

== Personal life ==
Creedon grew up on Devonshire Street in Cork city, where he opened a laundrette in 1980s. His family lived and traded on this street for over a hundred years.
