= Falcon Airways =

British Charter Airline

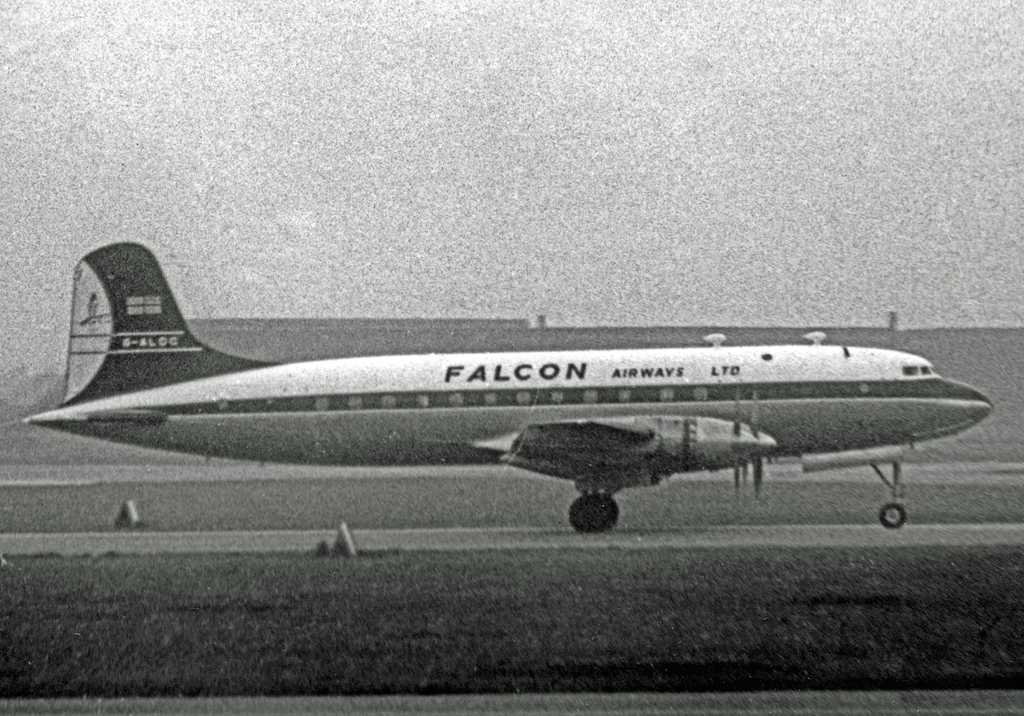
- Falcon Airway Ltd Handley Page Hermes 4 at Manchester Airport in 1960 when operating a holiday inclusive tour flight
- Founded: March 1959
- Commenced operations: March 1959
- Ceased operations: September 1961
- Operating bases: Hurn Airport; Gatwick Airport
- Fleet size: See Fleet below
- Key people: M K Kozubski (Founder)

Falcon Airways was a British charter airline that operated from 1959 to 1961 when the operating licence was withdrawn due to concerns over safety.

== History ==
Falcon Airways Ltd. was formed in March 1959 by Captain Marian Kozuba-Kozubski with one Vickers Viking at Hurn Airport which started to operate charter services from both Hurn and Blackbushe Airport. In October the airline acquired three four-engined Handley Page Hermes piston engine airliners, although one was sold in December.

In 1960 the airline and the two Hermes moved its operations from Blackbushe to Gatwick Airport but one Hermes was destroyed in a crash in October 1960 and the other was bought by Air Safaris leaving the airline without any aircraft.

In 1961 the airline bought three 82-seat Lockheed Constellations to operate long-range charter flights. Although they needed modification work to meet Air Registration Board requirements. In March when Kozubski flew one of the Constellations from Gander, Newfoundland, Canada to London Gatwick with West Indian immigrants, the aircraft had unserviceable radios and navigation equipment. It also did not have enough dinghies onboard and the airline was prosecuted and fined £300.

The airline did start to operate the first Constellation in May 1961 but it was withdrawn from service for maintenance shortly afterwards. The second aircraft was put into service in July 1961 but was then sold by the airline to another British operator Trans European. The third aircraft was registered in Austria rather than the United Kingdom and the British authorities refused to let the airline operate an unmodified aircraft.

This temporarily grounded the airline until the first Constellation returned to service in August 1961 and following the collapse of another British airline the Ministry eventually allowed them to operate the Austrian aircraft. In September 1961 following concerns about safety the airlines operating certificate was withdrawn by the British authorities and the airline ceased to operate.

== Accidents and incidents ==
- On 9 October 1960, a Handley Page Hermes G-ALDC overran the runway on landing at Southend Airport, ending up across the Shenfield to Southend railway line. The aircraft was written off. Of the 76 people on board, five were taken to hospital with injuries.

== See also ==
- List of defunct airlines of the United Kingdom
