= Airwork Services =

1928–1960 British airline

Airwork
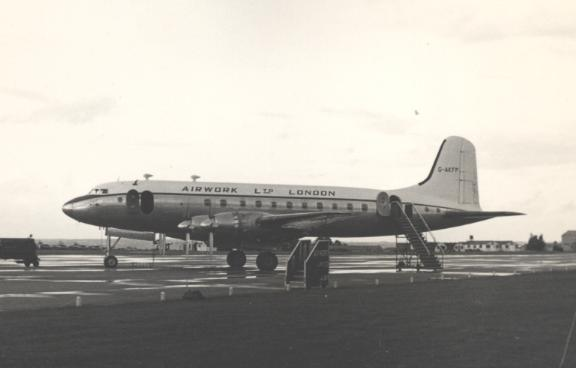
- Handley Page Hermes IV at Blackbushe Airport in 1954, operating a trooping flight
IATA	ICAO	Call sign
AW	—	—
- Founded: 1928
- Commenced operations: 1946
- Ceased operations: 1960 (merged to form British United Airways)
- Hubs: Blackbushe Airport
- Fleet size: 12
- Destinations: mostly Africa
- Headquarters: Central London
- Key people: R. Louden Cumming; M.D. Wyatt; W.K. Davison; L.R. Castlemaine; G.E. Ford; K.R. Sangster; L.A. Lafone; A.D. Page

Airwork Limited, also referred to during its history as Airwork Services Limited, is a wholly owned subsidiary company of VT Group plc. It has provided a variety of defence support services to the Royal Air Force (RAF), Fleet Air Arm and overseas air forces, as well as having played an important role in the development of civil aviation, both in the United Kingdom and abroad.

== History ==
=== Origins ===
The company was founded on October 11, 1928 by Nigel Norman and Alan Muntz, with the opening of the private Heston Aerodrome in Middlesex. In the early days, Airwork's chief pilot was Captain Valentine Baker, who later formed the world-famous Martin-Baker company with Sir James Martin. In December 1936, Airwork Limited was registered at Companies House, and the newly formed company started its long association with RAF flying training.

Airwork moved out of Heston in 1935 due to a lack of adequate space and relocated to Gatwick, where it continued with a contract to maintain Whitley bombers for the RAF. During the 1930s, Airwork also helped to establish the predecessors of the post-World War II national airlines of Egypt, India and Rhodesia. Thus, Misr Airlines, Indian Airlines and Central African Airways were Airwork descendants.

=== RAF training ===
In June 1936, Airwork opened No. 11 RAF Elementary and Reserve Flying Training School (ERFTS) at Perth in Scotland, under contract to the Air Ministry. The company developed accommodation and facilities there, and provided aircraft in the form of the de Havilland Tiger Moth. Other Airwork operated ERFTS followed soon afterwards with No. 14 ERFTS at Castle Bromwich in July 1937, No. 17 ERFTS at Barton in October 1937, No. 50 ERFTS at Barton, and Ringway in May 1939 and No. 44 ERFTS at Elmdon in May 1939.

With the outbreak of World War II the word 'Reserve' was dropped, and the 50 ERFTS establishments were consolidated into 20 Elementary Flying Training Schools (EFTS). No 17 ERFTS was disbanded at that time, and No. 44 ERFTS at Elmdon was merged with No. 14 ERFTS at Castle Bromwich to form No. 14 EFTS. One further Airwork-run unit, No. 21 EFTS, was established at Booker in June 1941, with Miles Magisters supplementing the Tiger Moths then in use there and at all other EFTS. Through its sites at Gatwick and newer aerodromes at Staverton, Renfrew and Loughborough, Airwork also became a vital part of the Air Ministry's maintenance operations. Further aircrew training, for example No. 6 Air Observer navigation School at Staverton using de Havilland Dominies and Avro Ansons, also featured prominently. Airwork's contribution to the war effort was a vital one, and the company was responsible for the initial training of tens of thousands of pilots. There were also engineering contracts that included the manufacture of Avro Lancaster wings and modifications on Douglas Bostons, as well as the preparation, maintenance and repair of Hawker Hurricanes, Whitleys, Vought Corsairs, Grumman Hellcats, Consolidated B-24 Liberators and North American P-51 Mustangs.

=== Postwar flying training ===
Following the war, Airwork purchased Perth Aerodrome from the local Council, and developed a highly successful flying school for commercial pilots. In 1947, Airwork relocated its headquarters to Langley in Buckinghamshire and further new sites were established at Blackbushe Airport (overhaul and sales) and at Lasham (engineering). By now Airwork had been acquired by the Cowdray family, and had become part of the British & Commonwealth (B&C) group of companies. Airwork continued its flying training role providing elementary, RN grading, Volunteer Reserve (VR) and University Air Squadron (UAS) flying training across its locations initially using Tiger Moths and, from the 1950s, the Chipmunk.

A new Reserve Flying School (13 RFS) was established at Grangemouth in April 1948, and at RAF Usworth (23 RFS) in February 1949. In April 1951, Airwork also assumed responsibility of No.2 Basic Air Navigation School at Usworth. Approximately 25 Avro Anson T.21's were used and supported during this time. In addition, there were between 15 and 20 Chipmunks, which were used by the Durham University Air Squadron – mostly at weekends. These were also maintained by Airwork. At RAF Digby Airwork was also responsible for running the No 1 Grading Unit during 1952/53.

=== Air transport ===
During the post-war period Airwork also further expanded its business into civil aviation. This expansion was financed by its wealthy shareholders, including Lord Cowdray, Whitehall Securities, the Blue Star shipping line, Furness Withy and Thomas Loel Evelyn Bulkeley Guinness.

Airwork's other air transport related activities include contracting, aircraft servicing and maintenance, sale and purchase of aircraft, operation and management of flying schools and clubs, contract charter flying, overhaul and modification of aircraft, specialised aerodrome catering and aviation insurance.

==== Airline-type operations ====
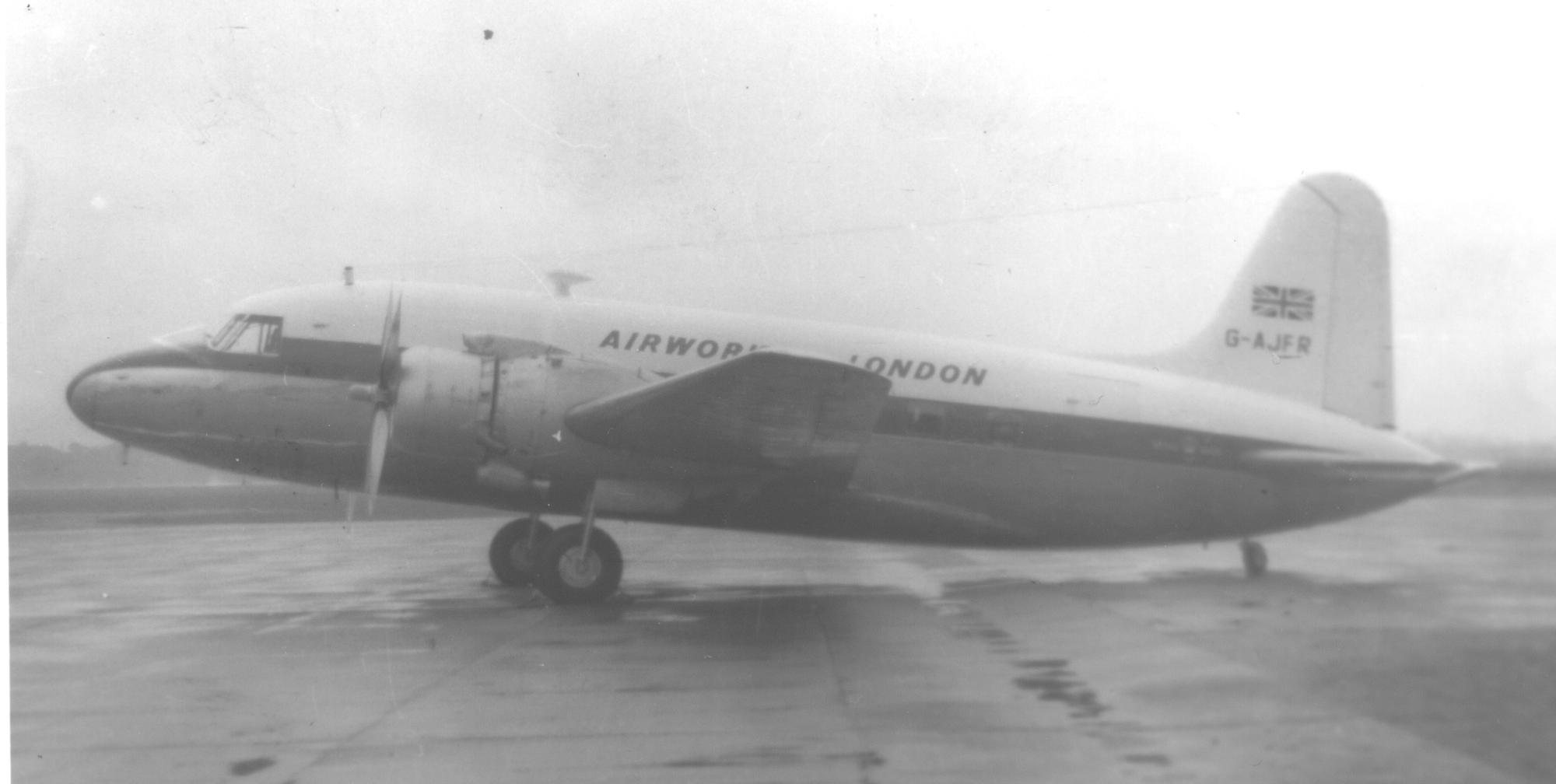
Vickers Viking 1B on a charter flight at Manchester in 1957

During the early post-World War II years, charter flights using Handley Page Hermes and Vickers Viking airliners, primarily flying out of Blackbushe Airport, constituted the bulk of Airwork's commercial air transport activities. These included a twice weekly series of flights on behalf of the Sudanese government, which carried 10,000 passengers (Note: including 394 babies) between London, Wadi Halfa and Khartoum between 1947 and 1950, as well as a series of inclusive tour (IT) flights under contract to the UK Civil Service, and flights carrying Muslim pilgrims to and from Jeddah during the annual Hajj season. Airwork was also among the UK independent (Note: independent from government-owned corporations) airlines participating in the Berlin Airlift.

Airwork first proposed transporting troops by air rather than by sea in 1950. The company's contacts with the War Office helped Airwork become the first carrier to be awarded a trooping flight contract. The War Office subsequently made Airwork its main contractor for the UK—Singapore trooping service, as well as its unofficial "chosen instrument" for all trooping flights that were contracted to third parties. However, the Hermes aircraft that operated most of these flights frequently suffered from engine faults. This resulted in crash landings on a number of occasions. These incidents cast doubt on the aircraft's reliability and the airline's safety record, as a result of which the firm lost its monopoly in the trooping business.

In 1952, Airwork applied for UK and US authority to operate scheduled transatlantic all-freight services from London via Manchester to New York City's Idlewild airport (later JFK).

Focus on Africa

The same year, on 14 June, Airwork began operating quasi-scheduled low-fare services from the UK to East, Central, Southern and West Africa using Vikings. These services were part of a joint operation with Hunting Air Transport, another wholly private British independent airline of that era. Flights initially operated on a fortnightly basis. International Air Transport Association (IATA) minimum fare rules did not apply to these services because the governments that owned most of IATA's member airlines had not empowered it to set and control domestic air fares, including dependent overseas territories.

The first joint Airwork-Hunting all-economy Safari/colonial coach class (Note: British residents only) service from London to Nairobi routed via Malta, Benghazi, Wadi Halfa, Khartoum, Juba and Entebbe. It used single-class 27-seat Vikings, which took three days (Note: with night stops) to complete the journey. Although this compared unfavourably with British Overseas Airways Corporation (BOAC), whose regular scheduled services took only 24 hours, load factors averaged 93% during the first nine months of operation. Airwork and Hunting-Clan continued to achieve very high average load factors of 85–90% because their £98 single fare was £42 cheaper than the comparable BOAC fare. These load factors were much higher than BOAC's, as a result of which the independents doubled the flight frequency on their London-Nairobi Safari/colonial coach route to once-a-week. This service proved to be so popular that a second weekly frequency was eventually added, which was operated alternately by each airline.

In June 1953, Airwork and Hunting jointly launched a fortnightly Safari/colonial coach service between London and Salisbury, entailing one round trip per month by each company. In June 1954, Airwork and Hunting launched a joint Safari/colonial coach service to West Africa linking London with Accra via Lisbon, Las Palmas, Bathurst and Freetown.

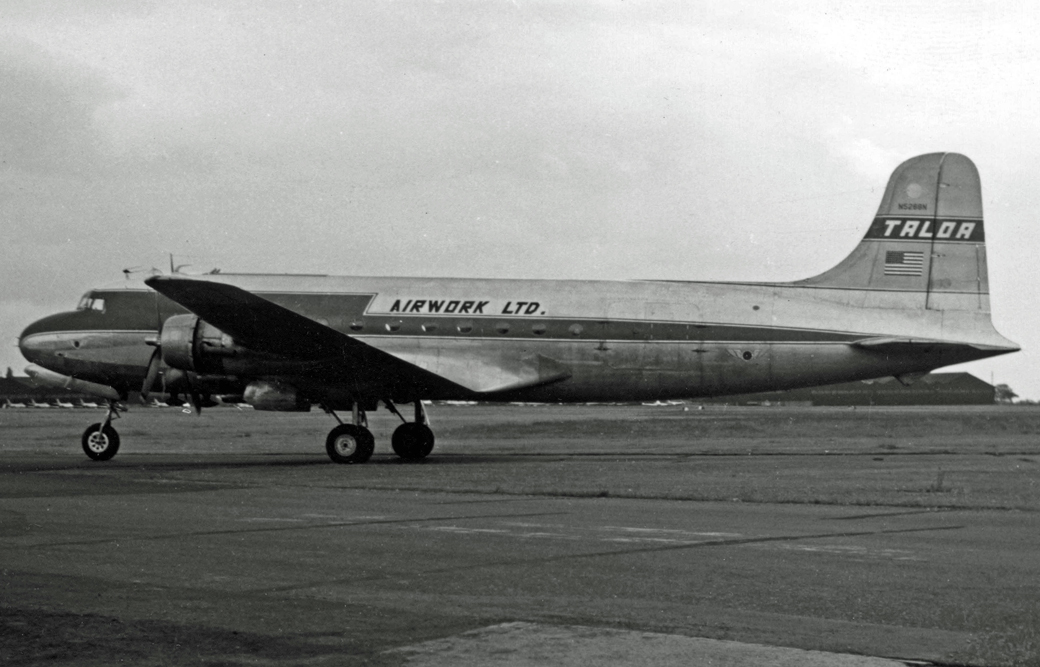
Leased Douglas DC-4 Skymaster operating Airwork's 1955 scheduled transatlantic all-freight service

Following long-delayed approval of Airwork's application for a scheduled transatlantic London-Manchester-New York all-cargo service, flights eventually commenced in early 1955, using aircraft and crews chartered from US supplemental air carrier Transocean Air Lines and US cargo airline Slick Airways. However, the operation ceased by year-end. In September 1956 Airwork acquired control of Transair, a fellow independent airline.

Preparations for the merger

By 1957, Airwork and Hunting-Clan had converted their successful East, West and Southern African Safari/colonial coach flights into regular "third-class" scheduled services. However, the Government forced the independents to maintain additional stops that were no longer needed, as a result of replacing Vikings with technologically advanced Douglas DC-6s and Vickers Viscounts. It also required them to share all traffic with BOAC on a 30:70 basis. Despite these restrictions, the independents' services were fully booked five months ahead within a fortnight of their launch. When Britain's African colonies became independent, Safari/colonial coach was converted into a fully fledged scheduled service. To secure their traffic rights between the UK and the newly independent African nations, Airwork and Hunting-Clan began participating in revenue-sharing agreements with BOAC and the destination countries' flag carriers. (Note: following Airwork's absorption into British United Airways (BUA) and that airline's subsequent acquisition by Caledonian Airways to form British Caledonian (BCal), these arrangements continued to be the legal basis of BUA's and BCal's UK—Africa scheduled services)

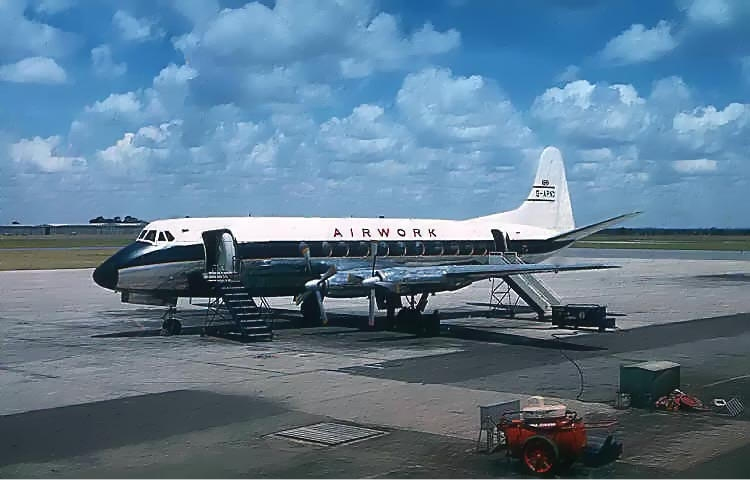
Vickers Viscount 1959 Salisbury Airport

In 1958 Morton Air Services became a subsidiary. In that same year the process of merging the Airwork-controlled airlines with Hunting-Clan to form British United Airways (BUA) started. In early 1959, Airwork took over Air Charter, Freddie Laker's first airline venture. In that same month it took control of Olley Air Service. In February of that year, Airwork transferred the operation of its Safari flights to its subsidiary Transair, together with two Viscount aircraft. This resulted in the service's London terminal moving from Blackbushe to Gatwick. On 19 May 1960, Airwork merged its operations into British United Airways but legal integration was postponed to 1 July. The origins of British United Airways name went back to United Airways, one of the three predecessors of the pre-World War II British Airways. The [re-]use of the United Airways name together with the prefix British had been agreed with shareholder Whitehall Securities, the controlling shareholder of both United Airways and Spartan Airways before these airlines' merger with Hillman's Airways to form the pre-war British Airways. By the time Airwork merged with Hunting-Clan to form BUA, the former's air transport subsidiaries already included Airwork Helicopters, Air Charter, Bristow Helicopters, Channel Air Bridge, Transair and Morton Air Services. By that time, Airwork had also negotiated a long-term charter contract with the Gold Coast Chamber of Mines. This entailed regular Hermes services between the UK and West Africa.

In addition to Airwork's airline operations, the company serviced numerous airliners in the civil maintenance hangar at Hurn Airport. These included Sudan Airways Doves and Dakotas, Skymasters, and Vikings of various operators.

== Fleet ==
=== 1946-1960 fleet details ===
Airwork operated the following aircraft types:

- 3 x AS.65 Airspeed Consul
- 5 x DH.89A Dragon Rapide
- 6 x Percival Proctor
- 2 x Avro 652A Anson
- 4 x Bristol B-170
- 3 x DeHavilland DH.104 Dove
- 9 x Douglas DC-3/C-47A/B/Dakota C.4
- 2 x Douglas DC-4/C-54/54A leased from TALOA
- 2 x Douglas DC-6A never delivered
- 7 x Handley Page Hermes 4/4A/5
- 9 x Vickers Viking 627
- 4 x Vickers Viscount 2 serie 700, 2 serie 800

=== April 1958 fleet ===
In April 1958, the Airwork fleet comprised twelve aircraft:

Aircraft	Number	Years of service	Remarks
Handley Page Hermes	4	1952-1959	
Vickers Viscount 700	2	1958-1959	
Vickers Viscount 800	2	1959-1959	
Vickers Viking	5	1947-1960	
Airspeed Consul	1	1947-1962	Operated by Airwork Services Training
Total	12		

== Accidents and incidents ==
- 23 July 1952 - Non-fatal accident which involved a Handley Page HP.81 Hermes 4A (registration: G-ALDB) operating a trooping flight from Blackbushe to the RAF station in Fayid, Egypt. While the aircraft was overflying France, the flightdeck crew noticed a defect in the no. 4 engine and decided to make an emergency landing at the nearest diversion airfield. This resulted in a crash landing at Pithiviers. Although the aircraft was damaged beyond repair, there were no fatalities among the 70 occupants (six crew and 64 passengers). The evidence at the crash site seemed to suggest that an internal failure occurred inside the no. 4 engine, which caused over-speeding and subsequent disintegration of the reduction gear pinion bearing.
- 25 August 1952. - Fatal accident which involved a Handley Page HP.81 Hermes 4A (registration: G-ALDF) operating an international non-scheduled passenger flight from Blackbushe to Khartoum via Malta. When the aircraft approached Sicily, an engine malfunction affecting engines no. 2 and 3 forced the flightdeck crew to shut down both engines as well as to feather both propellers. Intensive use of the onboard radio equipment to send out emergency signals soon depleted the aircraft's batteries. The resulting electrical power failure caused the remaining two engines to fail as well. This in turn forced the flightdeck crew to ditch the aircraft close to small Formiche islands, off the port of Trapani, killing seven of the 57 occupants.

The subsequent accident investigation established the failure of one or both of the inner two engines (no. 2 and 3) as the primary cause. Although the reason for the engines' failure could not be determined, the investigators concluded that only one of these engines malfunctioned and that an error of the flight engineer caused the other one to fail. The investigators furthermore cited a number of contributory factors. These included:

1. The flightdeck crew's state of mind arising from the knowledge of an earlier accident involving the same aircraft type that had been caused by a power plant failure.
2. Failure of electrical generators following the stoppage of the no. 2 and 3 engines.
3. Inadequate batteries that neither ensured normal flight functions nor permitted the transmission of a satisfactory distress message.
4. Limited experience of the flightdeck and cabin crew on this aircraft type.
5. The cabin crew's failure to properly follow emergency procedures.
6. Missing or unusable life rafts.
7. The failure of life belts.
- 15 August 1954 - Second non-fatal accident which involved a Vickers 627 Viking 1B (registration: G-AIXS) operating a passenger flight from Blackbushe to Nice Côte d'Azur Airport. The captain noticed oil streaming from the no. 2 engine ten minutes after takeoff from Blackbushe. He decided to feather the propeller and to return to Blackbushe, where the aircraft struck the ground 135 yd (123 m) short of the runway. Although this damaged the aircraft beyond repair, there were no fatalities among the 37 occupants (five crew and 32 passengers). The accident investigators concluded that the captain's failure to prevent the aircraft from stalling while making a single engine approach was the probable cause. The captain's distraction by a flickering red undercarriage indicator light during the critical final approach stage was cited as a contributory factor.
- 1 September 1957 - Third non-fatal accident which involved a Handley Page HP.81 Hermes 4A (registration: G-AKFP) operating an international non-scheduled passenger flight from Blackbushe to Singapore via Karachi, Delhi and Calcutta. While approaching Calcutta, the aircraft was cleared for a runway 19L Instrument Landing System approach at Dum Dum Airport. A shower passed at break-off height, as a result of which the flightdeck crew could not see the runway and decided to carry out an overshoot. Dum Dum Air Traffic Control then offered the captain an assisted approach to runway 01R and advised that he was no. 2 to land. Radar control guided the aircraft during the assisted approach and cleared it for a visual landing. At that time the aircraft was a mile from the runway threshold and to the left of 01R's centreline. After breaking through the clouds, the captain was able to see the runway and continued his visual approach without realising that he was actually approaching 01L.

When the Airwork Hermes came in to land, an Indian Airlines DC-3 (registration: VT-AUA) had just been cleared to line up and hold on runway 01L. This resulted in the Hermes striking the DC-3. This in turn resulted in the death of the Indian aircraft's four crew members who were its only occupants. There were no fatalities among the Hermes's 64 occupants (six crew and 58 passengers) although the aircraft was damaged beyond repair. Accident investigators cited the Hermes captain's failure to maintain effective radio communications with the tower during the final stage of the radar-assisted approach and his decision to continue with a visual approach under conditions that did not allow him to positively identify the correct runway as the probable cause of this runway collision.

== Fleet Requirements Unit ==
A major contract was secured in September 1952 when Airwork was selected by the Royal Navy to operate the Fleet Requirements Unit (FRU) at Hurn Airport, near Bournemouth. The FRU employed civilian pilots using Fleet Air Arm aircraft to provide target aircraft for the training of Royal Navy radar operators. The first type of aircraft, Sea Mosquito, began arriving at Hurn in August 1952 and these were replaced during 1953 by the de Havilland Sea Hornet. Over the next decade the FRU's duties were expanded to include all aspects of Fleet requirement tasks including target towing for gunnery purposes, eventually covering not just UK based destroyers and frigates but the Mediterranean Fleet as well. A wide variety of aircraft types were used over the years with the Sea Hornet being followed, in chronological order, by the Supermarine Attacker (1955–1957), Sea Fury (1955–1961), Sea Hawk (1956–1969), Westland Dragonfly (1958–1961), Gloster Meteor (1958–1971), Supermarine Scimitar (1965–1970), Hawker Hunter (1969–1972) and English Electric Canberra (1969–1972).

== Military training in the UK ==
Airwork was also contracted by the Fleet Air Arm in January 1950 to provide aircraft at RNAS Brawdy to exercise the Aircraft Direction School at nearby Kete in Pembrokeshire. They also undertook a Heavy Twin Conversion Course for Fleet Air Arm pilots using de Havilland Sea Hornets and Sea Mosquitos. This Unit moved to RAF St Davids in September 1951 and operated a jet conversion course with Gloster Meteor T.7s. It returned to RNAS Brawdy in October 1958 but continued to use RAF St. Davids as a satellite. Finally, in January 1961, it relocated to RNAS Yeovilton where it operated as the Air Direction Training Unit (ADTU). Aircraft used here were the de Havilland Sea Venom, de Havilland Sea Vampire, Hawker Hunter and de Havilland Sea Vixen.

A further contract was won in 1953 when Airwork was appointed to operate RAF Oxford for the benefit of trainee radar operators at the RAF Sopley radar station situated close to Hurn. The Oxfords were replaced in June 1957 by fourteen Boulton Paul Balliols that provided a service to the trainee trackers and plotters of the School of Fighter Control that had relocated to Sopley from RAF Bolt Head in Devon. The Balliols remained in service with Airwork until 1960.

In January 1957, Airwork Services Ltd was created to separate the defence support activities from the airline business elements, which continued under the original Airwork Ltd name. During summer 1959 Airwork moved its head office from Langley to Hurn. Its overhaul facilities were also centralised there. As a result, the operations at Blackbushe, Langley and Lasham were closed.

In 1960, Airwork acquired the Aeronautical Engineering College in Hamble, and relocated it to its existing training operation at Perth Aerodrome where the revised enterprise became known as Airwork Services Training. In 1971 Airwork added an English Language School to the facilities at Perth to service a training contract with the Imperial Iranian Navy. Quickly the School's main business became language training for students due to train at either the Flying School or the Aeronautical Engineering College and it became part of Air Service Training. Pilot training at Perth ceased in 1996 but a successful engineering training college continues to this day under new ownership as Air Service Training (AST).

Throughout the 1960s Airwork continued elementary and University Air Squadron flying training including training pilots of the Army Air Corps at AAC Middle Wallop in DHC Chipmunks and Hiller UH-12s. Airwork was also responsible for overhauling these aircraft. It also provided a complete flying grading service for the Royal Navy's Britannia Flight at Roborough, near Plymouth – something that under its present guise it continues to do today. The 1970s saw the introduction of the Bulldog, which gradually replaced the popular Chipmunk. The Baron training aircraft of the College of Air Training arrived at Hurn in February 1971 and Airwork assumed responsibility for their maintenance. At the end of 1978 Scottish Aviation Bulldogs of the Southampton University Air Squadron and DHC Chipmunks of No. 2 AEF relocated to Hurn and Airwork became responsible for their storage and maintenance. The Bulldogs were used for training by potential RAF pilots whilst the Chipmunks were used by local Air Cadets.

In November 1972, the Fleet Requirements Unit was relocated from Hurn to RNAS Yeovilton and amalgamated with the Air Direction Training Unit to form the Fleet Requirements & Air Direction Training Unit (FRADTU). The word 'Training' was later dropped from the Unit's name to form the more familiar FRADU. The new Unit continued to use the Hunters, Canberras and, in the early days, Sea Vixens that had previously been used by the FRU and ADTU. In 1983, the FRADU contract was put out to competitive tender and was subsequently awarded to FR Aviation.

Airwork quickly put this setback behind it and in 1984 was awarded a contract for the operation of No. 1 Flying Training School RAF Linton-on-Ouse. It was then equipped with the Bulldog and Jet Provost. The Jet Provost was in turn replaced by the Shorts Tucano in 1989. The company also managed to regain an element of the FRADU business, when in 1988 it obtained a contract to overhaul FRADU Hunters at Hurn.

Whilst Airwork's airline activities had merged into the B&C-controlled BUA group as long ago as 1960, it was only in January 1980 that the company's remaining operations reverted to the original name of Airwork Ltd. At this time, Airwork also supplied air traffic control services at Exeter Airport and operated Unst and Scatsta airfields in Shetland. Airwork Services Training also continued to thrive at Perth Airport in Scotland. In 1991, the Britavia (formerly Aviation Traders) design office moved from Southend to the Airwork offices at Hurn once they were rebuilt following a serious fire in August of that year.

== Overseas activities ==
Airwork operated the British Civil Air Training Mission to Saudi Arabia from 1947 to 1949, based in Taif, Saudi Arabia. This was a flying school with 3 Tiger Moth and 1 Anson Aircraft.

Following the creation of the Sultanate of Muscat and Oman Air Force (SMOAF) in March 1959, Airwork was appointed to provide maintenance and technical support. The new air force initially consisted of Pioneer CC.1, Provost T.Mk.52 and DHC-2 Beaver aircraft. Growing problems with civil unrest and insurgency, primarily in the Dhofar region, during the late 1960s led to the expansion of the SMOAF. Initially this was through the formation of a squadron of BAC Strikemaster Mk.82 aircraft and also through acquisitions of the C-47, DHC-4 Caribou, Skyvan, Defender, Viscount, One-Eleven and VC10 aircraft.

The conditions in which Airwork staff had to work were some of the most challenging in the world with shade temperatures of over 40 °C commonplace and cockpit temperatures on the ground often exceeding an unbearable 80 °C. Existing working practices had to be radically amended accordingly. Airwork's support role in Oman was further cemented in the late 1970s by the arrival of over thirty Hawker Hunters. Two squadrons of SEPECAT Jaguars followed, further expanding the capability of the Sultanate of Oman Air Force (SOAF), the name of which had been adopted in 1970. During the early 1980s three C-130H Hercules transport aircraft were ordered. Renamed Royal Air Force of Oman (RAFO) in 1990, more new combat aircraft were acquired in the shape of four new BAE Hawk 103s and twelve Hawk 203s delivered in 1993.

In addition to providing aircraft maintenance and airfield communications support services to SOAF\RAFO, Airwork was also involved in providing radio and radar support to the Royal Navy of Oman (RNO) and ground radio for the Royal Army of Oman (RAO). Spares provisioning and personal recruitment were provided from Airwork's UK headquarters at Hurn and the nearby Supplies Division in Ferndown.

The success of the Omani partnership led to Airwork securing similar support contracts in other countries. In Saudi Arabia Airwork was contracted between 1966 and 1973 to provide servicing and training for the Saudi's English Electric Lightnings, Hunters, BAC Strikemasters and Cessna 172s. Airwork also provided a similar service in South Yemen, Kuwait and Jordan. In Africa, Airwork developed a support presence in Nigeria, Sudan and Zimbabwe with aircraft from these countries also being overhauled at Hurn.

During the 1960s Airwork carried out delivery flights of a number of Fairey Gannets to Indonesia. A large number of aircraft were also handled at Hurn during this time prior to delivery for the Abu Dhabi Air Force, (Caribou and Islander), Ghana (Shorts Skyvan), Qatar Police (Gazelle helicopter), the Singapore Air Force (BAC Strikemaster), South Arabian Air Force (Bell 47G and Dakotas) and the Sudan Air Force (Jet Provost). The supply of spares and equipment from Hurn was central to activities with Britannia, CL-44 and Douglas DC-6 freighter aircraft being frequently used.

== Takeover and current status ==
Following a management buyout in 1988, Airwork became part of the Bricom Group of companies. Airwork were part of the Nobel Group and administered through a bank. In 1992, a contract with the RAF at St. Athan to modify a number of Tornado F.3 aircraft was to have far reaching consequences for the company. Serious damage was caused to the centre fuselage of 16 aircraft during the removal of rivets. When the extent of the damage became clear, the Ministry of Defence cancelled the contract with Airwork and pursued compensation from Bricom. Questions were asked in the Houses of Parliament and the reputation of Airwork – at least in the UK – was dealt a grievous blow, (although this was not supported by the facts; the MOD and BAe had produced incorrect engineering drawings). A multi-million pound compensation settlement was eventually agreed out of court, and the Tornado F.3 aircraft involved were repaired by new contractors, replacing the damaged centre fuselages with those from surplus Tornado F.2 aircraft, which had been earmarked for disposal.

Short Brothers of Belfast, which had itself been bought by the Canadian company Bombardier in 1989, acquired Airwork as a wholly owned subsidiary in November 1993, and the company became known as Bombardier Defence Services Limited. The VT Group subsequently took over the business – renaming it VT Defence – in a £30m deal in June 2000. Whilst in the UK, the former Airwork element of the business which traded under the name VT Aerospace, the name and brand of Airwork is still used prominently in Oman as Airwork Technical Services and Partners LLC, and a new five-year contract to support the Royal Air Force of Oman commenced in January 2005. Airwork Technical Services LLC (ATS) was acquired in July 2010 by Babcock International Group during the acquisition of the VT Group and the operation in Oman continues to this day in support of Aircraft Maintenance and Training for the Royal Air Force of Oman (RAFO) across its military aircraft fleets. Current activities include:

- Technical Support Services – the provision of manpower for all aspects of aircraft maintenance related activities including: quality assurance, safety at work and on-the-job-training and mentoring of technicians.
- Defence Supplies (Logistics) – the provision of equipment and spares, repairs, calibration and other services.
- Technical Training – the training of managers, and instructors who carry out course design, accreditation, quality assurance and instruction in the Air Force Training College.

== See also ==
- Aerospace industry in the United Kingdom
- Fleet Requirements Unit

== Notes ==
Notes

Citations

Bibliography

- 'The Squadrons of the Fleet Air Arm' by Ray Sturtivant and Theo Ballance, (Air Britain) ISBN 0-85130-223-8
- 'RAF Flying Training and Support Units' by Ray Sturtivant, 1997, (Air-Britain) ISBN 0-85130-252-1
- 'Bournemouth's Airports – a History' by Mike Phipp (Tempus Publishing Ltd) ISBN 0-7524-3923-5
- 'Manchester's Early Airfields' by R.A.Scholefield, an extended chapter in 'Moving Manchester', 2004, (Lancashire & Cheshire Antiquarian Society) ISSN 0950-4699
- Wickstead, M.J. (2014). Airlines of the British Isles since 1919. Staplefield (West Sussex - U.K.): Air Britain (Historians) Ltd. pp. 47–49. ISBN 978-0-85130-456-4.
- Eglin, Roger; Ritchie, Berry (1980). Fly me, I'm Freddie. London, UK: Weidenfeld and Nicolson. ISBN 0-297-77746-7.
- Dean, W.P.; O'Callaghan, M. (2008). The ATL-98 Carvair: A Comprehensive History of the Aircraft and All 21 Airframes (1: Corporate History - Air Holdings, pp. 14/5). Jefferson, N.C., USA: McFarland & Co. ISBN 978-0-7864-3670-5.
- Amos, P. Airwork : A history. U.K.: Air-Britain Historians Ltd.
- McCloskey, Keith (2012). Airwork: A History. Brinscombe Port (Gloucestershire), UK: The History Press. ISBN 978-0-75247-972-9.
- "Flight International". Flight International. Sutton, UK. ISSN 0015-3710. (various backdated issues relating to the Airwork airline, 1928–1960)
