= Vickers VC.1 Viking =

British airliner with 2 piston engines, 1945

VC.1 Viking
- Vickers Viking 1A, G-AGRN

General information
- Type: Airliner
- Manufacturer: Vickers-Armstrongs Limited
- Designer: R.K. Pierson
- Status: Retired
- Primary user: British European Airways
- Number built: 163

History
- Manufactured: 1945–1954
- Introduction date: 1946
- First flight: 22 June 1945
- Developed from: Vickers Wellington
- Variants: Vickers Valetta; Vickers Varsity

The Vickers VC.1 Viking is a British twin-engine short-range airliner derived from the Vickers Wellington bomber and built by Vickers-Armstrongs Limited at Brooklands near Weybridge in Surrey. After the Second World War, the Viking was an important airliner with British airlines, pending the development of turboprop aircraft like the Viscount. An experimental airframe was fitted with Rolls-Royce Nene turbojets and first flown in 1948 as the world's first pure jet transport aircraft. Military developments were the Vickers Valetta and the Vickers Varsity.

== Design and development ==
The Ministry of Aircraft Production ordered three prototype Wellington Transport Aircraft to Air Ministry Specification 17/44 from Vickers-Armstrongs Limited. The specification was for a peacetime requirement for an interim short-medium haul passenger aircraft to serve until the more advanced designs specified by the Brabazon Committee (in particular, the Airspeed Ambassador and Armstrong Whitworth Apollo) could be developed. To speed development the aircraft used the wing and undercarriage design from the Wellington but the fuselage was new. Although the original contract referred to Wellington Transport Aircraft, on completion, the name Viking was chosen.

The first prototype (designated the Type 491 and registered G-AGOK) was built by the Vickers Experimental Department at its wartime Foxwarren dispersal site and was first flown by 'Mutt' Summers at Wisley Airfield on 22 June 1945. This aircraft crashed on 23 April 1946 due to a double engine failure; no fatalities occurred as a result of the crash. Following successful trials of the three prototypes the Ministry of Aircraft Production ordered 50 aircraft. The first BOAC aircraft flew on 23 March 1946. The prototypes were then used for trials with the Royal Air Force which led to orders for military versions (the Viking C2 (12 ordered as freighter/transports) and the modified Valetta C1).

The jet-powered Vickers Nene Viking G-AJPH

The initial 19 production aircraft (later designated the Viking 1A) carried 21 passengers, they had metal fuselages and - except for the wing inboard of the nacelles - fabric-clad geodetic wings and tail units. Following feedback from customers, the next 14 examples, known as the Viking 1, featured stressed-metal wings and tail units. The next variant, the Viking 1B, was 28 in (71 cm) longer, carrying 24 passengers with up-rated Bristol Hercules piston engines, achieved a production run of 115. One of this batch was changed during production to so that it could be fitted with two Rolls-Royce Nene turbojet engines, with its first flight on 6 April 1948.

On 25 July 1948, on the 39th anniversary of Blériot's crossing of the English Channel, the Type 618 Nene-Viking flew Heathrow–Paris (Villacoublay) in the morning carrying letters to Bleriot's widow and son (secretary of the FAI), who met it at the airport. The flight of 222 miles (357 km) took only 34 minutes. It then flew back to London in the afternoon. It obtained a maximum speed of 415 mph (668 km/h) at 12,000 ft (3,700 m) and averaged 394 mph (634 km/h). In 1954 it was bought from the Ministry of Supply and underwent the substantial conversion to Hercules 634 piston engines by Eagle Aviation to join their fleet.

Production finished in 1948, including 16 for the RAF of which four were for the King's Flight, but in 1952 BEA adapted some to a 38-passenger layout, taking the maximum payload up from 5,500 to 7,200 lb (2,500 to 3,300 kg). All Vikings featured a tailwheel undercarriage.

The 58th Viking (c/n 158) became the prototype of the military Valetta, of which 262 were produced for the RAF. When production of this strengthened but externally similar type ended in 1952, a flying classroom version with tricycle undercarriage was already being delivered to the Royal Air Force (RAF), called the Varsity. All but one of those entered RAF service, the other example going to the Swedish Air Force. The production of 161 Varsities kept the Hurn works busy until January 1954, and they enjoyed a long service life. Six examples are preserved, including at Brooklands Museum, and the Newark Air Museum.

== Operational history ==
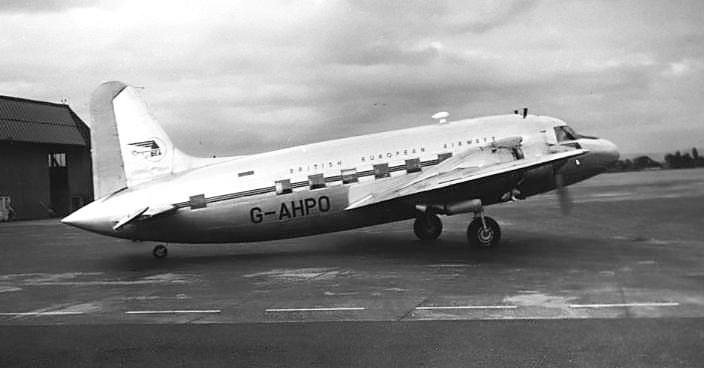
BEA Vickers Viking 1B G-AHPO "Venturer" at Manchester Airport in 1952

The first Viking was flown from Vickers' flight test airfield at Wisley, Surrey, by chief test pilot Joseph "Mutt" Summers on 22 June 1945 and the third aircraft built was delivered to BOAC at Hurn near Bournemouth on 20 April 1946. Upon the delivery of nine examples to BOAC for development flying, including the two remaining prototypes, British European Airways (BEA) was established on 1 August 1946 to operate airliners within Europe and these first VC.1 Vikings were transferred to the new airline.

After a trial flight from Northolt to Oslo on 20 August 1946 by the newly formed BEA, the first regular Viking scheduled service commenced between Northolt and Copenhagen Airport on 1 September 1946.

In all 163 Vikings were built. The initials "VC" stood for Vickers Commercial, echoing the "VC" precedent set by the earlier Vimy Commercial of 1919. Vickers soon ceased to use the 'VC' letters, instead using type numbers in the 49x and 600 series, which indicated the specific customer airline.

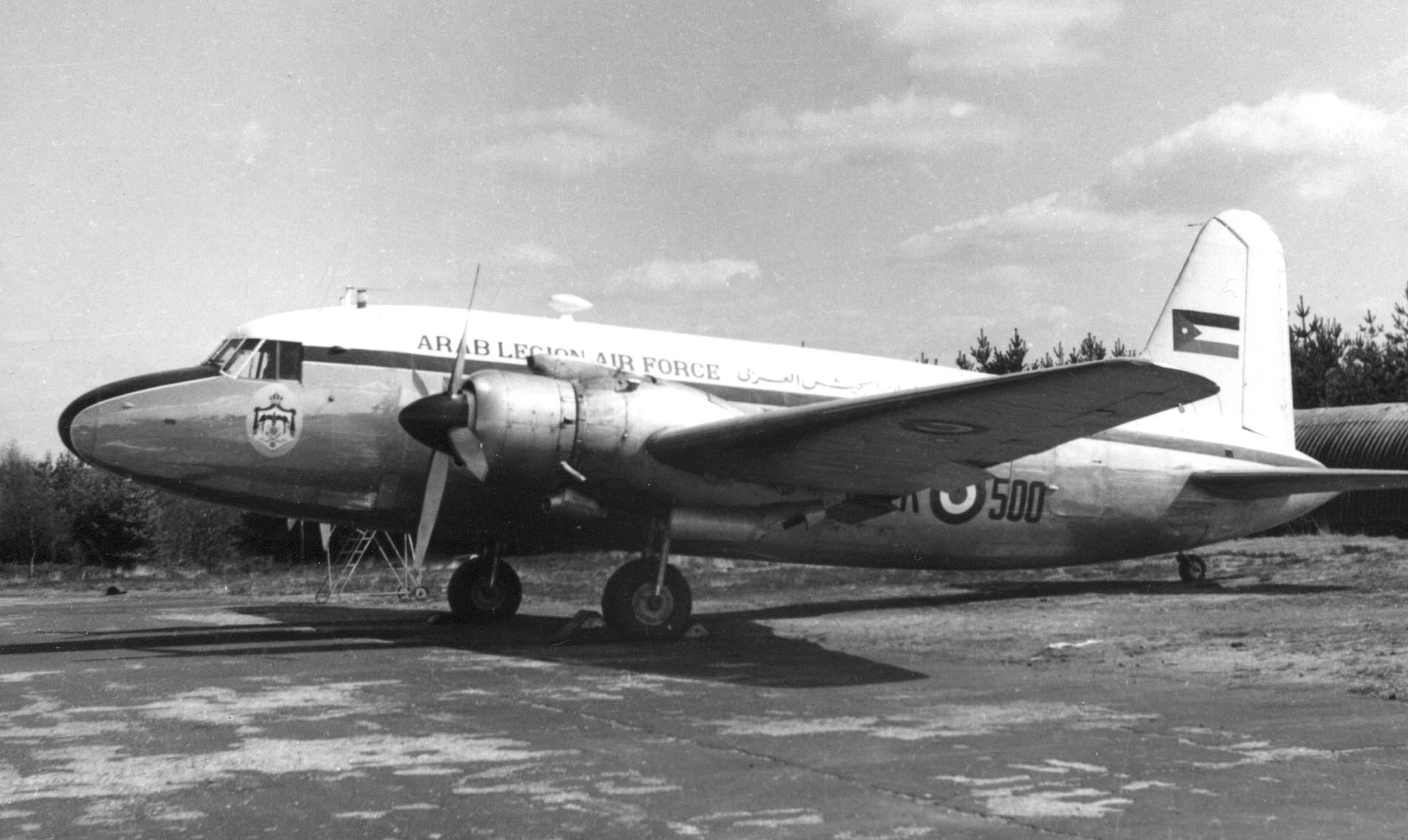
Viking 1B of the Arab Legion Air Force (Jordan) at Blackbushe Airport, Hants, in 1955

BEA operated their large fleet of Vikings on many European and UK trunk routes for eight years. From 1951, the remaining fleet was modified with 36, instead of 27 seats, and named the "Admiral Class". BEA operated the Viking until late 1954, when the last was displaced by the more modern and pressurised Airspeed Ambassador and Vickers Viscount.

BEA sold their Vikings to several UK independent airlines for use on their growing scheduled and charter route networks. Some were sold to other European operators. An ex-BEA Viking 1B was fitted out as a VIP aircraft for the Arab Legion Air Force, mainly for the use of the King of Jordan. Most Vikings had been retired from service by the mid-1960s and there are now only six extant worldwide with two surviving examples in the UK, both being under long-term major restoration.

== Variants ==
Viking
Prototypes with two 1,675 hp (1,250 kW) Bristol Hercules 130 engines, three built.
Viking 1A
Initial production version with geodetic wings and two 1,690 hp (1,261 kW) Bristol Hercules 630 engines.
Viking 1
Production aircraft with stressed skin mainplanes and two 1,690 hp (1,261 kW) Bristol Hercules 634 engines.
Viking 1B
Viking 1 with "long nose", 113 built.
Nene Viking
One Viking 1B aircraft modified for trials with two 5,000 lbf (22.3 kN) Rolls-Royce Nene I turbojets.
Viking C2
British military designation of the Viking 1; VIP transport aircraft for the King's Flight of the RAF.
Valetta C1 & C2
Modified design with strengthened floor and large freight door.
Varsity T1
Highly modified Valetta design with tricycle undercarriage for navigation and crew training.

=== Type numbers ===
Type 491
First prototype
Type 495
Second prototype
Type 496
Third prototype
Type 498
Viking 1A for British European Airways. Three later to Argentine Air Force.
Type 604
Viking 1B for Indian National Airways with two Hercules 634 engines.
Type 607
Valetta prototype for Ministry of Supply with two Hercules 230 engines.
Type 610
Viking 1B for British European Airways.
Type 613
Projected fuel transport variant, not built.
Type 614
Viking 1 for British European Airways.
Type 615
Viking 1 for the Argentine government with two Hercules 634 engines.
Type 616
Viking 1 for Central African Airways.
Type 618
Nene Viking for Ministry of Supply.
Type 620
Viking 1 for the Argentine government with two Hercules 630 engines.
Type 621
Viking C2 for the Royal Air Force with two Hercules 130 engines.
Type 623
Viking C2 for the Royal Air Force with two Hercules 134 engines. Two ordered for use by the King's Flight for a royal tour of South Africa, one aircraft for the King and one for the Queen.
Type 624
Viking C2 for the Royal Air Force with two Hercules 134 engines. One ordered for use by the King's Flight for a royal tour of South Africa for use by the state officials in 21-seat configuration.
Type 626
Viking C2 for the Royal Air Force with two Hercules 134 engines. One ordered for use by the King's Flight for a royal tour of South Africa as a mobile workshop support aircraft.
Type 627
Viking 1B for Airwork Limited.
Type 628
Viking 1B for DDL with two Hercules 634 engines.
Type 631
Projected 34-seat variant, not built.
Type 632
Viking 1B for Air India with two Hercules 634 engines.
Type 634
Viking 1B for Aer Lingus with two Hercules 634 engines.
Type 635
Viking 1B for South African Airways with two Hercules 634 engines.
Type 636
Viking 1B demonstrator.
Type 637
Valetta C1 for the Royal Air Force with two Hercules 230 engines.
Type 639
Viking 1 for Hunting Air Transport.
Type 641
Viking 1 for Suidair International
Type 643
Viking 1 for Suidair International with two Hercules 630 engines.
Type 644
Viking 1B for Iraqi Airways.
Type 649
Viking 1B for Pakistan Air Force with two Hercules 634 engines.
Type 651
Valetta C1 for the Royal Air Force with two Hercules 634 engines.
Type 657
Viking 1A conversions from Type 498 for BSAAC.

== Operators ==
=== Civil operators ===
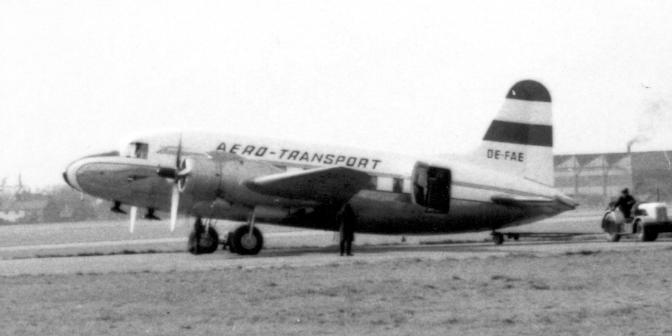
Vickers Viking 1 of Aero-Transport (Austria) in 1958

Argentina

- Aerolíneas Argentinas
- Argentine Civil Aeronautics Board
- Flota Aérea Mercante Argentina
- LADE

Austria

- Aero Transport

Belgium

- Aviameer Airlines

Denmark

- DDL

Egypt

- Misrair

France

- Airnautic
- Air Dauphine
- Air Inter
- Air Sahara
- Europe Aero Service
- Transportes Aeriens Reunis

Germany

- Aero Express Flug
- Aerotour
- Colombus Luftreederei
- Condor
- Deutsche Flugdienst
- LTU International
- Transavia Flug

India

- Air India
- Indian Airlines
- Indian National Airways

Iraq

- Iraqi Airways
- Iraq Petroleum Transport Company

Ireland

- Aer Lingus

Kuwait

- Kuwait Oil Company

Mexico

- Bernado Pasquelle
- Government of Mexico

Portugal (Portuguese India)

- Transportes Aéreos da Índia Portuguesa

Pakistan

- Governor General of Pakistan. Personal plane of Quaid E Azam Muhammad Ali Jinnah

South Africa

- Protea Airways
- South African Airways
- Suldair International Airways
- Trek Airways
- United Airways

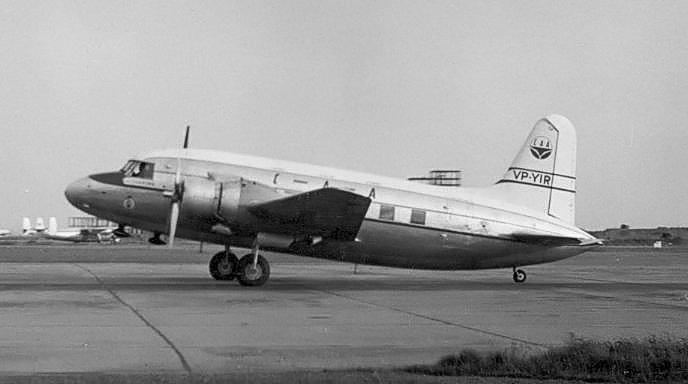
Central African Airways Vickers Viking at London Heathrow in 1953

Southern Rhodesia

- Central African Airways

Switzerland

- Balair

Trinidad and Tobago

- British West Indian Airways

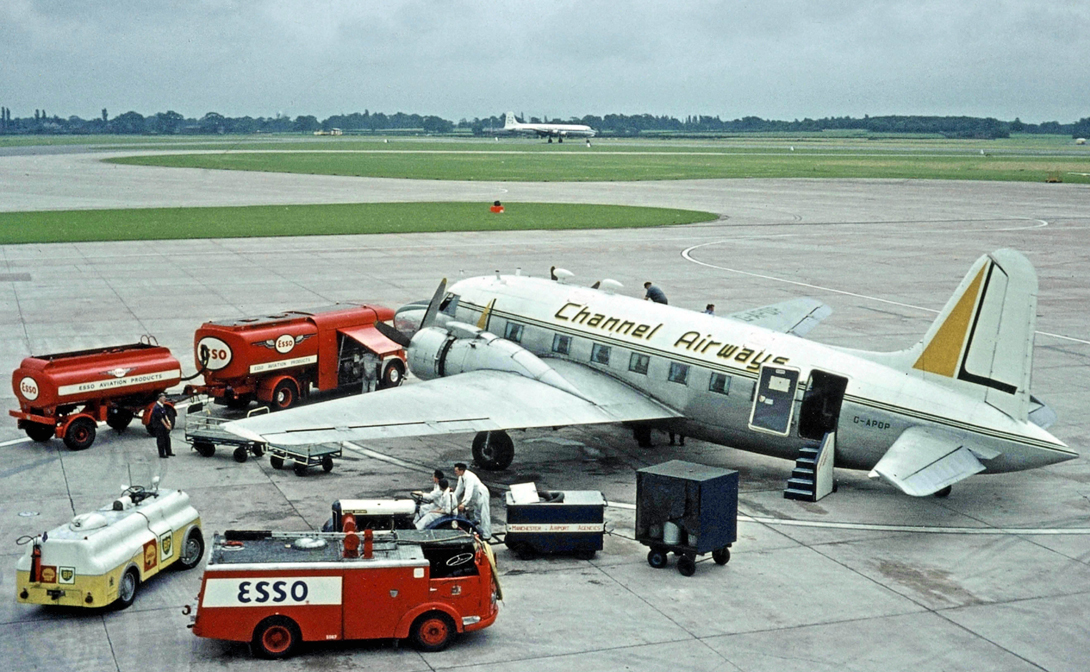
Viking C.2 of Channel Airways at Manchester Ringway in 1964

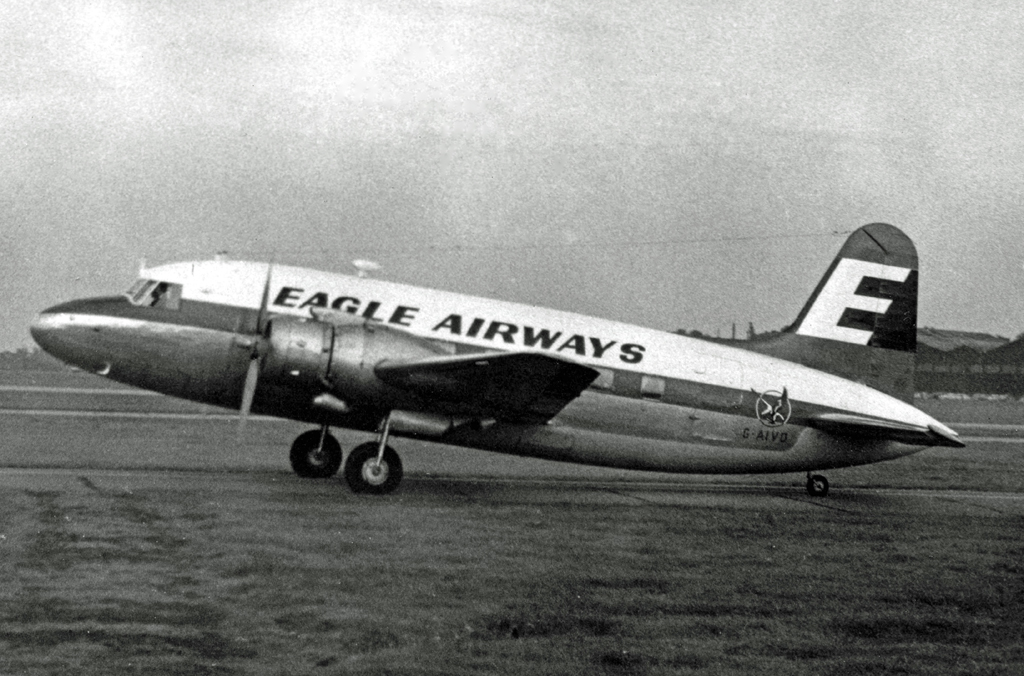
Viking 1B of Eagle Airways at Manchester Ringway in 1959

United Kingdom

- African Air Safaris
- Air Ferry
- Air Safaris
- Airwork Services
- Autair
- Bembridge Air Hire Limited
- BKS Air Transport
- Blue-Air
- British European Airways
- British Overseas Airways Corporation (used only by BOAC development flight)
- Eagle Aviation/Eagle Airways
- British International Airlines
- British Nederland Airservices
- Channel Airways
- Continental Air Services
- Crewsair Limited
- Decca Navigator Company
- Dragon Airways
- Eros Airlines (UK)
- Falcon Airways
- Field Aircraft Services
- First Air Trading Company
- Hunting Air Transport
- Hunting-Clan Air Transport
- Invicta Airways / Invicta International Airways
- Independent Air Transport
- James Stuart Travel Limited
- Maitland Drewery Aviation
- Meredith Air Transport
- Orion Airways
- Overseas Aviation
- Pegasus Airlines
- Tradair Limited
- Trans World Charter
- Vendair Limited

=== Military operators ===
Argentina

- Argentine Air Force - 30 aircraft. One (T-64, ex LV-XFM) used as presidential aircraft from 1948 to 1952.

Australia

- Royal Australian Air Force - One Viking C2 in service from 1947 to 1951.
  - No. 2 Squadron RAAF
  - No. 34 Squadron RAAF

Jordan

- Arab Legion Air Force
- Royal Jordanian Air Force

Pakistan

- Pakistan Air Force

United Kingdom

- Royal Air Force
  - Empire Test Pilots' School
  - The King's Flight, RAF

== Accidents and incidents ==
Of the 163 aircraft built 56 aircraft were lost in accidents – the following were some notable accidents:

- 5 April 1948: G-AIVP operated by British European Airways collided with a Soviet Yak-3 near Berlin, 15 killed.
- 21 April 1948: British European Airways Flight S200P (G-AIVE) crashed on approach to Glasgow-Renfrew Airport. No one was killed but 14 were injured.
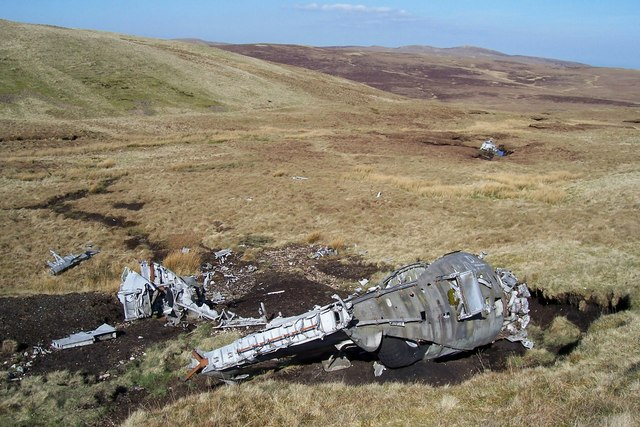
  Wreckage of G-AIVE at the crash site of British European Airways Flight S200P, photographed in situ in 2007
- 8 February 1949: OY-DLU operated by Det Danske Luftfartselskab (DDL) crashed into the sea off Copenhagen, Denmark, with the loss of all 27 occupants.
- 31 October 1950: G-AHPN operated by British European Airways crashed during a Ground Control Approach landing in bad visibility (40–50 yards (37–46 m)) at London Northolt airport, England. The pilot failed to overshoot and 25 passengers and three crew died. It was subsequently recommended that it be an offence for aircraft to go below a minimum height when ground visibility was low.
- 17 February 1952: G-AHPI operated by Hunting Air Travel flew into the La Cinta mountain range, Italy, with the loss of all 31 occupants.
- 5 January 1953: G-AJDL operated by British European Airways crashed on approach at Belfast-Nutts Corner Airport, Northern Ireland, three crew and 24 passengers died.
- 12 August 1953: G-AIVG operated by British European Airways crashed on take-off at Le Bourget-Paris, France, four crew and 30 passengers injured but survived.
- 1 May 1957: G-AJBO operated by Eagle Aviation crashed after engine failure near Blackbushe Airport, England, five crew and 29 passengers died.
- 2 September 1958: G-AIJE operated by Independent Air Travel crashed into a house as the flight crew were trying to return to London Heathrow Airport after reporting engine problems. All three crew died and four on the ground also died.
- 9 August 1961: G-AHPM operated by Cunard Eagle Airways crashed into a mountainside near Holta on approach to Stavanger Airport, Sola in Norway with the loss of all 39 occupants. The Norwegian report on the incident concluded that the pilot was off-course for unknown reasons. The 50th anniversary was marked by a book published in summer 2011, The Lanfranc Boys by Rosalind Jones, sister of Quentin Green, one of the victims. The aircraft carried 34 boys and 2 members of staff from The Archbishop Lanfranc School in Croydon.
- 11 September 1963: F-BJER operated by Airnautic crashed into a mountain in the Pyrenees with the loss of all 40 occupants, the worst Viking accident.

== Aircraft on display ==
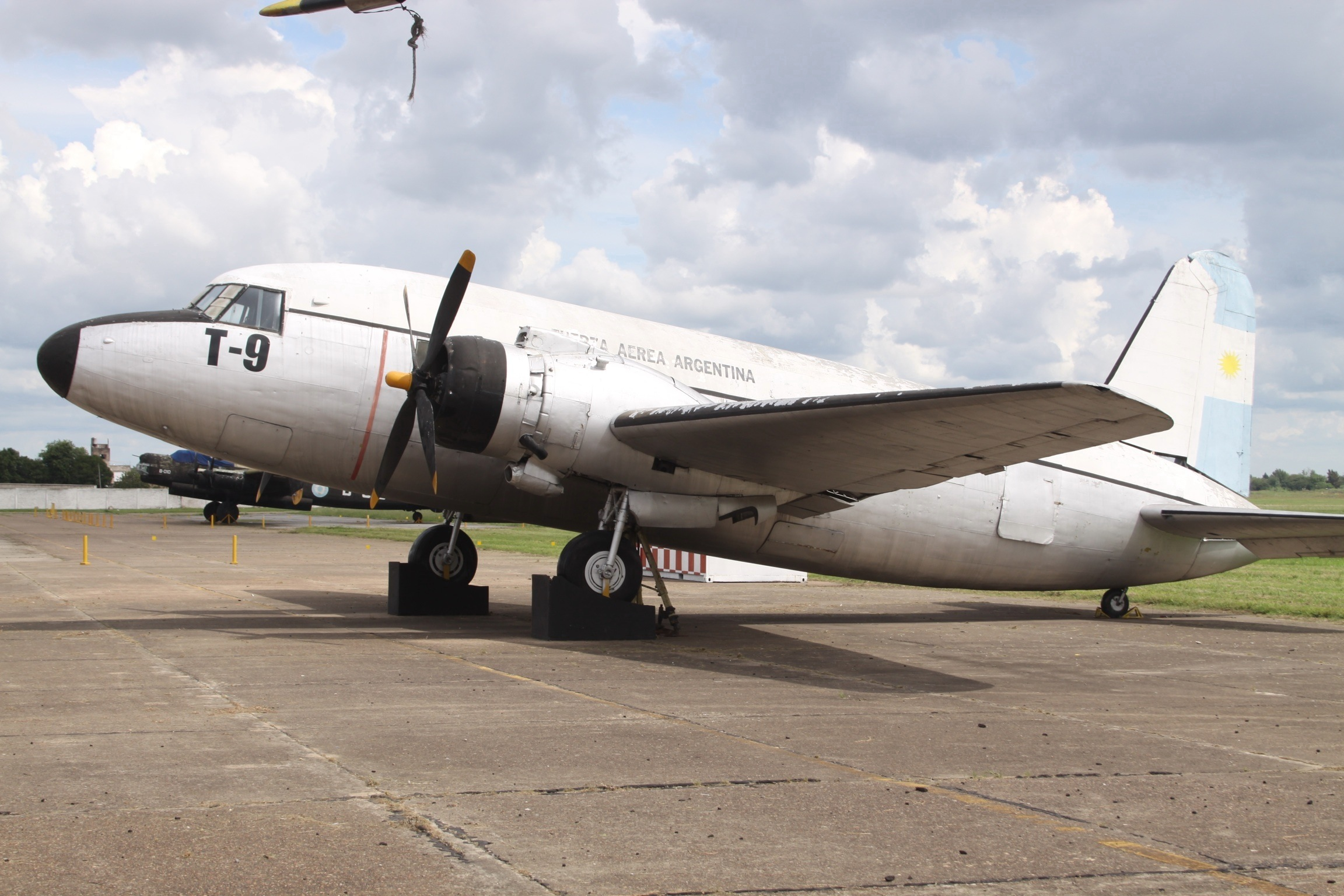
T-9, ex Argentine Air Force, Museo Nacional de Aeronáutica de Argentina

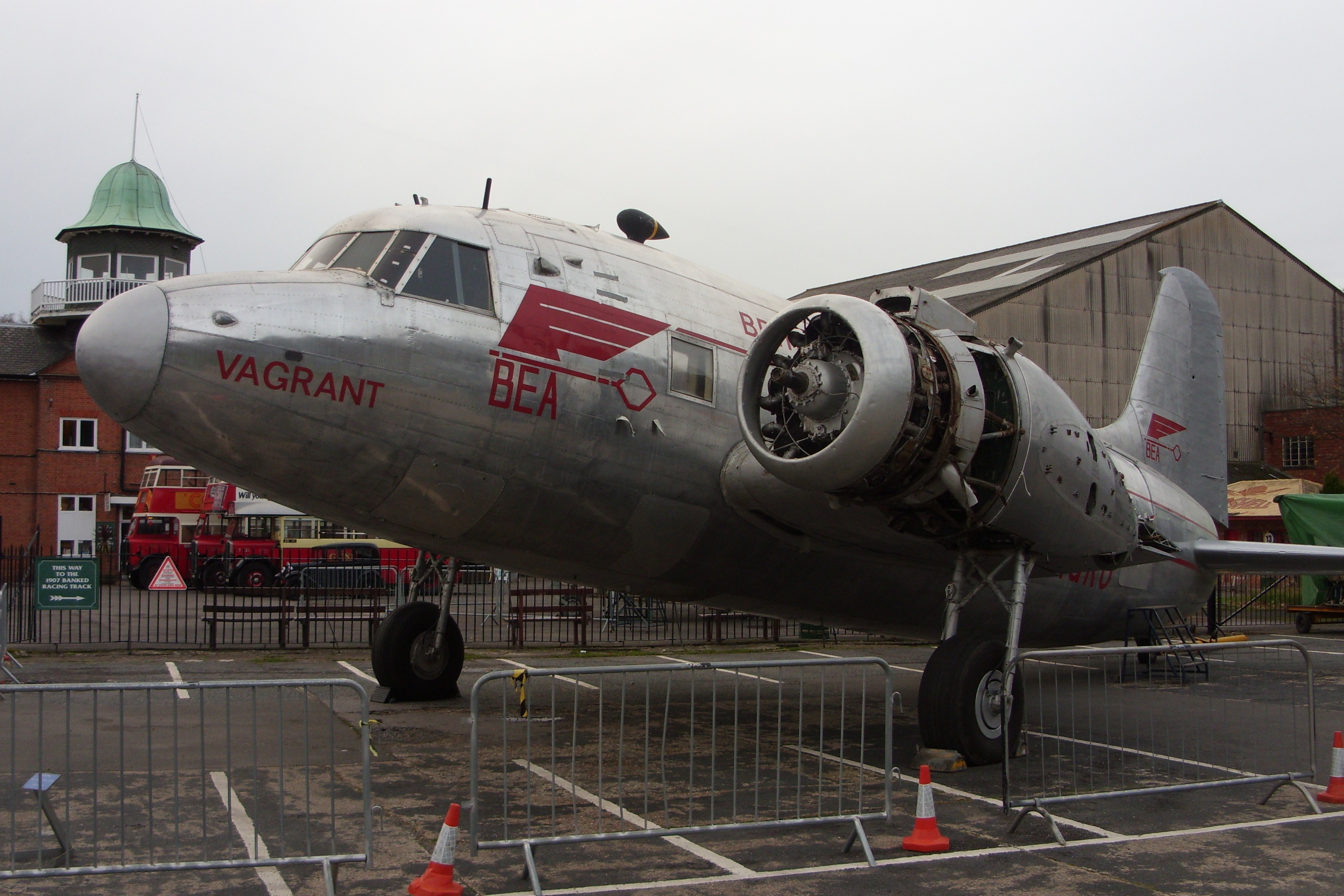
G-AGRU under restoration at the Brooklands Museum in 2009

Of the 163 Vikings produced, only six survive today; five can be found in museums around the world, while a sixth airframe was stored at an airfield near Vienna in Austria until dismantled in late April 2023. Acquired by the Blackbushe Heritage Trust, it is returning to the UK in early May for restoration and display at Blackbushe Airport in Surrey.

Argentina

- T-9 – Viking 1B on static display at the Museo Nacional de Aeronáutica de Argentina in Morón, Buenos Aires.

Pakistan

- J-750 – Viking 1B on static display at the Pakistan Air Force Museum in Karachi, Sindh.

Switzerland

- G-AIVG – Viking 1B under restoration to static display by the Vintage Aircraft Club at EuroAirport Basel Mulhouse Freiburg in Basel. It crashed at Le Bourget Airport on 12 August 1958. It uses undercarriage and other parts from Vickers Valetta VX577 destroyed by fire 24 January 1997.

South Africa

- ZS-DKH – Viking 1A under restoration to static display at the South African Airways Museum Society in Germiston, Gauteng.

United Kingdom

- G-AGRU – Viking 1A under major long-term restoration while on outdoor display at the Brooklands Museum in Weybridge, Surrey.
- G-AGRW – Viking 1A delivered by the Blackbushe Heritage Trust to Blackbushe Airport, Hampshire, on 2 May 2023 from long term outdoor storage stored outdoors at Bad Vöslau airfield, Austria, for major restoration and public display at this former Viking engineering maintenance base.

== Specifications (Viking 1B) ==
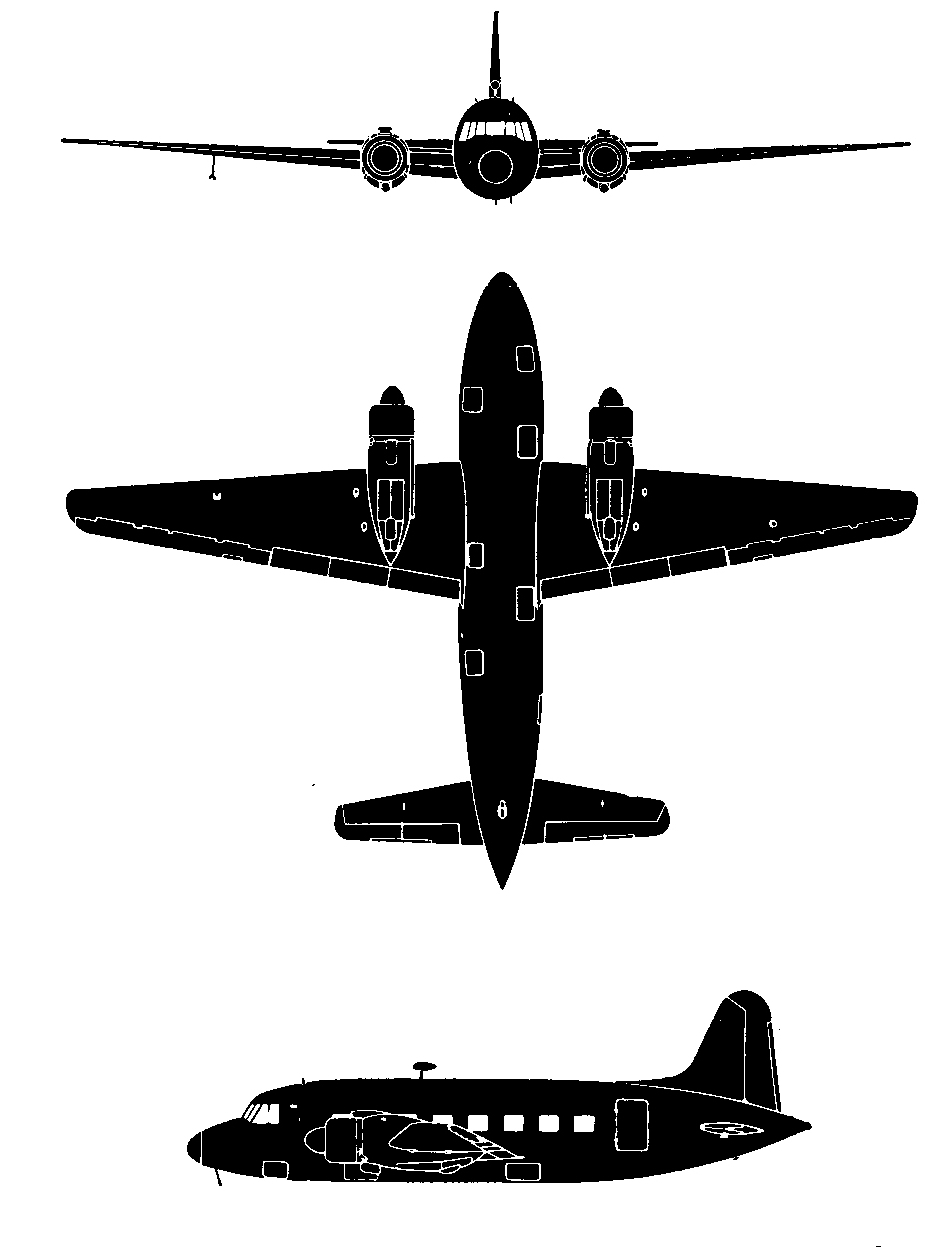
Vickers Viking 1B

Data from Vickers Aircraft since 1908

General characteristics

- Length: 65 ft 2 in (19.86 m)
- Wingspan: 89 ft 3 in (27.20 m)
- Height: 19 ft 7 in (5.97 m)
- Wing area: 882 sq ft (81.9 m^{2})
- Empty weight: 23,000 lb (10,433 kg)
- Max takeoff weight: 34,000 lb (15,422 kg)
- Fuel capacity: 740 imp gal (890 US gal; 3,400 L)
- Powerplant: 2 × Bristol Hercules 634 14-cylinder two-row radial engines, 1,690 hp (1,260 kW) each
- Propellers: 4-bladed de Havilland or Rotol constant-speed propellers, 13 ft 3 in (4.04 m) diameter

Performance

- Maximum speed: 263 mph (423 km/h, 229 kn) at 1,000 ft (300 m)
- Cruise speed: 210 mph (340 km/h, 180 kn)
- Range: 1,700 mi (2,700 km, 1,500 nmi) at 210 mph (180 kn; 340 km/h)
- Service ceiling: 25,000 ft (7,600 m)
- Rate of climb: 1,500 ft/min (7.6 m/s)
- Take-off distance to 50 ft (15 m): 2,550 ft (780 m)
- Landing distance from 50 ft (15 m): 3,900 ft (1,200 m)

== See also ==
Related development

- Vickers Valetta
- Vickers Varsity
- Vickers Wellington

Aircraft of comparable role, configuration, and era

- Douglas DC-3
