= Irish Law (mountain) =

Hill in North Ayrshire, Scotland

Coordinates: 55°47′37″N 4°46′38″W

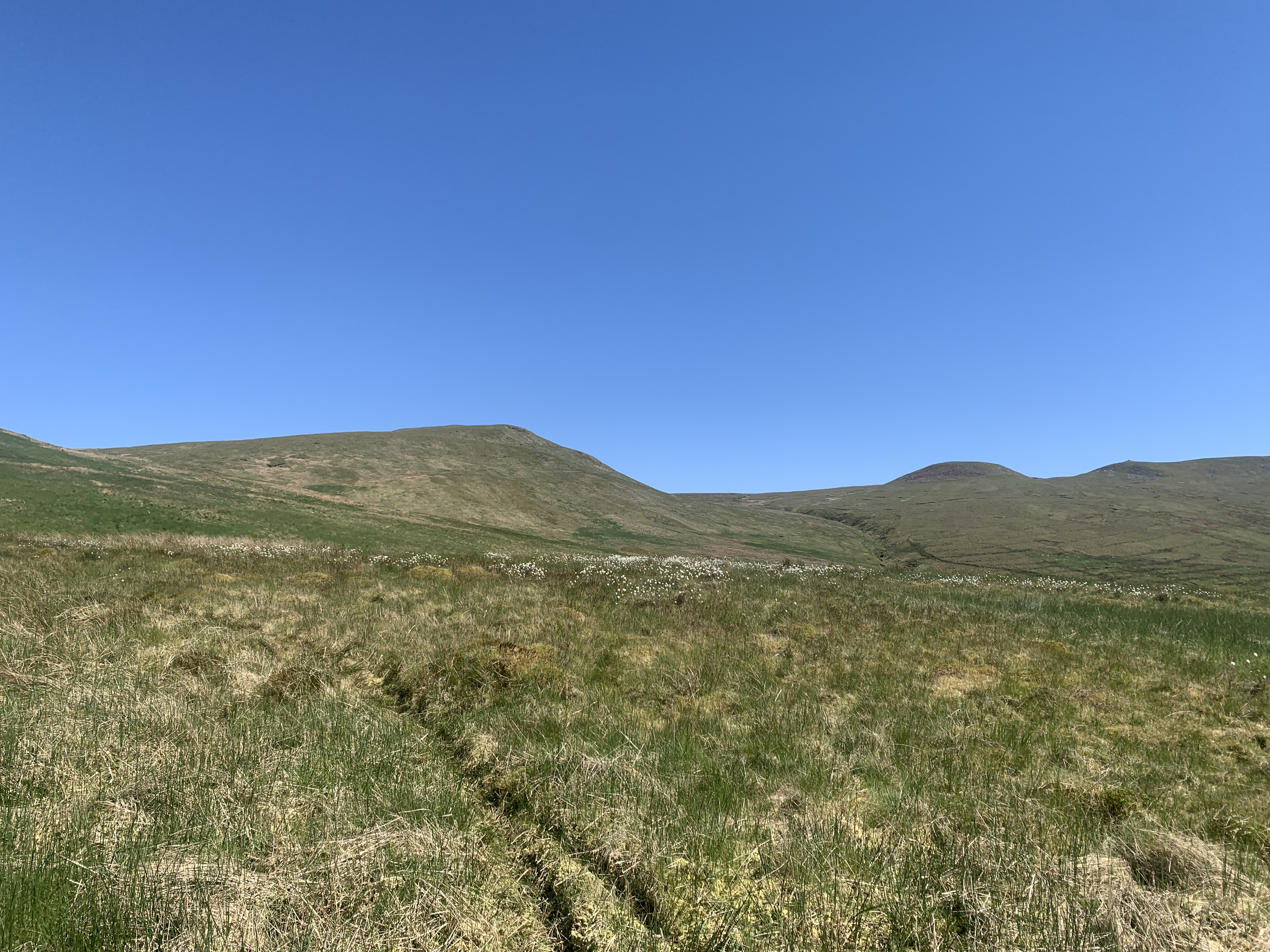

Highest point
- Elevation: 484 m (1,588 ft)
- Prominence: 80 m (260 ft)
- Listing: Knockside Hills

Naming
- Language of name: English

Geography
- Location: North Ayrshire, Scotland
- Topo map: OS Landranger 63

Geology
- Mountain type: TuMP

Climbing
- Easiest route: Turn off Largs to A760 access road towards the hill.

Irish Law is a mountain located in North Ayrshire, Scotland near the town of Largs. It has an elevation of 484 metres (1,588 ft) and a prominence of 80 metres (260 ft), meaning it is categorised as a TuMP.

It has a complex geology, consisting of igneous rocks and vent.

Walkers frequently visit Irish Law to see the wreckage of the downed plane British European Airways Flight S200P which is located on the north side of the hill's slopes.

The mountain has no paths leading to it, but it is approximately 1 mile from an access road running from Largs to the A760 road.

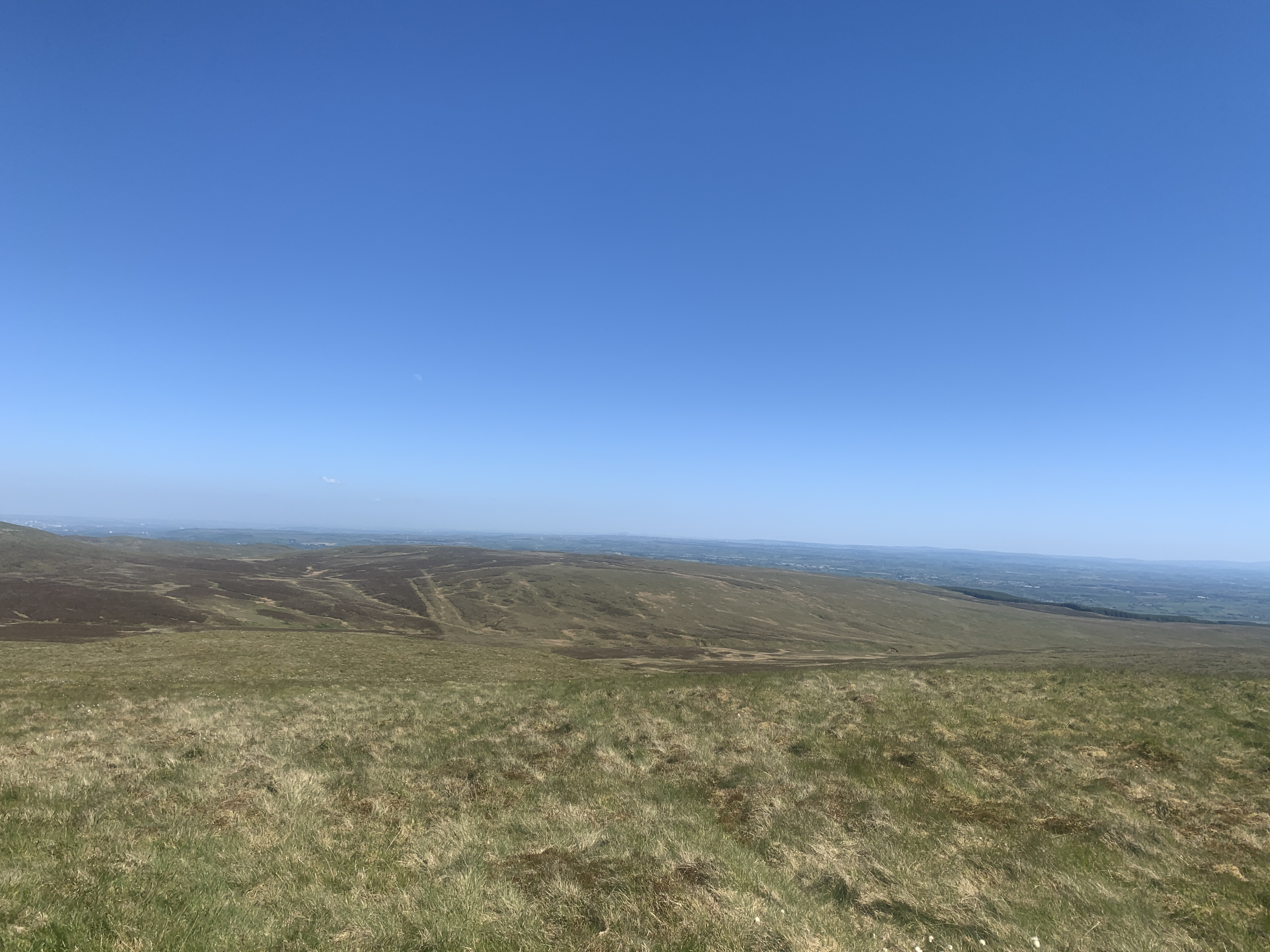
View from the top of Irish Law
