= 1958 Independent Air Travel Vickers Viking crash =

1958 aviation accident

1958 London Vickers Viking accident
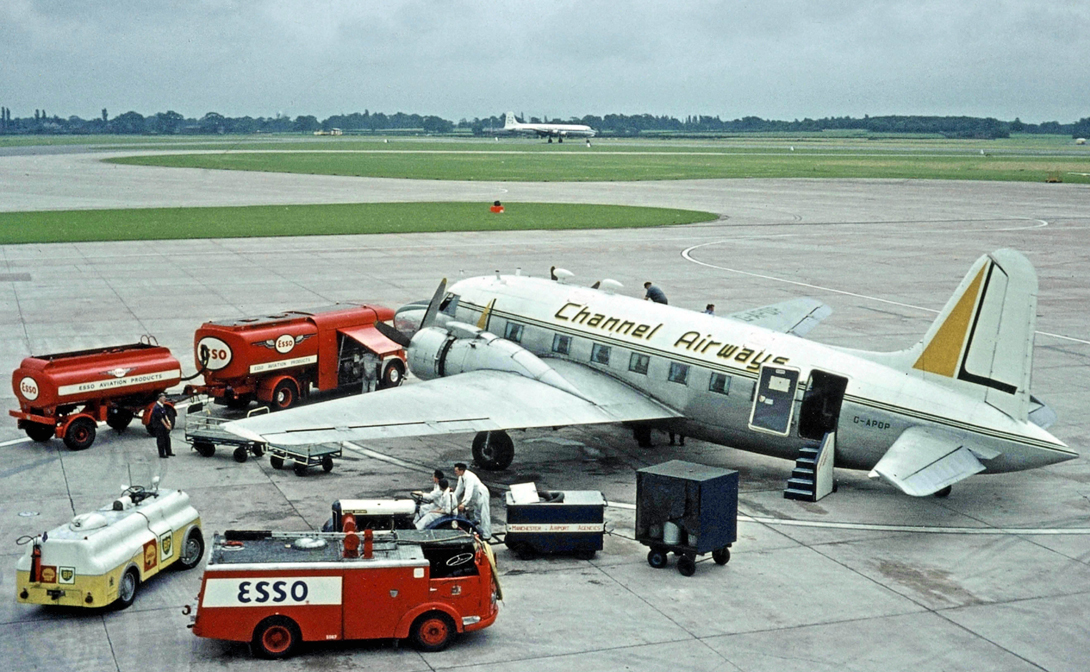
- A Vickers Viking, similar to the aircraft involved in the accident

Accident
- Date: 2 September 1958
- Summary: Pilot error following engine failure
- Site: Southall; 51.5196°N 0.3718°W
- Total fatalities: 7
- Total survivors: 0

Aircraft
- Aircraft type: Vickers VC.1 Viking
- Operator: Independent Air Travel
- Registration: G-AIJE
- Flight origin: London Heathrow Airport
- Stopover: Nice
- 1st stopover: Brindisi
- Last stopover: Athens
- Destination: Tel Aviv
- Occupants: 3
- Crew: 3
- Fatalities: 3
- Survivors: 0

Ground casualties
- Ground fatalities: 4

On 2 September 1958, an Independent Air Travel Vickers VC.1 Viking (registration G-AIJE), with three crew members aboard and loaded with two Bristol Proteus turboprop engines, crashed after taking off from London Heathrow Airport, en route to Tel Aviv via Nice, Brindisi and Athens.

== Accident ==
The aircraft took off from Heathrow at 05:54 GMT but minutes into the flight the flight crew reported engine problems and requested a return to Blackbushe Airport. The crew was cleared by Air Traffic Control to descend to 3000 feet, but they were unable to maintain this altitude and continued descending. A Mayday call was made from the aircraft at 06:32 GMT, shortly before it crashed into a row of houses on Kelvin Gardens, Southall, Middlesex. The aircraft burst into flames on impact, killing all three crew members as well as four people on the ground, a mother and three children. Witnesses reported that they saw one of the crew waving from inside the aircraft just before it crashed.

== Cause ==
According to the Public inquiry which investigated the accident, the probable cause of the accident was that "the aircraft was allowed to lose height and flying speed with the result that the pilot was no longer able to exercise asymmetric control." While the reasons for the loss of power and the subsequent loss of height and speed were not known, the public inquiry found a number of serious flaws in the operation of Independent Air Travel and the maintenance of the aircraft. Maintenance had been carried out on one of the aircraft propellers at Heathrow on the night before the accident by personnel who were not qualified to carry out the work. The aircraft was overloaded and the pilot had not had adequate rest, having effectively been on duty for 31 hours 30 minutes compared with the 16 hours required by the regulations (This took advantage of a loophole in regulations that allowed crew to carry out flights during "rest" hours if no passengers or cargo was carried.). Check flights, which should have tested the pilot's ability to handle the aircraft at high weights and with one engine out were found to be "perfunctory" and did not adequately prove the pilot's ability to handle the aircraft with one engine failed.

The report stated that "it is quite clear...that the policy of this company was to keep its aircraft in the air at all costs and without any real regard for the requirements of maintenance." and that "it is not difficult for employers who are not unduly concerned to observe the regulations, to drive their employees and . . . to induce them to disregard the regulations designed to ensure safety in the air."

== Aftermath ==
Brian Gibbons, a 14-year-old schoolboy, was awoken by the crash, which ignited a fire in his house. Despite receiving severe burns to his body he managed to save himself and his infant nephew by dropping the baby, and then himself jumping, from his window into the arms of rescuers. For his heroism he received the civilian class of the George Medal from Elizabeth II in 1959 making him the youngest male to have received the award. The citation read:

Brian GIBBONS,

Schoolboy,
Southall,

Middlesex.

An aircraft crashed into some houses causing severe damage and setting the houses on fire.

Brian Gibbons was sleeping with his nephew in the front bedroom of one of the wrecked houses. He was awakened by the crash to find the room full of smoke. He wrapped his nephew in a blanket and tried to carry him down the stairs but was driven back by the flames and sustained severe burns on the chest He went back to the bedroom, which had by then caught fire, put his nephew on the bed, and opened the window. People in the front garden shouted to him to jump, but he turned back into the room for his nephew who had, in the meantime, fallen to the floor. The room was full of smoke and thinking the child had gone to the stairs, Gibbons went to the landing to look for him despite the appalling risk he ran in doing so. He was again severely burnt, this time on the face and hands, and was partly overcome By fumes. He re-entered the bedroom and stumbled over the child on the floor. He picked him up, carried him to the window and pushed him out. The child was caught by bystanders. Gibbons managed to get on to the window sill, dropped out and was caught by a man standing below. As he did this all the skin came away from the boy's chest Brian Gibbons' action in deliberately turning his back on safety and searching for his young nephew, showed coolness and courage and a complete lack of panic.
