= British European Airways Flight S200P =

1948 aviation accident

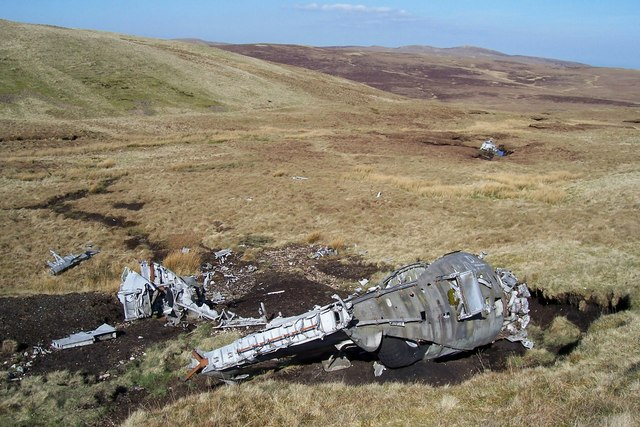
- Wreckage left in situ after the crash

Accident
- Date: 21 April 1948
- Summary: Controlled flight into terrain (CFIT)
- Site: Irish Law Mountain, North Ayrshire, Scotland, United Kingdom; 55.808778°N 4.780862°W

Aircraft
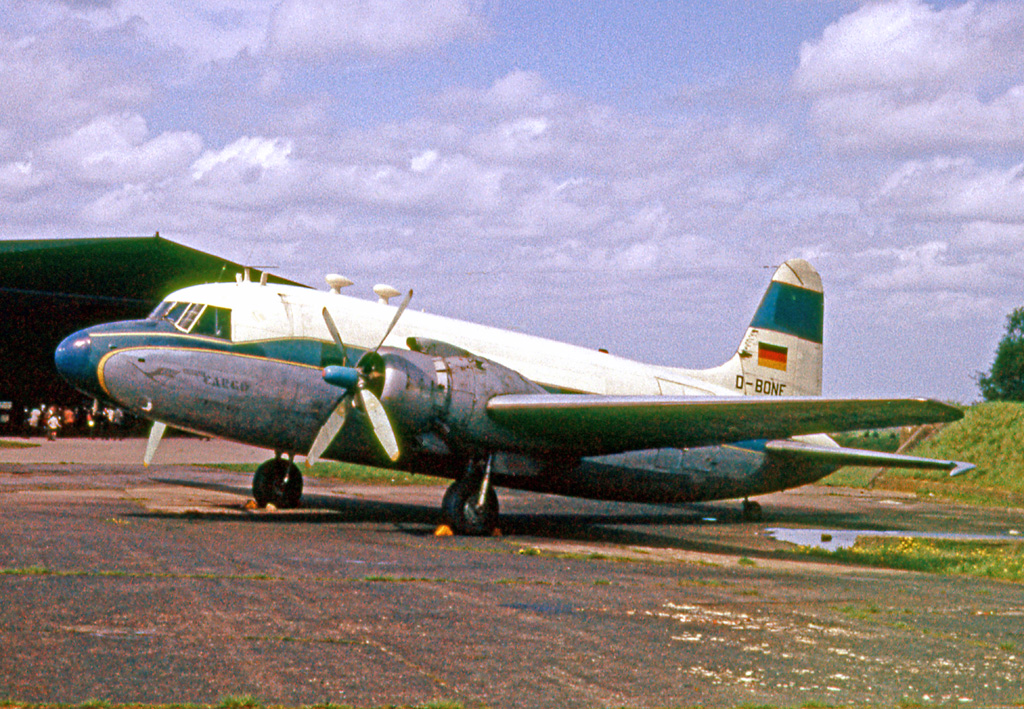
- A Vickers 610 Viking 1B, similar to the accident aircraft
- Aircraft type: Vickers 610 Viking 1B
- Operator: British European Airways
- Registration: G-AIVE
- Flight origin: London-Northolt Airport
- Destination: Glasgow-Renfrew Airport
- Passengers: 16
- Crew: 4
- Fatalities: 0
- Injuries: 13
- Survivors: 20

British European Airways Flight S200P was a short-haul flight in the United Kingdom from London-Northolt Airport to Glasgow-Renfrew Airport. On 21 April 1948, while on approach to Renfrew, a Vickers VC.1 Viking, registration G-AIVE, crashed into Irish Law Mountain in Ayrshire, Scotland. No one died in the accident, but 13 of the 20 passengers and crew were injured, and the aircraft was damaged beyond repair.

== Accident ==
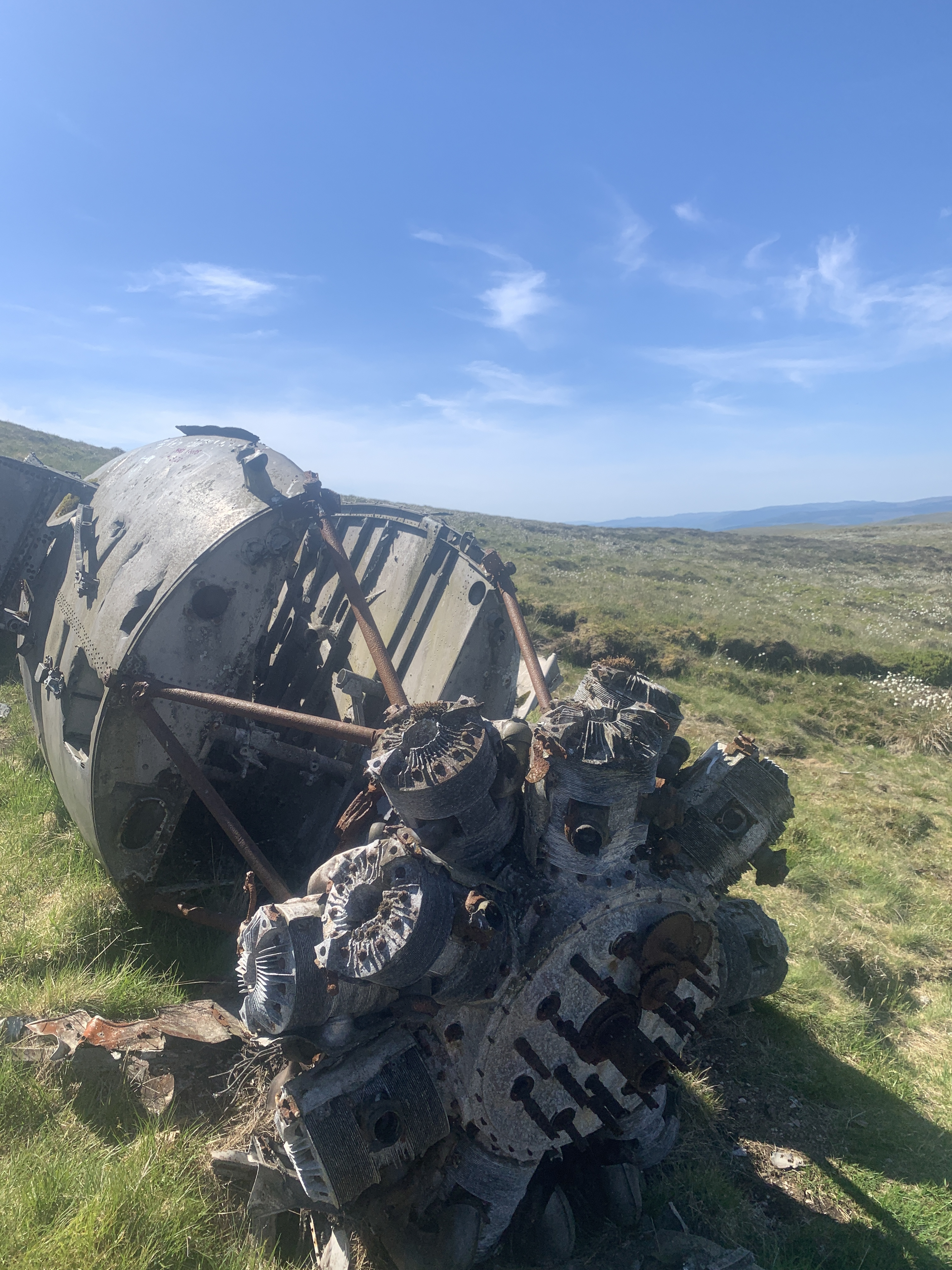
This photo, taken in May 2020, shows the leftover wreckage of the fuselage on the slope of Irish Law mountain.

Flight S200P had taken off 19:09 British Summer Time (18:09 GMT). After a one-hour flight, air traffic control at Glasgow-Renfrew cleared it for a standard beam approach into the airport. The last radio contact was at 20:01, when the crew requested confirmation that the outer marker was operative. As the aircraft prepared for its approach to the airport, it hit a hill nose-first and broke into 3 parts; the engine and the left wing also broke off. Although the plane burst into flames, all 20 passengers and crew escaped, and all survived. Thirteen people were injured in the accident.

== Cause ==
An investigation into the crash found the cause to be pilot error. Failure to receive the outer marker beacon signal (probably due to a fault that had developed in the receiver) was a contributory factor.

== Crash site today ==
Some remnants of G-AIVE remain on the hill at Irish Law Mountain, including the engines, landing gear, and parts of the left and right wings.
