= Bristol Theseus =

1940s British turboprop aircraft engine

Theseus
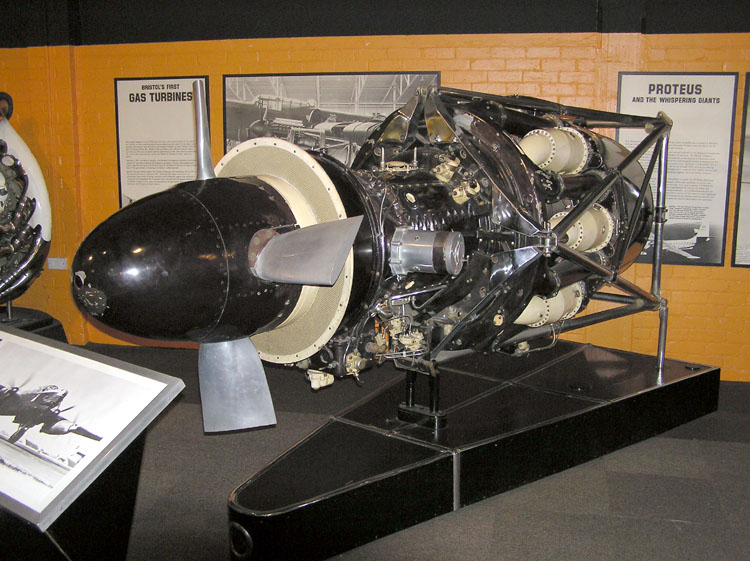
- Preserved Bristol Theseus
- Type: Turboprop
- Manufacturer: Bristol Siddeley
- First run: 18 July 1945
- Major applications: Handley Page Hermes

The Theseus was the Bristol Aeroplane Company's first attempt at a gas-turbine engine design. A turboprop delivering just over 2,000 hp (1,500 kW) was chosen rather than compete with companies that were already developing turbojets. A heat exchanger to transfer waste heat from the exhaust to the compressor exit was necessary to meet a requirement for a fuel consumption comparable to a piston engine. However, the heat exchanger was abandoned after tests showed that it had a high pressure loss and only produced a fuel saving of 8%. Furthermore, overall performance was reduced

As well as being one of the first engines to feature a free propeller turbine, the Theseus was the first turboprop in the world to pass a type test in January 1947. Following 156 hours of ground runs and the receipt of a test certificate from the Ministry of Supply on 28 January 1947, two Theseus engines were fitted in the outer positions of a four-engined Avro Lincoln for air tests. After ground and taxying test the Lincoln first flew on 17 February 1947.

The engine was also installed in two Handley Page Hermes 5 development aircraft.

It was soon superseded by the Proteus design with more power.

== Applications ==
- Avro Theseus Lincoln
- Handley Page Hermes 5

== Bristol Theseus on public display ==
East Midlands Aeropark Castle Donington.

== Variants ==
Theseus Series TH.11
Variant without heat exchanger. Ran for first time 18 July 1945
Theseus Series TH.21
Variant with heat exchanger. Ran for first time in December 1945
Theseus 502

== Specifications (Theseus Th.21) ==
Data from Aircraft Engines of the world 1946

==== General characteristics ====
- Type: Mixed compressor turboprop with matrix heat exchanger
- Length: 106 in (2.69 m)
- Diameter: 48 in (1.22 m)
- Dry weight: 2,310 lb (1,050 kg)

==== Components ====
- Compressor: 8-stage axial + 1-stage centrifugal compressors feeding the combustion chambers through a heat exchanger
- Combustors: 8 x stainless steel can combustion chambers
- Turbine: 2-stage axial + 1-stage axial free turbine driving the propeller
- Fuel type: Kerosene (R.D.E. / F / KER)
- Oil system: pressure feed to bearings, dry sump, 40 S.U. secs (13 cSt) (Intavia 620) grade oil

==== Performance ====
- Maximum power output: 1,950 bhp (1,450 kW)@Sea Level Static, ISA plus 500 lbf (2.22 kN) residual thrust
- Overall pressure ratio: 5:1
- Air mass flow: 30.0 lb/s (13.61 kg/s)
- Specific fuel consumption: 0.57 lb/equiv. hph (kg/equiv. kWh)@ Max Power, 300mph, Sea Level, ISA
- Specific Fuel Consumption : 0.5 lb/equiv. hph (kg/equiv. kWh)@ Max Power, 300mph, 20000ft, ISA
- Thrust-to-weight ratio:
- Maximum flight rating: 2,350 hp (1,750 kW) equivalent at Max Power, 300mph, Sea Level, ISA
- Maximum flight rating: 1,500 hp (1,100 kW) equivalent at Max Power, 300mph, 20,000 ft (6,100 m), ISA NOTE:Equivalent Power defined as Propeller Shaft Power plus (Jet Thrust * Flight Velocity/Propeller Efficiency)
- Power-to-weight ratio: 1.02 equiv. hp/lb (1.677 equiv. kW/kg)

== See also ==
- List of aircraft engines
