= Handley Page Hermes =

Civilian airliner

HP.81 Hermes
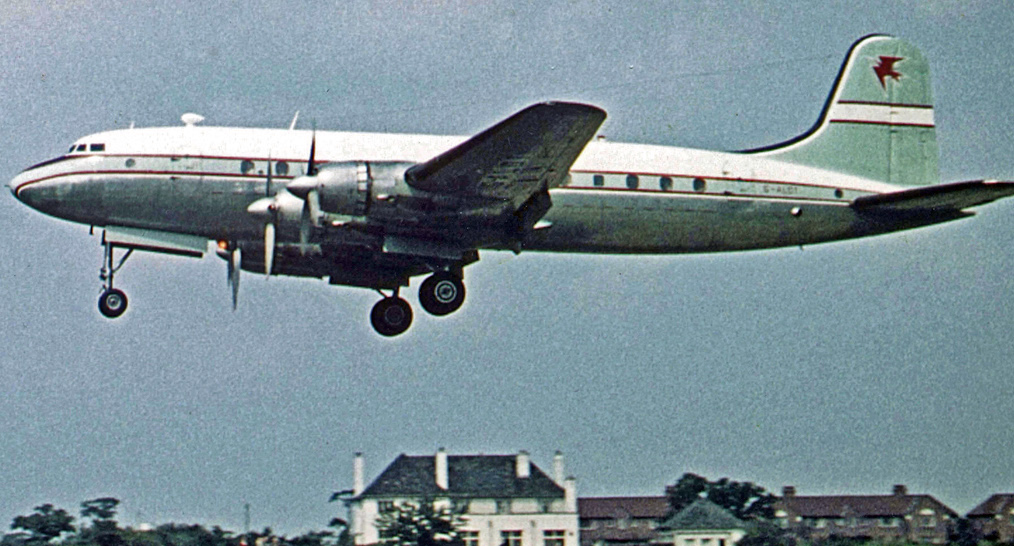
- Hermes IV of Air Safaris at Manchester Airport in 1961

General information
- Type: Airliner
- Manufacturer: Handley Page
- Primary user: BOAC
- Number built: 29

History
- Manufactured: 1945–1951
- Introduction date: 6 August 1950
- First flight: 2 December 1945
- Retired: 1965
- Developed from: Handley Page Hastings

The Handley Page HP.81 Hermes was a civilian airliner designed and produced by the British aircraft manufacturer Handley Page.

The Hermes was developed during the 1940s in parallel with the closely related Handley Page Hastings military transport. It was a low-wing monoplane, with most examples being powered by four piston engines. Originally intended to enter service in advance of the Hastings, development of the Hermes was delayed by the fatal loss of the first prototype during its maiden flight on 2 December 1945. Measures were taken to improve the airliner's stability as well as to expand its capacity, which sufficiently impressed the British Overseas Airways Corporation (BOAC) into placing a sizeable order for 25 HP 81 Hermes IV on 4 February 1947. A pair of turboprop-powered development aircraft were also ordered by the Ministry of Supply for experimental flights.

The Hermes entered airline service on 6 August 1950, having been delayed by roughly one year due to initial production aircraft being overweight. They would be operated by BOAC, the most prominent operator of the type, for less than a decade before they were sold onto other operators largely due to the rapid advances in airliners made during this era. During its later years of service, second hand Hermes were routinely used by various charter airlines. The final Hermes flight was performed sometime during 1969, by which point most of the type had already been scrapped as obsolete. A single example has been partially preserved.

== Design and development ==
=== Background ===
The Hermes can be traced back to discussions held by the Air Staff (United Kingdom) as early as summer 1943. At the time, authorities were considering not only the need for an immediate successor to the Royal Air Force's (RAF) fleet of Handley Page Halifax in the transport/freighter capacity, but also the role of an interim civil airliner for the post-war years. Accordingly, during December 1944, priority orders were placed for various projects, including both the military and civil programmes proposed by the British aircraft manufacturer Handley Page. For the civil airliner, Specification 15/43 was issued by the Air Ministry; this called for a pressurised civil transport that was capable of carrying up to 34 first class or 50 tourist class passengers.

During April 1944, at the urging of George Volkert, Handley Page's chief designer, to settle production priorities, the company's founder and managing director Frederick Handley Page decided to merge the work of several projects and prioritise the transport aircraft; this also aligned with the release of Specification C.3/44, which sought a multipurpose transport. Handley Page's proposal was accepted with no meaningful alterations sought. Shortly thereafter, it was recognised that development of the civil transport posed less of a challenge than the military transport project, thus it was decided that the airliner programme would be flown first. The military transport aircraft, which would share a relatively high level of similarities with the civil project, would enter service as the Handley Page Hastings, while the civil transport became known as the Hermes.

Despite the intentional similarities, there were distinct design differences between the two aircraft. Unlike the tailwheel of the Hastings, the Hermes was planned to have a nosewheel landing gear, although the first two prototypes were completed with a tailwheel undercarriage. Despite the differences, both aircraft remained similar enough that they were produced using the same primary assembly jigs. The first prototype was effectively an unpressurised "bare shell", while the second featured a pressurised cabin and was fully equipped in most respects. On 9 November 1945, a mock-up conference was held at the company's Cricklewood facility, attended by various airline officials and industry figures. Rapid progress on the first prototype's construction enabled it to commence ground trials at Radlett on 1 December 1945.

=== Into flight and redesign ===
While Handley Page had intended for the Hermes to be introduced in advance of the Hastings from an early stage of development, a delay to its production was necessitated after the first prototype (HP 68 Hermes 1), registered G-AGSS, crashed during its maiden flight shortly after takeoff on 2 December 1945. It is believed that the aircraft had encountered severe longitudinal instability due to elevator overbalance. Handley Page's chief test pilot and the chief test observer were both killed in the incident, while the prototype was completely destroyed by a post-impact fire.

In order to sufficiently resolve the instability that caused the fatal crash, development of the civil Hermes was protracted, while work on the Hastings progressed more smoothly. This delay presented the opportunity to undertake design revisions and improvements; it was decided that the second prototype's length would be extended to produce the HP 74 Hermes II. The prospects of powering the type with turboprop engines was also investigated around this time, but ultimately decided against. The first Hermes II (G-AGUB) performed its first flight on 2 September 1947; it quickly proved to not only have greater stability, but to also possess a superior lift coefficient to the Hastings as well. On 4 September 1948, the type received its certificate of airworthiness, clearing it for service.

On 4 February 1947, firm orders were placed by the British Overseas Airways Corporation (BOAC) for 25 of the definitive HP 81 Hermes IV. This model was furnished with a tricycle undercarriage and powered by four Bristol Hercules radial engines, each capable of generating up to 2,100 hp (1,570 kW). Additionally, a pair of Hermes V airliners were also ordered, the primary difference of this model was the use of four Bristol Theseus turboprop engines instead. Further turboprop-powered developments of the Hermes were also proposed to potential customers as a competitor to types such as the Bristol Britannia.

== Operational history ==
=== Airline operations ===
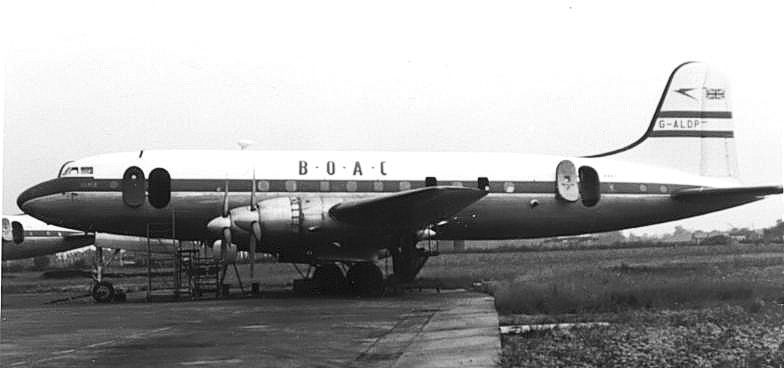
BOAC Hermes IV at London Heathrow in 1953

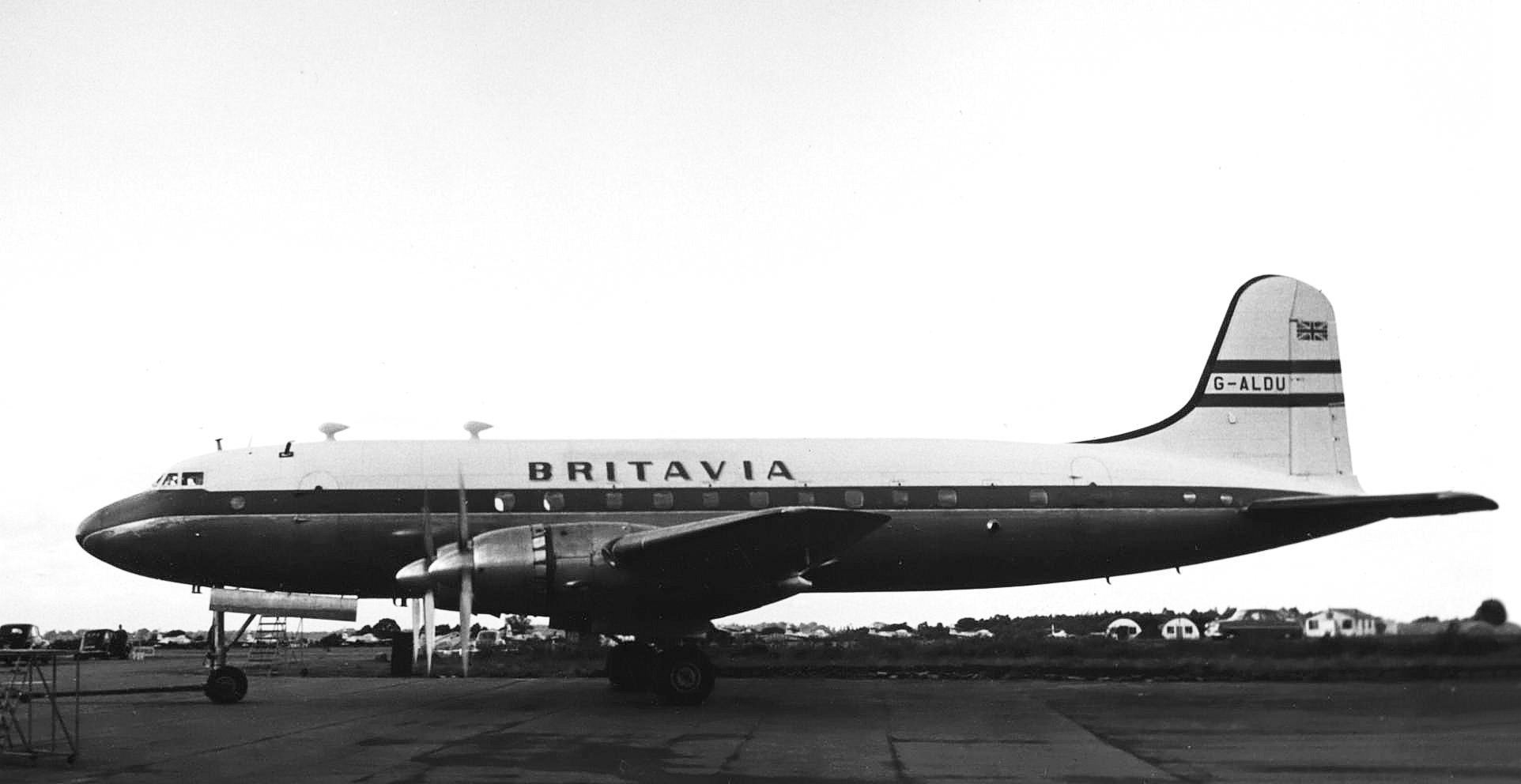
Hermes IV of Britavia at Blackbushe Airport in 1954

Despite the first Hermes IV (registered G-AKFP) performing its first flight relatively quickly on 5 September 1948, and quantity production being promptly established, BOAC was somewhat unsatisfied by the airliner, primarily due to the early aircraft being overweight. This was in part due to the use of Hastings components and ad-hoc modifications to accelerate flight trials; it was promptly agreed that weight-saving modifications were to be made prior to BOAC issuing its final acceptance of the Hermes. Design alterations to reduce weight included the adoption of lighter floor members.

On 6 August 1950, the Hermes IV finally entered service with BOAC, taking over from the Avro York on the West Africa service from London Heathrow to Accra via Tripoli, Kano and Lagos, with services to Kenya and South Africa commencing before the end of the year. The Hermes IV was used by BOAC on routes to West and South Africa. They were quickly replaced, however by the reliable Canadair Argonaut in 1952, although some re-entered service in July 1954 following the grounding of the de Havilland Comet, being retired again in December.

This was not the end of the Hermes in airline service, however, as surplus aircraft were sold to independent charter airlines, with Airwork purchasing four in 1952, others being operated by Britavia and Skyways, particularly in the trooping role. Many of these aircraft were fitted with Hercules 773 engines, which could be operated on lower octane fuel than the original Hercules 763s, being designated as Hermes IVA. They returned to Hermes IV standards when fuel supplies improved.

Later, the Hermes were flown on inclusive tour holiday flights from the UK. The last operational civil Hermes, G-ALDA, flown by Air Links Limited, was retired on 13 December 1964, and was scrapped nine days later.

=== Development aircraft ===
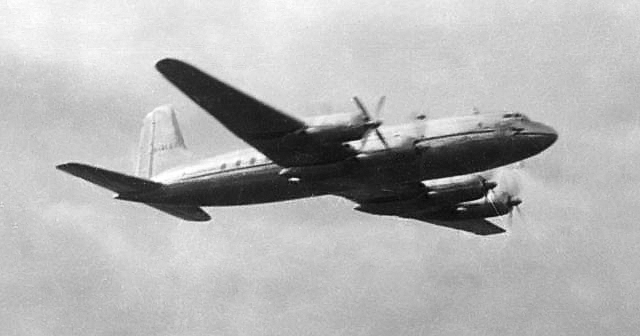
Hermes V G-ALEU at the Farnborough SBAC show in 1950. Note the slimmer nacelles of the Theseus turboprop engines

The two turboprop Hermes V were owned by the Ministry of Supply and made their first flights in August 1949. They were used for development of the Bristol Theseus turboprop engine. The first aircraft was lost in a wheels-up landing at Chilbolton airfield on 10 April 1951, but the second continued development flying with the Aeroplane and Armament Experimental Establishment (A&AEE) at MOD Boscombe Down and the Royal Aircraft Establishment (RAE) at Farnborough Airport until its retirement during September 1953.

The prototype Hermes II was given military markings in October 1953 as VX234 and was used for various research and development programmes, including the testing of airborne radar for the Royal Radar Establishment at RAF Defford, Worcestershire. It was finally retired in 1969, at which point the aircraft had been the final Hermes in operation.

== Preservation ==
The fuselage of a Hermes IV (the former BOAC aircraft G-ALDG named Horsa) is preserved at the Imperial War Museum Duxford.

== Variants ==
All 29 aircraft were built at Radlett Aerodrome, Hertfordshire, England.

HP.68 Hermes I
Prototype powered by four 1,650 hp (1,230 kW) Bristol Hercules 101 radial engines. One built.
HP.74 Hermes II
Prototype powered by four 1,675 hp (1,249 kW) Bristol Hercules 121 engines and a 13 ft (4.57 m) longer forward fuselage. One built.
HP.81 Hermes IV
Production aircraft with tricycle landing gear, powered by four 2,100 hp (1,570 kW) Bristol Hercules 763 engines. Twenty-five built.
HP.81 Hermes IVa
Hermes IV modified to use 100-octane fuel, with the engine redesignated Hercules 773. Most converted back to Hermes IV standard.
HP.82 Hermes V
Development aircraft with four 2,490 hp (1,860 kW) Bristol Theseus 502 turboprops. Two built.

== Operators ==
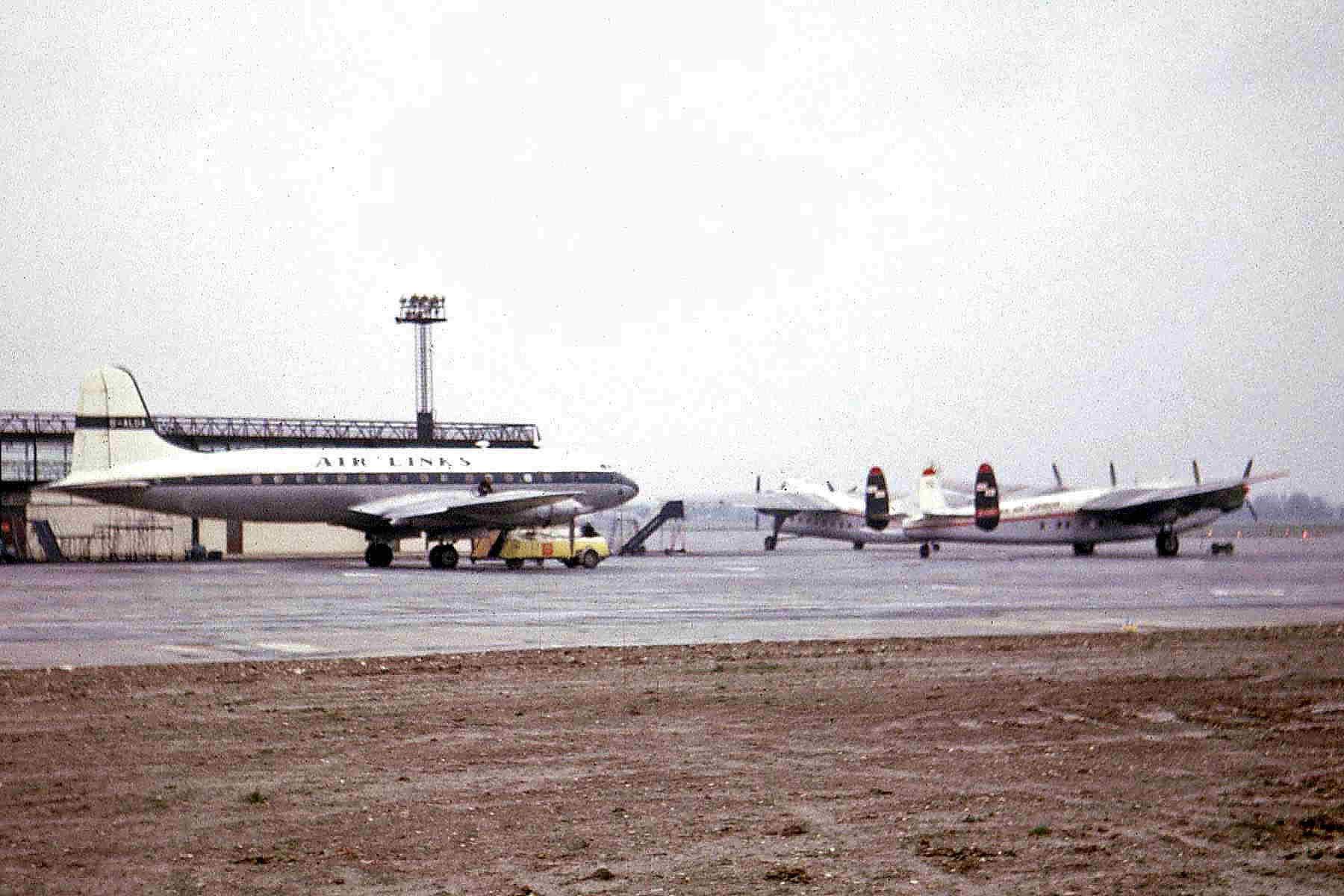
An Air Links Hermes at Gatwick Airport, circa 1962

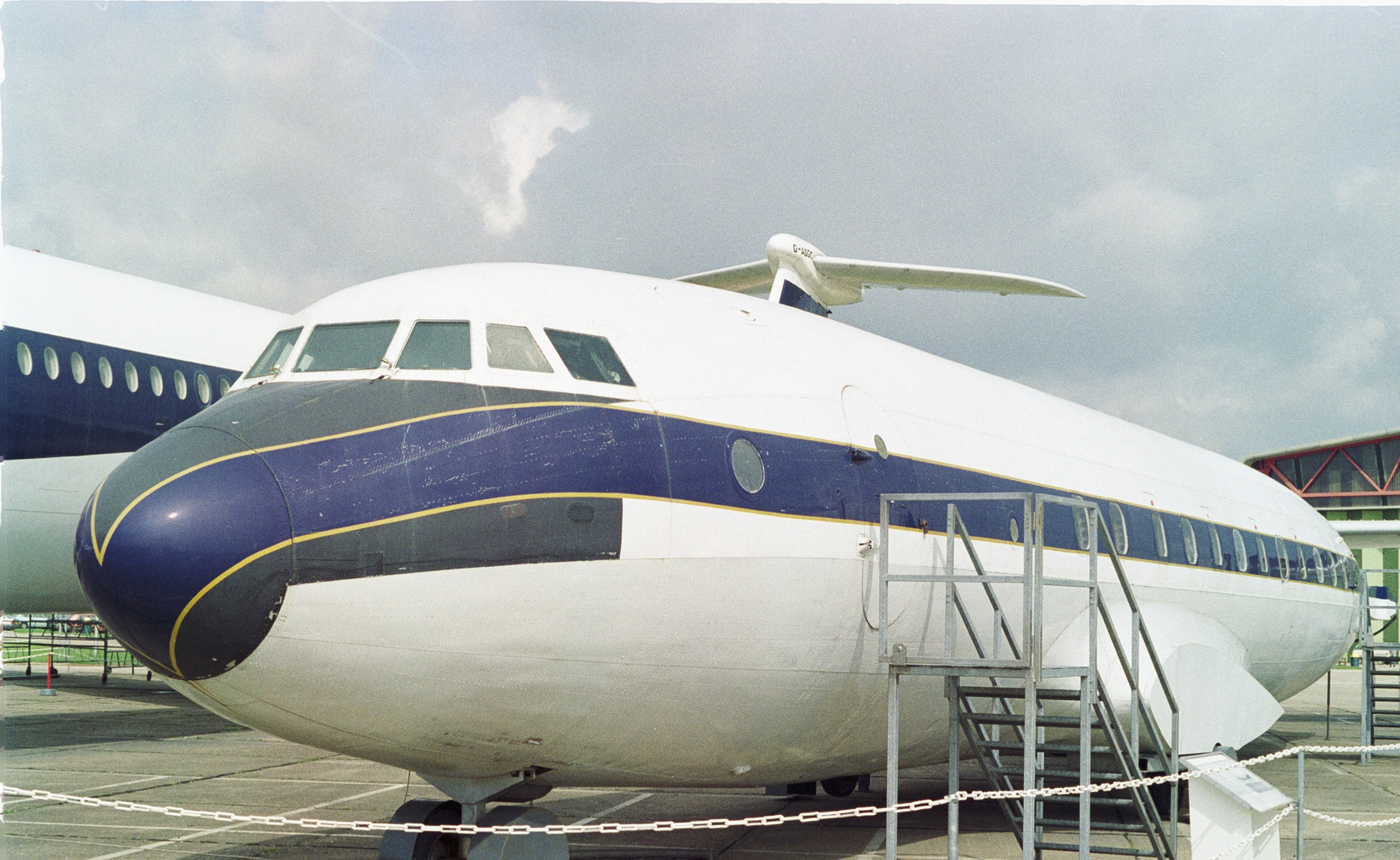
Preserved fuselage of G-ALDG, at the Imperial War Museum Duxford, 2010

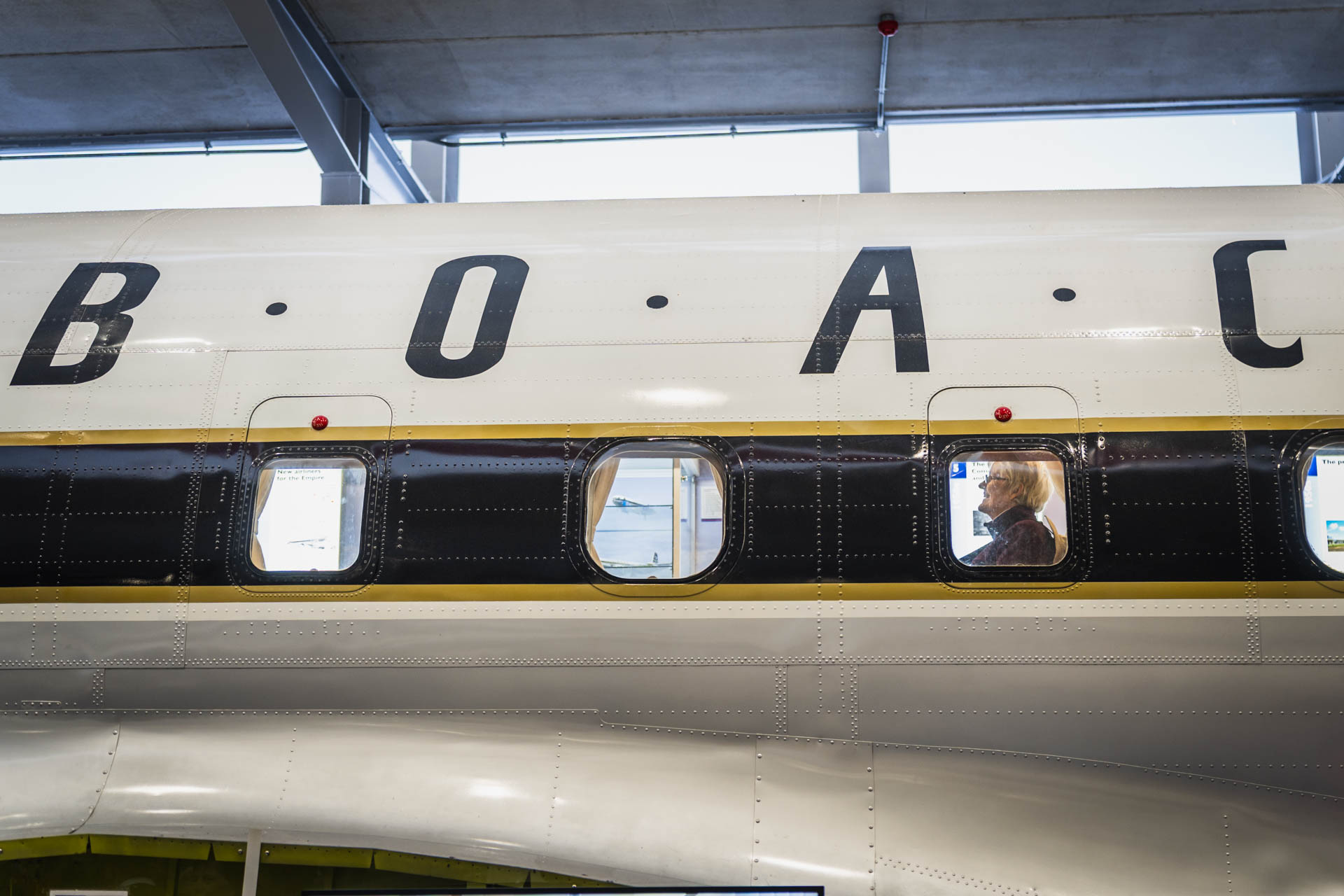
Preserved fuselage of G-ALDG, at the Imperial War Museum Duxford, 2025

Bahamas

- Bahamas Airways

Kuwait

- Kuwait Airways

Lebanon

- Middle East Airlines

United Kingdom

- Air Links
- Air Safaris
- Airwork
- Britavia
- British Overseas Airways Corporation
- Falcon Airways
- Royal Radar Establishment
- Silver City Airways
- Skyways
- Ministry of Supply

== Accidents and incidents ==
- 3 December 1945 - Hermes I G-AGSS the prototype Hermes crashed on the first test flight soon after takeoff three miles from Radlett Aerodrome. The two Handley Page test pilots were killed.
- 26 May 1952 - Hermes IV G-ALDN (Horus), operated by BOAC, en route from Tripoli, Libya, to Kano, Nigeria, flew off course for several hours and ran out of fuel, force landing in the Sahara Desert south of Atar, Mauritania. The passengers and crew all survived and spent several days in the desert before making their way to an oasis, where First Officer Ted Haslam, who had suffered a head injury in the crash, died.
- 25 August 1952 - Hermes IV 'G-ALDF' operated by Air-work Ltd en route from Blackbushe to Khartoum via Malta, ditched off Sicily (near Trapani) at 0300 LT, following failure of two engines and the prospect of the other two engines failing. Electrical power also failed, so no lights or radio available. The ditching was "brilliantly performed" and successful, but 6 passengers (including 4 young children) and one air hostess drowned, mainly due to defective life jackets and lack of a life raft for the children. Investigation report by the Italian authorities (not published in UK) is summarised in ICAO Circular 38-AN/33. Contains some criticism of the crew and operating company and recommended improvements to the aircraft and to safety provisions. Matter raised in Parliament by Wedgwood Benn MP.
- 4 March 1956 - Hermes IV G-ALDW operated by Skyways Limited was destroyed on the ground by a time-bomb in the forward freight compartment. The aircraft was at Nicosia Airport, Cyprus when the explosion occurred 20 minutes before the aircraft was due to depart for the United Kingdom with 68 passengers. There were no fatalities.
- 5 August 1956 - Hermes IV G-ALDK operated by Britavia suffered the collapse of the nose undercarriage at Drigh Road Airport, Karachi, Pakistan. The aircraft was damaged beyond economic repair.
- 5 November 1956 - Hermes IVa G-ALDJ operated by Britavia crashed on night approach to Blackbushe Aerodrome, England in bad weather. Seven of the 80 occupants died.
- 1 April 1958 - Hermes IV G-ALDV operated by Skyways Limited. Crashed at Meesden Green, close to Stansted Airport, whilst on an airtest after an engine change. The crew of three, Capt. Rayment, Capt. West and FE. N Bradley were all killed.
- 9 October 1960 - Hermes IV G-ALDC of Falcon Airways overran the runway on landing at Southend Airport, ending up across the Shenfield to Southend railway line. The aircraft was written off but all 76 people on board survived.

== Specifications (Hermes IV) ==
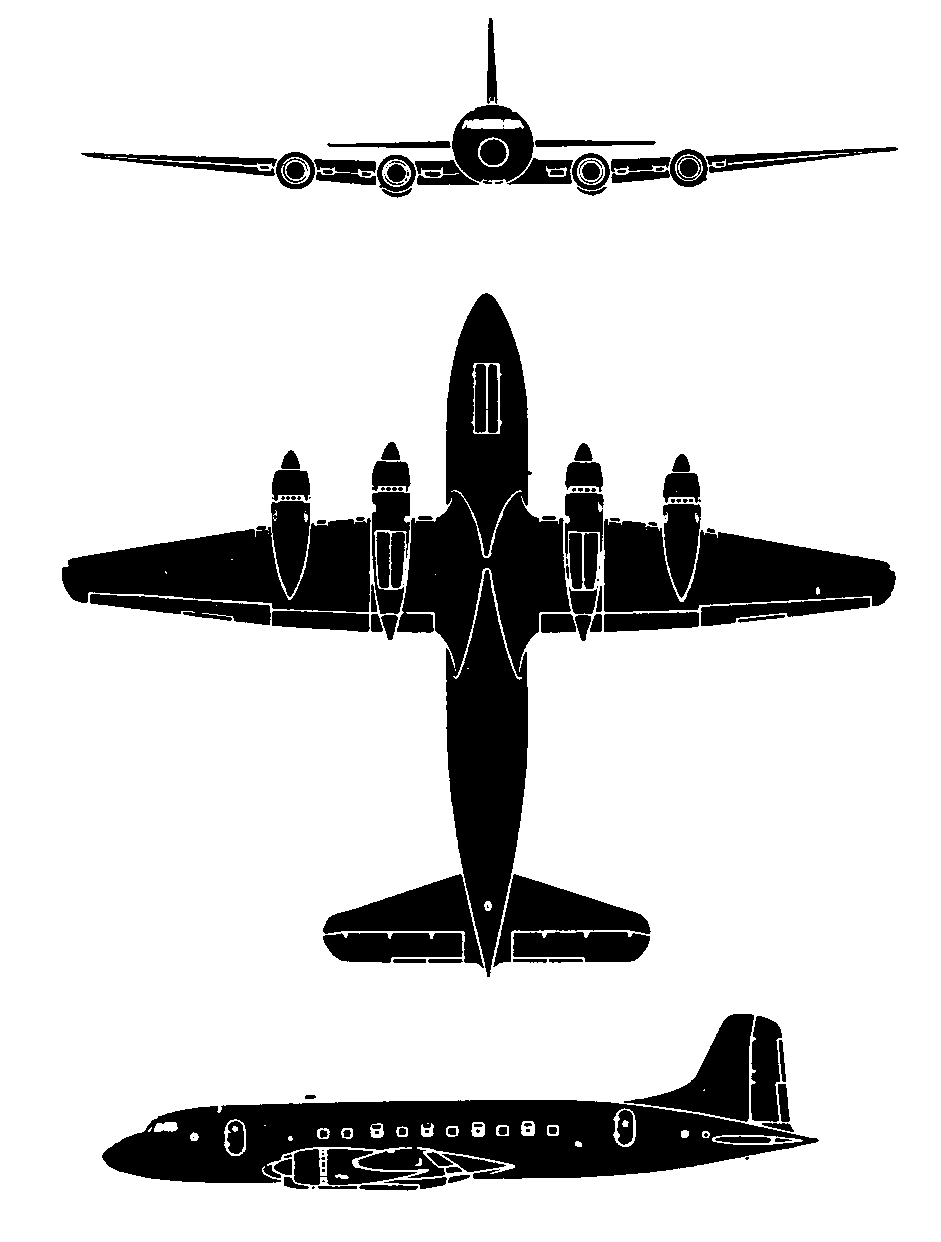
Hermes IV

Data from Jane's All the World's Aircraft 1950-51

General characteristics

- Crew: Five flight crew, plus cabin crew
- Capacity: 40 - 82 passengers
- Length: 96 ft 10 in (29.51 m)
- Wingspan: 113 ft (34 m)
- Height: 29 ft 11 in (9.12 m)
- Wing area: 1,408 sq ft (130.8 m^{2})
- Airfoil: root: NACA 23021; tip: NACA 23007
- Empty weight: 55,350 lb (25,106 kg) basic equipped
- Max takeoff weight: 82,000 lb (37,195 kg)
- Maximum landing weight: 75,000 lb (34,019 kg)
- Fuel capacity: 3,224 imp gal (3,872 US gal; 14,657 L) in integral wing tanks; 4x 37 imp gal (44 US gal; 168 L) oil tanks
- Powerplant: 4 × Bristol Hercules 14-cylinder air-cooled radial piston engines, 2,020 hp (1,510 kW) each for take-off
- Propellers: 4-bladed de Havilland Hydromatic, 13 ft (4.0 m) diameter constant-speed fully-feathering reversible-pitch propellers

Performance

- Maximum speed: 357 mph (575 km/h, 310 kn) at 20,000 ft (6,100 m)
- Cruise speed: 266 mph (428 km/h, 231 kn) maximum weak mixture at 10,000 ft (3,000 m)

274 mph (238 kn; 441 km/h) maximum weak mixture at 20,000 ft (6,100 m)
213 mph (185 kn; 343 km/h) maximum range speed at 10,000 ft (3,000 m)
244 mph (212 kn; 393 km/h) maximum range speed at 20,000 ft (6,100 m)

- Range: 3,147–3,554 mi (5,065–5,720 km, 2,735–3,088 nmi) with 2,213 lb (1,004 kg) payload at 20,000 ft (6,100 m) dependent on speed
- Service ceiling: 24,500 ft (7,500 m)
- Rate of climb: 1,030 ft/min (5.2 m/s)
- Time to altitude:

- 10,000 ft (3,000 m) in 10 minutes 30 seconds
- 20,000 ft (6,100 m) in 25 minutes

- Wing loading: 58.2 lb/sq ft (284 kg/m^{2})
- Power/mass: 0.104 hp/lb (0.171 kW/kg)
- Take-off run: 3,330 ft (1,015 m) at 82,000 lb (37,195 kg)
- Take-off distance to 50 ft (15 m): 4,440 ft (1,350 m)
- Landing distance from 50 ft (15 m): 4,224 ft (1,287 m)

== See also ==
Related development

- Handley Page Hastings

Aircraft of comparable role, configuration, and era

- Avro Tudor
- Douglas DC-6
