= Air Safaris =

Airline of the United Kingdom

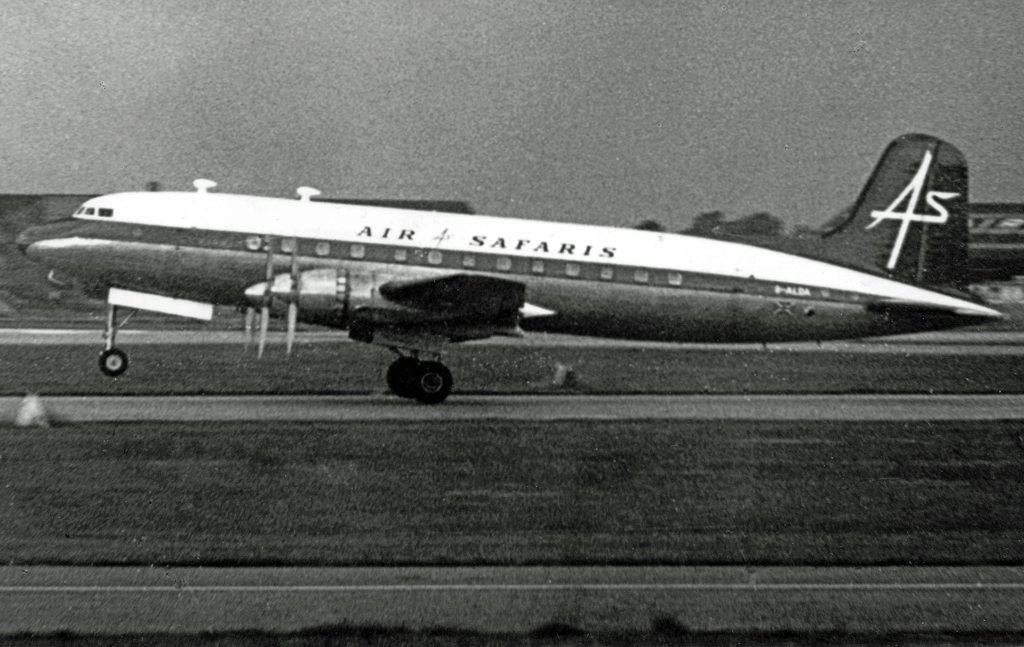
- HP.81 Handley Page Hermes
- Founded: 1959
- Ceased operations: 1962
- Hubs: London Gatwick Airport
- Headquarters: Old Terminal Building, Gatwick Airport South
- Key people: Alan Stocks (General Manager)

Air Safaris was a British scheduled and charter airline from 1959 to 1962.

== History ==
=== Meredith Air Transport ===
Meredith Air Transport Ltd. was founded by captain pilot W.E. Hamilton on August 12, 1952. After overhauling a Douglas DC-3 he had already purchased, flying operations began in October. Various types of on-demand cargo flights were performed. At the end of December, a Mediterranean tour was begun, activities which continued until May of the following year. The DC-3 was sold in June to Davies and Newman (redy to start Dan-Air). The airline continued in existence with no aircraft but Hamilton took over as European Director of the South African airline Trek Airways.

=== African Air Safaris ===
Meredith changed name to African Air Safaris on 29 November 1954. In October 1956 two four-engined HP.81 Handley Page Hermes were bought but not directly operated. Two twin-engined Vickers Vikings were transferred from Trek fleet in 1958 and started flying from Southend to Johannesburg. In 1959 the airline began IT flights from London Gatwick Airport to Scandinavia (Bergen), Continental Europe (Basle, Geneva, Lyon, Munich, Rotterdam, Zagreb) and Mediterranean destinations (Lourdes-Tarbes, Nice, Palma de Mallorca, Perpignan, Rimini, Toulouse). The activities were productive and so the time came for another change, detaching from Africa.

=== Air Safaris ===
On 26 November 1959, with a move to Gatwick Airport, the airline changed name to Air Safaris Ltd. It was equipped with Handley Page Hermes and Vickers Viking. Flights to South Africa were completely discontinued in 1960. That same year, the fleet maintenance base was established at Hurn Airport (Bournemouth), and some charter flights were also operated from there. In November, Don Everall Aviation's transport division (along with the network of scheduled domestic flights from Birmingham Airport and charter flights) was acquired. In April 1961, Air Safaris inaugurated its first route, from Bournemouth to Ostend and onward to Amsterdam. Routes from Bournemouth to Dublin and Belfast followed. Meanwhile, IT flights on behalf of Horizon Travel, Airway Holidays, and Universal Sky Tours to the Mediterranean had also begun from Birmingham, Glasgow, Manchester, and Newcastle. The first financial problems arose because banks were reluctant to grant loans to so-called "secondary" airlines. All scheduled flights were thus suspended on October 27. Few charter flights were completed by the 31st. The 200 staff were given formal notice that the company would close due to "money difficulties". An official from the company announced that they were trying to save the company but the following week a receiver was appointed. At a meeting of creditors on 29 January 1962 the company had a total deficiency of £521,073, over a quarter of which was for unpaid fuel. The failure of the company was attributed by the directors to insufficient capital and too rapid expansion, loss of income from aircraft under repair, high wage costs and large hire-purchase payments were also cited. As the company's assets would just about cover the debts the company was handed over to the official receiver to liquidate. The airline AOC was revoked on 11 February 1962.

== Fleet ==
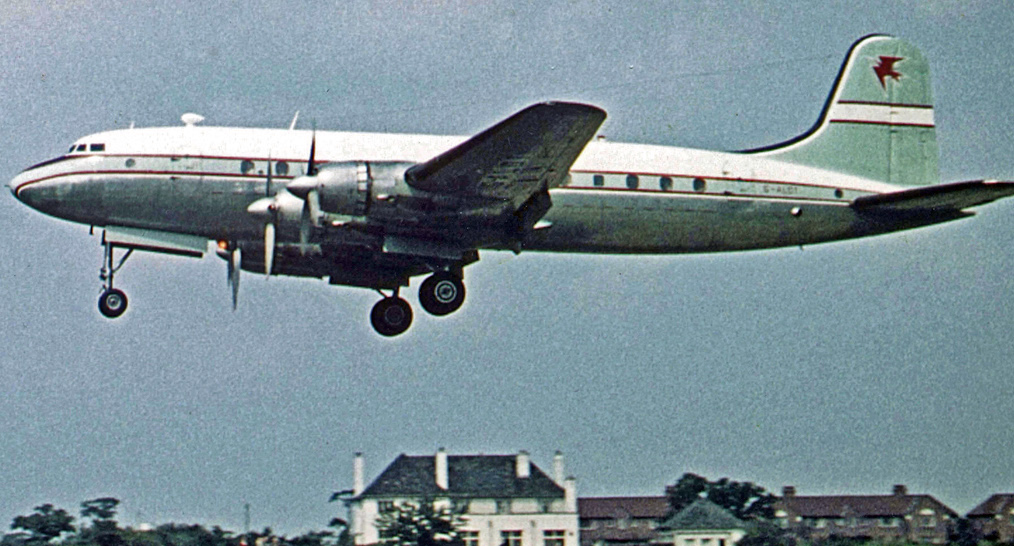
Air Safaris Hermes at Manchester (Ringway) Airport in 1961

- 1 x Douglas Dakota (with Meredith Air Transport)
- 6 x Handley Page Hermes
- 14 x Vickers VC.1 Viking

== See also ==
- List of defunct airlines of the United Kingdom
