= Fokker T.V =

Dutch twin-engine bomber (1937–1940)

Fokker T.V / T5
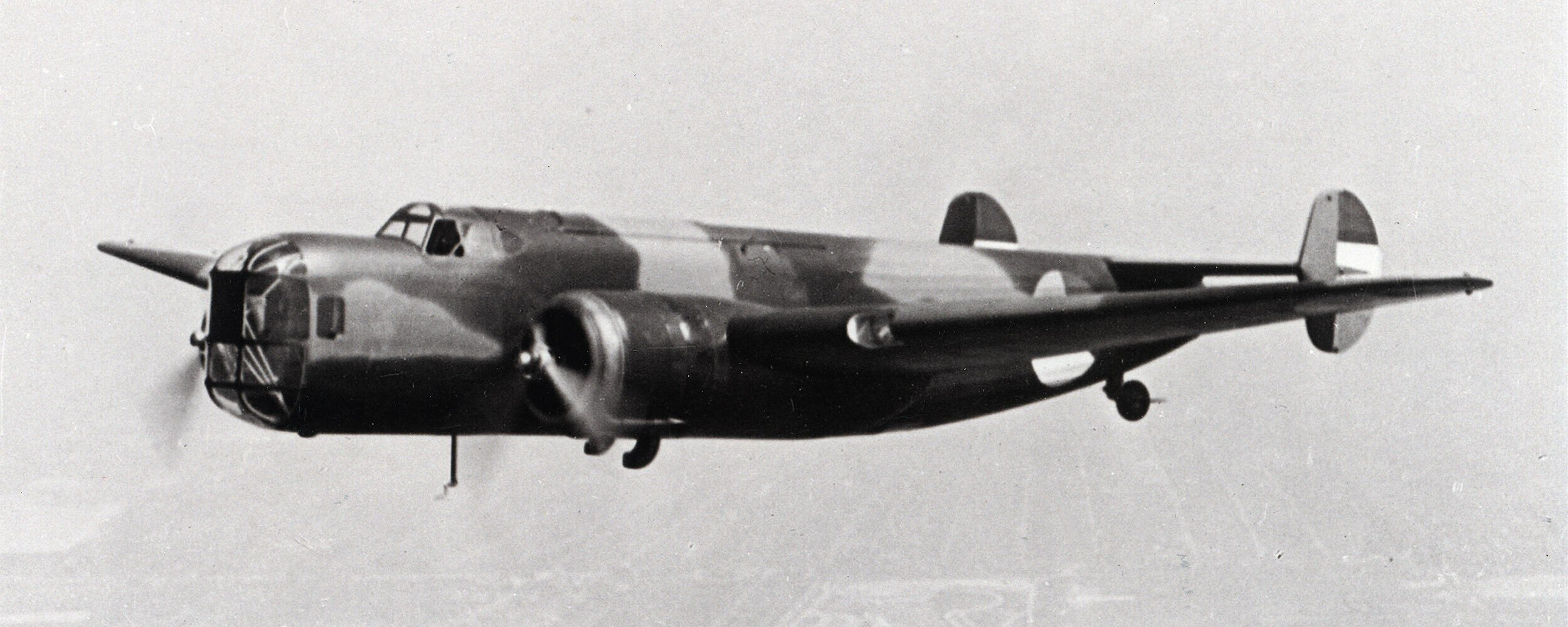
- Unarmed Fokker T5 in early livery.

General information
- Type: Medium bomber Heavy bomber hunter
- Manufacturer: Fokker
- Primary user: Dutch Army Aviation Brigade
- Number built: 16

History
- Introduction date: 1938
- First flight: 16 October 1937
- Retired: 1940

The Fokker T.V, in service written as T5, was a twin-engine medium bomber and heavy bomber hunter, described as an "aerial cruiser", built by Fokker for the Netherlands Air Force. It could carry over 1,000 kg (2,200 lb) of bombs, and was armed with a movable 20 mm Solothurn S18-350 aircraft cannon in the nose.

Modern for its time, by the German invasion of 1940 it was outclassed by the airplanes of the Luftwaffe, although it was used with some success.

== Development and design ==
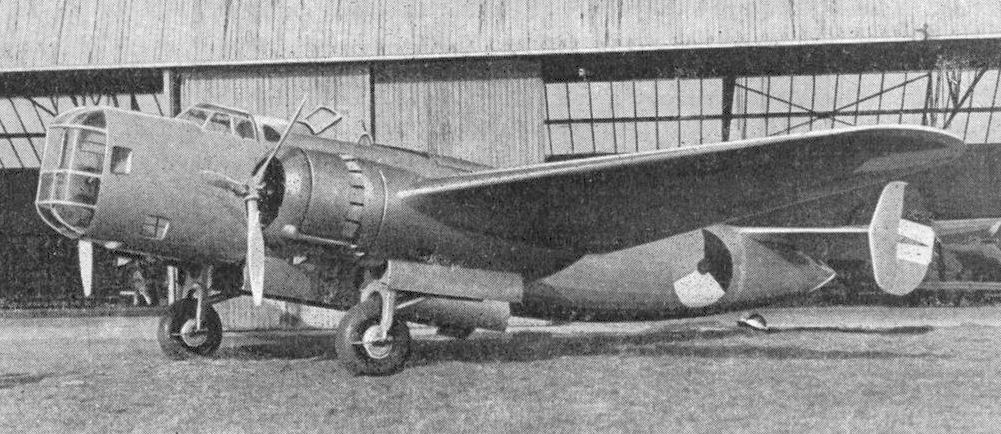
Fokker T.V in October 1937

In the early 1930s, the Luchtvaartafdeling (i.e. the Netherlands Army Air Force) became interested in the luchtkruiser (aerial cruiser) concept multipurpose aircraft, which was to have a primary role of intercepting and destroying enemy bomber formations, with a secondary role as a long-range bomber, with Colonel P.W. Best, commander of the Luchtvaartafdeling stating on 28 March 1935 that aircraft of the luchtkruiser should be purchased in as large numbers as possible, proposing to cancel procurement of the Fokker D.XXI fighter to release funds.

To meet this requirement, Fokker developed the T.V, a five-seat, twin-engined monoplane. It featured a wooden wing, while the slab-sided fuselage was of mixed construction, with a wooden monocoque centre fuselage, a fabric covered steel tube rear fuselage and a duralumin forward fuselage. While this construction method was typical for Fokker aircraft, it was obsolete compared with contemporary aircraft of its size, which were normally of all-metal construction. It was fitted with a 20 mm autocannon in the nose to meet the bomber destroyer part of the requirement, and four defensive Browning machine guns, one each in dorsal, ventral and tail positions, with one capable of being switched between two waist positions. It had a bomb-bay under the centre fuselage capable of carrying up to 1,000 kg (2,200 lb) of bombs.

A contract was signed for 16 T.Vs on 7 December 1936, with the first aircraft (not a prototype as such) flying on 16 October 1937 from Schiphol airfield.

== Operational history ==
The first 11 T.Vs, by now considered medium bombers, were delivered in 1938, with the last 4 following in 1939. Although it had good handling characteristics, it suffered from reliability problems with its engines and propellers, and by the summer of 1939, the Netherlands was planning to purchase 24 Dornier Do 215s to replace them.

On 10 May 1940, Germany invaded the Netherlands, Belgium and Luxembourg. The T.V soon saw its first combat: when taking off from Schiphol to avoid air attack, eight T.Vs encountered a formation of German bombers, shooting down two. After this, the T.V reverted to its primary bomber role, being used in attacks against German airborne troops landing at The Hague and Rotterdam. By the end of the first day of fighting only two T.Vs were serviceable. These were sent against bridges over the Meuse at Rotterdam on 11 May and a further aircraft was shot down; the final T.V was shot down on 13 May during attacks on bridges at Moerdijk.

As the T.V lacked self-sealing fuel tanks, they gained a reputation for rapidly catching fire when hit by enemy fire.

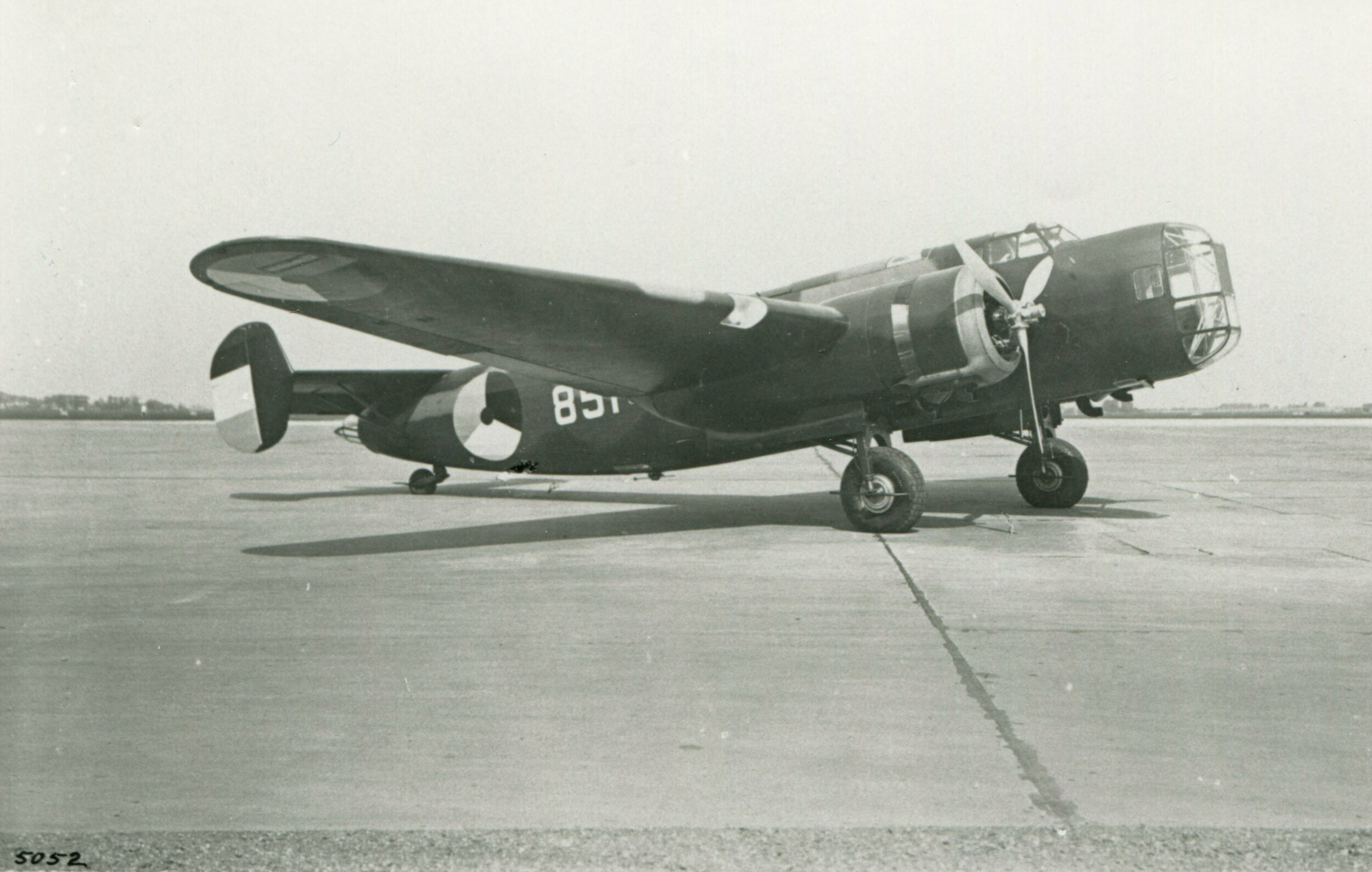
Delivered Fokker T5, unarmed

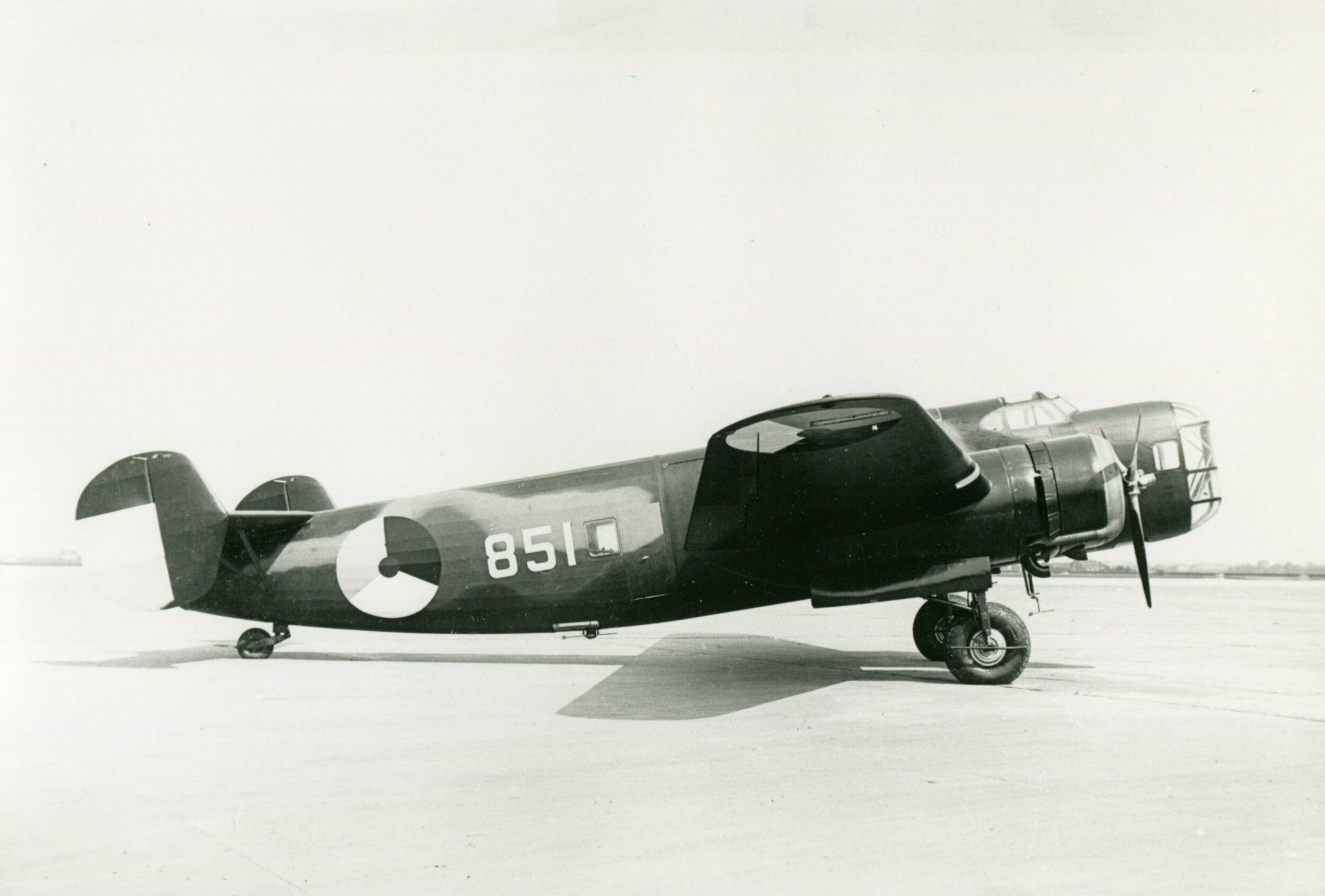
Fokker T5 in profile, unarmed

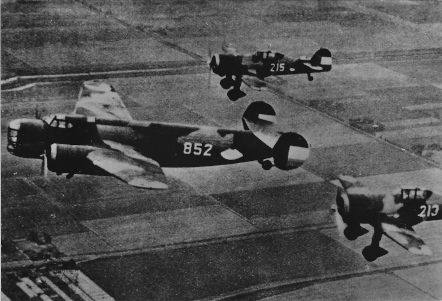
Fokker T5 escorted by two Fokker D21

== Operators ==
Netherlands

- Royal Netherlands Air Force

== Specifications ==
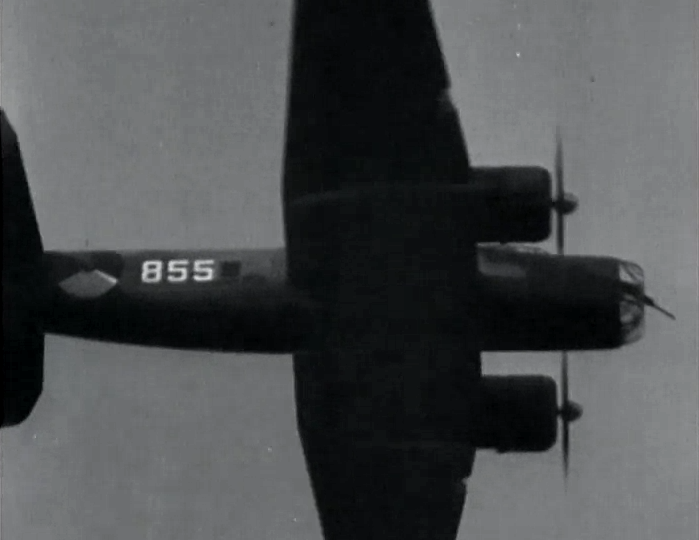
Fokker T5 armed with its intended nose-mounted movable 20 mm cannon, 1939

Data from Frustrated Fokker

General characteristics

- Crew: 5 (Pilot, co-pilot, bombardier, radioman/gunner, gunner)
- Length: 16 m (52 ft 6 in)
- Wingspan: 21 m (68 ft 11 in)
- Height: 4.2 m (13 ft 9 in) tail down
- Wing area: 66.2 m^{2} (713 sq ft)
- Airfoil: root: NACA 23017; tip: NACA 23009
- Empty weight: 4,650 kg (10,251 lb)
- Gross weight: 7,250 kg (15,984 lb)
- Max takeoff weight: 7,650 kg (16,865 lb)
- Powerplant: 2 × Bristol Pegasus XXVI 9-cylinder air-cooled radial piston engines, 690 kW (930 hp) each
- Propellers: 3-bladed variable-pitch propellers

Performance

- Maximum speed: 417 km/h (259 mph, 225 kn)
- Cruise speed: 335 km/h (208 mph, 181 kn)
- Range: 1,550 km (960 mi, 840 nmi)
- Service ceiling: 8,550 m (28,050 ft)
- Time to altitude: 5,000 m (16,000 ft) in 13 minutes 6 seconds

Armament

- Guns:
  - 1 × 20 mm (0.79 in) Vliegtuigmitrailleur M.37 (Solothurn S18-350) cannon for the nose gunner
  - 5 × 8 mm (0.31 in) Mitrailleur M.20 Vliegtuig (Lewis gun without jacket in 7.92×57mmR) in dorsal, ventral, and lateral positions, as well as in the tail cupola
- Bombs: 1200 kg (2,645 lb) of bombs

== See also ==
Related development

- Fokker T.IX

Aircraft of comparable role, configuration, and era

- Bristol Blenheim
- Bell YFM-1 Airacuda
- Kawasaki Ki-48 Sokei
- Martin Maryland
- PZL.37 Łoś
- Ilyushin DB-3

Related lists

- List of aircraft of World War II
- List of bomber aircraft
