= British Aviation Services =

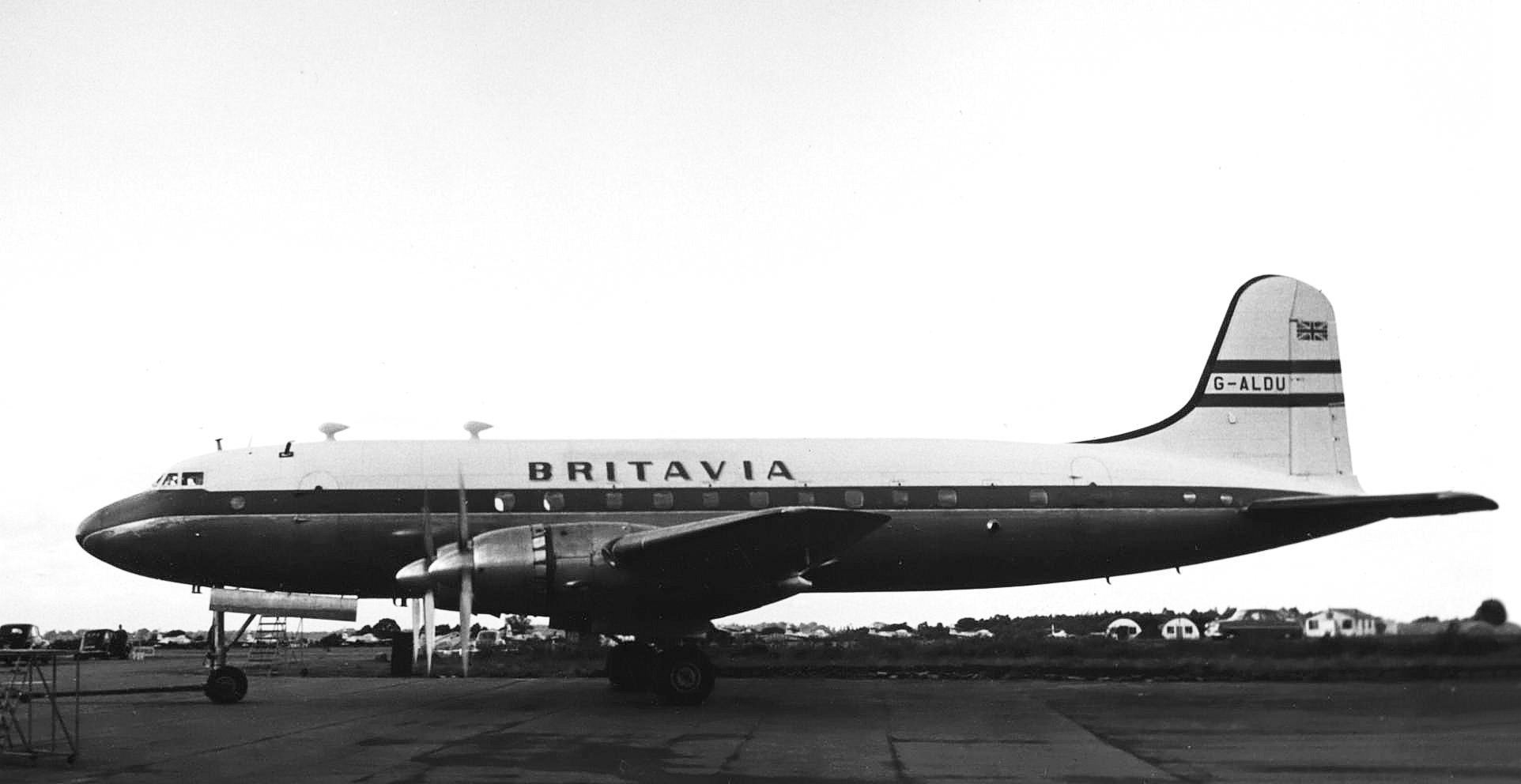
- HP.81 Handley Page Hermes IV
- Founded: 1945 (as a consultancy)
- Commenced operations: 1946 (ferry flights) - 1947 (charters) - 1949 (as Britavia)
- Ceased operations: 1962 (halted operations and became a holding company)
- Hubs: Blackbushe Airport
- Subsidiaries: Air Kruise, Aquila Airways, Silver City Airways
- Fleet size: 43 aircraft (5 Handley Page Hermes, 14 Bristol Superfreighter, 7 Bristol Freighter, 7 Douglas DC-3, 1 Douglas DC-2, 3 Short Solent, 2 de Havilland Heron, 3 de Havilland Dragon Rapide, 1 Airspeed Consul (as of April 1958))
- Destinations: worldwide
- Headquarters: Central London
- Key people: Air Cdre Griffith J. Powell, Eoin C. Mekie, A. V-M. S.D. MacDonald, W.G. Franklin, M.D. Day

British Aviation Services Ltd. was an early post-World War II airline holding company and air transport operator that could trace its roots back to 1946. Its main activities included trooping, inclusive tour (IT) and worldwide passenger and freight charter services. British Aviation Services' first investment in a British independent (Note: independent from government-owned corporations) airline occurred in 1946, when it acquired a minority interest in Silver City Airways. Silver City Airways operated the world's first cross-Channel air ferry service on 13 July 1948. It subsequently became British Aviation Services' biggest operating division. In 1953, British Aviation Services took over the independent airline Air Kruise. The same year, BAS Group also took control of Aquila Airways, the last commercial flying boat operator in the United Kingdom. The completion of these acquisitions by mid-1954 resulted in a reorganisation of the British Aviation Services group, with British Aviation Services Ltd (BAS Group) becoming the group's holding company and Britavia the main operating subsidiary. By the late 1950s, BAS Group became Britain's largest independent airline operator. Its numerous operating divisions included Britavia's Hermes Division at Blackbushe Airport and Aquila Airways's Flying Boat Division at Hamble near Southampton. The former concentrated on trooping services and inclusive tours while the latter provided scheduled services to Portugal, the Canary Islands and Italy. In early 1962, BAS Group merged into Air Holdings and gave life to British United Airways (BUA), which immediately replaced Britavia as the UK's largest independent airline operator.

== History ==
In 1945, the Second World War recently ended, Capt A.G. Lamplugh, head of the British Aviation Insurance Group, and Air Cdre Griffith J. ("Taffy") Powell, its chief technical officer, persuaded that company's shareholders to establish British Aviation Services as a new consulting company able to ferry US-built airliners to their European customers. Following British Aviation Services Ltd.' incorporation in November of that same year, Powell got in touch with W.S. Robinson, chairman of London based mining company Zinc Corporation. That meeting resulted in Robinson appointing Powell as the Zinc Corporation's adviser.

One of Powell's first visits in his new capacity as adviser to the Zinc Corporation took him to Broken Hill, Australia, also known as Silver City. This visit resulted in the decision to set up a new air transport operator to serve the mining industry, to be named Silver City Airways. Silver City Airways was incorporated on 25 November 1946. British Aviation Services became one of the new airline's shareholders, initially taking a 10% stake. It took full control of Silver City Airways in 1949, as a result of buying out the other shareholders. The decision to become Silver City's sole shareholder coincided with British Aviation Services' strategic move to become an airline operator in its own right under Britavia name to operate trooping flights.

In July 1946 BAS USA-Europe ferry flights started while in the following year charter operations were launched. Eoin Mekie, a Glaswegian lawyer, became the new chairman of the reorganised British Aviation Services (BAS) Group in 1950 as the company transformed itself in a holding concern. Flight operations had been transferred to Britavia in late 1949.

In 1946 British Aviation Services (Malta) Ltd was formed in Malta, with local shareholders including Cassar & Cooper Ltd, operating charters with Chartair aircraft based there, as well as BAS aircraft staging through. The company merged with The Instone 1946 Ltd and with Chartair shareholding, to form Air Malta Ltd in 1947.

In early 1953, BAS Group announced its intention to take over Aquila Airways, Britain's last remaining flying boat operator. According to BAS's official statement regarding the proposed Aquila takeover, this transaction envisaged the acquisition of Aquila's entire share capital "partly on a cash and partly on a share exchange basis". It furthermore entailed the relocation of Aquila's administrative and reservation offices to BAS's central London premises and the continuation of all flying boat operations as a separate entity under Aquila managing director Barry Aikman. BAS's official statement moreover foresaw an expansion of flying boat activities and an increase in the associated fleet and facilities as well as additional services to and from Portugal, including Madeira. The take-over was consummated in the month of March.

The same year, BAS acquired Lympne-based Air Kruise, an independent airline operating charter and pleasure flights using passenger-configured de Havilland Dragon Rapides and Douglas Dakotas. Air Kruise's regular charter flights across the English Channel between Lympne and Le Touquet formed the basis of what would become Silver City's passenger Southern division.

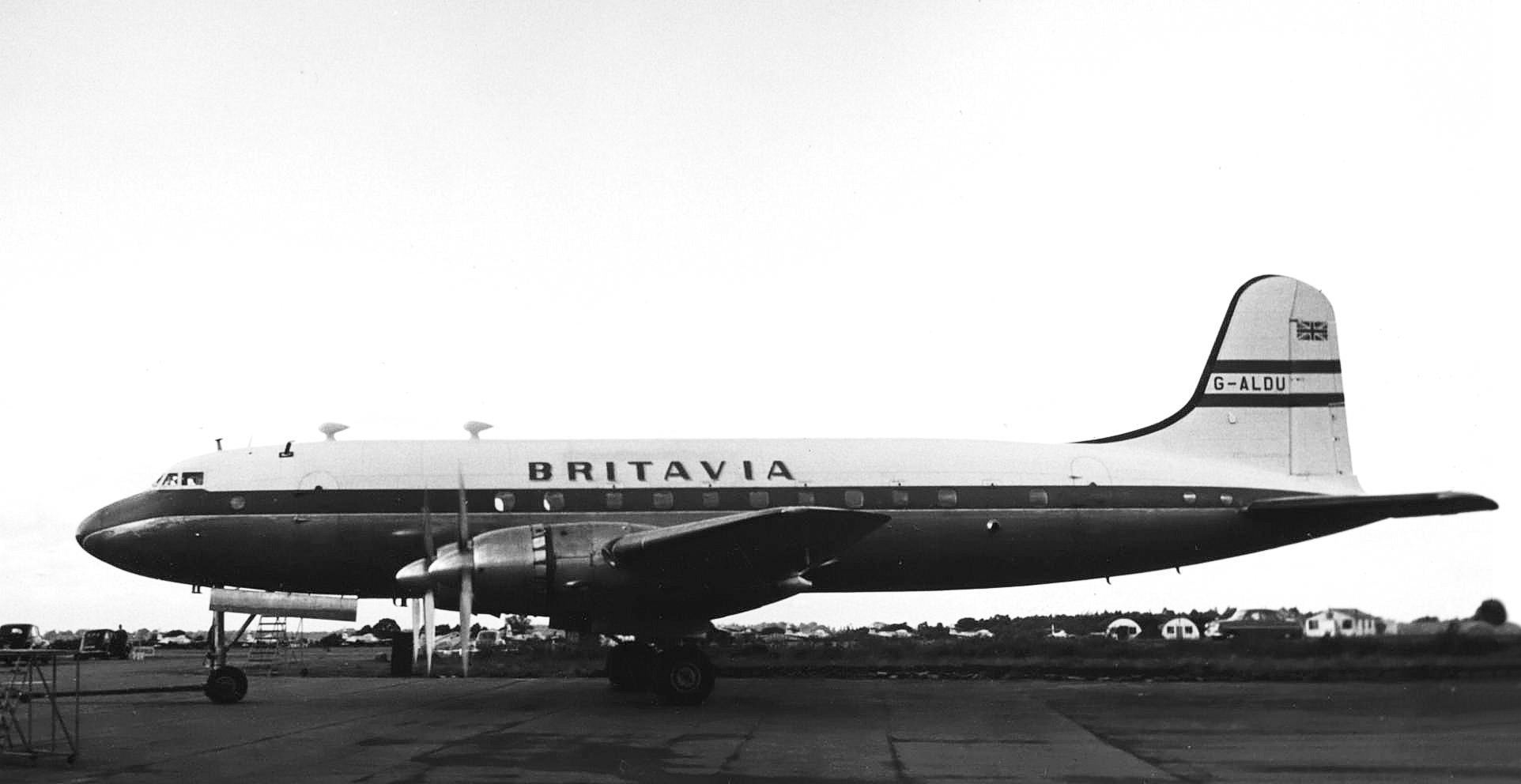
Britavia Handley Page Hermes IV at Blackbushe Airport in 1954

In 1954, P&O subsidiary General Steam Navigation became BAS Group's controlling shareholder with a 70% stake. Eagle Star Insurance and Cable & Wireless were minority shareholders that respectively owned 20% and 10% of BAS's share capital. The completion of the Air Kruise and Aquila Airways acquisitions by 1 May 1954 resulted in another enlargement of BAS Group. At this point, BAS assumed the role of the enlarged group's parent company, while Britavia Ltd. (legally established in 1949) became one of its subsidiaries. This was also the year Britavia purchased four Hermes from British Overseas Airways Corporation (BOAC). These aircraft were allocated to Britavia's Hermes Division at Blackbushe and formed the core fleet for the airline's trooping flights and IT services.

In May 1955, BAS took over Isle of Man-based Manx Airlines (first airline with such corporate name), an independent airline operating charter flights and regional scheduled services. On 14 November of this same year, a Britavia Handley Page Hermes 4 (G-ALDU) operated the type's first flight across the North Atlantic. The aircraft had been chartered to carry 39 members of a ship's relief crew from Blackbushe to New York and to return the replaced crew to the UK. The outbound flight routed via Shannon and Gander. Flying time was 17 hours and 15 minutes. The return leg included a stop in Gander and took 16 hours 9 minutes. In the following December, BAS agreed to buy out David Brown and Eric Rylands, the owners of Blackpool-based Lancashire Aircraft Corporation (LAC). BAS's acquisition of LAC did not include the assets of Skyways Ltd, at the time the latter's biggest operating subsidiary.

In 1957, BAS gained control of Newcastle upon Tyne-based Dragon Airways, another independent regional operator. This acquisition concluded BAS's expansion. It was followed by formation of Silver City Airways's new Northern passenger division (combining Dragon Airways + Lancashire Aircraft + Manx Airlines operations), beginning with repainting the recently acquired airlines' aircraft into Silver City's silver, royal blue and white livery. This was also the year Britavia and fellow Hermes operators Airwork and Skyways lost the bulk of their trooping business to Hunting-Clan, another contemporary independent rival, as a consequence of the Government's growing dissatisfaction with the operational performance and high costs of the aging Hermes fleet that was contracted from Britavia and its independent rivals to operate most of these flights. Apart from Britavia itself, BAS Group's operating subsidiaries encompassed Silver City Airways, Air Kruise, Aquila Airways, LAC and Manx Airlines.

By early 1957, the Air Kruise cross-Channel services, as well as all Dragon Airways, LAC and Manx Airlines operations from Newcastle upon Tyne, Blackpool and the Isle of Man respectively had been transferred to Silver City's Northern Division to streamline BAS Group's fragmented airline operations. It was hoped that these measures would improve the group's financial performance.

Although BAS Group had become the UK's biggest independent airline operator by that time, it began making heavy losses. The loss of Britavia's biggest trooping contract to Hunting-Clan was the main reason for BAS's poor financial performance. The urgent need to replace the aging flying boat fleet made this situation worse. As a result of the rapidly deteriorating financial performance of the group's flying boat activities and the lack of suitable replacements for the obsolete fleet, all flying boat activities ceased by September 1958. Both trooping and flying boat activities had accounted for a major share of the group's business.

In 1959, Britavia transferred its entire five-strong Hermes 4A fleet to sister airline Silver City, as a consequence of the loss of another trooping contract to Eagle and the air carrier became a holding concern for Silver City.

Secret merger talks between the BAS Group and the airlines that would have constituted British United Airways began during 1961. BUA's takeover of BAS was officially announced in January 1962. Air Holdings, a new holding company set up by BUA's shareholders in November 1961 to facilitate the creation of a large private sector airline through additional acquisitions of rival independent airlines, took full control of BAS and BUA by purchasing both airlines' entire share capital. The acquisition of BAS made BUA almost half the size of British European Airways (BEA) and created an airline that accounted for more than half the capacity of the UK's entire independent airline sector. It also made BUA the largest unsubsidised, private sector airline outside the United States, with total assets of about £20m and more than 4,000 employees. The BUA-BAS merger furthermore removed BUA's last remaining independent competitor in the car ferry business. The addition of Silver City's 650,000 annual ferry passengers increased the yearly combined total to just under one million. This translated into a two-thirds share of BUA's total passengers compared with just a quarter of BUA's one million passengers per annum prior to BAS's acquisition.

== Subsidiaries ==
- British Aviation Services (Malta) Ltd (1946-1947)
- Silver City Airways (1949–1962)
- Air Kruise (1953–1958)
- Aquila Airways (1953–1958)
- Manx Airlines (1955–1957)
- Dragon Airways (1957)
- Lancashire Aircraft Corp. (1956–1958)
- Channel Air Bridge (1959–1960)

== Fleet ==
The BAS Group's airline subsidiaries operated the following aircraft types:

- Airspeed Consul AS.65
- Bristol 170 Freighter Mark 31
- Bristol 170 Superfreighter Mark 32
- de Havilland DH 89 Dragon Rapide
- de Havilland DH 114 Heron
- Douglas DC-2
- Douglas DC-3
- Handley Page Hermes HP.81
- Short Solent

=== 1958 fleet ===
In April 1958, the BAS Group fleet comprised 43 aircraft.

Aircraft	Number
Handley Page Hermes	5
Bristol 170 Superfreighter Mark 32	14
Bristol 170 Freighter Mark 31	7
Douglas DC-3	7
Douglas DC-2	1
Short Solent	3
de Havilland DH 114 Heron	2
de Havilland DH 89 Dragon Rapide	3
Airspeed Consul	1
Total	43

== Accidents and incidents ==
There are two recorded accidents involving Britavia aircraft. One of these was fatal

1. The non-fatal accident occurred on 5 August 1956. The aircraft, a Handley Page HP.81 Hermes 4A (registration: G-ALDK), undershot the runway while attempting to land on runway 08 at the Drigh Road Pakistan Air Force (PAF) Base in heavy rain, which the pilot in command mistook for Karachi International Airport's runway 07. Although the accident destroyed the aircraft, all 72 occupants (seven crew members and 65 passengers) survived. The subsequent accident investigation established the failure of the aircraft's left windscreen wiper as the primary cause. It furthermore identified the pilot's mistake in confusing runway 08 at Drigh Road PAF Base with runway 07 at Karachi International Airport when landing in meteorological conditions below those recommended as minima by the Pakistan Department of Civil Aviation as a secondary cause.
1. The fatal accident occurred on 5 November 1956. The aircraft, a Handley Page HP.81 Hermes 4A (registration: G-ALDJ), operated an international non-scheduled passenger flight from Blackbushe via Malta and Cyprus to Tripoli and back. The first stop at Malta involved a crew change. Due to the flight arriving at Tripoli's King Idris Airport five hours late, there was a reduced rest time for the crew that had taken over the aircraft in Malta. However, this was insufficient to prevent a delayed takeoff from Idris Airport. Before the aircraft was due to land at Blackbushe Airport, it was cleared to Blackbushe beacon at 2,000 ft (610 m) for a final approach to runway 08. Two minutes after the flightdeck crew reported passing the beacon at 2,000 ft (610 m), the procedure turn was completed at 1,500 ft (460 m). The aircraft was cleared to land after it had passed the Outer Marker, following which the aircraft descended below the ILS glide slope. It hit a beech tree 3,617 ft (1,102 m) short of the runway threshold, swerved to the left and came to a halt in a group of pine trees 3,000 ft (910 m) further on. The accident destroyed the aircraft and killed seven of the 80 occupants (three out of six crew members and four out of 74 passengers). The subsequent accident investigation established the captain's fatigue while operating in difficult conditions, as well as his misjudgement of the aircraft's height based on his vision of the airport lights, as the probable cause.

== See also ==
- List of defunct airlines of the United Kingdom

== Notes ==
Notes

Citations
