= Short Seaford =

1940s military flying boat

S.45 Seaford
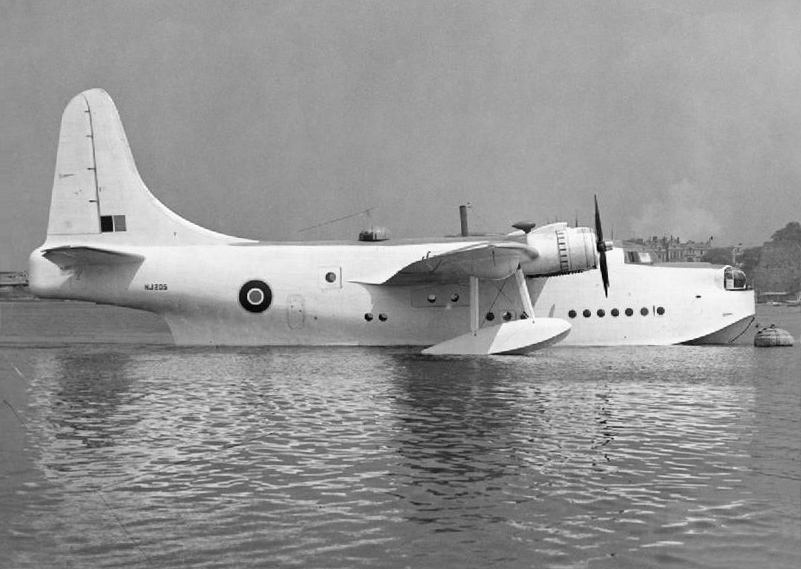
- Seaford NJ205 at Rochester, July 1946

General information
- Type: Flying boat
- National origin: United Kingdom
- Manufacturer: Short Brothers
- Primary user: Royal Air Force
- Number built: 10

History
- First flight: 30 August 1944
- Developed from: Short Sunderland
- Variant: Short Solent

The Short S.45 Seaford was a 1940s flying boat, designed as a long range maritime patrol bomber for RAF Coastal Command. It was developed from the Short S.25 Sunderland, and initially ordered as "Sunderland Mark IV".

== Background ==
In 1942, the Air Ministry issued Specification R.8/42 for a replacement of the Sunderland, as a long range patrol bomber for service in the Pacific Ocean. It required more powerful engines, better defensive armament, and other enhancements.

== Design and development ==
The Sunderland Mark IV used major structural elements of the Sunderland Mark III, with a fuselage stretch of 3 ft ahead of the wing, an extended and redesigned planing bottom, the same wing with thicker Duralumin skinning, and Bristol Hercules engines. Further structural changes were made after initial flight tests. The planned armament consisted of two fixed forward-firing .303 inch (7.7 mm) Browning machine guns in the nose, a Brockhouse Engineering nose turret with twin .50 in (12.7 mm) machine guns, twin 20 mm Hispano cannon mounted in a Bristol B.17 dorsal turret, twin .50 in (12.7 mm) guns in a Glenn-Martin tail turret, and another .50 in (12.7 mm) machine gun in a hand-held waist position on each side of the fuselage. The turrets were all electrically powered. Two prototypes and thirty production aircraft were ordered as the Sunderland Mark IV.

== Operational history ==
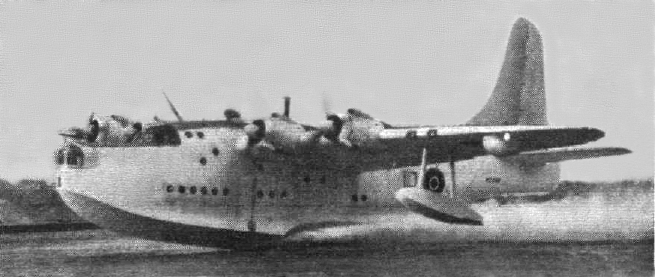

On 30 August 1944, the prototype (MZ269) first flew from the River Medway at Rochester. The increased engine power caused aerodynamic stability problems, and a new fin was designed with greater height with forward dorsal extension, plus a new tailplane with increased span and area. Changes were so extensive that the new aircraft was given the name Seaford. Thirty production aircraft were ordered, but the first of these flew in April 1945, well after the introduction of the Sunderland Mark V, and too late to see combat in Europe. The prototypes were powered by Hercules XVII engines of 1,680 hp (1,253 kW), but production aircraft used 1,720 hp (1,283 kW) Hercules XIX engines. The planned Glenn Martin tail turrets were never installed. Eight production Seafords were completed; the first (NJ200) was used for trials at MAEE Felixstowe. The second production Seaford (NJ201) was evaluated by RAF Transport Command, then in December 1945 it was loaned without armament to BOAC as G-AGWU, then returned to MAEE as NJ201 in February 1946. In April 1946, the other six production Seafords were delivered to No. 201 Squadron RAF for brief operational trials. In 1948, those six aircraft were modified as civilian airliners at Belfast, then leased to BOAC with the designation Solent 3.

== Operators ==
United Kingdom

- British Overseas Airways Corporation
- Royal Air Force
  - No. 201 Squadron RAF

== Surviving aircraft ==
Short S.45 Seaford NJ203, converted to a Short Solent in 1948, is displayed at the Oakland Aviation Museum, Oakland, California.

== Specifications (S.45 Seaford) ==
Data from Green and Jane's Fighting Aircraft of World War II

General characteristics

- Crew: 8–11 (two pilots, radio operator, navigator, engineer, bomb-aimer, three to five gunners)
- Length: 88 ft 6 3/4 in (26.994 m)
- Wingspan: 112 ft 9 1/2 in (34.379 m)
- Height: 37 ft 3 in (11.35 m)
- Wing area: 1,487 sq ft (138.1 m^{2})
- Empty weight: 45,000 lb (20,412 kg)
- Gross weight: 75,000 lb (34,019 kg)
- Powerplant: 4 × Bristol Hercules XIX 14-cylinder radial engines, 1,720 hp (1,280 kW) each

Performance

- Maximum speed: 242 mph (389 km/h, 210 kn) at 500 ft (150 m)
- Cruise speed: 207 mph (333 km/h, 180 kn) at 7,000 ft (2,100 m)
- Range: 2,800 mi (4,500 km, 2,400 nmi) normal range
  3,100 mi (5,000 km; 2,700 nmi) overload range
- Service ceiling: 14,000 ft (4,300 m)
- Rate of climb: 875 ft/min (4.45 m/s)
- Time to altitude: 18 min to 10,000 ft (3,000 m)

Armament

- Guns: 6 × .50 in Browning machine guns (two each in nose and tail turrets and two beam guns) 2 × 20 mm Hispano cannon in dorsal turret and 2 × fixed .303 in Browning machine guns
- Bombs: 4,960 lb (2,250 kg) of bombs and depth charges

== See also ==
Aircraft of comparable role, configuration, and era

- Kawanishi H8K

Related lists

- List of aircraft of the Royal Air Force

== Bibliography ==
- Barnes, C.H. Shorts Aircraft since 1900. Putnam, 1967, 1989 ISBN 0-85177-819-4
- Green, William. War Planes of the Second World War: Volume Five Flying Boats. Macdonald, 1968. ISBN 0-356-01449-5.
- Jane's Fighting Aircraft of World War II. New York: Military Press. 1989. ISBN 0517679647.
- London, Peter. British Flying Boats. Sutton Publishing, 2003. ISBN 0-7509-2695-3.
- Ogden, Bob (2007). Aviation Museums and Collections of North America. Air-Britain. ISBN 0-85130-385-4
- Warner, Guy (July–August 2002). "From Bombay to Bombardier: Aircraft Production at Sydenham, Part One". Air Enthusiast. No. 100. pp. 13–24. ISSN 0143-5450.
