= Alameda Naval Air Museum =

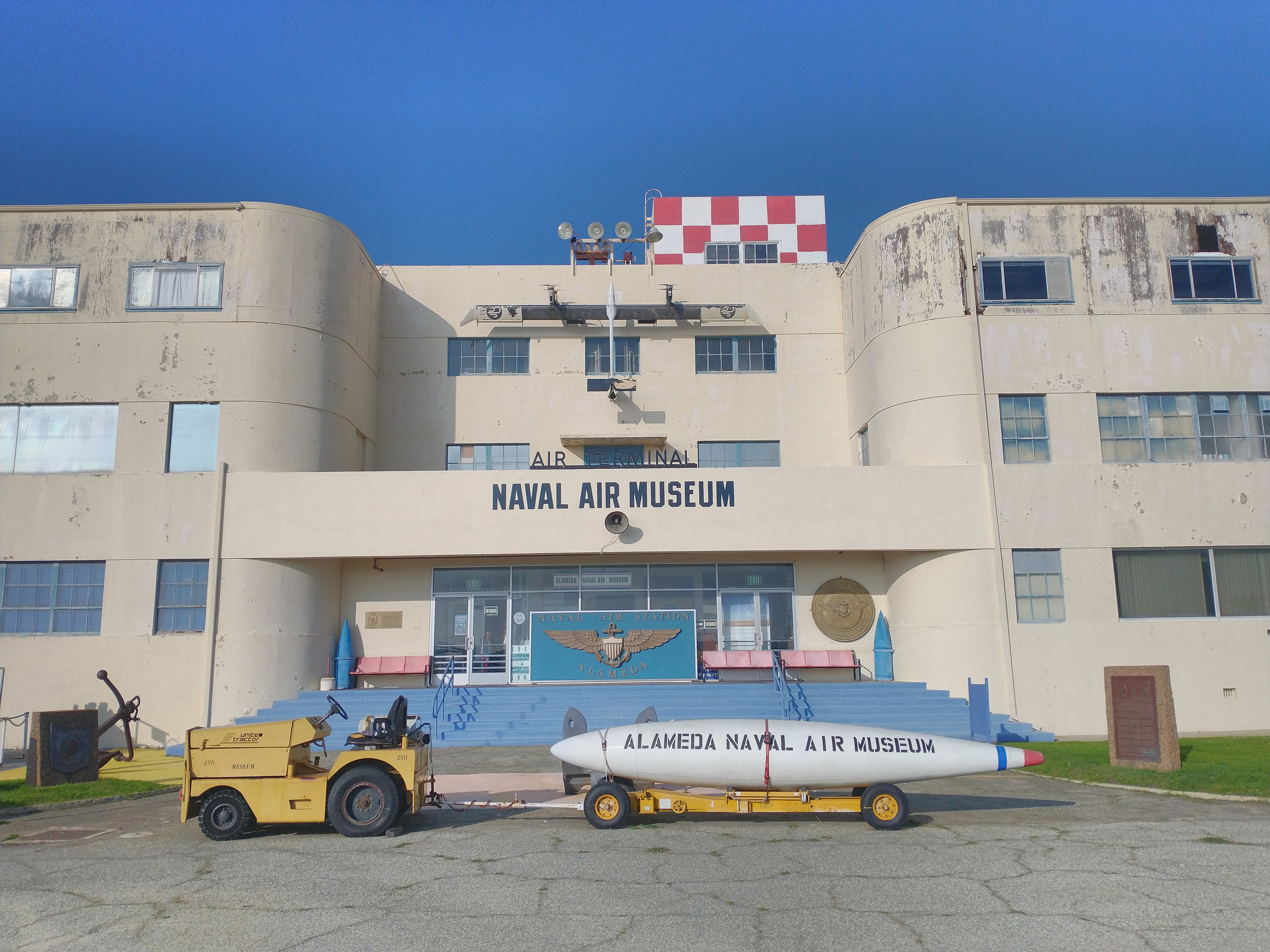
- Museum building

- Location within California
- Established: 1995
- Location: Alameda, California
- Coordinates: 37.7814°N 122.2992°W
- Type: Aviation museum
- Website: www.alamedanavalairmuseum.org

The Alameda Naval Air Museum is an aviation museum located in Alameda, California and focused on the history of Naval Air Station Alameda.

== History ==
In 1993, following a Base Realignment and Closure commission decision, it was announced that Naval Air Station Alameda would be shut down. In anticipation of the closure, Barbara Baack and Marilyn York, former WAVES, opened the museum in the 118,000 sq ft (11,000 m^{2}) Hangar 41 in 1995. However, the poor condition of the hangar and a lack of money for upgrades forced it to move the collection into storage in 1997. (Note: Around this time, the museum collaborated with the Western Air Museum to create a proposal for an Alameda Sea, Air and Space Museum.) Then, in April 2001, the museum's lease for the hangar expired. As a result, it moved to the 21,000 sq ft (2,000 m^{2}) Building 77, the former air terminal, where it reopened in 2004.

== Exhibits ==
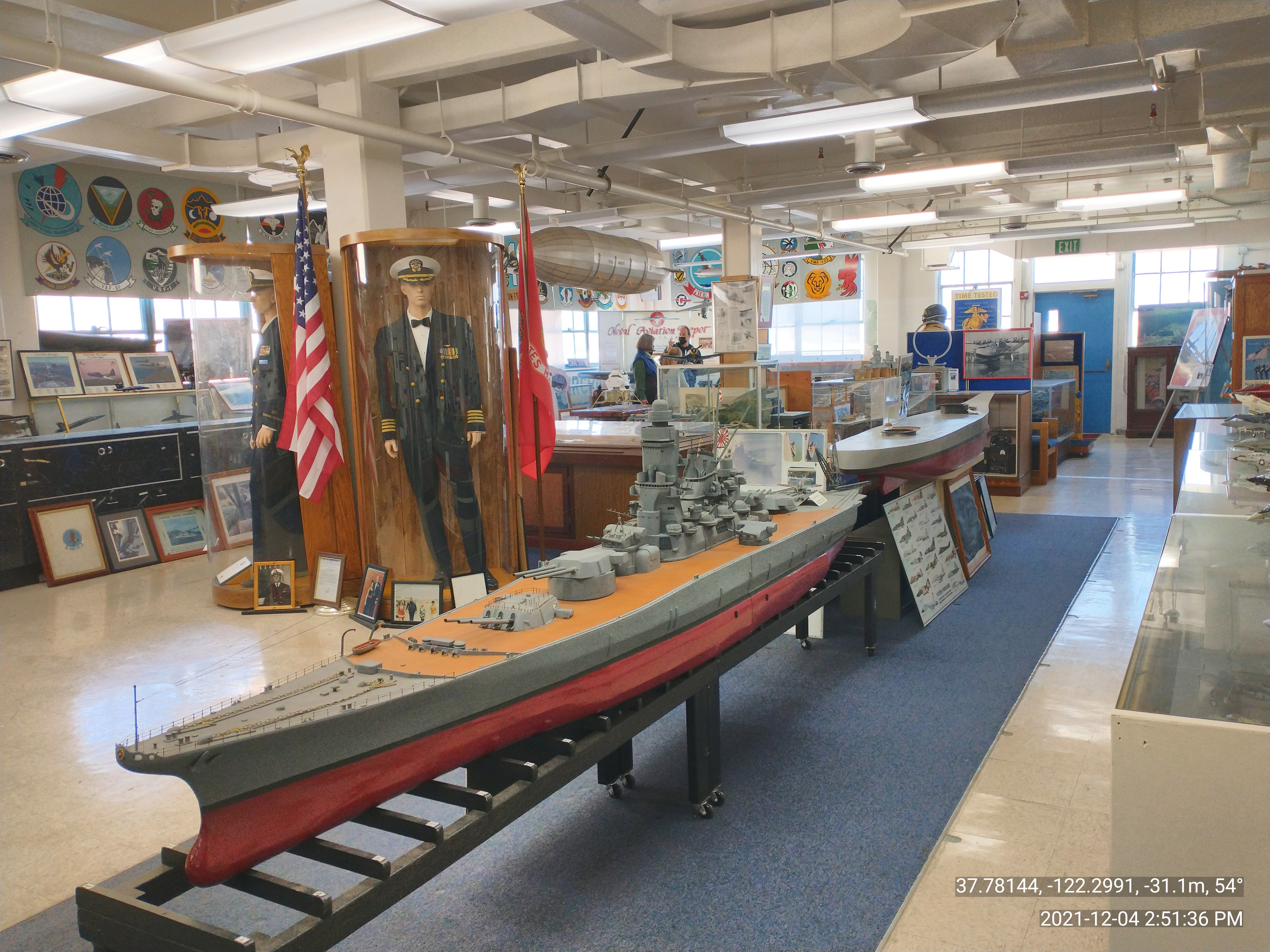
Interior of the museum

Exhibits at the museum include a 40 mm Bofors anti-aircraft gun, scale models of the Japanese battleship Yamato and the flying boat China Clipper, a flight simulator, a Battle of Midway diorama and a recreation of a ship's sick bay.

== See also ==
- List of aviation museums
- Oakland Aviation Museum
- USS Hornet Sea, Air & Space Museum
