= Aquila Airways =

Airline of the United Kingdom

- Solent 3 taking-off from Funchal
- Founded: 18 May 1948
- Commenced operations: 1948
- Ceased operations: 1958
- Fleet size: See Aircraft operated below
- Destinations: See below
- Parent company: British Aviation Services Group
- Headquarters: Southampton, Hampshire, United Kingdom
- Key people: Barry Aikman (Founder)

Aquila Airways was a British independent (Note: independent from government-owned corporations) airline, formed on 18 May 1948 and based in Southampton, Hampshire.

== History ==
Aquila was founded by Barry Aikman, initially using two converted Royal Air Force Short Sunderland flying boats, ex-British Overseas Airways Corporation (BOAC), for freight work. During the Berlin Airlift a further 10 Sunderland 3s were acquired, and these flew a total of 265 supply missions during 1948/49 from Finkenwerder on the river Elbe to the river Havel on the outskirts of Berlin.

=== Operations during 1949–1951 ===
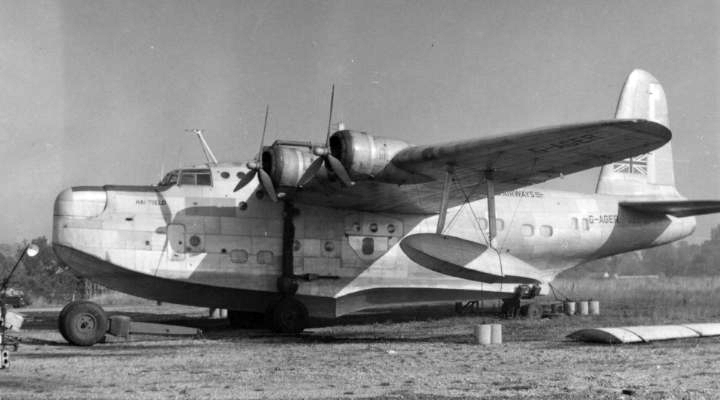
Short Sunderland 3 G-AGER Hadfield operated from 1948 to 1956. At Hamble Beach 1955

After the end of the Berlin Airlift, Aquila hoped to find work for their fleet on worldwide ad hoc passenger and freight charters, but this plan quickly proved unsuccessful.

Aquila obtained an association agreement with British European Airways (BEA) under which they were permitted to operate scheduled services from Southampton to Lisbon and Madeira. These flight were supplemented by charter flights to a wide variety of destinations. June 1949 brought a series of Sunderland 3 flights with holidaymakers from Falmouth, Cornwall to the Isles of Scilly. Other 1949 charters included seamen from Aden to the UK and from Hull to Helsinki.

The popular Madeira service continued in 1950/51 and was joined by a Southampton to Jersey service from 7 July 1950, which used St Aubins Bay to land its passengers. The airline also provided charter flights for shipping firms.

=== Operations during 1952 ===
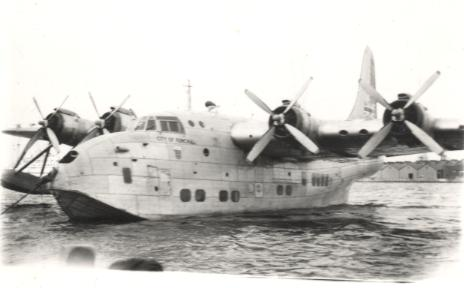
Short Solent 4 G-ANAJ City of Funchal at Berth 50, Southampton Docks in 1955

In 1952 Short Solents were acquired second hand. The airline continued to operate schedules to Madeira and the Canary Islands with the newly acquired aircraft.

In 1954 the British Aviation Services Group took control of Aquila Airways, the last commercial flying boat operator in the UK.

Suez Crisis. In 1956 an Aquila Airways flying boat was used to evacuate civilian Suez Canal Company personnel, together with their families, from the Great Bitter Lake to Southampton water, via Grand Harbour, Malta.

During the later 1950s, Aquila Airways faced increasing competition from land based aircraft and being unable to obtain replacement flying boats (offers to purchase the prototype Princess flying boats having been rebuffed), the company announced in July 1958 it would cease operating. This left TEAL as the only long range flying boat passenger airline.

== Fleet ==
- Short Sandringham I
- Short Solent 2
- Short Solent 3
- Short Solent 4
- Short Sunderland 3

== Accidents and incidents ==
1. 21 January 1953 - Short S25 Sunderland 3 registered G-AGJN damaged beyond repair at Funchal Bay, Funchal (Madeira Island)
2. 28 January 1953 - Short S25 Sunderland 3 registered G-AGKY was damaged during takeoff from Southampton and subsequently capsized and sank at Calshot without injuries to its occupants.
3. 15 November 1957 - Short S45 Solent 3 registered G-AKNU crashed while taking-off into Chessell Down, Isle of Wight killing 45 out of the 58 on board. The investigation established that engines 3 and 4 stopped running.

== See also ==
- List of defunct airlines of the United Kingdom

== Notes and citations ==
Notes

Citations

== Bibliography ==
- Merton Jones, A.C. (1976). British Independent Airlines since 1946. Maidenhead (U.K.): LAAS International and Merseyside Aviation Society. pp. 55–56. ISBN 0 902420 07 0.
- "Flight International". Flight International. Sutton, UK: Reed Business Information. ISSN 0015-3710. (various backdated issues relating to Britavia and British Aviation Services, 1948–1958)
