= Oakland Aviation Museum =

Museum in Oakland, California, US

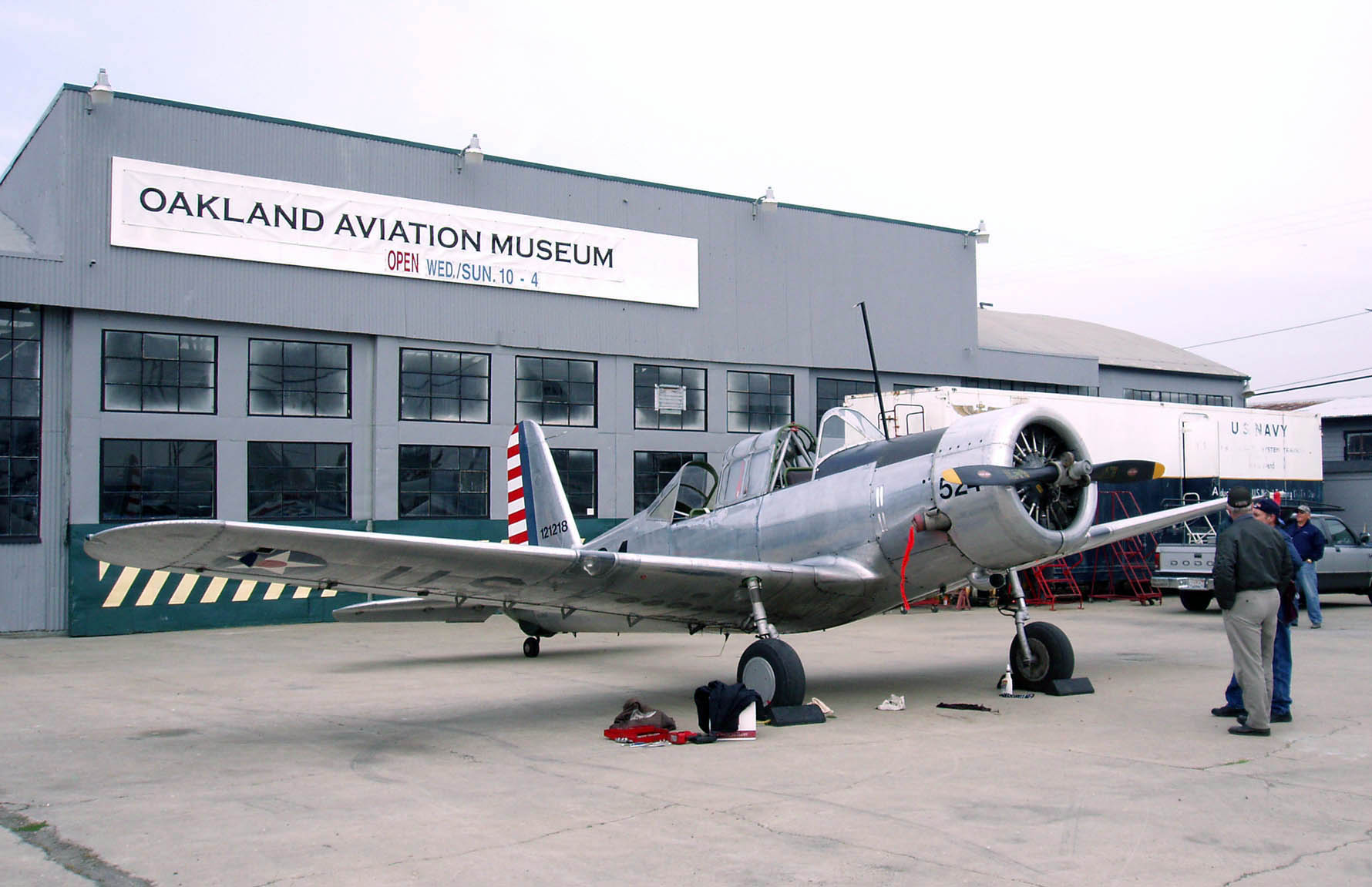
- A BT-13 in front of the museum

- Location within California
- Former name: Western Aerospace Museum
- Established: 1980
- Location: Oakland, California
- Coordinates: 37°43′59.16″N 122°12′45.77″W
- Type: Aviation museum
- Founder: Ron Reuther
- Parking: On site
- Website: www.oaklandaviationmuseum.org

Oakland Aviation Museum, formerly called Western Aerospace Museum, in an aviation museum located at North Field of Oakland San Francisco Bay Airport in Oakland, California. It has over 30 vintage and modern airplanes, both civilian and military, and other displays that highlight noted aviators and innovators.

== History ==
The museum was established in 1980 by Ron Reuther and opened in 1986 in a room inside Hangar 5 at Oakland San Francisco Bay Airport.

A Short Solent was moved to the museum in 1987. The following year, the museum moved to Building 621, the former Boeing School of Aeronautics, which was built in 1940. Then, in 1989, the museum received a Lockheed Electra.

The museum began a project to make its Short Solent airworthy in 1992.

The museum announced it would expand to Hangar 41 at the former Naval Air Station Alameda in 1998.

The sole Thorp T-3B was donated to the museum in 2012-2013.

== Collection ==
=== Aircraft ===
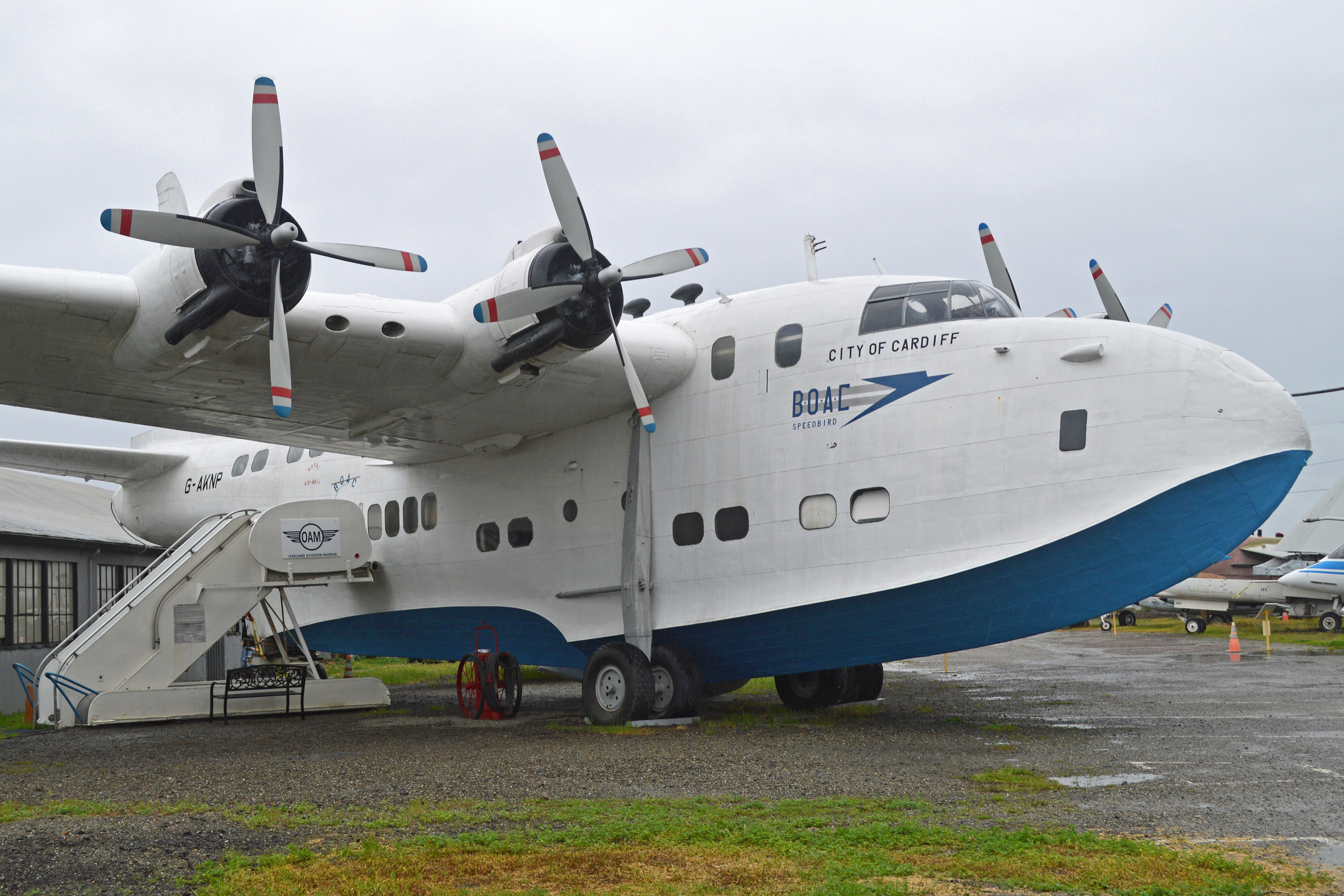
Short Solent Mark III at the Oakland Aviation Museum

- Aeronca 7AC Champion
- Cessna O-2A Skymaster
- Denney Kitfox IV 1200
- Douglas KA-3B Skywarrior
- Douglas NTA-4J Skyhawk
- ERCO 415-C Ercoupe
- Grumman KA-6D Intruder
- Grumman NF-14A Tomcat
- Hawker Siddeley TAV-8A Harrier
- Hiller Ten99
- JDT 1600R EROS
- Jurca MJ-7 Gnatsum
- Kitty Hawk Flyer eVTOL
- LTV A-7E Corsair II
- Mikoyan-Gurevich MiG-15bis
- North American T-39 Saberliner
- Rutan VariEze
- Rutan VariEze
- Short Solent III
- Stoddard-Hamilton Glasair Super II RG
- Thorp/Paulic T3B-1
- Wright EX Vin Fiz Flyer – replica

=== Engines ===
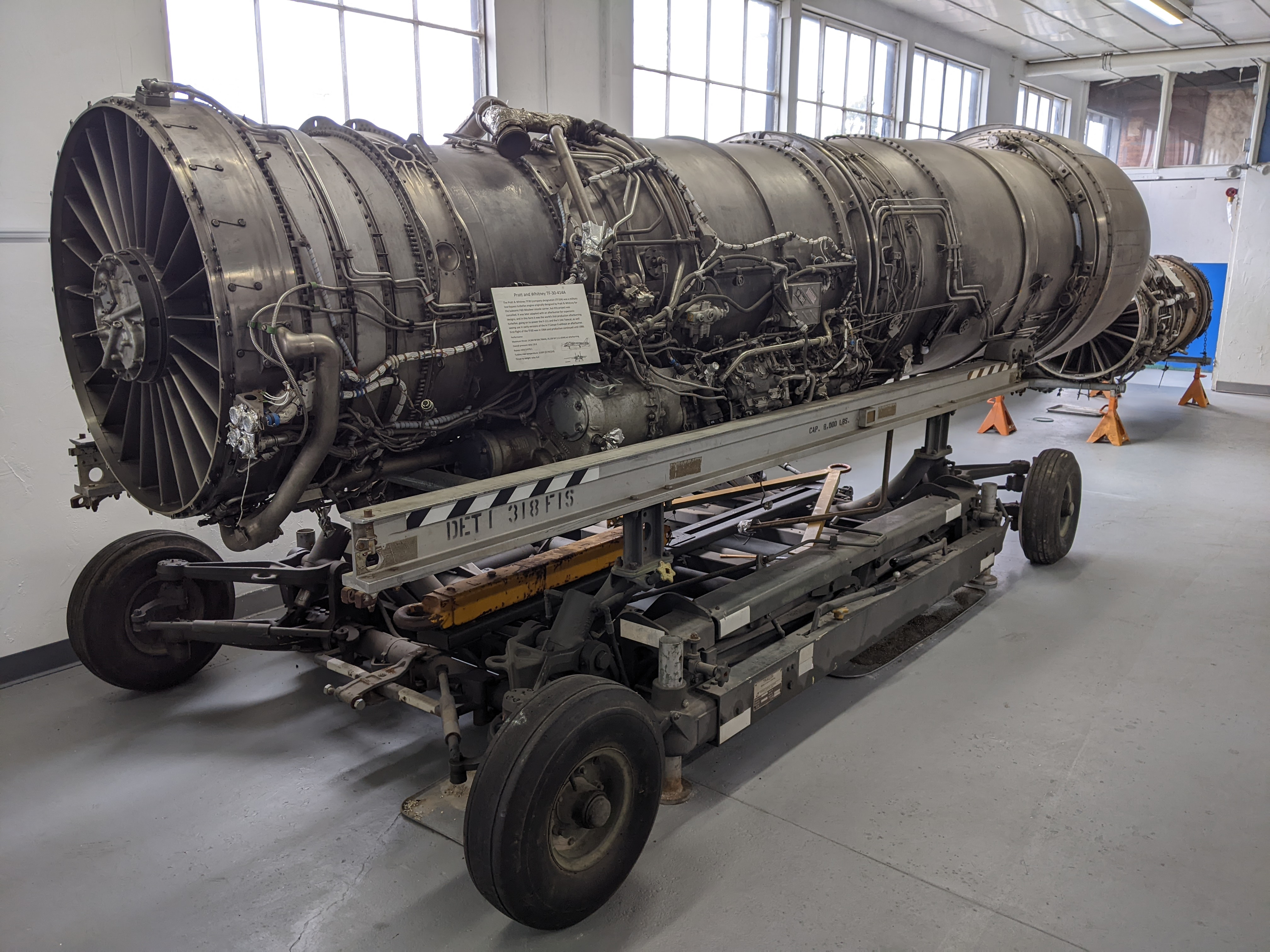
Pratt & Whitney TF30-414A Turbofan at the Oakland Aviation Museum

- Allison T56 Series III
- Andover V-32
- Elizalde Tigre IV
- Franklin O-200 (4AC-199)
- Galino-Taski
- Garrett GTP70
- General Electric J47
- General Electric J79
- Heath-Henderson B-4
- Herring-Curtiss
- Lycoming R-680
- McCulloch 4318A
- Pancake V-8
- Pratt & Whitney R-2800 Double Wasp
- Pratt & Whitney R-985-AN-1 Wasp Junior
- Pratt & Whitney TF30-414A
- Ranger V-770
- Righter O-45
- Wright R-3350 Duplex-Cyclone

=== Other ===
- ADM-20 Quail

== Exhibits ==
The museum contains several galleries with exhibits, some of which emphasize the role Oakland and surrounding areas have played in the history of aviation. These include an aircraft engine room, the Eighth Air Force, Jimmy Doolittle, United States naval aviation, the Tuskegee Airmen, women in aviation, Transocean Air Lines, World Airways and Trans International Airlines.

== Events ==
The museum hosts a number of special events including open cockpit days.

== Programs ==
The museum previously hosted a Summer Flight Academy for teenagers.

== See also ==
- Alameda Naval Air Museum
- List of aviation museums
- USS Hornet Sea, Air & Space Museum
