= South Pacific Air Lines =

US carrier (1960–1963) that merged with Pan Am

IATA	ICAO	Call sign
SF^{(1)}	SF^{(1)}	—
- Founded: 9 December 1952 incorporated in California
- Commenced operations: April 2, 1960
- Ceased operations: December 7, 1963
- Fleet size: see Fleet
- Destinations: see Destinations
- Headquarters: San Francisco, California, United States
- Key people: Robert Stanley Dollar

Notes
- (1) IATA, ICAO codes were the same until the 1980s

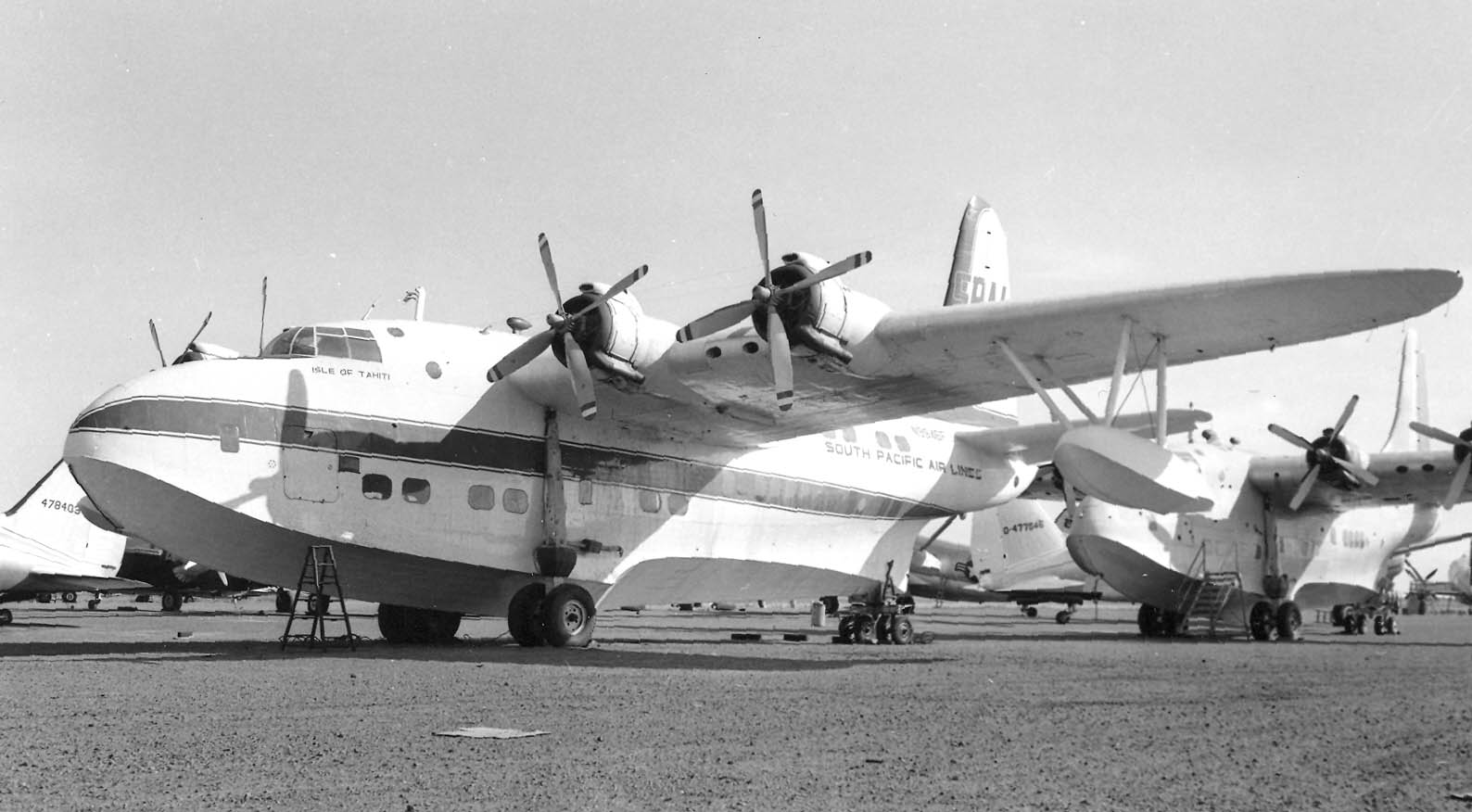
SPAL Short Solent at Oakland in 1955

South Pacific Air Lines (SPAL) was a small US international carrier that flew from Hawaii to Tahiti from 1960 to 1963, later adding American Samoa to its small network. The airline was controlled by the Dollar family. SPAL was tiny, unable to compete with jet carriers and not able to secure sufficient route authority from the Civil Aeronautics Board (CAB) (the now defunct federal agency that then tightly regulated almost all US air transport) to expand. The airline transferred its routes to Pan Am at the end of 1963 and merged into Pan Am in 1964.

See External links for a photo of a SPAL Constellation.

== History ==
The airline was incorporated in California 9 December 1952. SPAL received authority to fly from Hawaii to Tahiti in 1953 from the Civil Aeronautics Board (CAB), initially planning to operate with Short Solent flying boats. The company spent hundreds of thousands of dollars preparing for the service, which depended on transiting Christmas Island. Unfortunately, the United Kingdom decided to use the island for atomic testing.

The airline started flights on 2 April 1960 with Lockheed L-1049 Super Constellations. Less than a year later, the French airline UTA started competing service with jet aircraft. In 1961, SPAL also received authority to fly from Hawaii to Fiji via American Samoa and Western Samoa. It started service to Pago Pago in 1962. However, SPAL was denied Mainland US to Hawaii authority and nonstop US mainland to Tahiti service.

SPAL, with limited resources, was unable to compete. It entered into a route lease agreement with Pan Am for its routes in December 1963, flying its last flight December 6–7. In April 1964, the CAB approved a merger between Pan Am and SPAL.

In 1963 its fleet consisted of two L-1049s propliners and the airline was headquartered in San Francisco.

== Fleet ==
- 2 L-1049 Super Constellation

The company also invested in Short Solent flying boats, but never operated them in scheduled service.

== Destinations ==
According to its May 16, 1962 system timetable, the airline was operating two routes: Honolulu - Papeete, Tahiti with one round trip nonstop flight a week and Honolulu - Pago Pago - Papeete, Tahiti also flown round trip once a week with both services being operated with L-1049 Super Constellation aircraft with the flight between Honolulu and Pago Pago also offering flag stop service into Canton Island.

== See also ==
- List of defunct airlines of the United States
