= Bristol Hercules =

Radial aircraft engine by Bristol Engine Company

Hercules
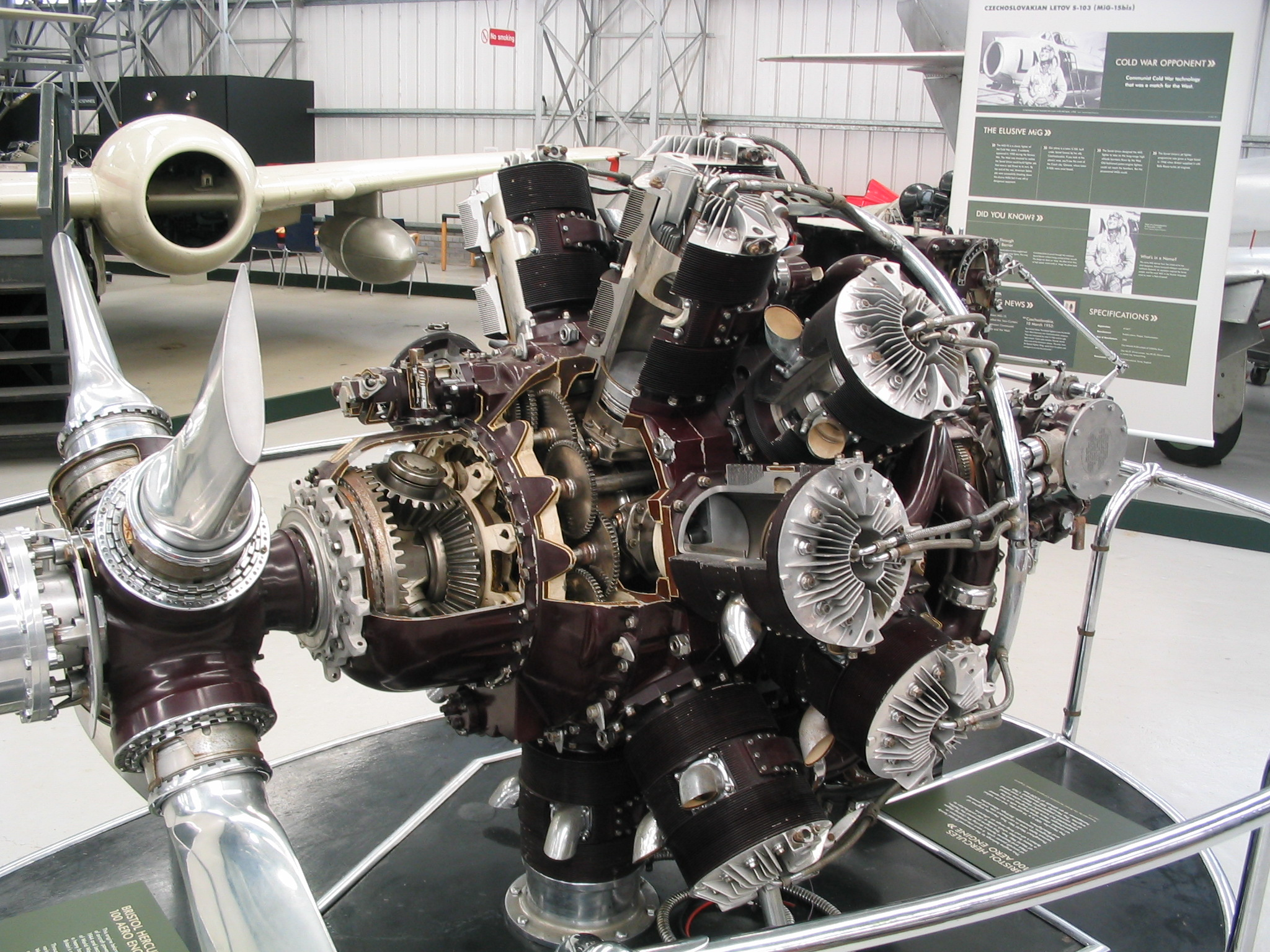
- Cutaway Bristol Hercules engine at the National Museum of Flight, East Fortune, Scotland
- Type: Piston aircraft engine
- National origin: United Kingdom
- Manufacturer: Bristol Aeroplane Company
- First run: January 1936
- Major applications: Bristol Beaufighter; Short Stirling; Handley Page Halifax
- Number built: 57,400
- Developed from: Bristol Perseus
- Developed into: Bristol Centaurus

The Bristol Hercules is a 14-cylinder two-row radial aircraft engine designed by Sir Roy Fedden and produced by the Bristol Engine Company starting in 1939. It was the most numerous of their single sleeve valve (Burt-McCollum, or Argyll, type) designs, powering many aircraft in the mid-World War II timeframe.

The Hercules powered a number of aircraft types, including Bristol's own Beaufighter heavy fighter design, although it was more commonly used on bombers. The Hercules also saw use in civilian designs, culminating in the 735 and 737 engines for such as the Handley Page Hastings C1 and C3 and Bristol Freighter. The design was also licensed for production in France by SNECMA.

== Design and development ==
Shortly after the end of World War I, the Shell company, Asiatic Petroleum, commissioned Harry Ricardo to investigate problems of fuel and engines. His book was published in 1923 as “The Internal Combustion Engine”. Ricardo postulated that the days of the poppet valve were numbered and that a sleeve valve alternative should be pursued.

The rationale behind the single sleeve valve design was two-fold: to provide optimum intake and exhaust gas flow in a two-row radial engine, improving its volumetric efficiency and to allow higher compression ratios, thus improving its thermal efficiency. The arrangement of the cylinders in two-row radials made it very difficult to utilise four valves per cylinder, consequently all non-sleeve valve two- and four-row radials were limited to the less efficient two-valve configuration. Also, as combustion chambers of sleeve-valve engines are uncluttered by valves, especially hot exhaust valves, so being comparatively smooth they allow engines to work with lower octane number fuels using the same compression ratio. Conversely, the same octane number fuel may be utilised while employing a higher compression ratio, or supercharger pressure, thus attaining either higher economy or power output. The downside was the difficulty in maintaining sufficient cylinder and sleeve lubrication.

Manufacturing was also a major problem. Sleeve valve engines, even the mono valve Fedden had elected to use, were extremely difficult to make. Fedden had experimented with sleeve valves in an inverted V-12 as early as 1927 but did not pursue that engine any further. Reverting to nine cylinder engines, Bristol had developed a sleeve valve engine that would actually work by 1934, introducing their first sleeve-valve designs in the 750 horsepower (560 kilowatts) class Perseus and the 500 hp (370 kW) class Aquila that they intended to supply throughout the 1930s. Aircraft development in the era was so rapid that both engines quickly ended up at the low-power end of the military market and, in order to deliver larger engines, Bristol developed 14-cylinder versions of both. The Perseus evolved into the Hercules, and the Aquila into the Taurus.

These smooth-running engines were largely hand-built, which was incompatible with the needs of wartime production. At that time, the tolerances were simply not sufficiently accurate to ensure the mass production of reliable engines. Fedden drove his teams mercilessly, at both Bristol and its suppliers, and thousands of combinations of alloys and methods were tried before a process was discovered which used centrifugal casting to make the sleeves perfectly round. This final success arrived just before the start of the Second World War.

In 1937 Bristol acquired a Northrop Model 8A-1, the export version of the A-17 attack bomber, and modified it as a testbed for the first Hercules engines.

In 1939 Bristol developed a modular engine installation for the Hercules, a so-called "power-egg", allowing the complete engine and cowling to be fitted to any suitable aircraft.

A total of over 57,400 Hercules engines were built.

== Variants ==
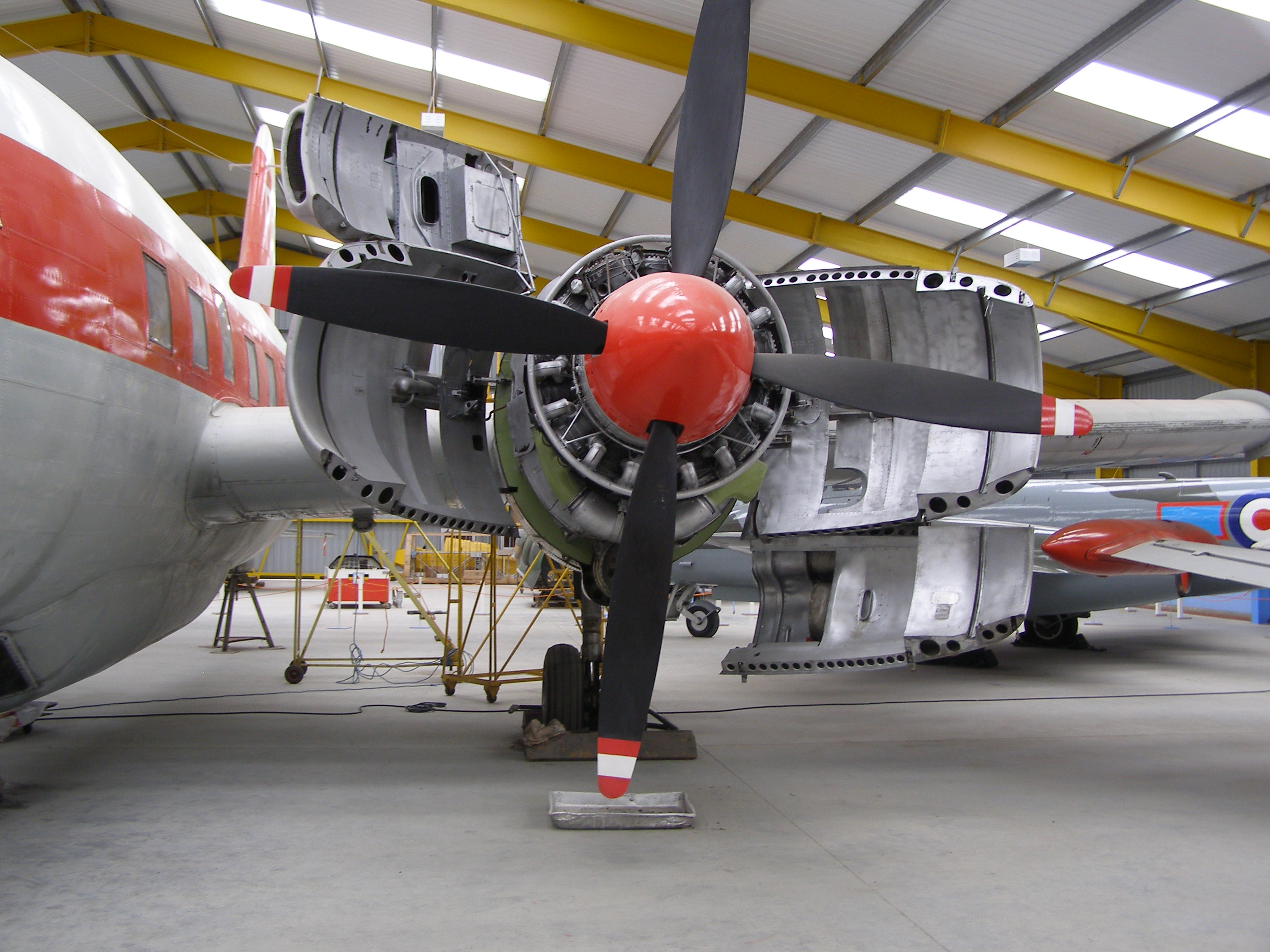
Hercules fitted to a Vickers Varsity on display at the Newark Air Museum

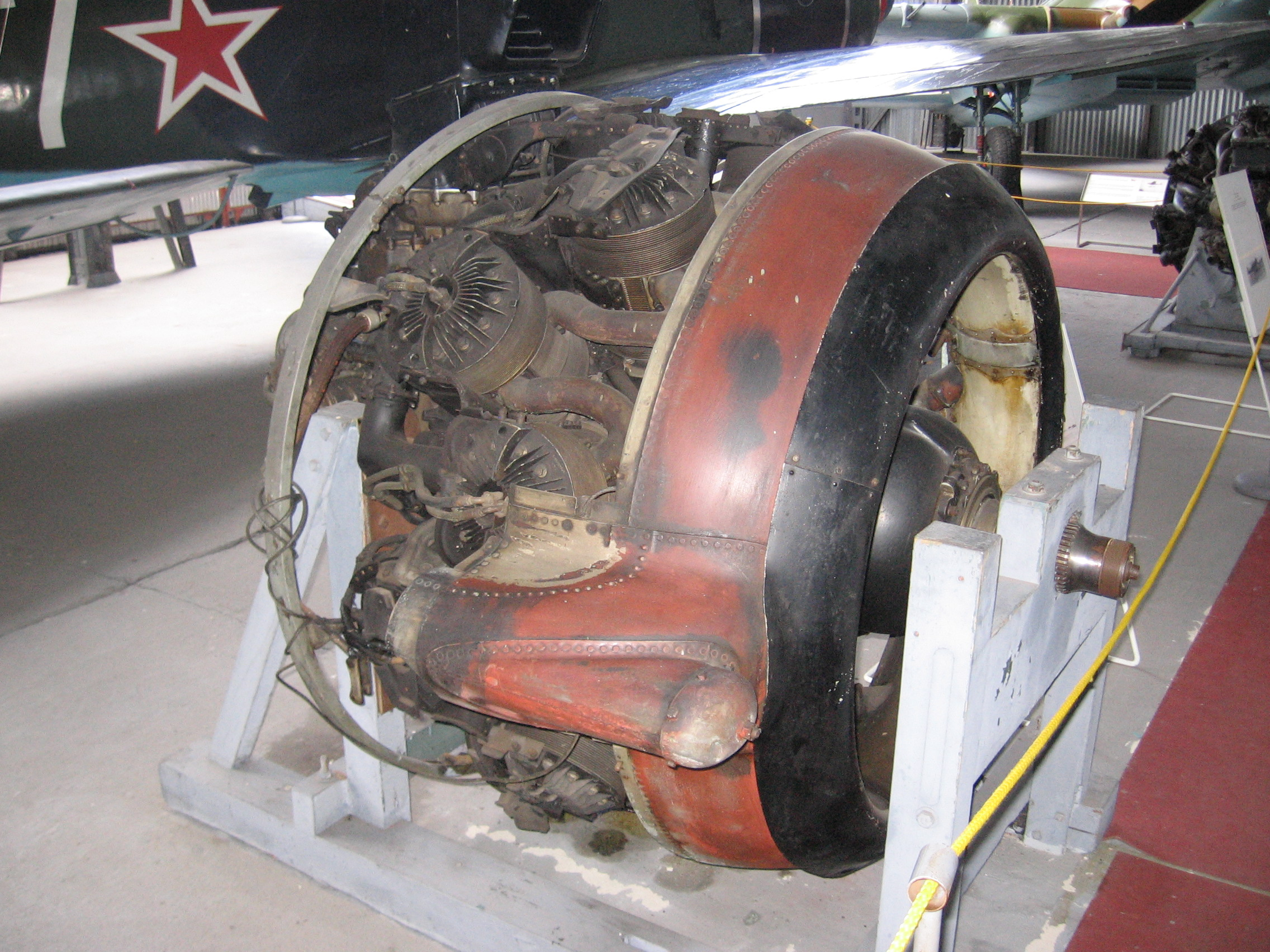
Bristol Hercules in Aviation Museum Kbely, Prague

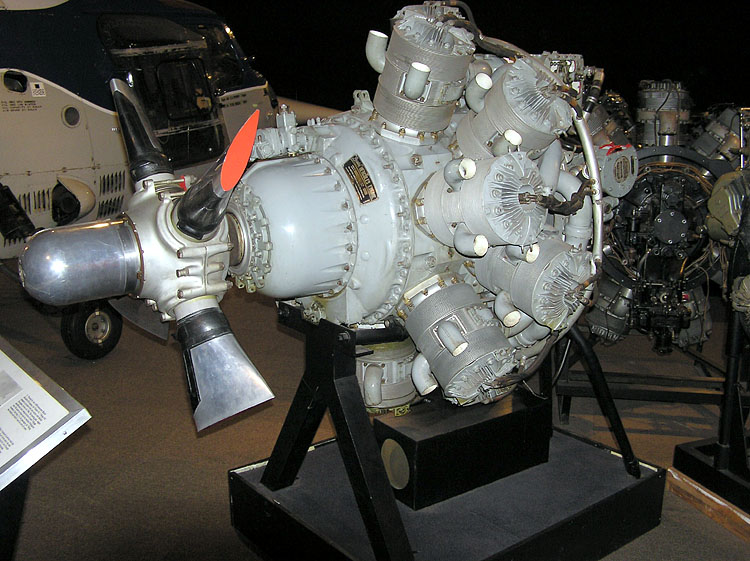
Bristol Hercules engine. Note the absence of pushrods on the cylinders. Each cylinder has two exhaust ports on the front (short L-shaped tubes) and three intake ports on the back supplied through a single manifold.

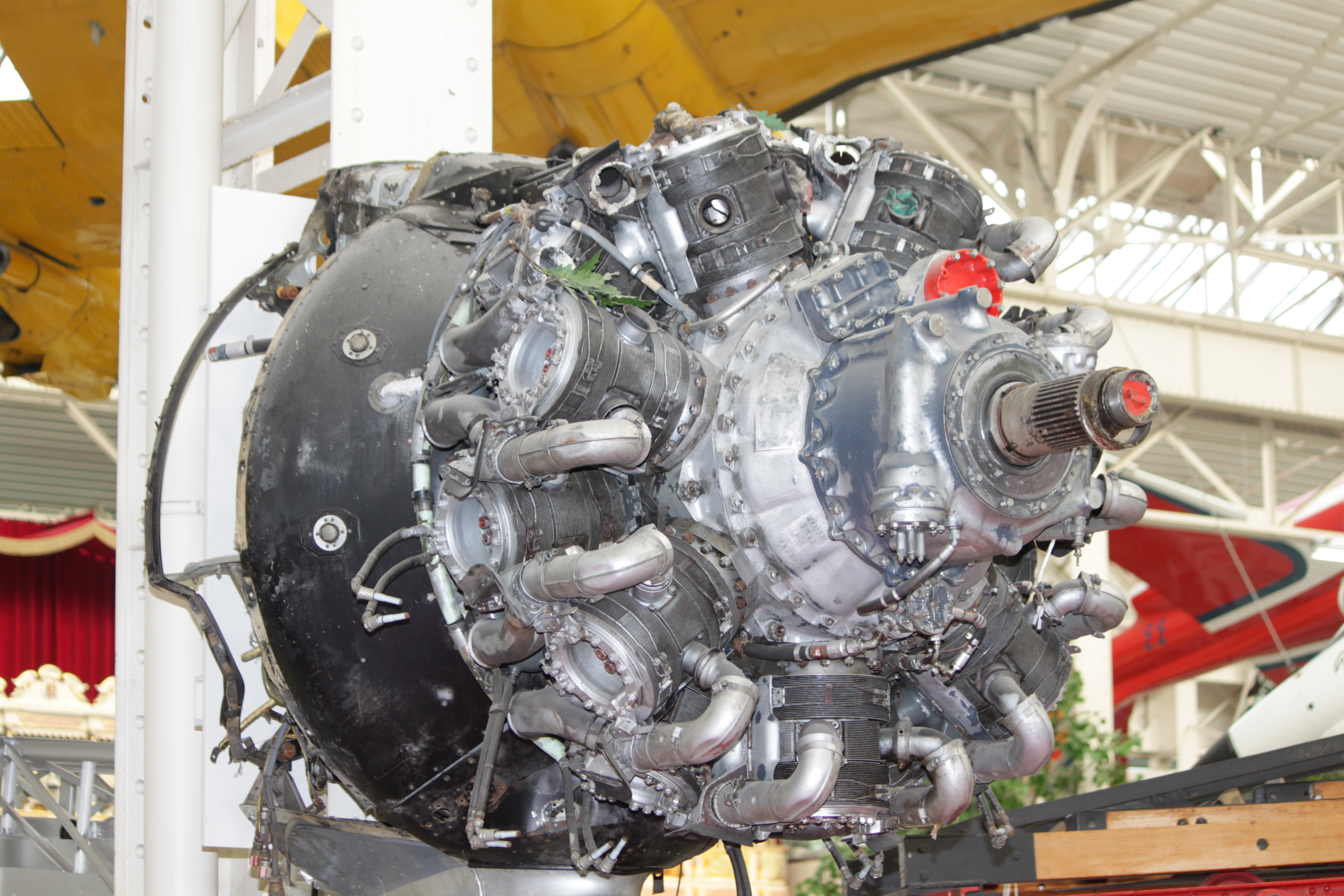
Bristol Hercules XVII engine

Hercules I (1936) – 1,150 hp (860 kW), single-speed supercharger, run on 87 octane fuel.

Hercules II (1938) – 1,375 hp (1,025 kW), single-speed supercharger, run on 87 octane fuel.

Hercules III (1939) – 1,400 hp (1,000 kW), two-speed supercharger, run on either 87 or 100 octane fuel.

Hercules IV (1939) – 1,380 hp (1,030 kW), single-speed supercharger, run on 87 octane fuel.

Hercules V (1939) – 1,380 hp (1,030 kW), civil prototype derived from the Hercules IV but not developed.

Hercules VI (1941) – 1,615 hp (1,204 kW), two-speed supercharger, run on either 87 or 100 octane fuel.

Hercules VII production cancelled.

Hercules VIII – 1,650 hp (1,230 kW), very high-altitude version of the Hercules II, single-speed supercharger with an auxiliary high-altitude single-speed 'S' supercharger.

Hercules X (1941) – 1,420 hp (1,060 kW), derived from the Hercules III.

Hercules XI (1941) – 1,590 hp (1,190 kW), derived from the Hercules III, run on 100 octane fuel.

Hercules XII – derived from the Hercules IV.

Hercules XIV (1942) – 1,500 hp (1,100 kW), developed for the civil market and used by BOAC, run on 100 octane fuel.

Hercules XVMT – 1,650 hp (1,230 kW), very high-altitude development of the Hercules II, single-speed supercharger with an auxiliary high-altitude turbo-supercharger.

Hercules XVI (1942) – 1,615 hp (1,204 kW), two-speed supercharger, run on either 87 or 100 octane fuel.

Hercules XVII (1943) – 1,615 hp (1,204 kW), two-speed supercharger locked in 'M' gear.

Hercules XVIII – low-level development of the Hercules VI with cropped 12 in (300 mm) supercharger impellers.

Hercules XIX (1943) – 1,725 hp (1,286 kW), a development of the Hercules XVII, the two-speed supercharger had cropped 12 in (300 mm) impellers locked in 'M' gear.

Hercules XX – similar to the Hercules XIX.

Hercules 36 – a development engine derived from the Hercules VI and Hercules XVI, run on 100 octane fuel. The Hercules 38 was a further development of the Hercules 36.

Hercules 100 (1944) – 1,675 hp (1,249 kW), the first in a new sub-series of Hercules engines designed primarily for the impending post-war civil market. The entire series was split, some versions had standard epicyclic reduction gearing and parallel versions had a new torquemeter-type reduction gearing.

Hercules 101 – 1,675 hp (1,249 kW), developed from the Hercules 100. The Hercules 103 was the torquemeter version. The Hercules 110 was a further development of the Hercules 101.

Hercules 105 – 1,675 hp (1,249 kW), developed from the Hercules 101 with modified supercharger gears.

Hercules 106 – 1,675 hp (1,249 kW), developed from the Hercules 101. The Hercules 107 was the torquemeter version.

Hercules 120 – 1,715 hp (1,279 kW), high-altitude development of the Hercules 101. The Hercules 121 was the torquemeter version. The Hercules 200 was further modified version of the Hercules 120.

Hercules 130 – 1,715 hp (1,279 kW), development of the Hercules 100. The Hercules 134 was a development with modified mounting ring and exhaust pipes for a rear manifold.

Hercules 216 – 1,675 hp (1,249 kW), development of the Hercules 106 with the Hercules 230 power section and single speed supercharger. Applications:

Hercules 230 – 1,925 hp (1,435 kW), development of the Hercules 130 with the re-designed power section and modified mounting ring and exhaust pipes for a rear manifold. The Hercules 270 was a development. The Hercules 231 and Hercules 271 were the torquemeter versions.

Hercules 232 – modified development of the Hercules 230 for improved performance. The Hercules 233 was the torquemeter version.

Hercules 234 – modified development of the Hercules 232. The Hercules 235 was the torquemeter version. The Hercules 238 was a military version of the Hercules 734 which itself was based on the Hercules 234.

Hercules 260 – modified development of the Hercules 230 to suit reversible propellers. The Hercules 261 was the torquemeter version.

Hercules 264 – 1,950 hp (1,450 kW), a development of the Hercules 260. The Hercules 265 was the torquemeter version.

Hercules 268 – a further development of the Hercules 260. The Hercules 269 was the torquemeter version.

Hercules 630 – 1,675 hp (1,249 kW), a civil development of the Hercules 100. The Hercules 631 was the torquemeter version.

Hercules 632 – 1,690 hp (1,260 kW), a civil-series engine developed from the Hercules 630. The Hercules 633 was the torquemeter version. The Hercules 638 and Hercules 672, along with their torquemeter versions the Hercules 639 and Hercules 673 were developments of the Hercules 632.

Hercules 634 – 1,690 hp (1,260 kW), a civil-series engine developed from the Hercules 630 with modified mounting ring and exhaust pipes for a rear manifold. The Hercules 635 was the torquemeter version.

Hercules 636 – a civil-series engine developed from the Hercules 630 with modified mounting ring and exhaust pipes for a rear manifold. The Hercules 637 was the torquemeter version. The Hercules 637-2 and Hercules 637-3 were further torquemeter developments.

Hercules 730 – 2,040 hp (1,520 kW), a civil-series engine developed from the Hercules 230 and 630 with improved power section, the Hercules 731 was the torquemeter version.

Hercules 732 – a civil-series engine developed from the Hercules 730 with modified mounting ring and exhaust pipes for a rear manifold. The Hercules 733 was the torquemeter version.

Hercules 734 – 1,980 hp (1,480 kW), a civil-series engine developed from the Hercules 730. The Hercules 735 was the torquemeter version. The Hercules 238 was a military version of the civil Hercules 734.

Hercules 736 – 2,040 hp (1,520 kW), a civil-series engine developed from the Hercules 730. The Hercules 737 was the torquemeter version.

Hercules 738 – a civil-series engine developed from the Hercules 730.

Hercules 739 – the torquemeter version of the Hercules 738.

Hercules 750 – a civil-series engine developed from the Hercules 730 to suit braking propellers. The Hercules 751 was the torquemeter version.

Hercules 758 – 2,080 hp (1,550 kW), a civil-series development of the Hercules 750, the Hercules 759 was the torquemeter version. The Hercules 790 and its torquemeter version the Hercules 790 were further developed from the Hercules 758.

Hercules 760 – a civil-series engine developed from the Hercules 730.

Hercules 762 – 2,080 hp (1,550 kW), a civil-series high-altitude development of the Hercules 730 with modified supercharger. The Hercules 763 was the torquemeter version.

Hercules 772 – 1,965 hp (1,465 kW), a civil-series development of the Hercules 762. The Hercules 773 was the torquemeter version.

== Applications ==
Bristol Hercules uses:

- Armstrong Whitworth Albemarle
- Avro Lancaster Mk II
- Avro Tudor VII
- Avro York Mk II
- Bréguet 890H Mercure prototype
- Bristol Beaufighter
- Bristol Freighter
- CASA C-207 Azor
- Fokker T.IX
- Folland Fo.108
- GAL Universal Freighter
- Handley Page Halifax
- Handley Page Halton
- Handley Page Hastings
- Handley Page Hermes
- Nord Noratlas
- Nord Noroit
- Northrop Gamma 2L
- Saro A.36 Lerwick
- Short S.26
- Short Seaford
- Short Solent
- Short Stirling
- SNCASE SE-1010
- Vickers Valetta
- Vickers Varsity
- Vickers VC.1 Viking
- Vickers Wellesley
- Vickers Wellington

== Engines on display ==
- RAF Snaith Museum
- A Bristol Hercules is on public display at the City of Norwich Aviation Museum in Horsham St Faith, Norfolk.
- A Bristol Hercules working module cutaway is on public display at the Trenchard Museum RAF Halton, Halton, Buckinghamshire.
- Two incomplete and badly corroded examples from aircraft lost in the vicinity of Texel and recovered from the sea are on display at the Museum Kaapskil in Oudeschild, Texel, NL.
- A Bristol Hercules is on public display at the Bomber Command Museum of Canada in Nanton, Alberta

== Specifications (Hercules II) ==
Data from Lumsden.

=== General characteristics ===
- Type: 14-cylinder, two-row, supercharged, air-cooled radial engine
- Bore: 5.75 in (146 mm)
- Stroke: 6.5 in (165 mm)
- Displacement: 2,360 cu in (38.7 L)
- Length: 53.15 in (1,350 mm)
- Diameter: 55 in (1,400 mm)
- Dry weight: 1,929 pounds (875 kg)

=== Components ===
- Valvetrain: Gear-driven sleeve valves with five ports per sleeve — three intake and two exhaust
- Supercharger: Single-speed centrifugal type supercharger
- Fuel system: Claudel-Hobson carburettor
- Fuel type: 87 Octane petrol
- Cooling system: Air-cooled
- Reduction gear: Farman epicyclic gearing, 0.44:1

=== Performance ===
- Power output:
- 1,272 hp (949 kW) at 2,800 rpm for takeoff
- 1,356 hp (1,011 kW) at 2,750 rpm at 4,000 ft (1,200 m)
- Specific power: 0.57 hp/in³ (26.15 kW/L)
- Compression ratio: 7.0:1
- Specific fuel consumption: 0.43 lb/(hp•h) (261 g/(kW•h))
- Power-to-weight ratio: 0.7 hp/lb (1.16 kW/kg)

== See also ==
Related development

- Bristol Perseus
- Bristol Centaurus

Comparable engines

- BMW 801
- Pratt & Whitney R-1830
- Pratt & Whitney R-2000
- Wright R-2600
- Fiat A.74
- Fiat A.80
- Gnome-Rhône 14N
- Mitsubishi Kinsei
- Nakajima Sakae
- Shvetsov ASh-82

Related lists

- List of aircraft engines
