= USS Hornet Sea, Air & Space Museum =

Museum in Alameda, California, US

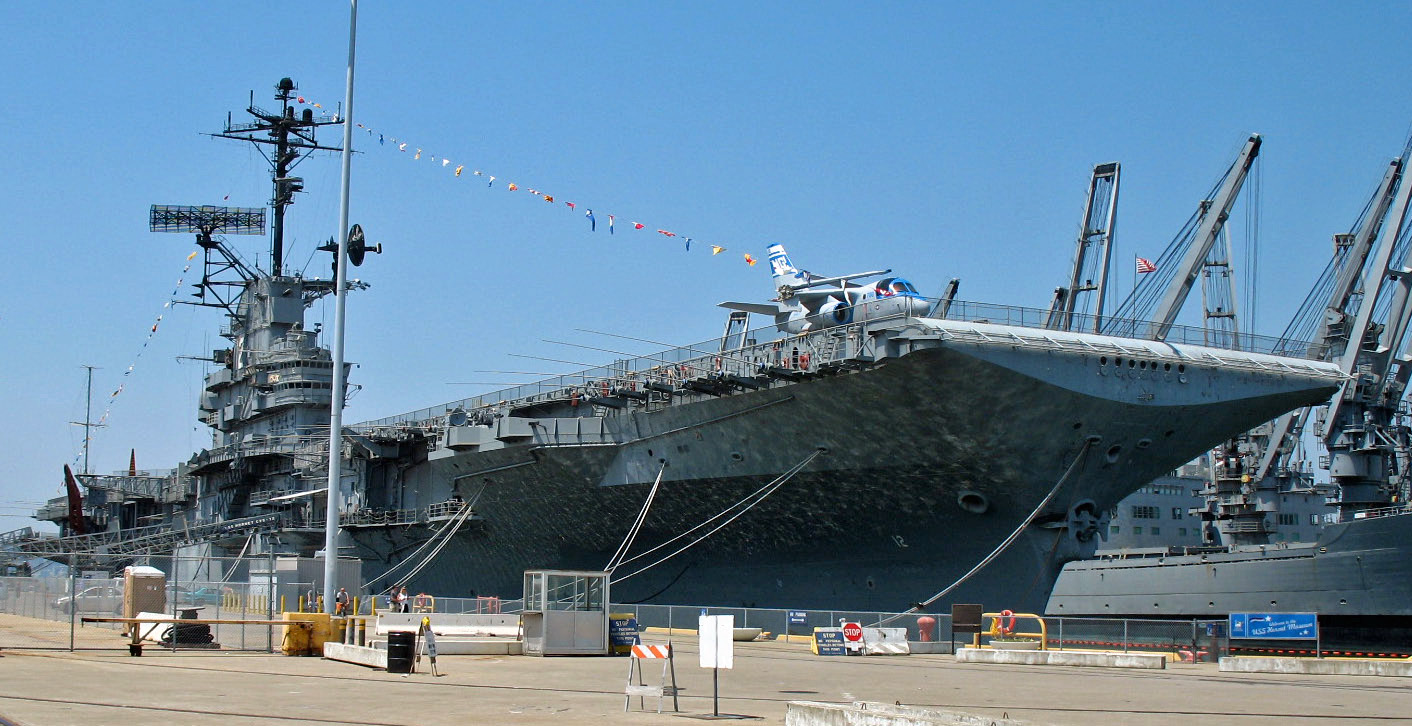
- Hornet docked in Alameda

- Location within California
- Established: 1998
- Location: Alameda, California
- Coordinates: 37°46′21.15″N 122°18′10.23″W
- Type: Aviation museum
- Website: www.uss-hornet.org
- USS Hornet (CVS-12)
- U.S. National Register of Historic Places
- U.S. National Historic Landmark
- Area: less than one acre
- Architect: Newport News Shipbuilding and Drydock
- NRHP reference No.: 91002065

The USS Hornet Sea, Air & Space Museum is a museum ship, located on the southernmost pier of the former Naval Air Station Alameda in Alameda, California. The museum is composed of the aircraft carrier USS Hornet, exhibits from the NASA Apollo Moon exploration missions, and several retired aircraft from the Second World War and the transonic and early supersonic jet propulsion period.

== History ==
Following its decommissioning in 1970, the USS Hornet was mothballed at the Puget Sound Naval Shipyard. In 1989, it was struck from the Naval Vessel Register in 1989 and the Navy started the process of disposing of the ship. The USS Hornet Historical Museum Foundation, based in Bremerton, Washington, was founded to prevent its scrapping. As a result, on 4 December 1991 it was designated a National Historic Landmark. Approximately four years later the Aircraft Carrier Hornet Foundation was established in California to try to save the ship. (Note: The articles of incorporation for the foundation were filed on 20 September 1995, but it was described as "newly formed" in a letter to the editor published on 30 June 1995.) As part of the effort, volunteers began cosmetic repairs and the foundation held a series of events that summer – including visits by the Laotian Royal Family and an open house at Fleet Week – to highlight the ship. On October 23rd, the ship was towed to Naval Supply Center, Oakland as the first step toward dismantling, but the Navy agreed to delay the process for 20 days. Then, in late November, following a legal injunction from the foundation, the Navy started the process of cancelling the contract with the scrapping company.

The ship was transferred to the USS Hornet Foundation on 26 May 1998 and the USS Hornet Museum officially opened to the public on 17 October 1998.

Despite reductions in the fee, by 2008 the museum was struggling to pay rent to the city of Alameda. The debt was finally paid off in March 2014.

The museum was due to open new exhibits about the history of ships named Hornet and shipboard morale, as well as an activity room for children, in September 2016.

The museum received a piece of wreckage from one of the B-25 aircraft involved in the Doolittle Raid in a trade with the Doolittle Raid Memorial Hall in Quzhou, Zhejiang in May 2025. In exchange, it provided an original 16 mm reel of film of the crews training to the hall.

The museum was forced to begin considering relocating to San Francisco by 2025 due to a lack of income. The problem was exacerbated by the inability to purchase an additional gangway to satisfy safety requirements. Later that year, an SBD-4 was returned to the ship from the March Field Air Museum for restoration.

== Exhibits ==
A number of compartments contain exhibits concerning contemporary carriers that are supported by related associations. The flight deck, hangar deck, and first deck below are open for self-guided tours. Docent-led tours are available into the ship's navigation and flight deck control areas of the island and down into one of the engineering spaces containing two of the four ship's propulsion turbines.

=== Apollo splashdown display ===
USS Hornet was selected in 1969 to serve as the Prime Recovery Ship (PRS) for the Apollo 11 Moon mission. Hornet led the recovery of the first astronauts to land on the Moon following their splashdown back on Earth. Four months later, Hornet recovered the all-Navy crew of Apollo 12. Artifacts on display include:

- Apollo Command Module CSM-011 used for the AS-202 uncrewed suborbital flight test
- Mobile Quarantine Facility (MQF) used by the Apollo 14 astronauts following their return to Earth
- SH-3H Sea King used in the 1995 movie Apollo 13
- Memorabilia and photos from the Apollo 11 and 12 splashdowns

== Collection ==
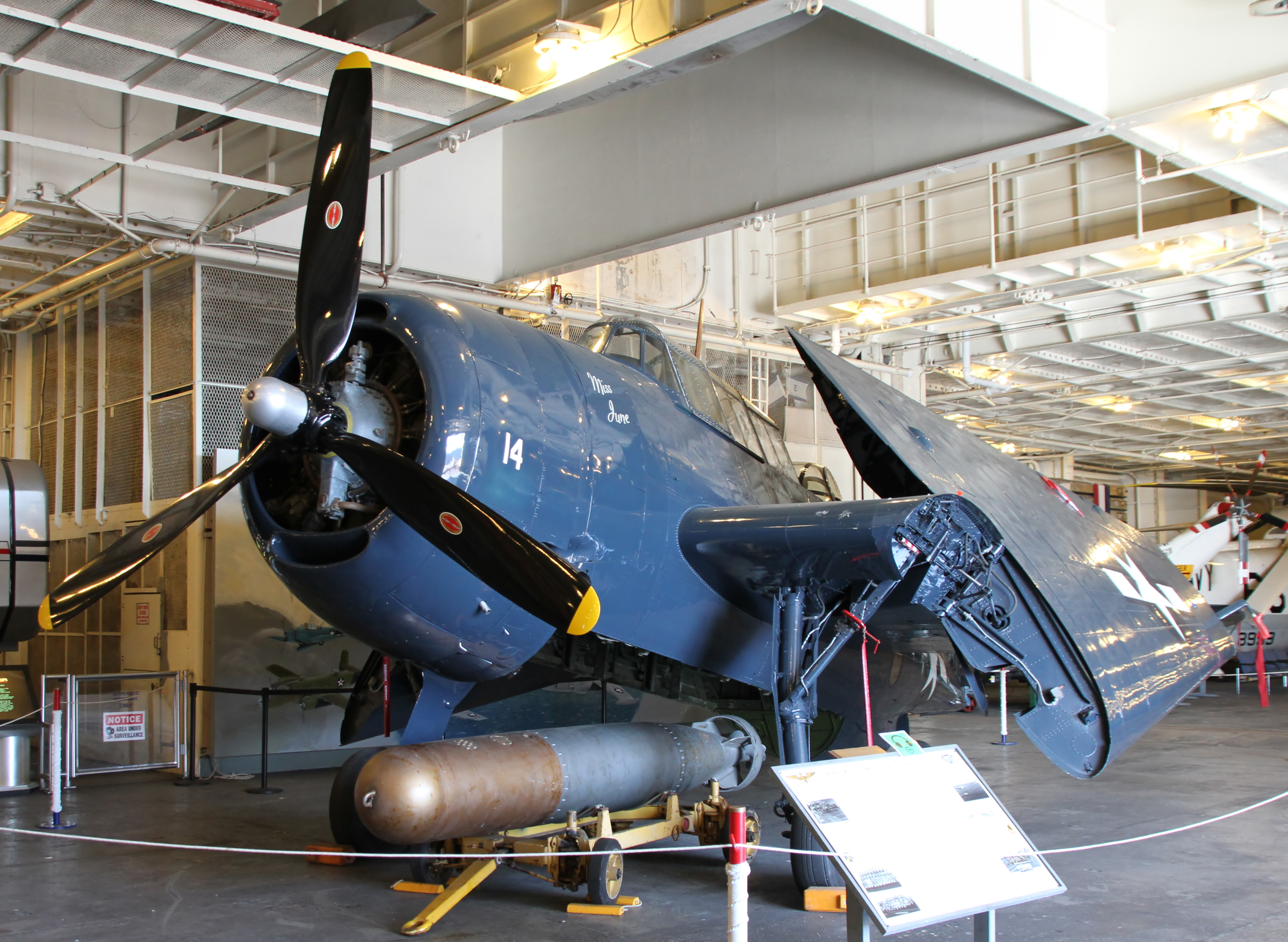
TBM Avenger on display with wings folded, and a torpedo

- Douglas SBD-4 Dauntless BuNo 10508
- Douglas TA-4J Skyhawk BuNo 158137
- General Motors FM-2 Wildcat BuNo 55052
- General Motors TBM-3E Avenger BuNo 85560
- Grumman F-11A Tiger BuNo 141821 – forward fuselage
- Grumman F-14A Tomcat BuNo 162689
- Grumman US-2B Tracker BuNo 136691
- Kaman SH-2 Seasprite BuNo 149021
- Lockheed S-3B Viking BuNo 160599
- McDonnell Douglas F/A-18C Hornet BuNo 163502
- McDonnell Douglas F-4S Phantom II BuNo 153879
- North American FJ-2 Fury BuNo 132057
- North American T-28B Trojan BuNo 529263
- Piasecki HUP-1 Retriever
- Sikorsky SH-3H Sea King BuNo 148999
- Sikorsky UH-34D Seahorse BuNo 150553
- Vought DF-8F Crusader BuNo 143703
- Vought F-8K Crusader – forward fuselage

== Events ==
In 2023 and 2024, the museum hosted a rave called "Rattleship". In 2026, it held a haunted house called "Haunted Hornet".

=== CarrierCon ===
Hornet also hosts CarrierCon, a fan convention for anime, video game, comic and cosplay fans. In 2023, CarrierCon collaborated with Azur Lane, a mobile game that features anthropomorphic "shipgirls" including Hornet herself (as Hornet II to distinguish her from her Yorktown-class version), as well as featuring a separate shipgirl called "Hornet-Chan" as the mascot of the event. Later that year, Hornet was chosen to host Azur Lane's live event celebrating the 5th anniversary of its English/worldwide release. In 2025, the con hosted a variety of VTubers, many from VFleet Project, which provided an in-person virtual concert to attendees.

== See also ==
- Alameda Naval Air Museum
- List of aircraft carriers of the United States Navy
- List of maritime museums in the United States
- Pacific Reserve Fleet, Alameda
- U.S. Navy museums (and other aircraft-carrier museums)
- USS Hornet (CV-8)
