= Fokker T.IX =

Dutch twin-engine bomber

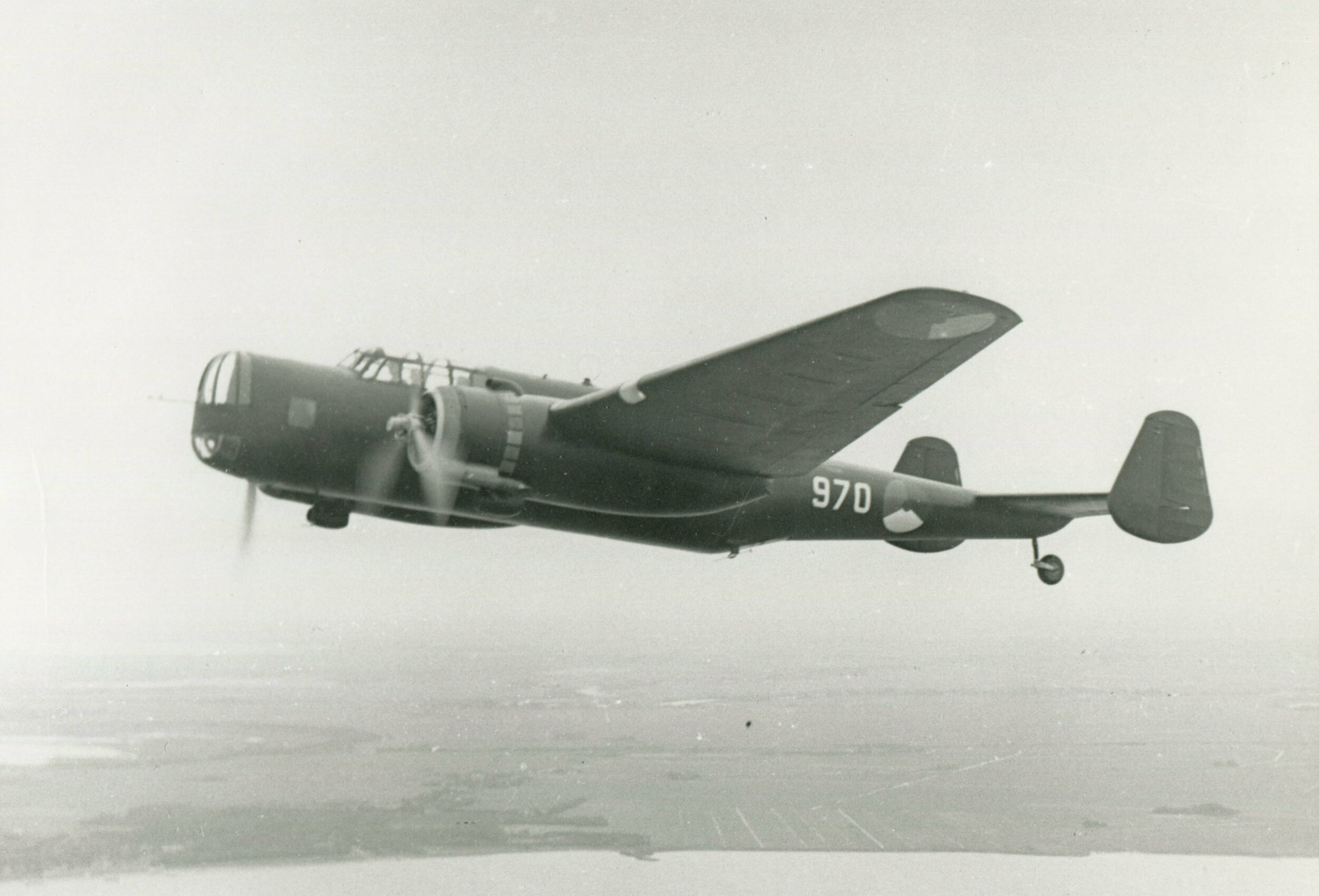

General information
- Type: Twin-engined bomber
- National origin: Netherlands
- Manufacturer: Fokker
- Status: Abandoned
- Number built: 1

History
- First flight: 11 September 1939

The Fokker T.IX was a Dutch twin-engined bomber designed and built by Fokker for the Royal Netherlands East Indies Army Air Force as a replacement for their obsolescent Martin-built bombers.

== Development ==
Design of the T.IX was started in 1938 as the company's first all-metal bomber project. It was a mid-wing monoplane with twin fins and rudders and retractable landing gear, powered by two 1375 hp (1025 kW) Bristol Hercules radial piston engines. The T.IX first flew on 11 September 1939, but in April 1940 during testing it was damaged when it collided with a hangar door. The subsequent German invasion of the Netherlands stopped repair and further development.

== Specifications ==
Data from

General characteristics

- Length: 16.50 m (54 ft 2 in)
- Wingspan: 24.70 m (81 ft 0 in)
- Height: 5.10 m (16 ft 9 in)
- Empty weight: 6,500 kg (14,330 lb) equipped
- Max takeoff weight: 11,200 kg (24,692 lb)
- Powerplant: 2 × Bristol Hercules 14-cylinder radial piston engine, 1,025 kW (1,375 hp) each

Performance

- Maximum speed: 440 km/h (270 mph, 240 kn)
- Range: 2,720 km (1,690 mi, 1,470 nmi)
- Service ceiling: 8,000 m (26,000 ft)

Armament

- Guns: intended - 1 × 20 mm cannon in nose, 2 × 12.7 mm (0.5in) machine guns in dorsal and ventral positions.
- Bombs: up to 2,000kg (4,409 lb) in internal bomb bay
