= Short Solent =

Passenger flying boat

S.45A Solent
- The Aquila Airways Solent III, G-AKNU Sydney, taking-off from Funchal

General information
- Type: passenger flying boat
- Manufacturer: Short Brothers and Harland
- Primary users: BOAC TEAL
- Number built: 16 (and 7 converted S.45 Seafords)

History
- First flight: 11 November 1946
- Developed from: Short Seaford

The Short Solent is a passenger flying boat that was produced by Short Brothers in the late 1940s. It was developed from the Short Seaford, itself a development of the Short Sunderland military flying boat design.

The first Solent flew in 1946. New Solents were used by BOAC and TEAL, production ending in 1949. Second-hand aircraft were operated until 1958 by a number of small airlines such as Aquila Airways.

== Design and development ==
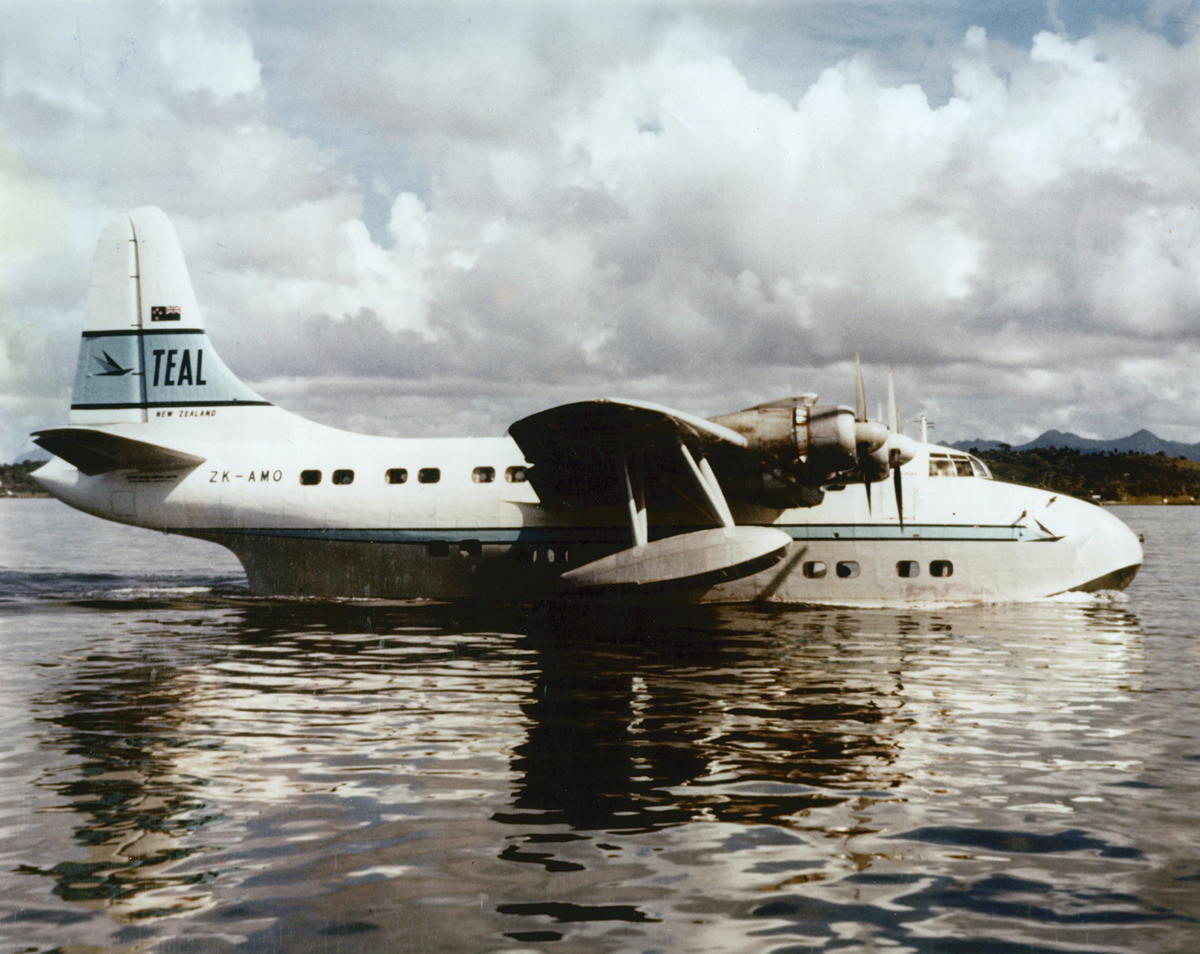
Solent IV TEAL ZK-AMO Aranui

The Short S.45 Solent was a high-wing monoplane flying boat of aluminium construction. Power was provided by four Bristol Hercules engines.

The aircraft could be fitted for 24 passengers with day and night accommodation or 36 day passengers. The cabins (four on the lower deck and two on the upper) could be used to sleep four or seat six. The upper deck included a lounge/dining area next to a kitchen; the lower deck had two dressing rooms, toilets and three freight compartments. The flight crew was five (two pilots, navigator, and radio operator with the flight engineer in a separate compartment behind the flight deck opposite crew rest berths) and there were two stewards to attend to the passengers.

== Operational history ==
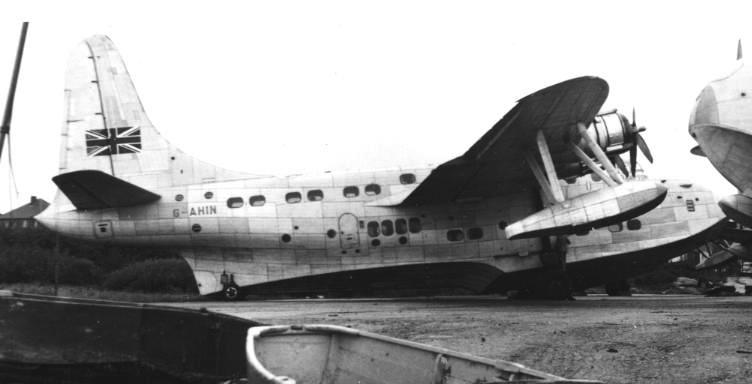
Solent II BOAC G-AHIN Southampton served the Johannesburg route between 1948 and 1950

The Solent II introduced by BOAC could carry 34 passengers and 7 crew. Between 1948 and 1950, BOAC operated their Solents on the three-times weekly scheduled service from Southampton to Johannesburg taking a route down the Nile and across East Africa. The journey took four days, including overnight stops. The Solents replaced Avro Yorks running the service. The last Solent-operated service on the route departed from Berth 50 at Southampton on 10 November 1950, bringing BOAC's flying-boat operations to an end.

Tasman Empire Airways Limited (TEAL) operated four Solent IVs and one Solent II between 1949 and 1960 on their scheduled routes between Sydney, Fiji, Auckland and Wellington. The last TEAL Solent service was flown between Fiji and Tahiti on 14 September 1960 by ZK-AMO, RMA Aranui, which is now preserved. The TEAL Solents could carry 45 passengers and all versions of the type provided a great deal of space and luxury compared with contemporary or modern land-based aircraft.

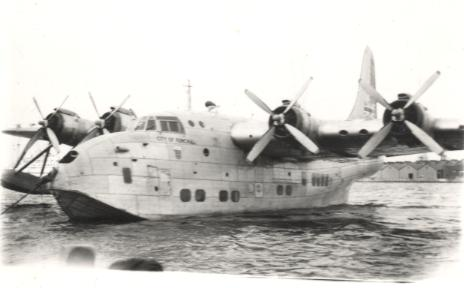
Solent III Aquila Airways G-ANAJ City of Funchal at Berth 50, Southampton Docks, in August 1955

Several Solents served Aquila Airways on their routes from Southampton to Madeira and the Canary Islands using ex BOAC and TEAL aircraft. On 15 November 1957, Aquila Airways G-AKNU, a Solent III, crashed near Chessell, Isle of Wight, after it experienced loss of power to two engines. The crash killed 45 out of the 58 on board. British commercial flying-boat operations ceased on 30 September 1958 when Aquila Airways withdrew its Madeira service.

== Variants ==
- Solent II

Civilian version for BOAC of the Short Seaford, 12 aircraft built at Rochester

- Solent III

Converted S.45 Seaford. 7 aircraft – 6 at Queen's Island, Belfast, 1 at Hamble

- Solent IV

Powered by Bristol Hercules 733, four aircraft built at Belfast

== Operators ==
Australia

- Trans Oceanic Airways

New Zealand

- Tasman Empire Airways Limited (TEAL)

United Kingdom

- Aquila Airways
- British Overseas Airways Corporation (BOAC)

United States

- South Pacific Air Lines

The only military use of the Solent was for trials at the United Kingdom Marine Aircraft Experimental Establishment in 1951, the former BOAC Solent 3 was scrapped after the trials.

== Accidents and incidents ==
15 November 1957 – Aquila Airways Solent G-AKNU crashed on the Isle of Wight. The aircraft took off at around 10:40 pm from Southampton Water for Lisbon, Madeira and Las Palmas. Around 20 minutes later, the crew reported the failure of number 4 engine and turned back. Soon after, number 3 engine also stopped and around one minute after the radio report, the aircraft crashed into a chalk quarry near Chessell, killing 45 of the 58 people on board. No cause for either engine failure was established in the subsequent investigation.

A memorial to those killed is in St Mary's Church, Brook. A tree and a plaque mark the crash-site.

== Surviving aircraft ==
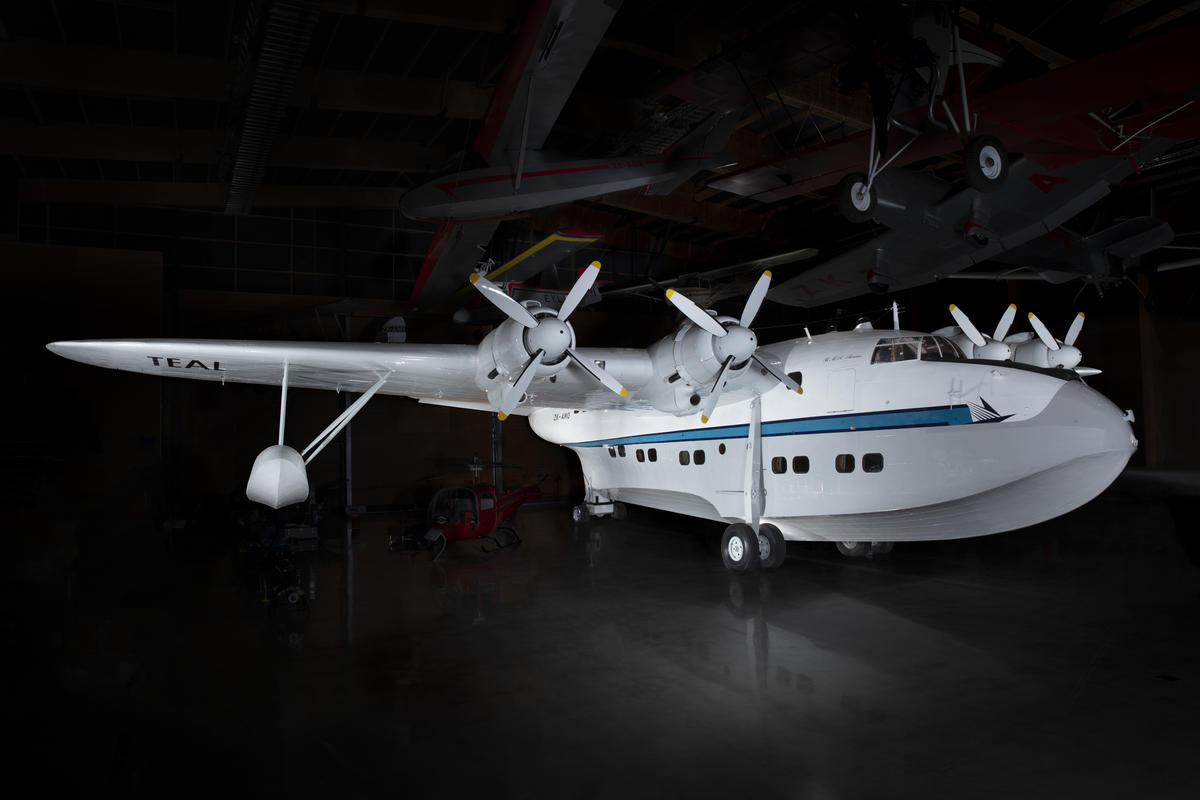
Solent IV TEAL ZK-AMO Aranui on display

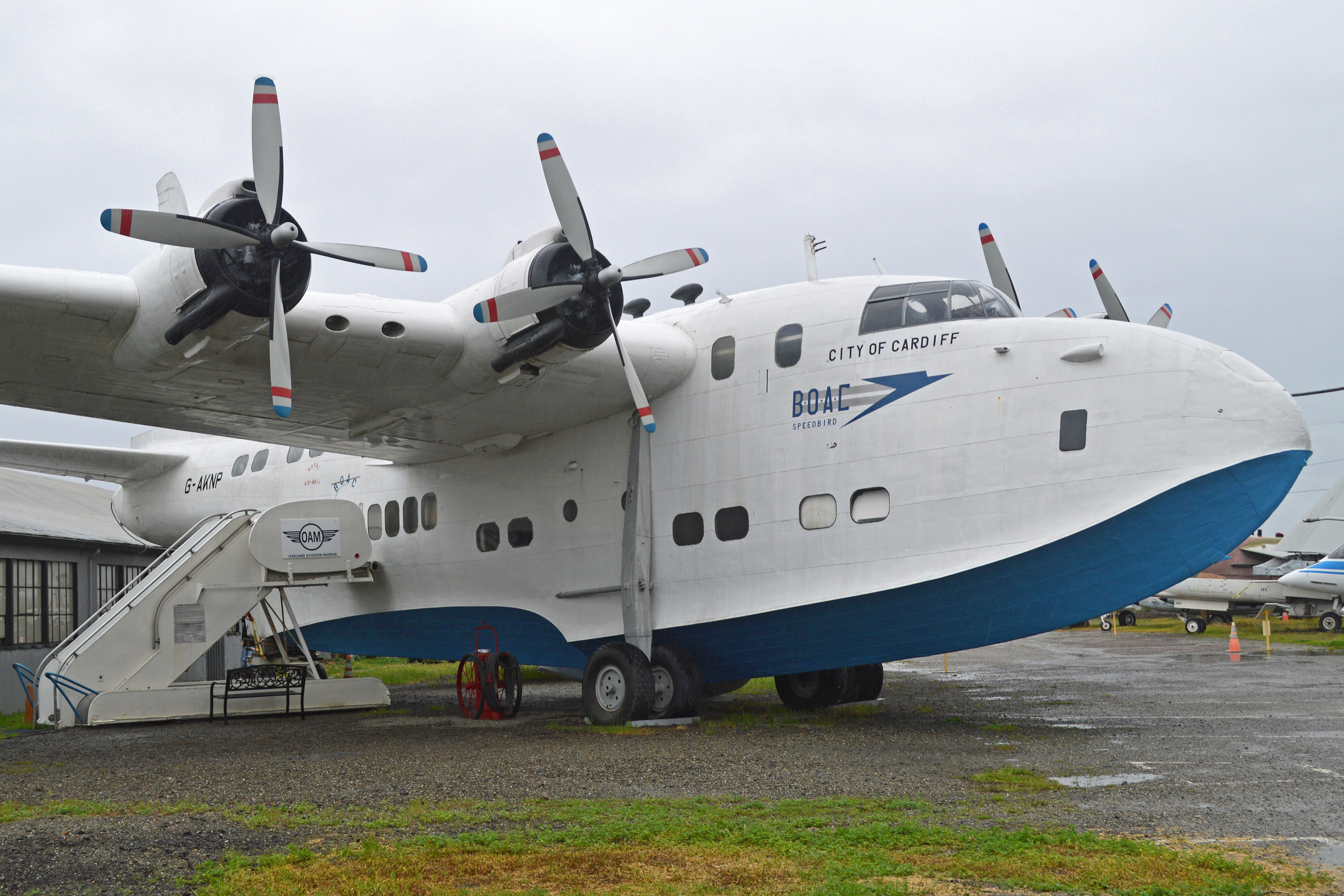
Solent III BOAC G-AKNP City of Cardiff on display

- Short Solent IV ZK-AMO, RMA Aranui, was firstly used by TEAL between Mechanics Bay on Auckland Harbour and Rose Bay Sydney, Australia until superseded on scheduled services by the land based propliners. ZK-AMO was redeployed on the iconic Coral Route from Auckland New Zealand to Fiji, Samoa, Cook Islands, Tonga and Tahiti, until once again superseded by propliners in September 1960. ZK-AMO has been fully restored and preserved at the Museum of Transport and Technology in Auckland. It was briefly overhauled outside when the Keith Park Memorial Aviation Display at MOTAT was enlarged in 2010–2011.
- An ex-BOAC Solent III, later owned by Howard Hughes, has been rescued and is in the United States at the Oakland Aviation Museum in Oakland, California.; it is this Solent which appears briefly (and anachronistically) in the film Raiders of the Lost Ark, though through matte effects is made to resemble a more historically accurate Boeing 314 Clipper.

== Specifications (Solent II) ==
Data from Barnes and James

General characteristics

- Crew: 7
- Capacity: 34 passengers
- Length: 87 ft 8 in (26.72 m)
- Wingspan: 112 ft 9 in (34.37 m)
- Height: 34 ft 3 1/4 in (10.446 m)
- Wing area: 1,487 sq ft (138.1 m^{2})
- Empty weight: 47,760 lb (21,664 kg)
- Gross weight: 78,000 lb (35,380 kg)
- Powerplant: 4 × Bristol Hercules 637 14-cylinder radial engines, 1,690 hp (1,260 kW) each

Performance

- Maximum speed: 273 mph (439 km/h, 237 kn)
- Cruise speed: 244 mph (393 km/h, 212 kn)
- Range: 1,800 mi (2,900 km, 1,600 nmi)
- Service ceiling: 17,000 ft (5,200 m)
- Rate of climb: 925 ft/min (4.70 m/s)

== Bibliography ==
- Barnes, C.H.; James D.N. (1989). Shorts Aircraft since 1900. London: Putnam. ISBN 0-85177-819-4.
- Jackson, A.J (1988). British Civil Aircraft since 1919 Volume 3. London: Putnam. ISBN 0-85177-818-6.
- Warner, Guy (July–August 2002). "From Bombay to Bombardier: Aircraft Production at Sydenham, Part One". Air Enthusiast. No. 100. pp. 13–24. ISSN 0143-5450.
