= Mitcham Road Cemetery =

Cemetery in London, England

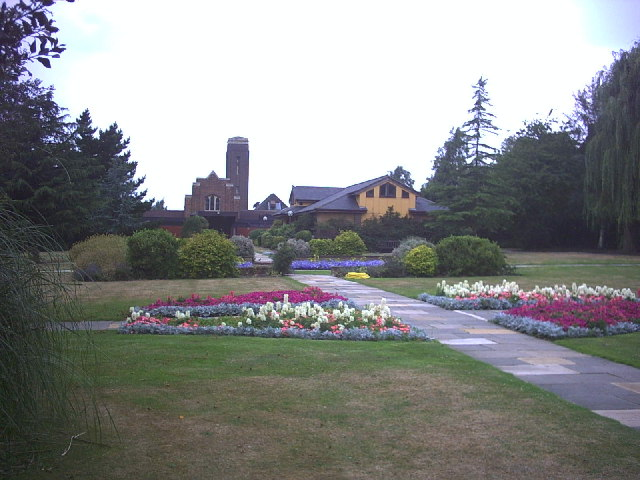
- Croydon Crematorium in Mitcham Road Cemetery
- Interactive map of Mitcham Road Cemetery

Details
- Established: 1897
- Location: Mitcham Road, Croydon, CR9 3AT
- Country: England
- Coordinates: 51.3912°N 0.1254°W
- Type: Public
- Owned by: Croydon Cemeteries and Crematoriums
- Size: 17 hectares (42 acres)
- Website: Croydon Council website

Mitcham Road Cemetery, previously called Croydon Cemetery, is a cemetery located next to Mitcham Common near Croydon, which is part of the London Borough of Croydon, London. Croydon Crematorium is located inside the cemetery, and are both managed by Croydon Cemeteries and Crematoriums. The cemetery is much larger than other ones in London. There is also a chapel located inside the cemetery.

== History ==
The cemetery was opened in 1897, and extended twice, in 1935 and again in 1937. A tree-lined drive leads to a modern chapel and crematorium block with paved landscaping, which gradually gives way to the Victorian original, with its own chapel and a number of angels. The crematorium was built in 1937, and extended in 1962.

== Notable burials and cremations ==
- Derek Bentley (1933–1953), controversially hanged in 1953 (remains moved from Wandsworth Prison in 1966). His family successfully fought for "A Victim of British Justice" to be inscribed on his gravestone
- Ronnie Corbett (1930–2016), comedian (cremated)
- Frederick George Creed (1871–1957), inventor of the teleprinter
- Sir Charles Flynn, Deputy Chairman of HM Customs and Excise 1936–1938
- William Hurlstone (1876–1906), composer
- Sally Anne Bowman (1987–2005), murdered model
- Meredith Kercher (1985–2007), murdered student
- Tom Norman (1860–1930), businessman and showman, manager of Joseph Merrick, the "Elephant Man"
- Sandra Rivett (1945–1974), children's nanny, murder victim (according to inquest) of her employer's estranged husband Lord Lucan, was cremated here in 1974.

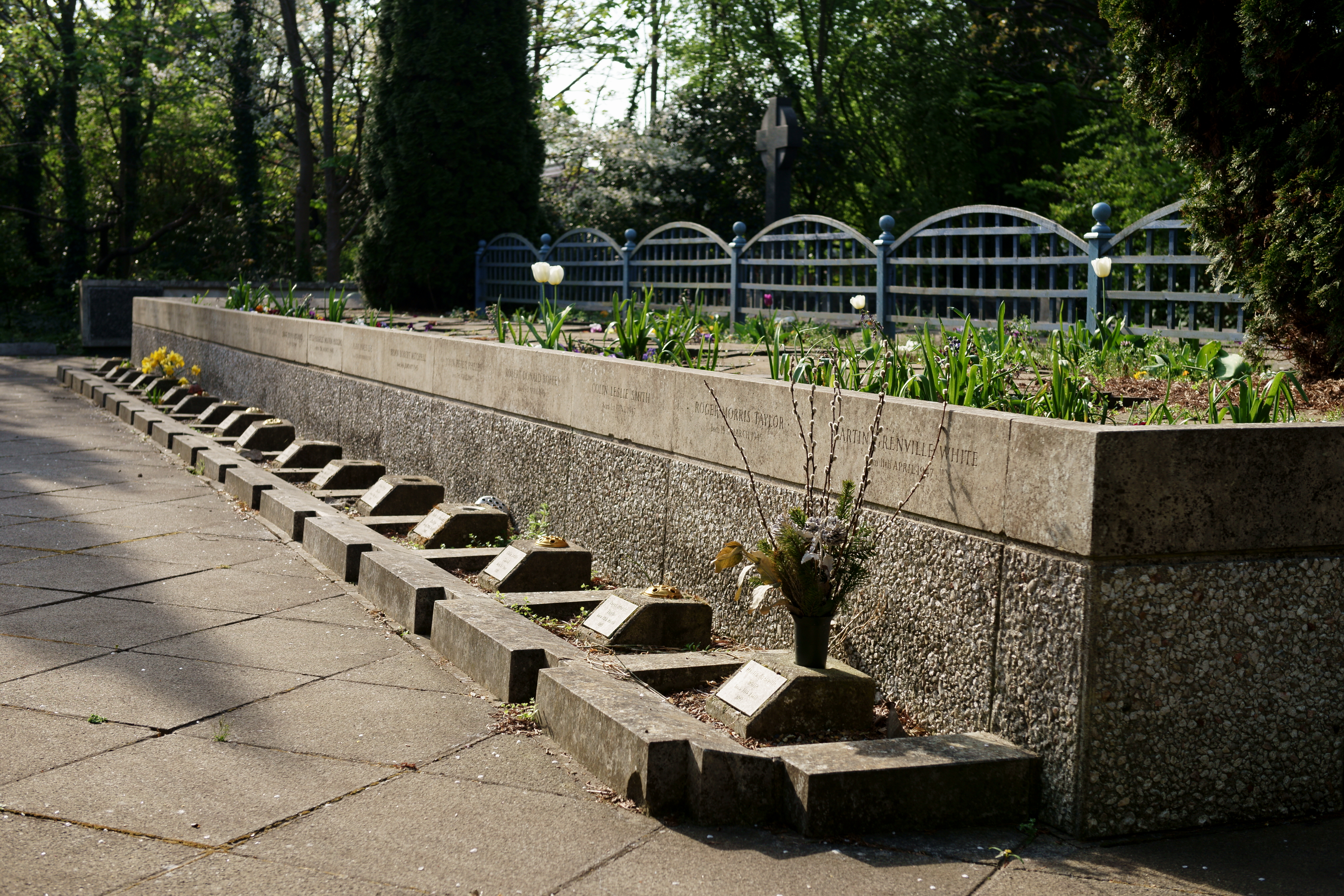
Communal grave of victims of the Stavanger air crash, 1961

The cemetery has a memorial to 34 boys and 2 masters from The Archbishop Lanfranc School, who were killed in an aircraft crash near Stavanger Airport, Sola, in 1961. It adjoins a communal grave in which 33 of the boys and one master are buried.

Also cremated here were the remains of nearly 6,000 psychiatric inmates of Cane Hill Hospital, who were exhumed from the hospital's deconsecrated cemetery on Portnail Road in 1981 as part of the redevelopment of its site.

== War graves ==
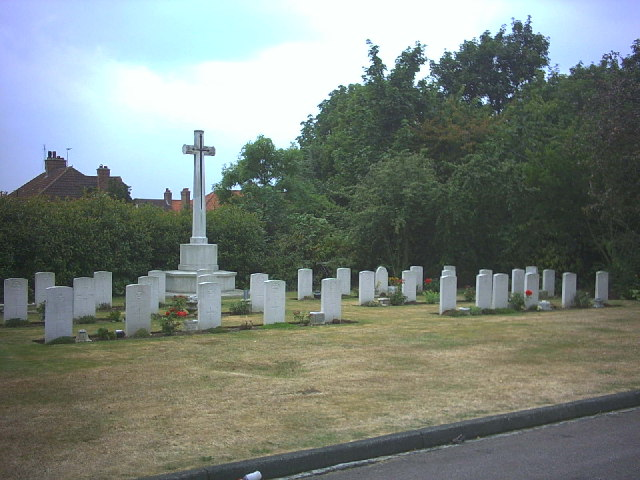
Cross of Sacrifice and World War II military graves

The cemetery contains the graves of 195 Commonwealth service personnel of the First World War, scattered throughout the cemetery, and 150 from the Second World War. Some of the Second World War-era graves form a war graves plot on Thornton Heath extension (Plot P.P.), which contains special memorials to two casualties whose graves could not be located.

A Portland stone memorial, erected by the Commonwealth War Graves Commission, which faces the Garden of Rest at Croydon Crematorium, commemorates 59 Commonwealth service personnel of the Second World War who were cremated there. In 2015 a further memorial, next door to the war graves plot, was erected to commemorate 18 discharged British soldiers of the First World War who died at the Cane Hill Hospital and were originally buried there until its site was redeveloped, following which their remains were exhumed and cremated here, their ashes scattered in 'Location 1000' in the grounds. In all 77 Commonwealth service personnel are commemorated at the Crematorium.

== Transport links ==
The cemetery is located on the west edge of the Croydon borough and is not well connected by public transport, although inside the cemetery there is an extensive network of roads suitable for cars. London Buses route 264 stops outside the cemetery.

Therapia Lane tram stop is a five-minute walk away from the cemetery and is on Tramlink which serves Wimbledon, Croydon and New Addington. The nearest mainline railway station is Thornton Heath station which is on the Brighton Main Line to London Victoria or London Bridge.

== See also ==
- Queen's Road Cemetery, an earlier cemetery in the London Borough of Croydon
