= British Eagle =

British airline from 1948 - 1968

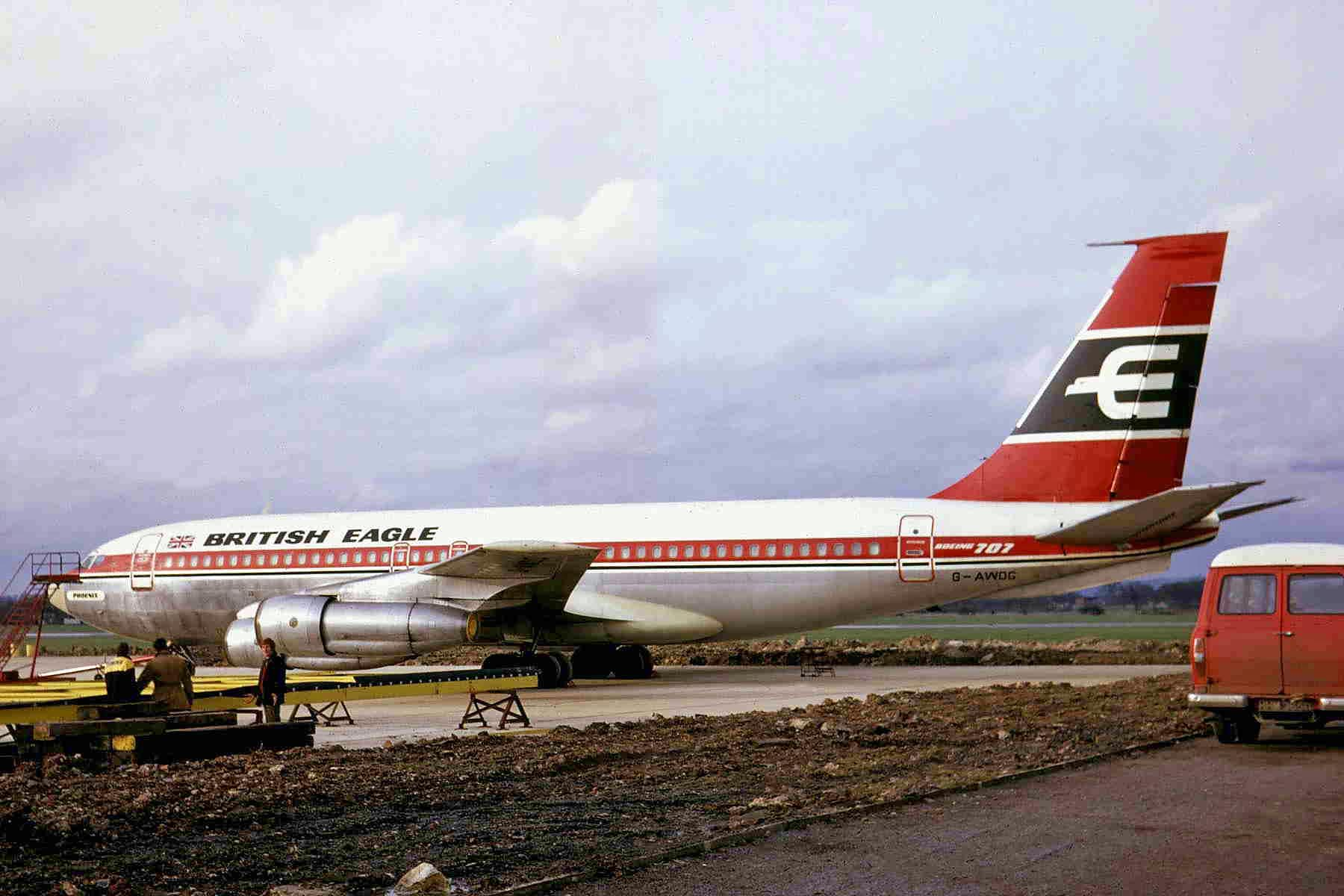
- Boeing 707
IATA	ICAO	Call sign
EG	—	EAGLE
- Founded: 1948
- Ceased operations: 1968
- Hubs: RAF Aldermaston (1948–1950), Luton Airport (1950–1952), Blackbushe Airport (1952–1960), Heathrow Airport (1960–1968)
- Fleet size: 24 aircraft (8 jets: 1 Boeing 707-365C, 2 Boeing 707-138B, 5 BAC One-Eleven 300; 16 turboprops: 12 Bristol 175 Britannia 300s, 4 Vickers Viscount 700s) as of April 1968
- Destinations: non-scheduled: worldwide scheduled: United Kingdom (1963–1968); Europe (1953–1968); Bermuda (1958–1962); Bahamas (1958–1962); United States (1962); Western Hemisphere (interregional) (1958–1962)
- Parent company: Eagle Aviation Ltd (1948–1963); British Eagle International Airlines Ltd (1963–1966); Eagle International Airlines Ltd (1966–1968)
- Headquarters: Central London (1948–1962); Heathrow Airport (1963–1965); Central London (1966–1968)

British Eagle International Airlines was a major British independent (Note: independent from government-owned corporations) airline that operated from 1948 until it went into liquidation in 1968. It operated scheduled and charter services on a domestic, international and transatlantic basis over the years.

== History ==
=== Formation and early operations ===
Harold Bamberg, a former wartime pilot, formed the airline on 14 April 1948 with a nominal capital of £100 as Eagle Aviation Ltd. at Aldermaston. The initial fleet comprised two wartime bombers converted for carrying fruit and vegetables. The first aircraft to enter service was a converted Halifax Mk 8 with the civil registration G-AJBL. It operated Eagle's first commercial flight on 9 May, carrying a cargo of cherries from Verona to Bovingdon. It subsequently transported fruit from Italy and Spain for the Covent Garden merchants. It was joined by a second Halifax, registered G-ALEF and christened Red Eagle. Both aircraft saw extensive service along with a further two others during the Berlin Airlift.

The airline acquired Air Freight Ltd. during the summer of 1948 with three more Halifaxes later the same year. Eagle acquired three Avro York aircraft in late 1949, followed by eight others, and used these until early 1955 for both passenger and freight charters. Eagle aviation moved to Luton in 1950. For most of its existence, the company's head office was located at 29 Clarges Street, Central London.

By 1951, Eagle Aviation had won its first regular Government trooping contracts, including the first regular contract awarded by the War Office for trooping flights between the UK and Singapore starting in August 1951. This helped keep its fleet of six Halifaxes and nine Avro Yorks busy and provided employment for 100 people including 12 pilots. Operations moved to Blackbushe Airport in 1952, followed a year later by the launch of secondary scheduled services in association with British European Airways (BEA), from whom Eagle had purchased a large fleet of Vickers Vikings. Trent Valley Aviation Ltd., which had been bought in September 1950, was fully absorbed one year later.

=== Start of scheduled operations ===
During 1953, Eagle Aviation's steadily growing passenger charter operations included for the first time aerial cruises around the Mediterranean. Following Eagle's decision to sell the Yorks to rival UK independent Skyways for £160,000, the airline expanded from charter work into scheduled services on 6 June from its new base at Blackbushe Airport, using Vickers Vikings. The first of these were acquired from Crewsair, another rival UK independent. Eagle, which in July set up Eagle Airways Ltd. as a new company to run the scheduled side of the business (leaving Eagle Aviation in charge of all non-scheduled operations, including trooping flights), inaugurated its first scheduled service on 6 June 1953 from London (Blackbushe) to Belgrade (via Munich), followed by London—Aalborg and London—Gothenburg. It also began operating domestic flights within the UK and additional international services to secondary western European destinations. Eagle's expansion was supported by 22 Vickers Vikings that had been retained from an earlier purchase of 37 former BEA examples.

=== Entry into package holiday market ===
In 1954, the Ministry of Aviation granted Eagle permission to operate a limited programme of a new type of low-fare service that combined air travel and overseas holiday accommodation at a cost substantially below the aggregate of each individual component if purchased separately. This new concept enabled the airline to circumvent regulatory restrictions that prevented private airlines from competing with their state-owned counterparts. It also helped increase fleet utilisation.

When the Thomas Cook & Son travel agency declined Eagle's offer to take on the role of the airline's tour operator, Eagle acquired the Sir Henry Lunn Ltd travel agency chain. This made the airline one of the pioneers of the British package holiday industry and probably marked the first occasion in the UK an airline became vertically integrated with its own in-house tour operator (i.e. where an airline owns or is owned by a tour operator or both are part of an integrated travel group) British Eagle also acquired the Polytechnic Touring Association in the 1950s and formed Lunn Poly from the two agencies in the mid-1960s.

Eagle's first inclusive tour (IT) flights operated to destinations in Italy and Spain (including Mallorca). To make its packages more affordable and increase sales, Lunn began offering hire purchase facilities. Between 1955 and 1960, many of the airline's aircraft carried the Eagle Airways operating name.

By 1957, the summer IT programme included for the first time 15-day, all-inclusive packages to Spain's Costa Brava. These combined flights to Perpignan in Southern France with onward coach connections, with prices starting from £32.50 for travel on Mondays (£36 for weekend travel). 1957 was also the year Eagle joined IATA.

=== Branching out ===
On 26 July 1957, Eagle formed an overseas subsidiary, named Eagle Airways (Bermuda) Ltd., in preparation for the launch of transatlantic scheduled services between Bermuda and New York, using Viscount 800 turboprop aircraft. Within a year of launching its first transatlantic scheduled route, the airline's North Atlantic scheduled operation extended to Montreal, Baltimore, Washington, D.C., and Nassau from June 1958.

=== Acquisition of first imported aircraft ===
In 1958, Eagle acquired the first three of an eventual six Douglas DC-6s for long-range charter and scheduled operations. These were the airline's first pressurised aircraft. They were also its first imported aircraft (the initial batch of three had been sourced from the US). This acquisition marked an important change regarding UK airlines' aircraft procurement policies as new legislation permitted (for the first time) that aircraft imported from abroad – usually American models – could be paid for in dollars. The lack of access to foreign exchange to finance overseas aircraft purchases prior to the change in legislation had compelled all private UK airlines to equip their fleets either with British-built civilian/ex-military aircraft or war-surplus, or foreign-built military transport planes that had served with the RAF Transport Command — mainly Douglas Dakotas. Their state-owned counterparts had to seek Government dispensation to import foreign aircraft, which was only granted when no suitable British alternatives were available. These measures had been designed during the early post-war years to conserve as much of Britain's scarce US dollar-denominated foreign exchange reserves as possible.

=== Pioneering of low-fare scheduled services in the Western Hemisphere ===
Eagle Airways (Bermuda) launched commercial operations in June 1958 between Bermuda and New York, competing head-on with three of the world's most powerful airlines – BOAC, Pan Am and Eastern Air Lines. Other regional services in the Western Hemisphere followed. Stimulated by low fares, traffic volumes on the Nassau—Miami and Bermuda—JFK sectors grew such that it was possible to run a four-times-a-day Viscount shuttle on the former and a similar, thrice-daily operation on the latter profitably. This increased Eagle's, as well as the overall British market share on these routes. This success provided the impetus for Eagle Airways (Bermuda) to launch weekly low-fare through-plane scheduled services to London with all-coach-configured DC-6Cs. The use of a foreign-registered aircraft on the London route enabled it to circumvent restrictive licensing provisions (including those contained in the forthcoming Civil Aviation (Licensing) Act 1960 (8 & 9 Eliz. 2. c. 38)) as it only applied to UK aircraft. Bermuda's status as a British colony furthermore meant that no reciprocal approvals from overseas authorities were needed. Eagle's new direct Bermuda—London flights were a cheaper and faster alternative to BOAC's DC-7C services which routed via New York. However, the terms of the licence permitting Eagle to operate scheduled services on this route required it to share its revenues with BOAC.

In November 1958, Eagle applied to the Air Transport Advisory Council (ATAC), the contemporary UK Government department in charge of air transport economic regulation, for permission to offer low fares on existing and planned scheduled routes to Cyprus, Gibraltar, Malta, Singapore, the Bahamas, the Caribbean as well as East and West Africa. For instance, Eagle's £19 proposed fare to Malta compared with BEA's £52.60 and its £199 Singapore fare compared with a £351 fare charged by BOAC. This marked the first occasion on which a private British airline sought approval to offer scheduled fares that undercut the equivalent published fares of the state-owned airlines by a substantial margin. Eagle's low fares were designed to increase the British market share on routes the state airlines had monopolised by stimulating demand. The airline argued that the British economy as a whole would benefit if it was granted permission to offer these fares, as a consequence of additional foreign exchange earnings accruing to the UK Exchequer that resulted from boosting Britain's share of total traffic. Loss-making BEA and BOAC lodged objections with ATAC against Eagle's low-fare proposals, which were upheld. By the spring of 1959, Eagle Airways (Bermuda) was operating scheduled passenger flights with Vickers Viscount 805 turboprop aircraft between Bermuda and Baltimore, Washington, D.C. and New York City in the U.S. as well as between Bermuda and Montreal in Canada.

=== Breaking even on scheduled operations ===
Following six years of losses, Eagle managed to break even on what it claimed to be Britain's biggest network of independent-operated scheduled services comprising 12 routes to Europe by 1959. By the late 1950s, all aircraft carried the Eagle Airways name.

=== The early 1960s (1960–1963) ===
Following Blackbushe's closure to commercial air traffic in 1960, Eagle moved its base to London Heathrow, then simply known as London Airport.

Eagle along with British United Airways (BUA) — its principal contemporary independent competitor – had successfully lobbied the Government to bring about a change in legislation that had given their state-owned counterparts a virtual monopoly on scheduled services. This resulted in the Civil Aviation (Licensing) Act of 1960, which abolished BEA's and BOAC's statutory monopoly on principal domestic and international scheduled routes and – theoretically – gave the independents equal opportunities to develop such routes in their own right. Eagle concurred with BUA and Caledonian Airways — an independent upstart that would subsequently compete with it head-to-head for a licence to operate transatlantic scheduled services — that running a fully fledged scheduled operation was the only way to build an airline with a long-term, stable future. It argued that the non-scheduled nature of its business – mainly trooping, ad hoc charters and IT flying – made planning ahead difficult because of extreme seasonality and generally low margins. Therefore, Eagle saw its future primarily as an international scheduled passenger and freight carrier with transatlantic ambitions.

=== The Cunard era ===
==== Cunard Eagle Airways ====
In March 1960, Cunard bought a 60% controlling stake for £30 million, resulting in renaming the air carrier to Cunard Eagle Airways. The capital injection enabled Cunard Eagle to become the first British independent airline to operate pure jet airliners, as a result of a £6 million order for two new Boeing 707-420 passenger aircraft in May 1961. The order had been placed (including an option on a third aircraft) in expectation of being granted traffic rights for transatlantic scheduled services. The airline took delivery of its first Bristol Britannia aircraft on 5 April 1960 (on lease from Cubana). Cunard Eagle was also the first independent airline in the UK to be awarded a license by the newly constituted Air Transport Licensing Board (ATLB) to operate a scheduled service on the prime Heathrow – New York JFK route. This license was valid for 15 years – from 31 August 1961 to 31 July 1976. Cunard appointed Eagle's original founder, Harold Bamberg, as their new aviation director, hoping that his knowledge of the industry would help them to capture a significant share of the 1 million people that crossed the Atlantic by air in 1960. This was the first time more passengers chose to make their transatlantic crossing by air than sea. The Bermuda-based operations became Cunard-Eagle Airways (Bermuda) Ltd.

The airline also won the right to serve Manchester, Glasgow Prestwick, Philadelphia, Baltimore, Boston and Washington, D.C.. However, the carriage of passengers on UK domestic sectors and of mail on all sectors was denied, as well as requests for traffic rights to Toronto, Montreal, Detroit and Chicago. The decision to open these transatlantic routes to Cunard Eagle angered BOAC, which was losing money at the time. It appealed to Aviation Minister Peter Thorneycroft, who was empowered to accept or reject the ATLB's recommendations and to uphold or quash appeals against its decisions. The state airline cited its order for 45 Standard and Super VC10 long-haul jets and an earlier ministerial promise not to permit another British competitor on this route in support of its appeal. The appeal was upheld, resulting in revocation of Cunard Eagle's transatlantic licenses in November 1961. In the meantime the airline acquired two further Britannia aircraft in March and May 1961, both ex-Canadian Pacific Air Lines aircraft.

In April 1960, the Government approved a range of new Colonial Coach fares for travel by British residents only on cabotage routes linking the UK with its remaining colonies. Despite opposition from IATA, British airlines – including British IATA members – were free to introduce them from 1 October 1960 as UK authorities controlled fares at both ends. Apart from Eagle, the beneficiaries included BEA, BOAC, BUA and Skyways.

From 1 October 1960, all-coach DC-6Cs flying the London—Bermuda—Nassau route were replaced with Britannias featuring a 98-seat, three-class layout comprising 14 first-class, 66 economy and 18 Skycoach seats (British residents only). Like its predecessors, these were Bermudan-registered. An additional weekly all-Skycoach operation using a 113-seat Britannia 310 commenced on 10 October 1960. All revenues – including those from first-class passengers – were shared with BOAC. Schedules were complemented by additional Britannia and DC-6 charters during the peak summer season.

On 27 February 1962, after a 2 year wait, Cunard Eagle took delivery of its first jet aircraft – a Boeing 707-420 bearing the Bermudan registration VR-BBW. Exactly one month later, on 27 March 1962, commercial 707 operations commenced, initially supplementing Cunard Eagle Airways (Bermuda) Viscount schedules on the Bermuda – New York JFK run on an ad hoc basis. This made Cunard Eagle the first British independent airline to operate jet services with fare-paying passengers.

On 5 May 1962, the airline's first 707 inaugurated scheduled jet services from London Heathrow to Bermuda and Nassau. The new jet service – marketed as the Cunarder Jet in the UK and as the Londoner in the western hemisphere — replaced the earlier Britannia operation on this route. Cunard Eagle succeeded in extending this service to Miami despite the loss of its original transatlantic scheduled licence and BOAC's claim that there was insufficient traffic to warrant a direct service from the UK. A load factor of 56% was achieved at the outset. Inauguration of the first British through-plane service between London and Miami also helped Cunard Eagle increase utilisation of its 707s.

==== BOAC-Cunard ====
BOAC countered Eagle's move to establish itself as a full-fledged scheduled transatlantic competitor on its Heathrow—JFK flagship route by forming BOAC-Cunard as a new £30 million joint venture with the Cunard Steamship Co. in summer 1962. BOAC contributed 70% of the new company's capital and eight Boeing 707s. Cunard Eagle's long-haul scheduled operation — including the two new 707s – was absorbed into BOAC-Cunard before delivery of the second 707, in June 1962. (Note: BOAC-Cunard eventually operated a fleet comprising 11 707-436/465s, two 707-336Cs and four Super VC10s) BOAC-Cunard leased any spare aircraft capacity to BOAC to augment the BOAC mainline fleet at peak times. As part of this deal, BOAC-Cunard also bought flying hours from BOAC for using the latter's aircraft in the event of capacity shortfalls. This maximised combined fleet utilisation. The joint fleet use agreement did not cover Cunard Eagle's European scheduled, trooping and charter operations.

Although Bamberg was appointed to the board of BOAC-Cunard, he became disenchanted with Cunard's corporate culture. He resigned from BOAC-Cunard's board in 1963 while continuing as managing director of Cunard Eagle Airways. His growing disenchantment with BOAC-Cunard's culture resulted in the decision to reconstitute Eagle by buying back control from Cunard.

=== Reconstitution of the company ===
Having raised his holding to 60% in February 1963, on 9 August, the airline's official name changed to British Eagle International Airlines Ltd. (the name Bamberg had given the new holding company on 1 March). It had a fully paid-up share capital of £1,000,000. Initial equipment included Vickers Viscount and Bristol Britannia turboprop planes. From 16 September, a new livery displaying the British Eagle name in full on the company's aircraft was adopted. This was a legal requirement following BEA's objection to Bamberg's original plan to incorporate the abbreviation BEIA into the new livery to avoid confusion between them.

==== Launch of competitive UK domestic scheduled services ====
In November 1963, British Eagle launched daily scheduled services between London Heathrow and Glasgow Renfrew with 103-seater, two-class Britannias. The inaugural London—Glasgow service – operated by ex-BOAC Britannia 310 Enterprise — was followed by daily two-class Britannia services from Heathrow to Edinburgh and Belfast the next day. Two Britannia aircraft were leased from BOAC to provide additional capacity. This was the first time an independent airline was allowed to compete with the corporations on the main UK domestic trunk routes and only the fourth time there was direct competition between private and state-owned airlines on domestic trunk routes anywhere. (Note: this already existed in Canada, Australia and Japan) It was also the first time a scheduled airline had offered a separate first class cabin on a UK domestic route. As British Eagle was restricted to a single daily round-trip on each route, it sought to differentiate itself from BEA. While BEA served these routes with 132-seat Vickers Vanguards in an all-tourist configuration with minimal onboard catering, British Eagle provided full catering on all flights. This included top-quality wines as well as the use of Wedgwood china and fine-quality glassware in first class. British Eagle differentiated itself by introducing assigned seating and "trickle loading". (Note: whereby passengers take their seats in the aircraft after checking in instead of awaiting their departure inside the airport terminal) The former was a first for a UK scheduled domestic carrier while the airline claimed to have started the latter in the UK as well. Although British Eagle provided a standby aircraft to maintain the integrity of its schedules, flights were timed to provide eight-hours' work per day for one aircraft to maximise utilisation. BEA, whose frequencies were not restricted, responded to the challenge on its three most important domestic routes by scheduling additional flights that departed and arrived at the same time or within 10 minutes of its rival's scheduled departure and arrival times. This had the effect of "sandwiching" British Eagle's flights. BEA's response also included the introduction of trickle loading and subsequent introduction of full onboard catering as well as a separate first class cabin.

==== Acquisition of Starways ====
On 31 December 1963, British Eagle took over Liverpool-based Starways. This gave it access to a fast-growing network of regional scheduled routes from Liverpool – including the busy London route – and to several IT contracts from locally based tour operators. British Eagle's ability to control the important Liverpool—London route strengthened its position in the UK's internal air travel market generally and on the main domestic trunk routes from Heathrow in particular. The Starways fleet – two Vickers Viscounts, three Douglas DC-4s and three DC-3s – was not included in the takeover and subsequently disposed of. Instead, to provide sufficient capacity to operate the combined airline's flying programme, British Eagle purchased an additional three Viscount 700s. Despite losing £80,000 during its first year of operation, the reconstituted airline gradually regained profitability.

==== Integration of Starways ====
On 1 January 1964, British Eagle – Starways began operating the Liverpool—Heathrow route at a frequency of three flights a day in each direction. Two of these were non-stop, using both Britannias and Viscounts. An additional Viscount service routed via Chester Airport. The same day, the new airline combine assumed the former Starways operation between Liverpool and Glasgow. The remaining Starways routes were taken over by 1 April. By that time, the joint Eagle – Starways fleet comprised 18 aircraft, consisting of 10 Britannias, five Viscounts and three DC-6s. Of these, three Viscounts were stationed at Liverpool. Starways was officially renamed British Eagle (Liverpool) Ltd. in September 1964.

=== The later years and closure (1964–1968) ===
In January 1964 the airline acquired two Britannia aircraft (ex-Transcontinental SA) for modification to freighters. Following modification they entered service in July 1964 in support of the UK's Blue Steel missile programme ferrying equipment and personnel to the Woomera Test Range in Australia.

==== Temporary withdrawal of UK domestic services ====
By October 1964, British Eagle had accumulated a deficit of £300,000 on its domestic scheduled operations. Load factors on the Belfast route averaged only 13%. Persistent refusal of British Eagle's requests for a frequency increase led to Bamberg's decision to suspend his airline's domestic operations as of 20 February 1965.

==== Return to profitability ====
British Eagle's financial and traffic results for 1964 were published at the start of 1965. These showed that after writing off losses of up to £350,000 for the development of domestic scheduled services, the airline earned an operating surplus of £853,700. The retained net profit amounted to £101,500. This represented 2% of total assets employed (£4.9 million), after allowing for depreciation and other charges. This set of figures marked the first profitable period of operation following reconstitution.

==== Limited resumption of UK domestic services ====
Following the suspension of British Eagle's scheduled operations on the three main domestic trunk routes from Heathrow to Glasgow, Edinburgh and Belfast, BUA applied to the ATLB to have these licences transferred to itself. BUA wanted to operate the former British Eagle routes with its new BAC One-Elevens from its Gatwick base at similar frequencies (10–12 round-trips per week). It argued that its proposed services were primarily intended as domestic feeders for its growing international scheduled and non-scheduled operations at Gatwick, that this was supported by contemporary Government policy giving preference to that airport's development to improve utilisation and enable it to become profitable, and that it would relieve congestion at Heathrow. BUA furthermore argued that the use of a different London terminal serving a distinct catchment area would divert little traffic from BEA, thereby minimising the competitive impact on the corporation. In addition to requesting revocation and transfer of British Eagle's licences for London—Glasgow, London—Edinburgh and London—Belfast, BUA also sought scheduled service licences for London—Birmingham and London—Manchester (to be operated from Gatwick as well).

BUA's attempt to have British Eagle stripped of its licences to operate scheduled services on the three main UK domestic trunk routes resulted in the latter's decision to resume operations on Heathrow—Glasgow on 5 July 1965, at a frequency of three return flights per day. Two of these operated non-stop while the remaining one routed via Liverpool. Combining its licences for unrestricted frequencies between Heathrow and Liverpool, a maximum of two daily return flights on Heathrow—Glasgow as well as 17 weekly Liverpool—Glasgow round-trips, enabled British Eagle to operate the Heathrow—Glasgow route at a higher frequency.

==== Preparations to restart jet operations ====
By early 1965, British Eagle had a fleet of 24 turboprop aircraft in service, comprising 17 Bristol Britannia 300s – out of a total of 23 that were eventually operated – and seven Vickers Viscount 700s. By the end of that year, the airline's turnover had increased by 37% to almost £12 million and net profit had recovered to £350,000. In addition, Bamberg announced an order for three series 300 One-Elevens including a further three options, heralding Eagle's comeback as a jet operator.

Part of the come back strategy was to provide London passengers a better experience with its check in facility in Knightsbridge, it required a coach service to Heathrow, this resulted the acquisition of Rickards Coaches and the purchase of twenty new luxury coaches, around 9,000 passengers a week used this service.

By late 1965, British Eagle placed an order for two Boeing 707-320Cs. The aircraft, which were to be delivered in early 1967, were primarily intended for passenger and freight charters to the Far East and Australia. To avoid paying the 14% tax the British Government had imposed on imported, new foreign aircraft to protect competing British models, the airline needed to persuade the Board of Trade that there was no equivalent home-grown alternative. It also cited the Board's earlier decision to approve BOAC's application for an import duty waiver on two new Boeing 707-336Cs as a precedent. Despite being offered a mixed-traffic version of the Super VC10 and acknowledging that aircraft's superior passenger appeal, British Eagle favoured the 707-320C because of its greater payload and range. This made the 707 a more attractive aircraft for the kind of charter operations envisaged.

==== Aden evacuation ====
British Eagle played a part in the British evacuation of Aden in 1967. The 2008 book From Barren Rocks...to Living Stones by Jon Magee records how one of its fleet, a Britannia, intended for a run to the Far East was commandeered at short notice as the emergency escalated.

==== Future fleet plans ====
The plan British Eagle developed in early 1966 for its future fleet requirements aimed to have 25 aircraft in service by the end of the decade, envisaging the operation of 15 jet aircraft – including two widebodies — and 10 turboprop planes. The former were to comprise two Boeing 747 freighters, five 707-320Cs for the carriage of both passengers and cargo and eight BAC One-Elevens – the last three of which were to be Quick Change (QC) models that could either be used as passenger or freight carriers. The latter were to consist of 10 Britannias. The end of a number of Ministry of Defence contracts in 1966 saw the airline with surplus aircraft and two Britannias were sold to Air Spain.

==== Inauguration of Heathrow's first domestic jet schedules ====
The simultaneous arrival at Glasgow of BEA's first Comet 4B revenue service and a British Eagle BAC One-Eleven proving flight from Heathrow on 2 May 1966 coincided with the opening of the city's new Abbotsinch Airport. This event was followed by British Eagle's first Heathrow—Glasgow One-Eleven revenue service on 9 May, making it the second British independent airline after BUA to operate scheduled jet services on domestic trunk routes. Although BUA's services preceded BEA's and British Eagle's by four months, this occasion marked the first time jets were used to operate scheduled services on a domestic trunk route from Heathrow. It also marked the first time parallel jet competition was introduced on a UK domestic trunk route, (Note: as opposed to indirect jet competition provided by BUA's InterJet services from Gatwick) as well as the fourth time such competition was introduced anywhere. (Note: following its prior introduction on internal routes in the US, Australia and Japan) British Eagle initially operated its scheduled domestic jet services with a pair of 200 series One-Elevens leased from the Central African Airways, pending delivery of the UK carrier's first three One-Eleven 300s between the end of May and July. British Eagle marketed its 79-seat, all-tourist Heathrow—Glasgow One-Eleven jet services as a better and faster alternative to BEA's Comet 4B services and as a less time-consuming option compared with BUA's Gatwick—Glasgow InterJet One-Eleven service.

==== New business opportunities ====
In addition to operating the new One-Elevens on its own scheduled and non-scheduled services, British Eagle also offered its new short-haul jets to other airlines on a contract basis. These were mainly wet leases. KLM, Scandinavian Airlines and Swissair were among the airline's most prominent wet lease customers. By 1966, annual passenger numbers had increased to 944,488 (up from 153,000 in 1963) while profits had reached £585,000.

==== Completion of company reorganisation ====
The end of 1966 also saw the completion of the Eagle group of companies' reorganisation. This had resulted in setting up Eagle International Airlines as a new group holding company. Apart from British Eagle International Airlines, other subsidiaries included British Eagle (Liverpool)—the former Starways, Eagle Aircraft Services, Knightsbridge Air Terminal and Sky Chefs, the group's own catering company. This period furthermore saw Bamberg regaining 100% control of the Eagle group, as a result of his exercising an option to buy back Cunard's remaining 40% interest in British Eagle.

==== Deteriorating business environment ====
1967 was a bad year for the British travel industry. The brief Six-Day War between Israel and its Arab neighbours caused a temporary spike in oil prices while both the military coup in Greece and new Spanish access restrictions to Gibraltar resulted in fewer people visiting these places. In addition, the value of sterling dropped by 14.7%, as a result of many Arab countries switching their sterling balances in London to dollars and moving them to Zürich. These events were responsible for a sharp reduction in the IT business's annual rate of expansion—down to 12% to just over a million passengers after three years of spectacular growth. This in turn led to the implementation of a major cost-reduction programme at British Eagle following an estimated drop of 20% in projected summer holiday traffic, as a result of the challenging economic conditions. As a consequence, flightdeck personnel numbers were reduced by 48 (out of a total of 246).

==== Applications for transatlantic scheduled rights ====
In 1967, British Eagle—as well as BUA, Caledonian and Transglobe—also applied to the ATLB for licences to operate scheduled and non-scheduled services in competition with BOAC on several long-haul routes. British Eagle sought a 15-year licence for a London – New York passenger service to be operated with Boeing 707-320Cs from 1 April 1969 between either Heathrow or Stansted and JFK at an initial frequency of two daily return flights during summer (April—October) and one round-trip per day in winter (November—March). Similar licences were sought to operate to Los Angeles/San Francisco and Toronto/Montreal with Chicago as an intermediate stop. In addition, the airline sought licences for a London—Bermuda—Nassau—Kingston/Montego Bay mid-Atlantic and Caribbean service, with Chicago as an intermediate stop between London and Bermuda or Nassau. There were also plans to seek licences for a transatlantic all-cargo service between London, New York and six other points on the East Coast of the United States, as well as for a mixed passenger/cargo service between London and Hong Kong. As the latter was an unrestricted cabotage route, British Eagle intended to seek approval for a £125 one-way fare that would have undercut the existing fare by £83. At the forthcoming ATLB hearings, British Eagle planned to back up its case with detailed traffic statistics showing a marked decline in Britain's traffic share over a period of five years on routes shared with foreign flag carriers where BOAC was the sole British flag carrier. These figures indicated that in the case of the transatlantic scheduled air market between Britain and the United States, the American market share rose by 10% between 1962 and 1966 while the British share fell by 7% within that period. British Eagle wanted to use these findings to argue that licensing a second British scheduled carrier on these routes would substantially benefit the British economy by strengthening Britain's overall competitive position vis-à-vis overseas rivals in a dollar-earning market and thus complement rather than damage BOAC. British Eagle's applications competed with BUA's, Caledonian's and Transglobe's. BUA sought unrestricted frequencies across the North Atlantic to several destinations in the US and Canada, beginning with a thrice-weekly Gatwick—Belfast—JFK VC10 service. It also wanted to extend its existing South American routes via Lima and the Pacific to Australasia, hoping to convert this into a supersonic operation by the early 1970s. Caledonian sought transatlantic scheduled services linking its main operating bases at Gatwick and Prestwick in the UK with a number of destinations in the US and Canada, with particular emphasis on the West Coast of the United States to take full advantage of its growing fleet of long-range Boeing 707-320Cs. Transglobe Airways sought to operate scheduled passenger/cargo services from its Gatwick base to points on the US and Canadian west coasts.

Caledonian objected to the other independent airlines' applications. BOAC opposed all the independents' applications.

Before the route licensing hearings began, the BOT directed the ATLB to prejudge the four contenders' applications in order to concentrate only on those that stood a reasonable chance of success under existing bilateral arrangements. As far as British Eagle was concerned, the applications seeking licences for scheduled/non-scheduled services to Los Angeles, San Francisco, Toronto, Montreal and Jamaica with Chicago as an intermediate stop were not heard. These were withdrawn prior to the hearings' commencement on 16 January 1968.

BUA withdrew its own applications but objected to British Eagle's and Caledonian's. Transglobe withdrew its applications as well. British Eagle and Caledonian objected to each other's applications.

The ATLB heard British Eagle's applications, Caledonian's counter applications and BOAC's objections in early 1968. Following the conclusion of the transatlantic scheduled licensing hearings in mid-1968, the ATLB rejected British Eagle's and Caledonian's applications. It felt that the independents generally lacked the financial strength to acquire the then latest widebodied and supersonic transport (SST) aircraft for their proposed services and that these airlines had insufficient economies of scale to enable them to compete with BOAC and the American carriers on a level playing field. It also felt that it would take the independents too long to make these services profitable. In British Eagle's case, the ATLB was impressed with the airline's well-equipped and competent engineering organisation but questioned its ability to finance the envisaged expansion because it considered the company seriously undercapitalised for its existing operations.

==== Bureaucratic obstacles ====
Meanwhile, British Eagle's unhappiness at the Government's refusal to exempt it from paying duty on its new Boeing 707-365Cs led to a decision to postpone from February to December 1967 delivery of the first aircraft, swapping the second aircraft's delivery position for the first and arranging to take delivery of the second in mid-1968. The airline estimated that this delay had cost it US$1m in lost North Atlantic revenue. It also pointed out that this would have been enough to pay for the duty. The unresolved dispute between British Eagle and the BOT over the payment of import duty on two new 707-365Cs held up the first aircraft's delivery at the beginning of February 1968, with HM Customs demanding payment of £440,000 before releasing the aircraft. The dispute was resolved with the airline agreeing to pay the duty once the Bermudan-registered aircraft was operating in British Eagle livery. This was not going to be the case for at least another year as the aircraft had been wet-leased to Middle East Airlines (MEA) as of 1 March. British Eagle had made operating the aircraft in its own colours dependent on the outcome of the applications to the ATLB for licences to operate scheduled and non-scheduled services between London and New York as well as London, Bermuda and Nassau from 1 April 1969. The airline had held out the prospect of placing a follow-on order for an additional two 707-365Cs in the case of these applications being approved and relevant licences awarded.

==== Return to the Western Hemisphere ====
In addition to taking delivery of the first of a pair of brand-new 707-365Cs ordered directly from Boeing, British Eagle also began operating two second-hand, shorter-fuselage 707-138Bs sourced from Qantas. The latter aircraft were used to operate a new Caribbean charter programme. The arrival at Nassau of Boeing 707-138B G-AVZZ Endeavour on a pre-inaugural IT flight in February 1968 marked the airline's return to the Bahamian capital six years after Cunard Eagle's transatlantic operations had been absorbed into BOAC-Cunard. These services were subsequently extended to Jamaica, Antigua and Barbados.

==== 20th anniversary ====
By the time of its 20th anniversary on 14 April 1968, British Eagle ranked fourth among the five major contemporary UK airlines (behind BEA, BOAC and BUA, and ahead of Caledonian). The airline's 24 aircraft included eight jets, six of which had been acquired direct from their manufacturers. These included a Boeing 707-365C leased out to MEA and five BAC One-Eleven 300 series. Kleinwort Benson were the owners of the 707-365C and two second-hand -138Bs that had been acquired from Qantas, while Kuwait Finance Agency, the overseas investment arm of the Kuwait government, and British Aircraft Corporation (BAC) respectively owned three and two of the five One-Elevens. British Eagle operated all of these aircraft under lease purchase agreements with the owners. By that time, the company's scheduled service network included routes from London Heathrow to Liverpool, Glasgow, Newquay, Luxembourg, Dinard, La Baule, Lourdes, Perpignan, Gerona, Palma de Mallorca, Ibiza, Pisa, Rimini, Stuttgart, Innsbruck, Djerba and Tunis. The firm also operated a large number of inclusive tour flights from Heathrow and other British airports. Lunn Poly was its largest tour operator customer.

==== Waning prospects ====
The introduction of the £50 foreign exchange limit per passenger had caused a major contraction in the UK package tour holiday market during 1968. This left British Eagle with surplus charter capacity, especially for the main summer season. In common with other UK independent airlines that faced the same problem, such as Dan-Air, Invicta International Airlines and Laker Airways, British Eagle redeployed this surplus capacity to the burgeoning West Berlin charter market, where access was restricted to US, UK and French airlines. This resulted in British Eagle stationing a Bristol Britannia at West Berlin's Tegel Airport for the duration of the 1968 summer season.

In mid-1968, BOAC applied to the ATLB seeking revocation of British Eagle's Caribbean charter licence due to alleged irregularities in the conduct of the tour services. BOAC's complaint included claims that British Eagle was abusing the terms and conditions of its inclusive tour licence by promoting services as if they were scheduled services. The ATLB found in BOAC's favour and revoked British Eagle's Caribbean licence at the end of the summer season. To circumvent UK regulatory restrictions, the airline proposed to replace its IT flights between the UK and the Caribbean with a scheduled service between Nassau and Luxembourg through its Bahamian subsidiary, Eagle International Airlines (Bahamas), as the ATLB's and BOT's jurisdiction did not extend beyond the UK.

At the end of the 1968 summer season, British Eagle issued redundancy notices to 418 employees in London and Liverpool and announced the closure of its Speke maintenance base. These economy measures were put in place to counter a major business downturn, as a result of a significant decline in the IT market following the introduction of stricter foreign exchange rules for overseas travel, the end of the Far East trooping and Australian migrant contracts in March, and general economic problems.

==== Bankruptcy and aftermath ====
British Eagle and its sister companies ceased trading at midnight on 6 November 1968 due to growing financial problems and went into voluntary liquidation two days later. The airline's last-ever aircraft movement was the arrival of a Bristol Britannia from Rotterdam at Heathrow the following day. The financial crisis leading to the collapse of Britain's second-largest contemporary independent airline had been triggered by the devaluation of sterling and the tightening of the existing exchange control regime, which limited the amount of foreign exchange British holidaymakers were allowed to take out of the country as well as by the loss of the company's Caribbean licence. Poor decisions at senior and executive level, the end of the trooping and migrant contracts and economic difficulties had made British Eagle an increasingly unviable business.

The ATLB and some industry peers regarded the firm as seriously undercapitalised and saw this as a major cause of financial instability. The management's refusal to contemplate a fundamental change in the way the business was run, including a change in the top management itself, undermined the confidence of Hambros Bank, the airline's main creditor, in its prospects. These circumstances led to the withdrawal of Hambros's support. At the time of its bankruptcy, British Eagle operated 25 aircraft and employed a staff of 2,300, including 220 pilots. The failed company owed its creditors £5½ million; Rolls-Royce and Esso, who were owed £630,000 and £300,000 respectively, headed the list of creditors. The airline was dissolved at the end of December.

Following British Eagle's overnight collapse, other airlines moved quickly to take over the abandoned scheduled routes. Former rival Cambrian Airways assumed the Liverpool–Glasgow and Liverpool–Heathrow routes while BEA applied for the European routes from Heathrow. BUA added an extra daily round-trip between Gatwick and Glasgow and applied to serve some of the European routes as well. Dan-Air took over London–Newquay services, which it operated from Gatwick for one season from May 1969. Dan-Air also won the contest for the Travel Trust charter contracts for the 1969 summer season against stiff competition from BEA. These had originally been awarded to British Eagle and entailed operating Travel Trust's entire summer charter programme on behalf of its subsidiaries Lunn-Poly and Everyman Travel, the bankrupt airline's former in-house tour operators. These contracts provided additional work for four Dan-Air aircraft—two Comets and two One-Elevens. The latter were former American Airlines aircraft and the first One-Elevens to join Dan-Air's fleet. The Heathrow scheduling committee's refusal to allow Dan-Air access to British Eagle's former main operating base resulted in Dan-Air opening a base at Luton for the Lunn-Poly/Everyman flying programmes from London. In addition to the 1969 summer programme, Travel Trust also awarded Dan-Air a "time charter" contract for the following three years (1970–1972).

This in turn resulted in Dan-Air acquiring two further One-Elevens that had originally been operated by British Eagle.

In addition to the two former British Eagle One-Eleven 300s Dan-Air acquired from Kuwait Finance to complement the ex-American pair of 400 series as well as two former BOAC Comet 4s that were fully employed on the Lunn-Poly/Everyman charters, the other jet aircraft the failed carrier had operated/ordered found new homes relatively quickly. In early 1969, Laker Airways leased the former Qantas Boeing 707-138Bs from Kleinwort Benson for Bermudan $8,500 a month to replace Britannias on a new series of transatlantic affinity group charter flights. Two years later, Laker Airways also acquired a One-Eleven 300 from Bahamas Airways that had originally been delivered to British Eagle. BOAC purchased for £4 million the 707-365C British Eagle had leased from Kleinwort Benson (subsequently subleased to MEA). Caledonian acquired the 707-365C that had originally been ordered by British Eagle and delivered to Airlift International in February 1967.

The trademark of the company was later purchased by the Sceats family.

== Fleet ==
The following aircraft types formed part of the fleet during 20 years of operation:

- Airspeed Consul / Airspeed Oxford; two, 1956–57
- Auster Autocrat; three, 1949–53
- Avro Anson; one, 1949–50
- 1 x Avro Lancaster - one loaned by Ministry for photographic work, a second one was purchased for spares for the Yorks
- Avro York; nine, including three operated by Air Freight, 1949–55
- BAC One-Eleven series 200 & 300; five, 1966–, plus two on short leases
- Boeing 707 three, 1968–, plus one operated briefly by Cunard Eagle (1962)
- Bristol Britannia 18, 1964–, plus three on short-term leases
- 2 x Bristol Freighter
- 2 x de Havilland Dove 1 leased
- 4 x de Havilland Dragon Rapide
- 4 x de Havilland Heron
- 3 x Douglas C-54 Skymaster 1 not operated
- 13 Douglas Dakota 3 not operated
- 6 x Douglas DC-6 2 serie B leased
- 6 x Handley Page Halifax 1 leased
- 1 x Miles Gemini
- 1 x Miles Hawk Trainer
- 3 x Percival Proctor
- 38 x Vickers Viking 3 never operated
- 20 x Vickers Viscount series 700 & 800 - 9 serie 700 leased

=== Fleet in 1950 ===
In August 1950, Eagle Aviation's fleet comprised five aircraft

Aircraft	Number
Avro 685 York	3
Douglas Dakota	1
Handley Page Halifax	1

=== Fleet in 1958 ===
In April 1958, Eagle Airways's fleet comprised 19 aircraft

Aircraft	Number
Vickers Viscount 805	2
Vickers Viking	17

=== Fleet in 1962 ===
In April 1962, Cunard Eagle Airways had a fleet of 12 aircraft and employed 1,100 people

Aircraft	Number
Boeing 707-465	2
Bristol 175 Britannia 324	2
Vickers Viscount 755	2
Vickers Viscount 707	2
Douglas DC-6C	4

=== Fleet in 1964 ===
In April 1964, British Eagle's fleet comprised 15 aircraft and 940 people were employed.

Aircraft	Number
Bristol 175 Britannia 324	2
Bristol 175 Britannia 312	6
Vickers Viscount 700	6
Douglas DC-6C	1

=== Fleet in 1968 ===
In April 1968, British Eagle's fleet comprised 23 aircraft and 2,500 people were employed.

Aircraft	Number
Boeing 707-365C	1
Boeing 707-138B	1
BAC One-Eleven 300	5
Bristol 175 Britannia 300	12
Vickers Viscount 700	4

== Eagle Aviation/Eagle Airways/Cunard Eagle/British Eagle images gallery ==
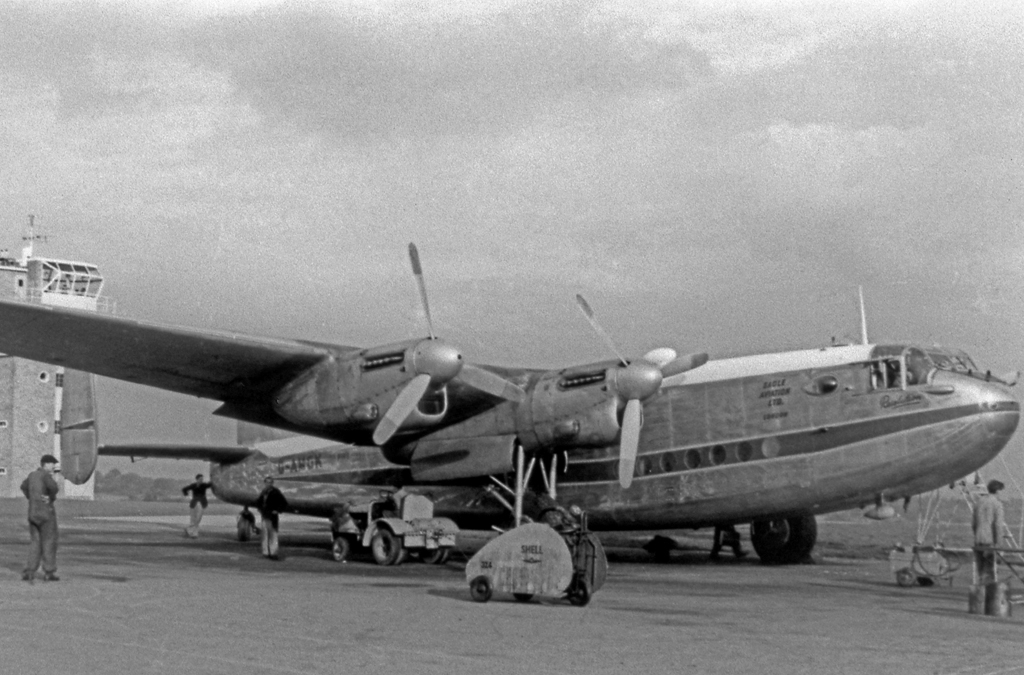
Avro York at Luton Airport in 1952

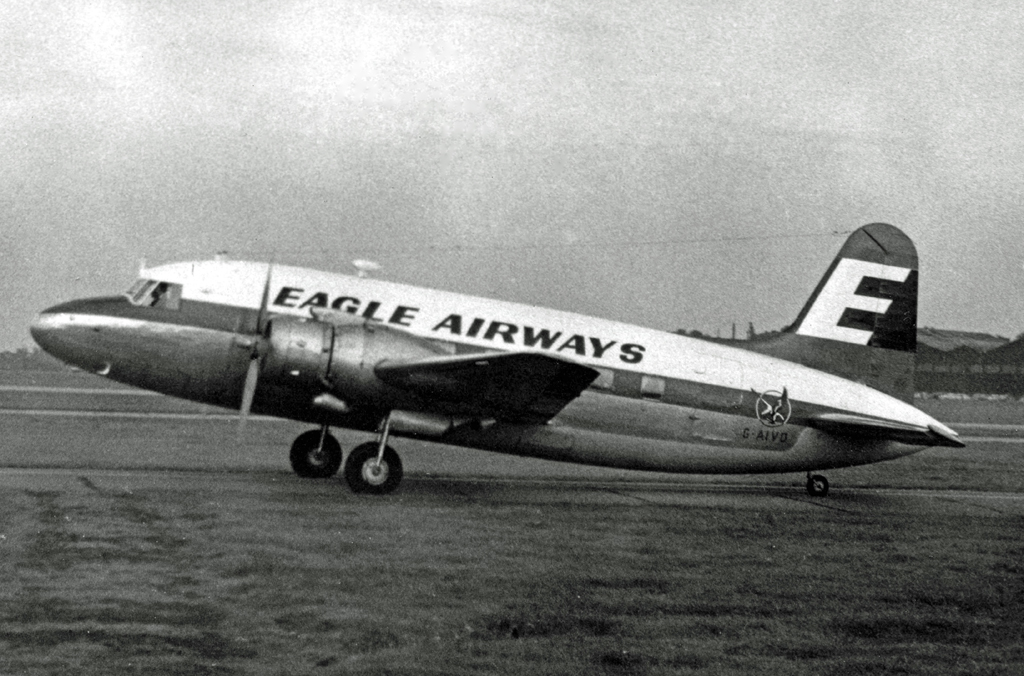
Vickers Viking at Manchester in July 1959

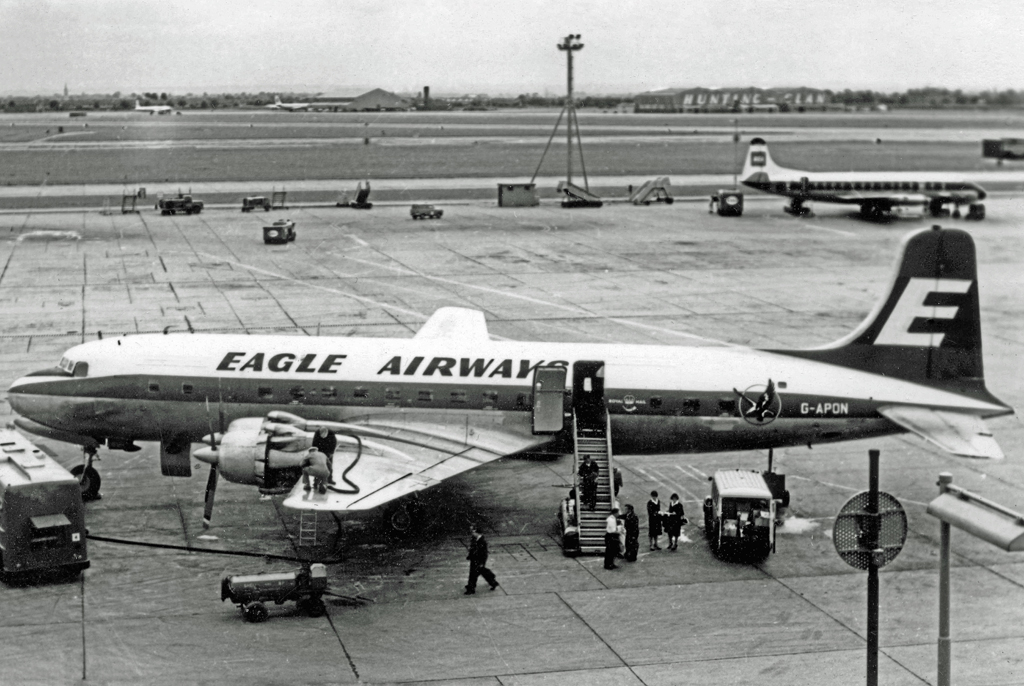
Douglas DC-6

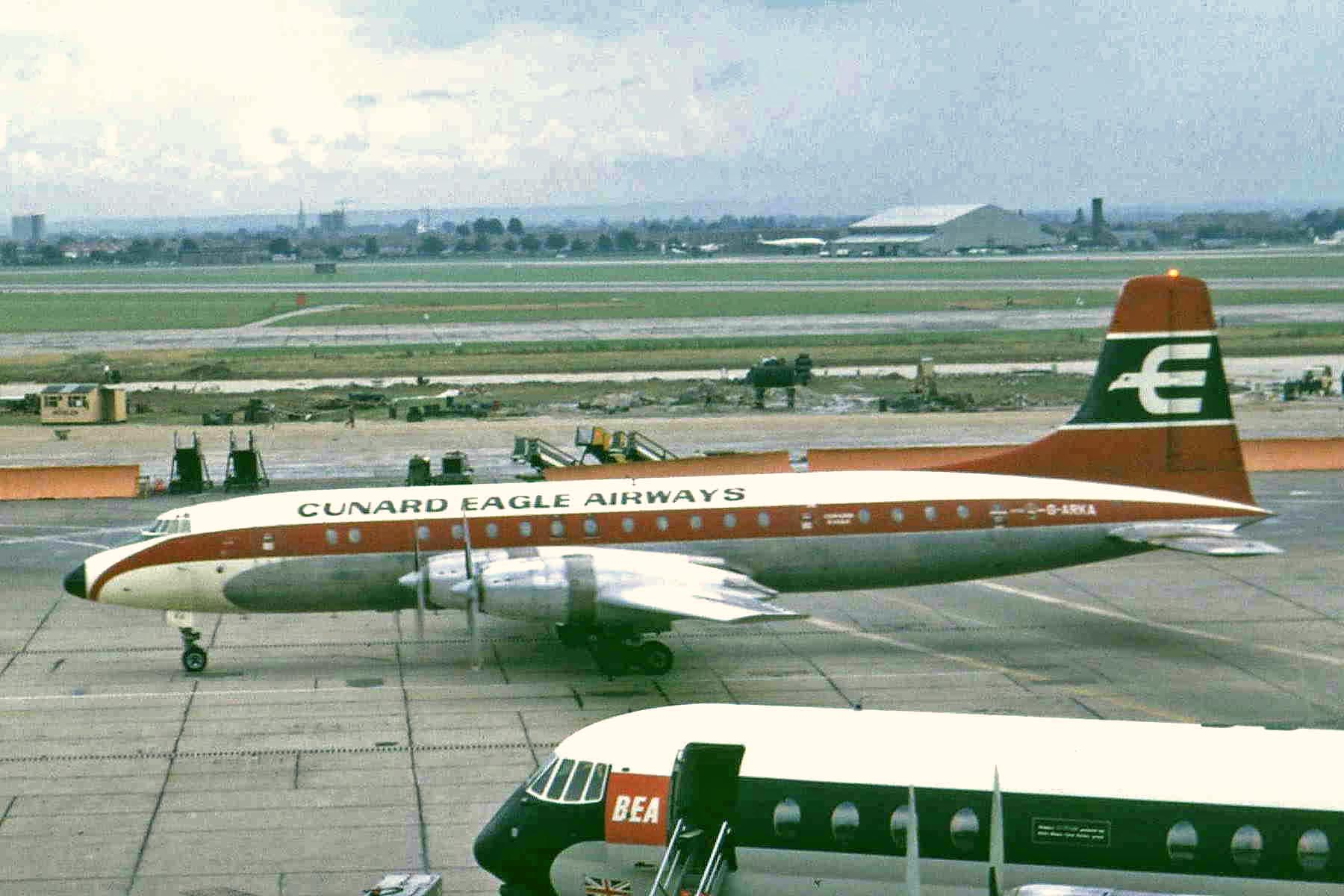
Bristol 175 Britannia 312

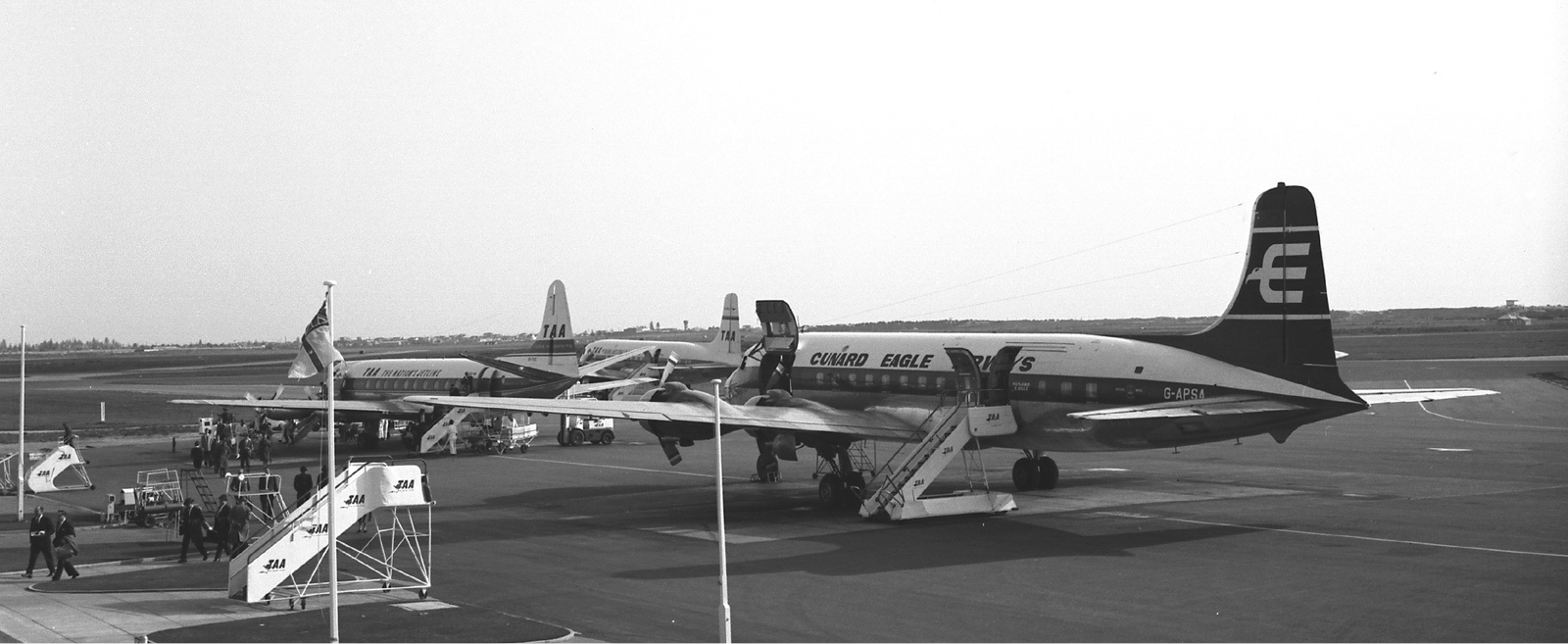
Douglas DC-6

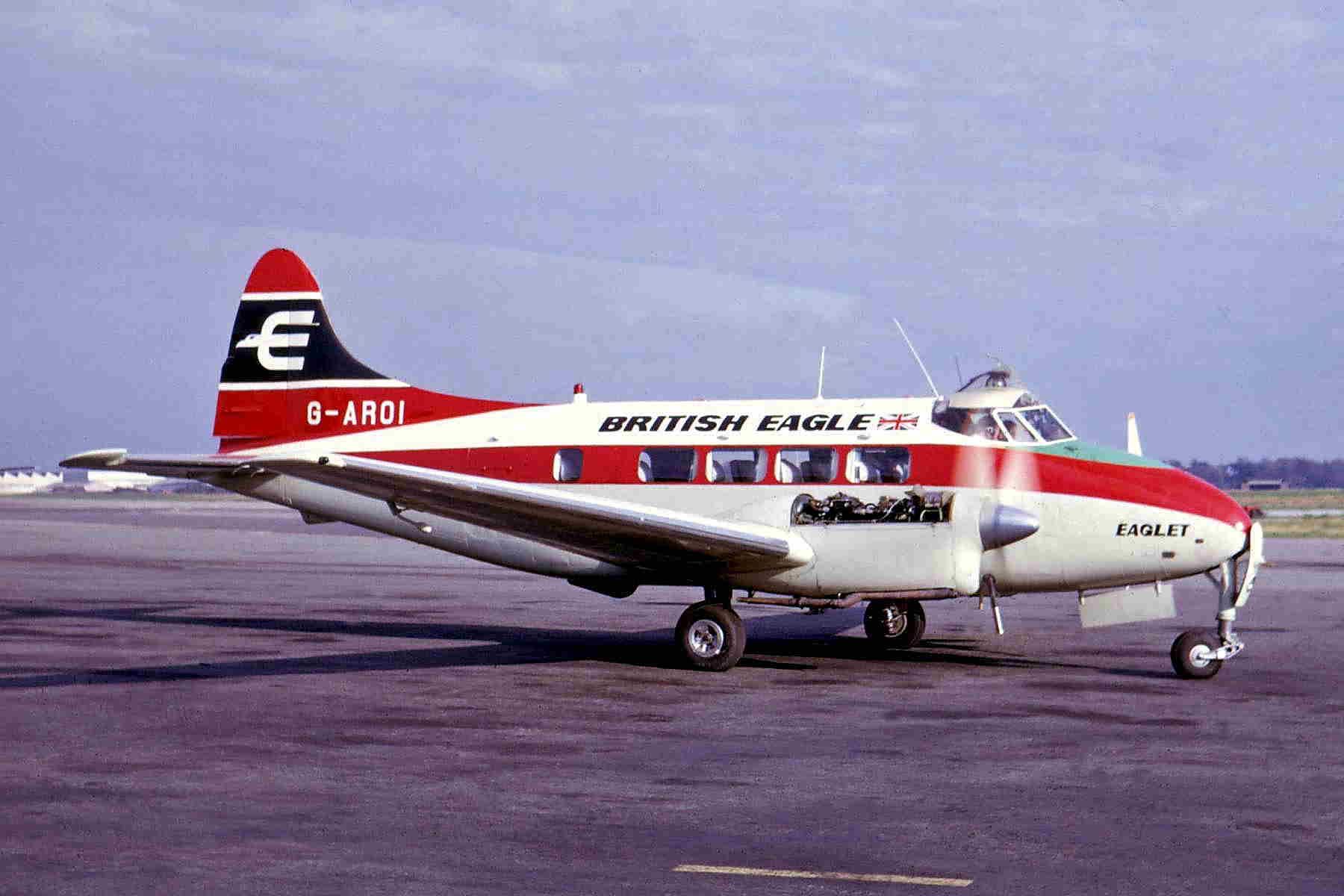
de Havilland Dove

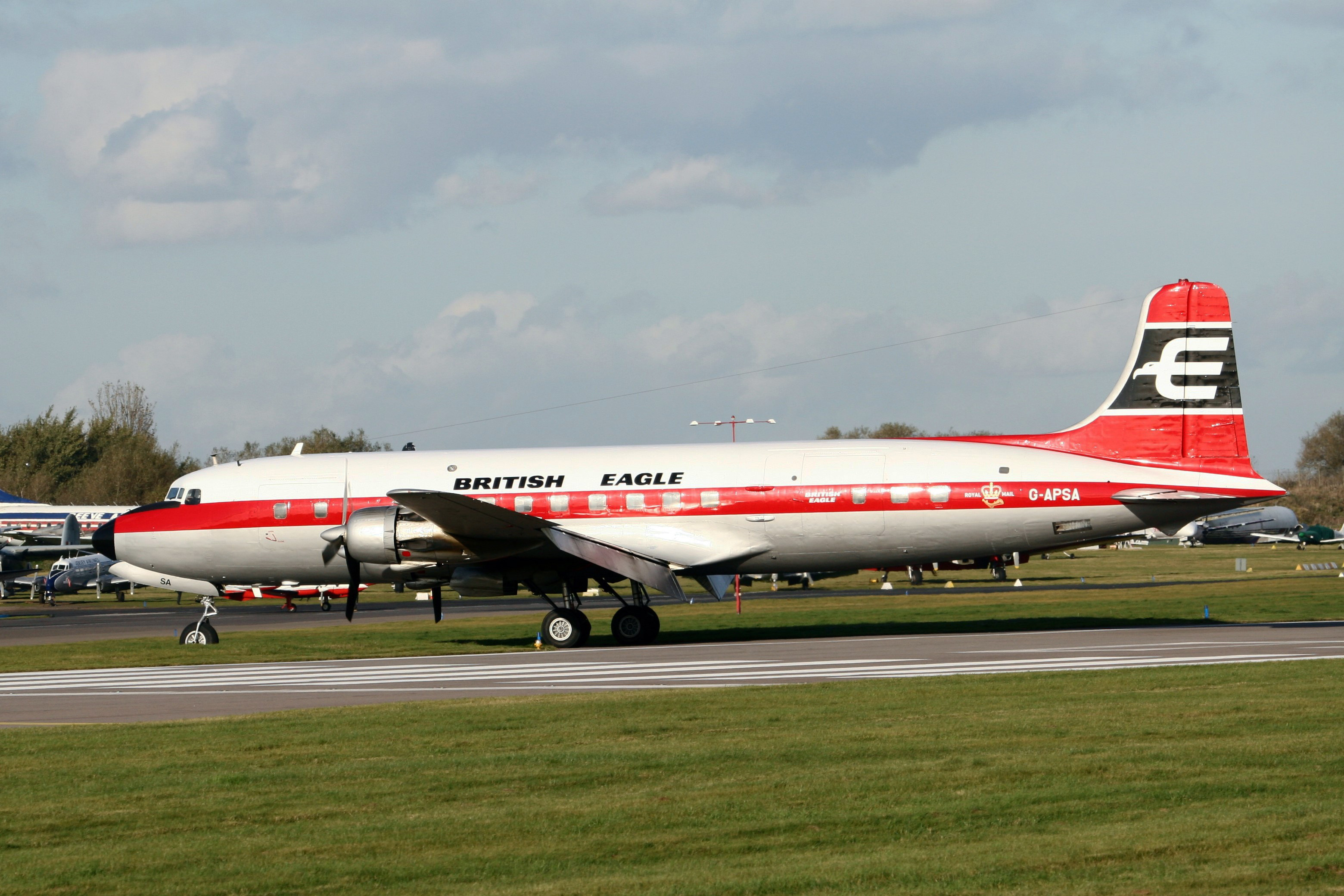
Douglas DC-6

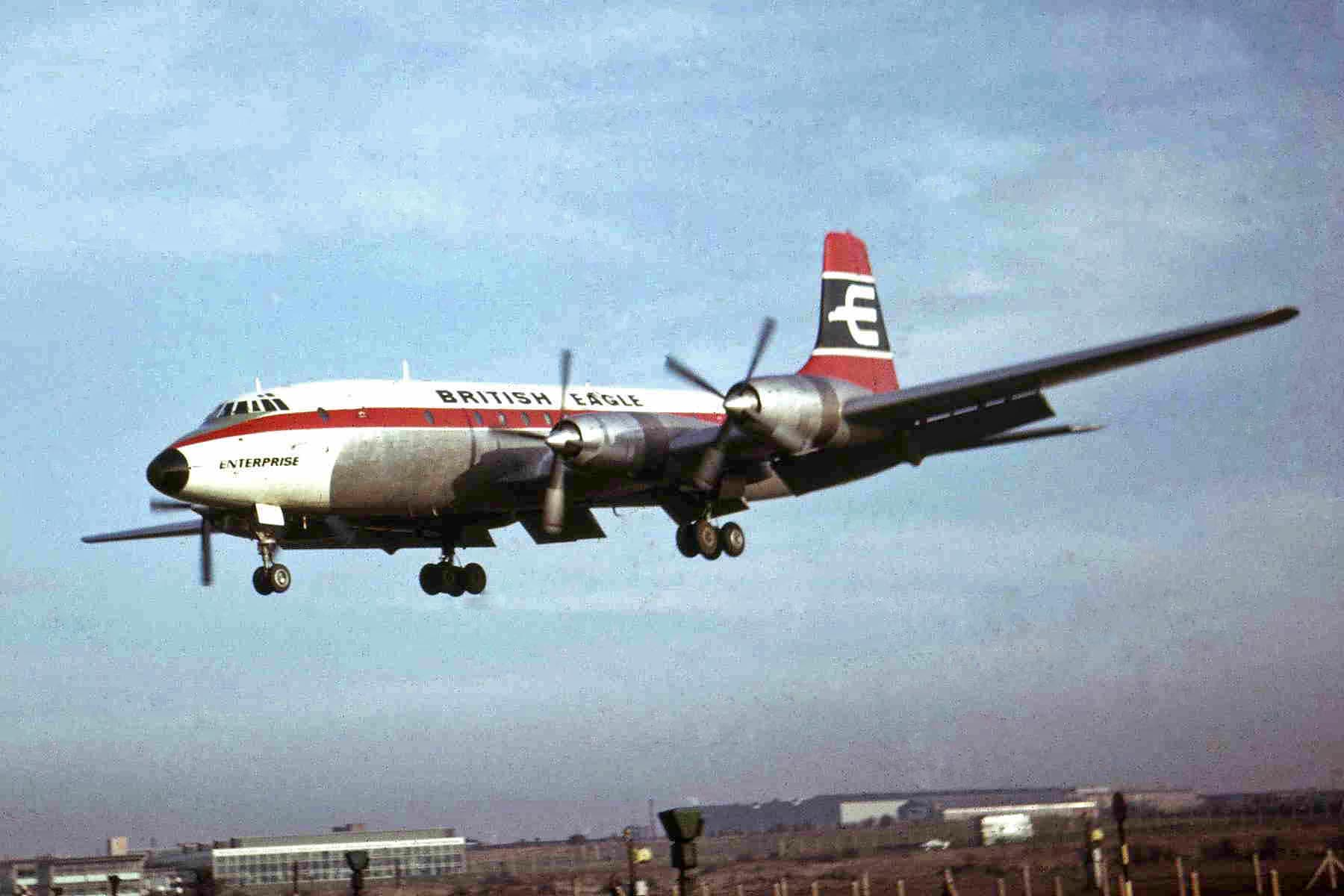
Bristol 175 Britannia 312

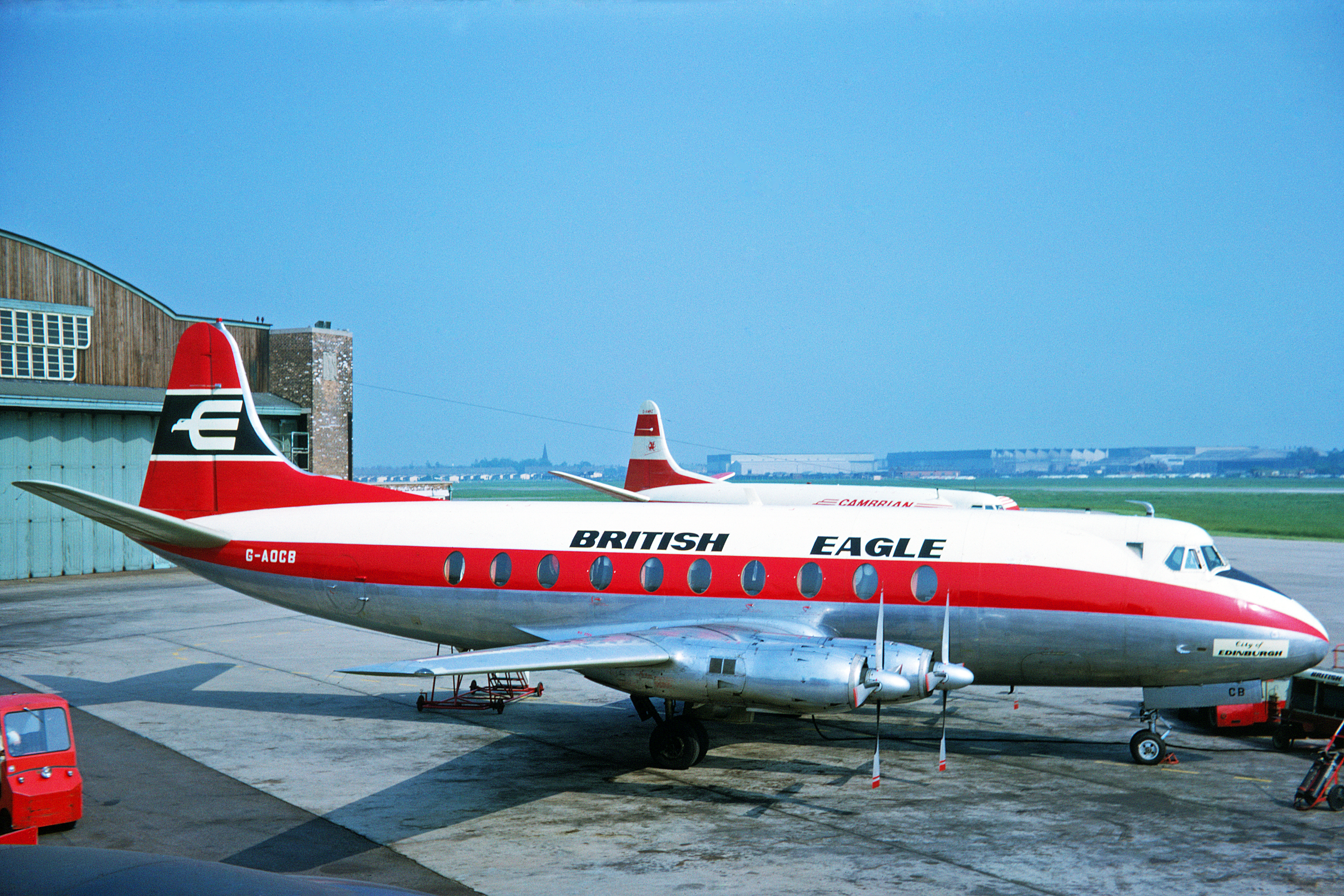
Vickers Viscount 700

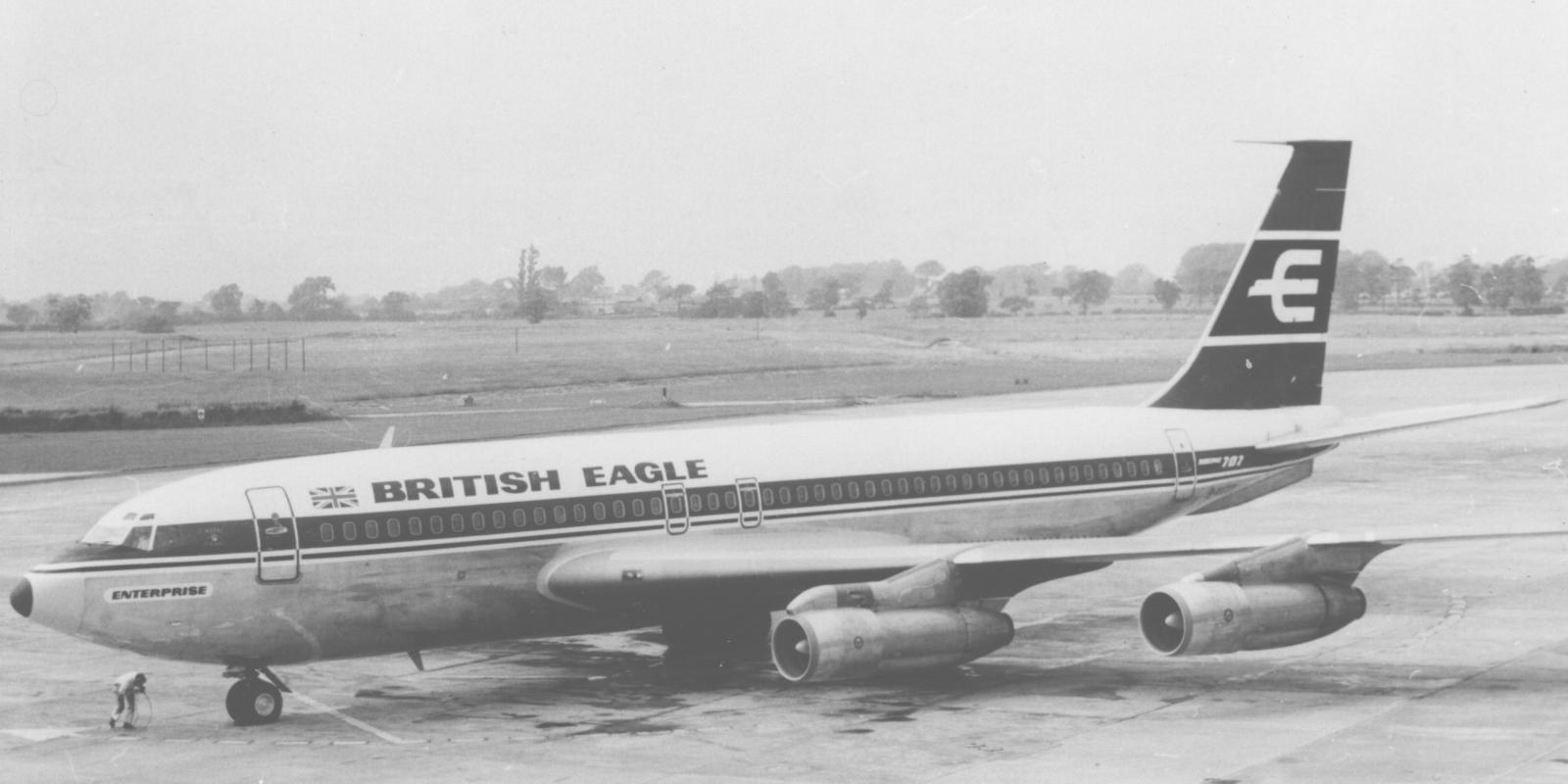
Boeing 707-138B

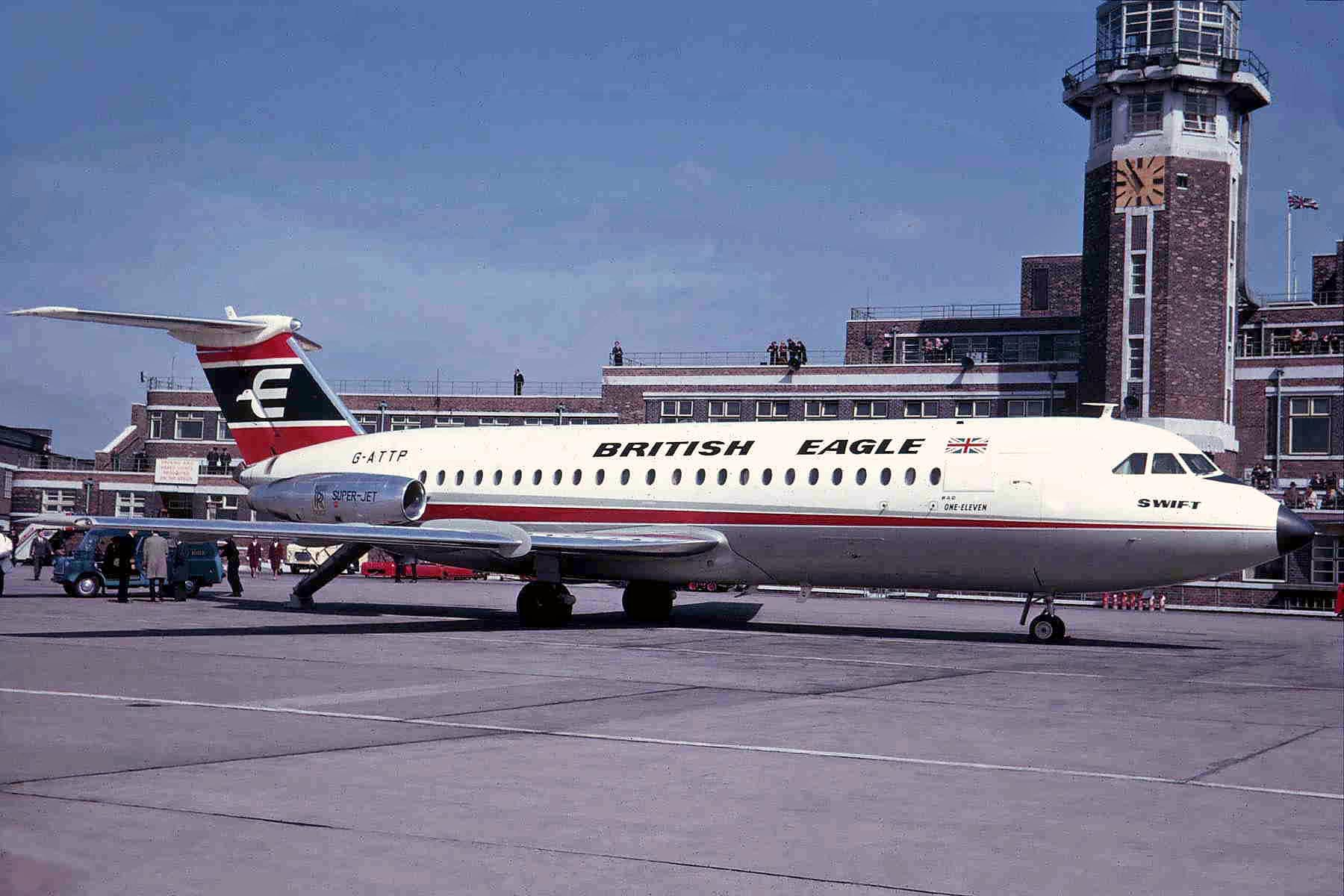
BAC One-Eleven serie 200

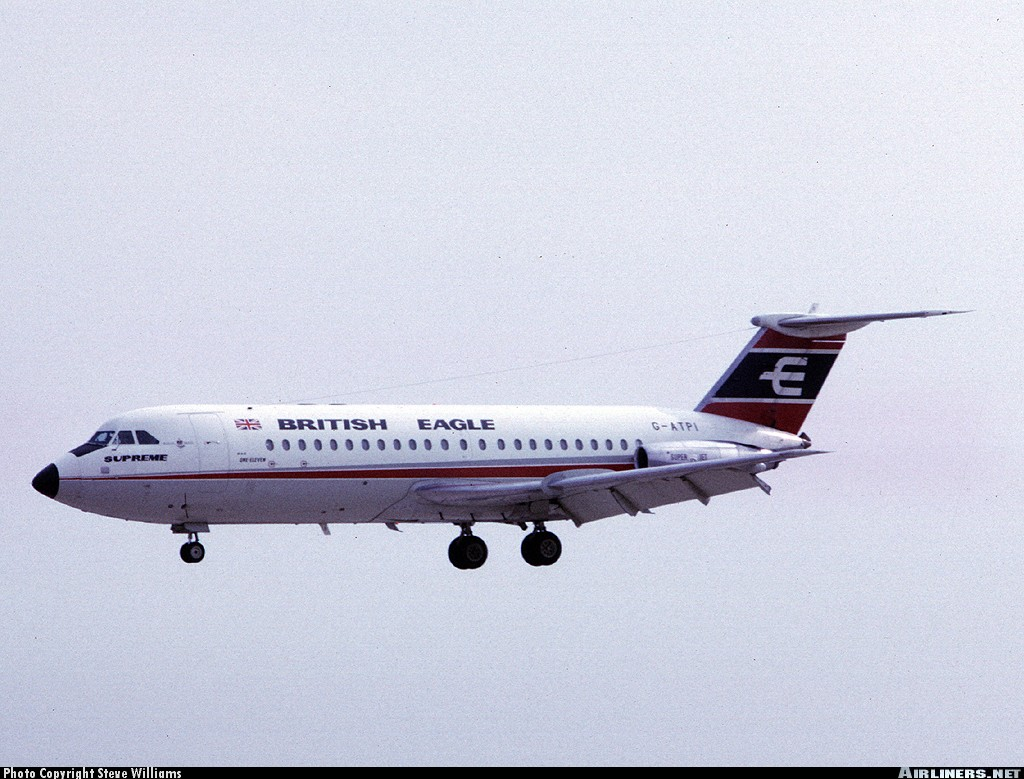
BAC One-Eleven 300

== Accidents and incidents ==
During its 20-year history the airline suffered five fatal and five non-fatal accidents.

1. On 25 November 1950, an Eagle Aviation Handley Page Halifax C.8 (registration G-AIAP) operating under contract to BOAC and bound for Singapore crashed on takeoff from Calcutta Dum Dum Airport, killing two of the six crew members in the post-crash fire that destroyed the aircraft and its cargo.
2. On the night of 1 May 1957, an Eagle Vickers Viking crashed at Blackbushe. It was operating a trooping flight to Libya under contract to the War Office. While returning to the airport to attempt an emergency landing two minutes after takeoff, its left wing tip struck the ground at Star Hill, 1,200 yd (1,100 m) from the runway threshold. This caused the aircraft to crash in an inverted position in a wood and catch fire. The crash and subsequent fire killed 34 of the aircraft's 35 occupants. Accident investigators established the probable cause of the accident as the failure by the captain to maintain a safe altitude and airspeed when approaching to land on one engine after the reported failure of the port engine for undetermined reasons.
3. On 9 August 1961, a Cunard Eagle Vickers 610 Viking 3B (registration: G-AHPM), named Lord Rodney and operating a non-scheduled passenger service originating at London Heathrow, crashed near Stavanger, Norway on approach to the city's Sola Airport, resulting in the deaths of all 39 on board (3 crew members, 34 schoolboys from The Archbishop Lanfranc School in Thornton Heath, London, and two members of the school's staff). The Norwegian accident report concluded that the pilot was off-course for unknown reasons. The aircraft crashed on Holtaheia, a steep hill, approximately 1,600 ft (490 m) high and about 8 miles (12.9 km) north of the airport at about 16.23 hours. See 1961 Holtaheia Vickers Viking crash.
4. On 29 February 1964, Bristol 175 Britannia 312 registration: G-AOVO operating flight EG 802/6, a scheduled service from London Heathrow to Innsbruck, hit the steep eastern flank of the Glungezer mountain at an altitude of 8,500 ft (2,600 m) while making final approach through cloud to Innsbruck Kranebitten Airport. The impact and subsequent avalanche killed all eight crew and 75 passengers on board. This was the airline's worst accident. The primary cause was the fatal decision to descend below the minimum safe altitude.
5. On 20 April 1967, a British Eagle Bristol 175 Britannia 308F (registration: G-ANCG) operating a non-scheduled passenger service from London Heathrow to Kuwait made an emergency landing at RAF Manston after the flightdeck crew experienced problems locking down the aircraft's retracted undercarriage following takeoff from Heathrow. There were no fatalities among the 65 occupants (eleven crew and 54 passengers). Accident investigators established that the undercarriage's failure to lock down was caused by a loss of hydraulic fluid from both the main and emergency systems. The hydraulic lines had been broken by the incorrect retraction sequence of the port bogie, itself caused by incorrect setup of a replaced sequence valve.
6. On 9 August 1968, a British Eagle Vickers Viscount 739A (registration: G-ATFN) operating a scheduled service from London Heathrow to Innsbruck crashed in West Germany on the Munich—Nuremberg highway near Langenbrück in a slightly nose-down attitude. The aircraft broke up upon impact killing all 48 occupants (four crew, 44 passengers). Accident investigators established an electrical systems failure as the accident's probable cause. This meant that during the subsequent descent vital instruments for indicating the flight attitude showed increasingly incorrect readings resulting in loss of control.

== See also ==
- List of defunct airlines of the United Kingdom

== Notes and citations ==
Notes

Citations
