= Solastranda =

Beach in Norway

Coordinates: 58°53′19″N 5°36′04″E

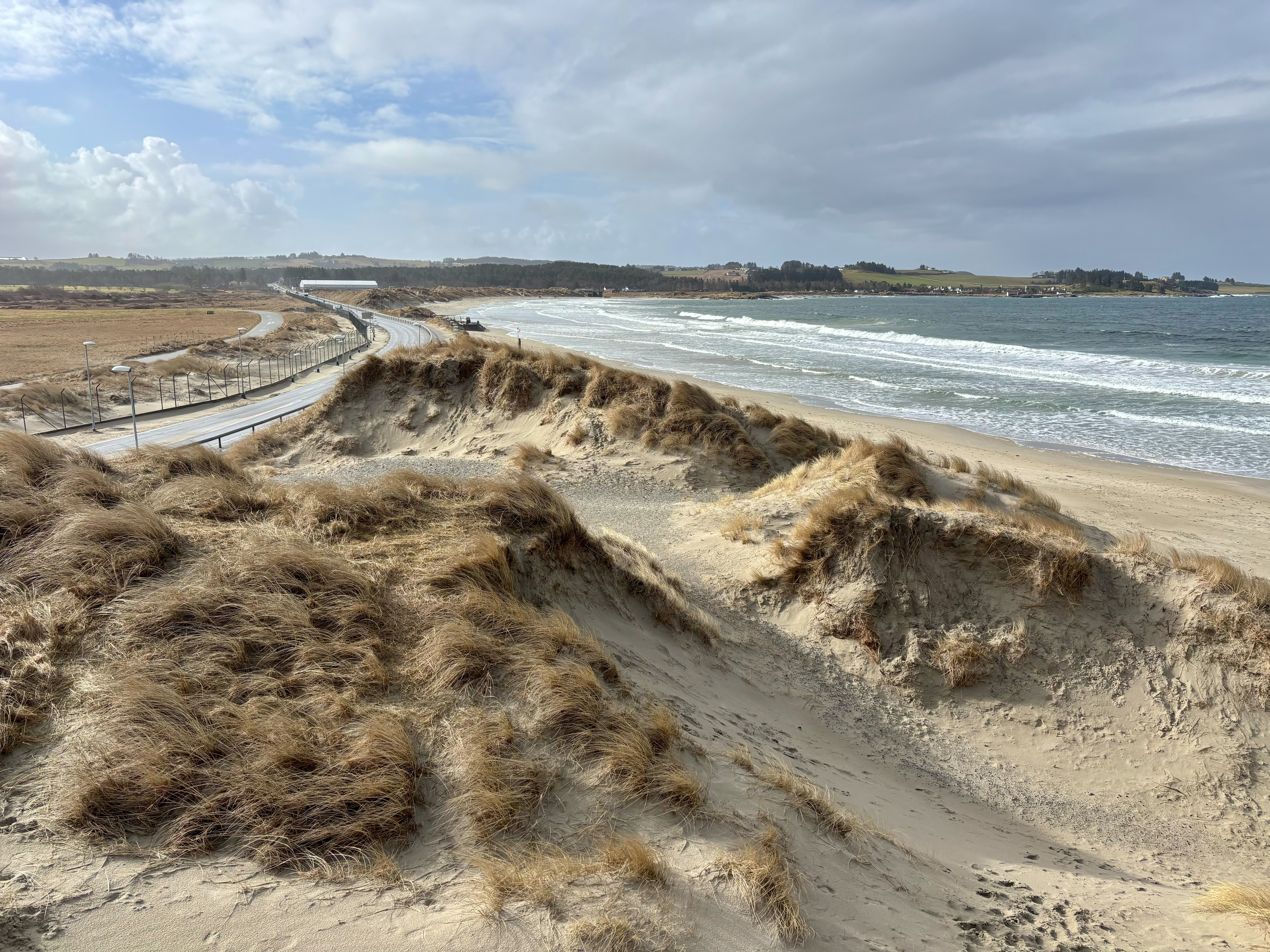
Solastranda

Solastranda or Solastranden (English: The Sola Beach) is a 2.3-kilometer (1.4 mi) long sandy beach in Norway, located 2-kilometer (1.2 mi) from Stavanger Airport, Sola and 15-kilometer (9.3 mi) from Stavanger. The beach is a popular beach for swimming and sunbathing in the summer. Windsurfing and surfing are popular all-year-round activities at Solastranden.

Sola Strand Hotel that also houses toilets and dressing room facilities is at the south end of the beach. A farm beach resort also offers dining and banquet facilities. There are also traces of German military activity from World War II. Sola Golfklubb is nearby the beach.
