= 1961 Holtaheia Vickers Viking crash =

Airplane crash in Norway

Holtaheia accident
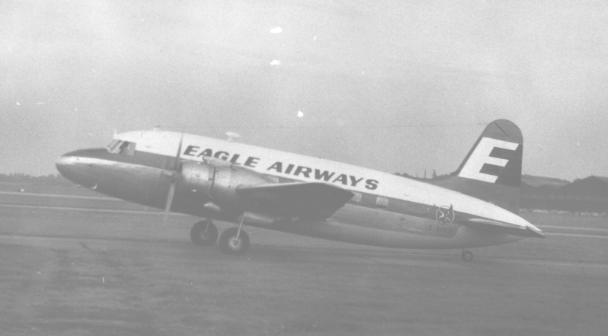
- A similar Vickers Viking operated by Eagle Airways in 1960

Accident
- Date: 9 August 1961
- Summary: Controlled flight into terrain
- Site: Holta, Strand Municipality, Norway; 59°05′07″N 6°03′41″E

Aircraft
- Aircraft type: Vickers 610 Viking 3B
- Operator: Eagle Airways
- Registration: G-AHPM
- Flight origin: London Heathrow, England
- Destination: Stavanger Airport, Sola
- Passengers: 36
- Crew: 3
- Fatalities: 39
- Survivors: 0

The 1961 Holtaheia Vickers Viking crash (Norwegian: Holtaheia-ulykken) was a controlled flight into terrain incident on 9 August 1961 at Holta in Strand Municipality, Norway. The Eagle Airways (later, British Eagle) Vickers 610 Viking 3B Lord Rodney was en route from London Heathrow to Stavanger Airport, Sola on an AIR Tours charter flight taking a school group for a camping holiday. The aircraft was making an instrument landing when it crashed 54 km (34 mi) north east of Stavanger. All 39 people on board died.

== Crash ==
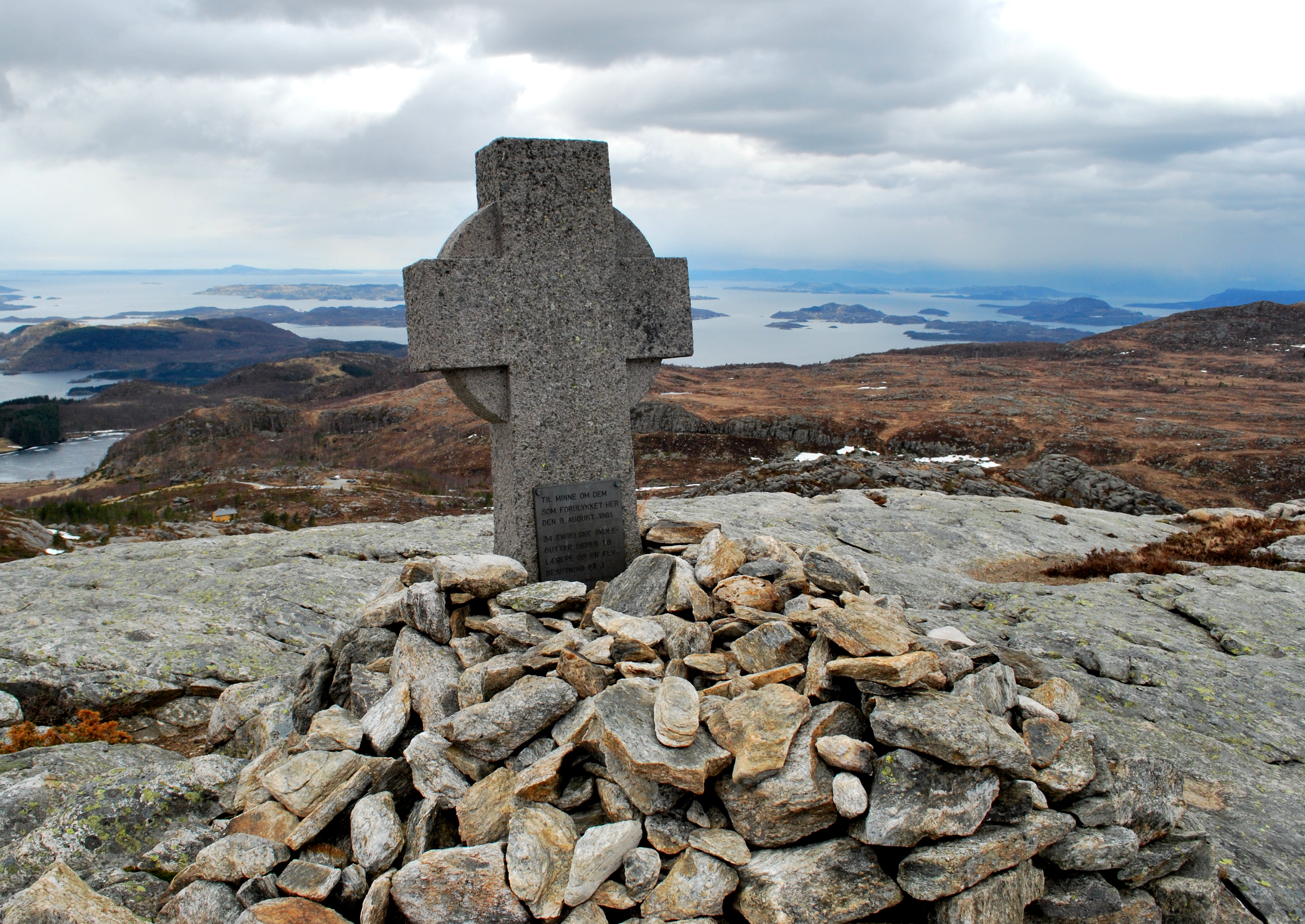
Memorial at the site of the accident

The Viking left London Heathrow at 13:29 on what was an estimated two and a half-hour charter flight. Between 16:24 and 16:30 it crashed 18 nautical miles (33 km; 21 mi) north-east of the airport on to Holtaheia, a steep mountainside at an elevation of 1,600 feet (490 m). The crash site was 30 feet (9 m) below the summit.

The aircraft was destroyed and an intense fuel and oil fire followed the impact. The search for the aircraft included an RAF Shackleton and Royal Norwegian Navy ships investigating the fjords in the area. The wreckage was found fifteen hours after the crash by a Royal Norwegian Air Force helicopter, 15 miles (24 km) east from the ILS track.

== Fatalities ==
The 36 passengers were a school party of 34 boys aged 13 to 16 and two teachers from the Lanfranc Secondary Modern School for Boys (now The Archbishop Lanfranc Academy) in Croydon, South London. The three crew members on board also died. The crash was at the time the deadliest aviation incident in Norway.

== Aircraft ==
The aircraft was a twin piston-engined Vickers 610 Viking 3B serial number 152 and registered in the United Kingdom as G-AHPM. It first flew on 2 January 1947 and was delivered new to British European Airways.

== Investigation ==
The report into the crash put the cause down to "a deviation from the prescribed flight path for reasons unknown".

== Aftermath ==
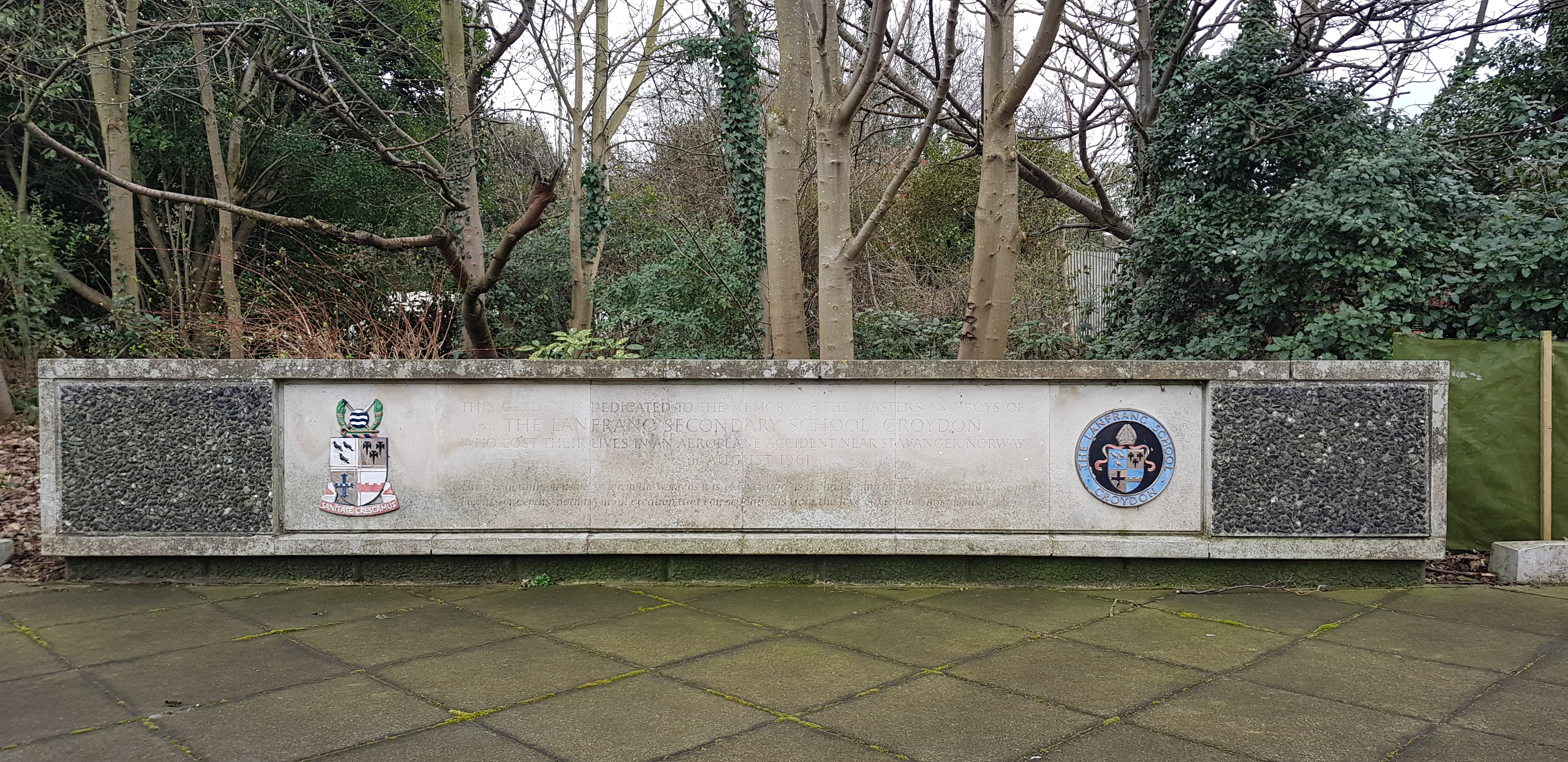
Memorial adjoining the communal grave in Mitcham Road Cemetery, Croydon

33 of the boys and one teacher were buried together at a communal grave at Mitcham Road Cemetery in Croydon on 17 August 1961.

Ewan MacColl, who lived in Croydon, wrote a song, "The Young Birds", about the accident.

== Bibliography ==
- Jones, Rosalind (2011). The Lanfranc Boys: the story of the Holtaheia plane crash in Norway. Avernes-sous-Exmes: Craigmore Publications. ISBN 978-0-9531890-3-8.
- Jones, Rosalind (2011). Flystyrten i Holtaheia historien om flystyrten som kostet 39 mennesker livet den 9. august 1961. Sandnes: Commentum. ISBN 978-82-8233-052-7.
- Jones, Rosalind (2017). The Papa Mike Air Crash Mystery. Craigmore Publications. ISBN 978-0-9531890-5-2.
- Martin, Bernard (1975). Viking, Valetta, Varsity. Tonbridge: Air-Britain. ISBN 0-85130-038-3.
- "The Stavanger Tragedy". Flight. 17 August 1961. p. 240.
- "Stavanger Accident Report". Flight International. 4 October 1962. p. 557.
