= Harefield Academy =

Location
- Northwood Way; Harefield, Greater London, UB9 6ET; England; 51.60672°N 0.47302°W

Information
- Type: Academy
- Department for Education URN: 135004 Tables
- Ofsted: Reports
- Chair: J Wilcox
- Principal: Tash Moriarty
- Gender: Coeducational
- Age: 11 to 18
- Website: www.theharefieldacademy.org

Harefield School is a secondary school in Uxbridge, London, England. Located on the site of the former community school, John Penrose School, which closed on 31 August 2005, it reopened as an academy in 2005 and specialises in sports. Among other connections, Watford Football Club provides coaching there (the school serves as its youth system), and it also hosts an elite gymnastics division. In September 2023, the school joined the academy trust QED, and changed its name to Harefield School.

In January 2014, the academy was one of three schools that featured in BBC Three's six-part series Tough Young Teachers. The series was filmed throughout the 2012–2013 academic year.

== Notable alumni ==
- Jazzi Barnum-Bobb, footballer
- Gavin Massey, footballer
- Sean Murray, footballer
- Jadon Sancho, footballer

== Sources ==
- Official Website
- Watford Football Club
- Gymnastics body
- Department for Children, Schools and Families case study
