= Tough Young Teachers =

- Genre: Factual
- Directed by: Rachel Harvie
- Narrated by: John Dagleish
- Theme music composer: Tim Atack
- Country of origin: United Kingdom
- Original language: English
- No. of series: 1
- No. of episodes: 6 (list of episodes)

Production
- Executive producers: David DeHaney; Fiona Campbell; Maxine Watson
- Producers: Ross Anderson; Sandi Scott
- Cinematography: Nick Plowright
- Editors: Stephen Devlin; Peter Hein
- Running time: 60 minutes
- Production company: Victory Television

Original release
- Network: BBC Three; BBC Three HD
- Release: 9 January – 13 February 2014

Tough Young Teachers is a British documentary television series that was first broadcast on BBC Three on 9 January 2014. The six graduate teachers featured in the series are Charles Wallendahl (University of Oxford), Chloe Shaw (Royal Holloway, University of London), Claudenia Williams (University of Birmingham), Meryl Noronha (King's College London), Nicholas Church (Imperial College London) and Oliver Beach (University of Birmingham & Cornell University). The six graduates are assigned to challenging schools within London by the educational charity Teach First. The programme tracks the difficulties that they face and the progress that they make in their first year of teaching.

== Episode list ==
No.	Title	Original release date	UK viewers
1	"Episode 1"	9 January 2014	796,000
2	"Episode 2"	16 January 2014	538,000 (overnight)
3	"Episode 3"	23 January 2014	N/A
4	"Episode 4"	30 January 2014	712,000
5	"Episode 5"	6 February 2014	N/A
6	"Episode 6"	13 February 2014	643,000

== Schools ==
- Archbishop Lanfranc School, Croydon
- Crown Woods College, Southeast London
- The Harefield Academy, Uxbridge

== Reception ==
=== Ratings ===
According to overnight figures, the first two episodes had audience shares of 3.0% and 2.2% respectively. The fourth episode was watched by 683,000 (3.0%).
