= Stavanger Airport =

Commercial airport in Sola, Rogaland, Norway

Stavanger Airport Stavanger lufthavn

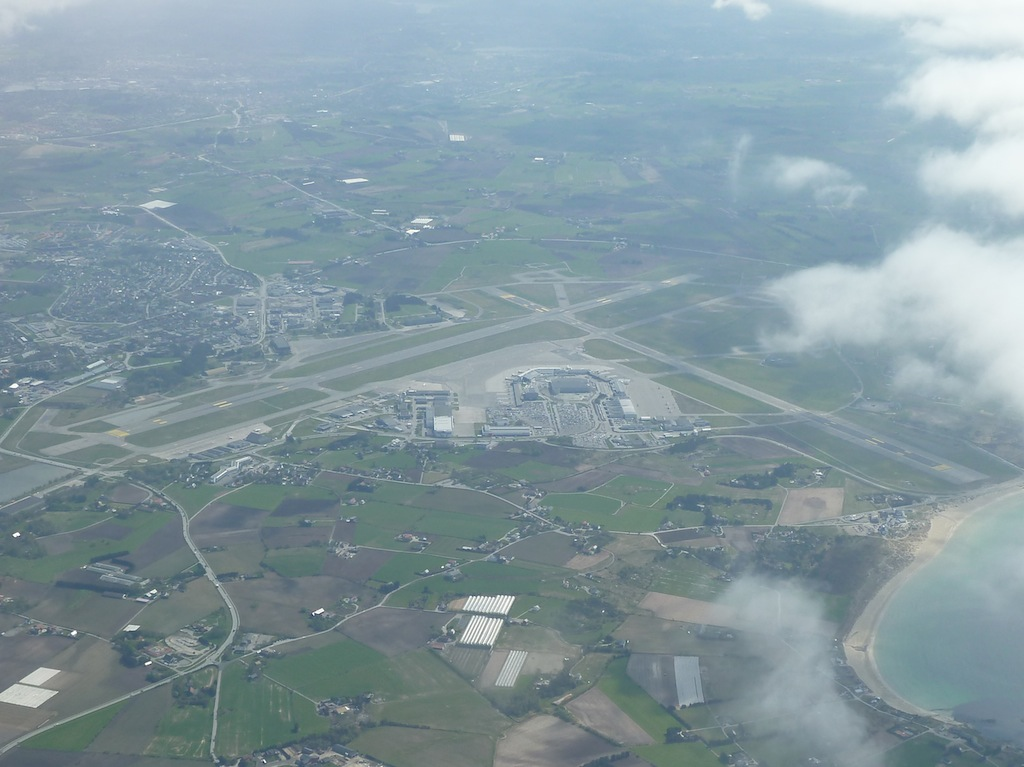
- IATA: SVG; ICAO: ENZV

Summary
- Airport type: Public / Military
- Owner: Avinor
- Serves: Stavanger; Sandnes
- Location: Sola Municipality, Rogaland, Norway
- Opened: 29 May 1937; 89 years ago
- Hub for: Bristow Norway; CHC Helikopter Service
- Focus city for: Scandinavian Airlines
- Elevation AMSL: 9 m (30 ft)
- Coordinates: 58°52′36″N 005°38′16″E
- Website: Official website

Map
- Location within Norway

Runways
Direction	Length		Surface
Direction	m	ft	Surface
18/36	2,556	8,386	Asphalt
10/28	2,449	8,035	Asphalt

Helipads
Number	Length		Surface
Number	m	ft	Surface
H1^{A}

Statistics (2019)
- Passengers: 4,309,723
- Source: Norwegian AIP at Avinor; Statistics from Avinor; A.According to the AIP "Off-shore helicopters mainly use RWY 10/28. SAR helipad E of RWY 18/36"

Stavanger Airport (IATA: SVG, ICAO: ENZV), commonly known as Sola, is an international airport located in Rogaland county, Norway. The airport is located 6 NM (11 km; 6.9 mi) southwest of the centre of the city of Stavanger inside the neighboring Sola Municipality and serves the Stavanger-Sola-Sandnes area as well as serves as a regional hub for southwestern Norway. It is Norway's third-busiest airport and 9th busiest in the Nordic countries, with both fixed-wing aircraft and helicopter traffic for the offshore North Sea oil installations. In addition, the Royal Norwegian Air Force operates Westland Sea King search and rescue helicopters from Sola Air Station.

Four airlines offer domestic flights to four destinations while 11 airlines offer international flights to 35 destinations. Two helicopter companies operate out of Sola. The busiest route is Sola–Oslo Gardermoen, which has about 28 daily flights. In the vicinity of the airport there is an aeronautical museum, Flyhistorisk Museum, Sola.

== History ==
=== Facilities ===
Stavanger Airport, Sola is Norway's oldest airport, opened by King Haakon VII on 29 May 1937. The airport was the second to have a concrete runway in Europe.

Originally, the idea was to locate the Stavanger airport at Forus in Stavanger Municipality, but after the war the Royal Norwegian Air Force decided to use Sola temporarily until the new airport was built, and nothing ever became of Forus.

Stavanger Airport has two passenger terminals, one each for airplanes and helicopters. The old terminal was demolished and made way for taxiway H. The airport has two crossing runways: the main runway, north–south (18/36) and the main runway for helicopters, which is oriented northwest–southeast (10/28).

Expansion of the airplane terminal took place in 2009. The new gates were built without jet bridges. The airport's two largest airlines, SAS and Norwegian, showed little interest in such amenity and desired quicker turnaround times. SAS though later said that they did want jet bridges for their larger jet aircraft, and only wanted gates without jet bridges for their smaller turboprop aircraft. The lack of jetbridges angered the societies representing the disabled and multiple sclerosis-afflicted, prompting several Rogaland politicians to put pressure on Avinor to reconsider the building. In April 2009, Avinor decided not to build jet bridges.

Offshore helicopter flights out of Stavanger commenced in 1966. Instead of operating out of Sola, the operator Helikopter Service decided to operate their services out of Stavanger Airport, Forus, a closed-down airport built during the Second World War. Throughout the 1970s and 1980s this became an increasingly problematic solution, not least due to increased development of the area. It eventually became inevitable to relocate the base to Sola. To allow for the transfer, the airport authority built a new, separate helicopter terminal at Sola, costing 56 million Norwegian kroner. It opened on 7 March 1989, at the same time as operations ceased out of Forus. At the same time Helikopter Service built an operations center at the airport, including a hangar and maintenance center. In total, the relocation from Forus cost about 120 million kroner.

=== Civilian airlines ===
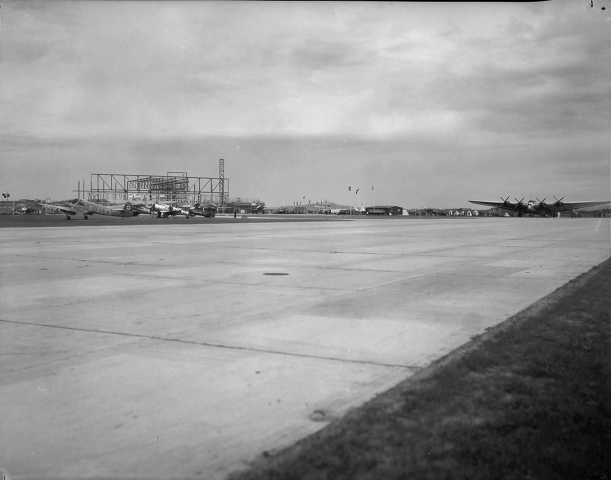
Sola Airport being opened, to the right a Deutsche Luft Hansa Junkers G.38

Det Norske Luftfartsselskap (DNL, later Scandinavian Airlines System or SAS) started flying to Sola after the war, as did Braathens SAFE in 1946 on its routes to Europe and the Far East with the Douglas DC-3 aircraft. In 1952, Braathens SAFE received concession to fly the routes Oslo–Stavanger, Oslo–Kristiansand–Stavanger and the coastal route Stavanger–Bergen–Ålesund–Trondheim–Bodø–Tromsø. Widerøe established itself at Sola in the late 1980s after they bought Sandefjord Airport, Torp-based Norsk Air. For a time, SAS operated intercontinental nonstop flights between Stavanger and Houston George Bush Intercontinental Airport (IAH) located in Texas in the U.S., with this service being operated by PrivatAir with Boeing 737-700 jetliners configured with 44 business class seats.

=== Foreign airlines ===
British Airways predecessors had started operating at Sola after World War II, in 1980 they started regular flights with British Aircraft Corporation BAC One-Eleven jet aircraft to London Heathrow. Later, the route was operated with Boeing 737-200/-300/-400s. For a period the Boeing 737-400 morning flight continued to Paris–Charles de Gaulle after London Heathrow as an extension of the flight. British Airways later started operating Boeing 757-200s with Boeing 737-200s flying new services twice daily to London Gatwick. SAS Scandinavian Airlines operates two daily rotations to London Heathrow, Norwegian operates a daily rotation to London, Gatwick. Dan-Air flew the route London Gatwick – Newcastle – Stavanger, until they were taken over by British Airways in 1992. Norwegian Air Shuttle has flown to Newcastle as well.

The oil industry has also required scheduled routes between Stavanger and Scotland, primarily to British oil center in Aberdeen. In addition to SAS, Air Anglia (later AirUK, KLMuk) flew the route. Today, this route is flown by Scandinavian Airlines and Widerøe. In the 1970s, KLM started flights to Stavanger from Amsterdam.

Air France also operated to Stavanger, initially routing Paris–Charles de Gaulle - Stavanger - Gothenburg using Boeing 737s. The route later became a twice-daily direct Paris - Stavanger connection using Embraer ERJ-170 jet aircraft, until it was discontinued in October 2015.

On 15 February 2010, Scandinavian Airlines announced that Widerøe would take over their regional routes connecting airports in Western Norway, including the route from Stavanger to Kristiansand. SAS will retire their five Fokker 50 aircraft by November 2010, and Widerøe will take over the operations and 75 employees, and serve the routes using Q300 and Q400 aircraft.

== Airlines and destinations ==
The following airlines operate regular scheduled and charter flights at Stavanger Airport:

Airlines	Destinations
Finnair	Helsinki, Stockholm–Arlanda
KLM	Amsterdam
LOT Polish Airlines	Warsaw–Chopin
Lufthansa	Frankfurt (temporarily suspended)
LYGG	Charter: Esbjerg
Norwegian Air Shuttle	Alicante, Bergen, Copenhagen, Kraków, London–Gatwick, Málaga, Manchester, Oslo, Seasonal: Antalya, Barcelona, Bergamo, Dubrovnik, Gran Canaria, Nice, Palma de Mallorca, Paris–Charles de Gaulle, Rhodes, Split, Tenerife–South
Scandinavian Airlines	Bergen, Copenhagen, Oslo, Trondheim; Seasonal: Alicante, Milan–Malpensa, Nice, Split; Seasonal charter: Preveza/Lefkada
Sunclass Airlines	Seasonal charter: Palma de Mallorca, Sal
Widerøe	Aberdeen, Bergen, Oslo, Sandefjord, Trondheim
Wizz Air	Gdańsk, Kraków

== Traffic and statistics ==
Annual passenger traffic
Year	Passengers	% Change
2025	3,978,666	▲0.1%
2024	3,974,095	▲0.6%
2023	3,952,233	▲10.5%
2022	3,576,772	▲96.8%
2021	1,817,163	▲8.5%
2020	1,674,900	▼ -61.1%
2019	4,309,723	▲1.1%
2018	4,262,480	▲2.0%
2017	4,178,241	▼ -0.4%
2016	4,193,665	▼ -6.8%
2015	4,501,368	

== Sola Air Station ==
The armed forces have a number of functions located at the airport. The 330 Squadron operated AW101 search and rescue helicopters are the only squadron left at the airport, but still a number of military aircraft can be seen at the airport. NATO's AWACS aircraft, VIP transports, airlift command and fighter and attack aircraft are regular visitors. Technicians and equipment at the Sola AFB facilitate turnover and housing of fighters, predominately the RNoAF F-35A, as well as other aircraft from NATO allies. Facilitating the Marines and Airforces training base, NATO FORSACS and NATO Joint Warfare Centre amongst others.

The Sola AFB is a NATO 24-hour readiness base for deployment of aircraft and military personnel in the event of a military escalated tension or conflict.

== Technical facilities ==
Sola has a number of technical facilities, and has the largest aviation technical environment in Norway, including the largest helicopter maintenance facilities in Northern Europe, Braathens had its technical main base at Sola, as does Norwegian Air Shuttle, CHC Helikopter Service, Heli-One Norway, Bristow Norway, Norsk Helikopterservice, Norcopter, Pratt & Whitney Norway Engine Centre and the air force's helicopter main technical base. Heli-One (when part of Helikopter Service) had final assembly of most of the Bell 412 helicopters when introduced to the RNoAF. Both Bristow and Heli-One have their heavy duty maintenance facilities for their Sikorsky S-92A at the airport. Heli-One also specialises in the maintenance of the Turbomecca engines and the gearbox of the Super Puma. The airport also has the only Norwegian education school for aircraft mechanics, they are certified by Eurocopter qualifying them to make conversions of Eurocopter helicopters, they perform heavy duty maintenance tasks for many operators and air forces of foreign nations.

On 31 March 2012, the board of Pratt & Whitney also decided to close the Pratt & Whitney Norway Engine Center. The last engine left the shop on 20 June 2012. All 195 jobs were lost. Later Gulf Aero Services opened a new engine center in the same building complex under the company name Aero Gulf, delivering basically the same services as the former Pratt & Whitney Norway Engine Center. As per June 2017 maintaining and servicing CFM56-3/7b/5b jet engines under the company name Aero Norway AS Quality Engines for a growing number of both domestic and international airlines.

The airport has a charge point, and started testing regular airfreight to Bergen with a Beta Alia CX300 electric aircraft in 2025.

== Runways ==
The airport has two asphalt paved runways: the main runway 18/36 measures 2,556 by 60 metres (8,386 ft × 197 ft) (Mark up, original 80 m wide, and runway 10/28 is 2,449 by 45 metres (8,035 ft × 148 ft) although initially built 65 m wide,. The two airstrips cross each other, but since they have a different orientation, they could never operate as individual runways for planes, but 10/28 is most commonly used as the activate helicopter runway, whilst 18/36 for planes, although the helicopters utilise the CATII on runway 18/36. 10/28 is used when the situation demands for it to serve as the main runway, typically when heavy winds from The Atlantic Ocean occurs, and landing in heavy gusts of crosswind makes it demanding to operate to and from 18/36. Although the orientation isn't ideal for operating planes from both runways, they are both most commonly active at the same time, 18/36 for planes and 10/28 for helicopters operating from it, having to keep well within the bounds of their intersection allowing for helicopters to operate from 28 to taxiway H, and departure from 11 from taxiway H, utilising both directions for helicopters, hotel and to the outer edge. Runway 18–36 has a CAT II landing system, enabling landing in very poor visibility. 10/28 has no traditional instrument approaches such as ILS, and is less frequently used, among other considerations to reduce noise emissions and flying over built areas, catering for population living in central parts of Sola municipality. The runway does however have low RNP approaches to both runway 10 and 28.

== Accidents ==
See 1961 Holtaheia Vickers Viking crash.

On 9 August 1961, a Vickers VC.1 Viking 3B (registration: G-AHPM), operated by Cunard Eagle Airways crashed into a mountain near Holta on approach to Stavanger Airport, Sola from Heathrow Airport with the deaths of all 39 on board: 3 crew, 34 schoolboys from The Archbishop Lanfranc School in Thornton Heath, London, plus two members of staff from the school. The Norwegian report on the incident concluded that the pilot was off-course for unknown reasons. The aircraft crashed into a hill approximately 500 m (1,600 ft) high, approximately 13 km (8.1 mi) north of the airport at about 16:23. The 50th anniversary was marked by a book published in summer 2011, The Lanfranc Boys by Rosalind Jones, sister of Quentin Green, one of the victims.

On 7 January 2020, a major fire broke out in the main parking garage, later found to have started from a vehicle with faulty wiring (2005 Opel Zafira) as the driver attempted to start the vehicle and it subsequently caught fire then quickly spread to nearby cars. The fire burned for nearly 7 hours, causing a partial collapse of the parking garage and destroying an estimated two to three hundred vehicles. An important factor that influenced the spread of the fire was a lack of a sprinkler system. No injuries or fatalities were reported.

== Bibliography ==
- Olsen-Hagen, Bernt Charles (2014). Offshore Helicopters: Helikopteraktiviteten på norsk kontinentalsokkel. Aviation Forlag. ISBN 978-82-999547-0-9.
