= The Archbishop Lanfranc Academy =

Location
- Mitcham Road; Croydon, Surrey, CR9 3AS; England; 51.3911°N 0.1304°W

Information
- Type: Academy
- Motto: Learning Changes Lives
- Established: 1931; 95 years ago
- Local authority: Croydon
- Department for Education URN: 141210 Tables
- Ofsted: Reports
- Principal: Simon Trehearn
- Gender: Mixed
- Age: 11 to 16
- Enrolment: 800 (2025)
- Website: www.lanfranc.org.uk

The Archbishop Lanfranc Academy is a coeducational secondary school located in the Thornton Heath area of Croydon, South London, named after Lanfranc, Archbishop of Canterbury from 1070 to 1089.

== History ==
The school was founded in 1931 as a boys' school in Thornton Road, Thornton Heath, near the junction with Mitcham Road and is close to Mitcham Common. In 1953 work began on a new school nearby in Mitcham Road, being opened in 1956 by the then Archbishop of Canterbury, Geoffrey Fisher.

On 9 August 1961, 34 boys and 2 members of staff from the school were killed when their plane crashed near Stavanger Airport, Sola, Norway. The fiftieth anniversary was marked by a book published in summer 2011, The Lanfranc Boys by Rosalind Jones, sister of Quentin Green, one of the victims. The school remembers this tragedy each year through its Memorial Day

The school converted from secondary modern status to comprehensive in 1970, merging at the same time with the girls' school of the same name. It became a comprehensive foundation school in 1998, administered by Croydon London Borough Council. The Archbishop Lanfranc School converted to academy status in September 2014 and was renamed The Archbishop Lanfranc Academy, The academy is in The Bec Trust, a single academy trust, and moved in to a brand new building in September 2018. The school continues to coordinate with Croydon London Borough Council for admissions.

The Archbishop Lanfranc Academy featured in the 2014 fly-on-the-wall documentary, Tough Young Teachers.

== Description ==
The Ofsted report of March 2025 opens with 'Pupils enjoy attending this friendly and welcoming school. They strive to achieve the academy values of Teamwork, Accountability, Leadership and Aspiration. Caring relationships with staff encourage pupils to try their best'; the school was judged to be Good in all areas. The Archbishop Lanfranc Academy describes itself as a modern, vibrant community and yet one with a long and historic tradition of educating students from the three London boroughs on whose crossroads it sits – Croydon, Merton and Sutton. The academy is proud of its history, and through its various incarnations, has educated children from its local community since 1931.

The school prides itself on being a truly diverse and welcoming Academy with a genuinely international perspective, whilst also being at the heart of their local community.

There is a Nursery overseen by the governing body, Ofsted inspected and reported on this provision separately, and in June 2022 the Nursery was judged to be Good in all areas, and Good overall.

== Notable former pupils ==
- Wayne Alexander, boxer
- Hannah Barrett, The X Factor 2013 contestant, 2007–2012
- Stuart Humphryes, film colouriser & photo enhancer, 1981–1986
- Dale Jasper, footballer
- Alan Judd, international recording and performing opera artist
- Jermaine McGlashan, footballer 2007–present
- Paul Oakenfold, record producer, DJ, remixer
- Fuse ODG, rapper, 1999–2004
- Wayne Routledge, footballer, 1996–2001
- Moses Swaibu, footballer, 2000–2005
- Carmaine Walker, England footballer, 2003–2004

== Headteachers ==
- S J Browning (Boys) (1931-?)
- W Hunt (Girls) (1931-?))
- James Harper (?–1977)
- Ronald Blackman (?–1983)
- Robert Pope (1983–1994)
- David Clark (1994–2014)
- Michael del Río (2014–2021)
- Simon Trehearn (2021–Present)
