= Castle Bottom NNR =

British national nature reserve

Coordinates: 51.330°N 0.857°W

Castle Bottom is a British national nature reserve located near Yateley in Hampshire. It is part of Castle Bottom to Yateley and Hawley Commons, which is a Site of Special Scientific Interest, and Thames Basin Heaths Special Protection Area for the conservation of wild birds

== Geography ==
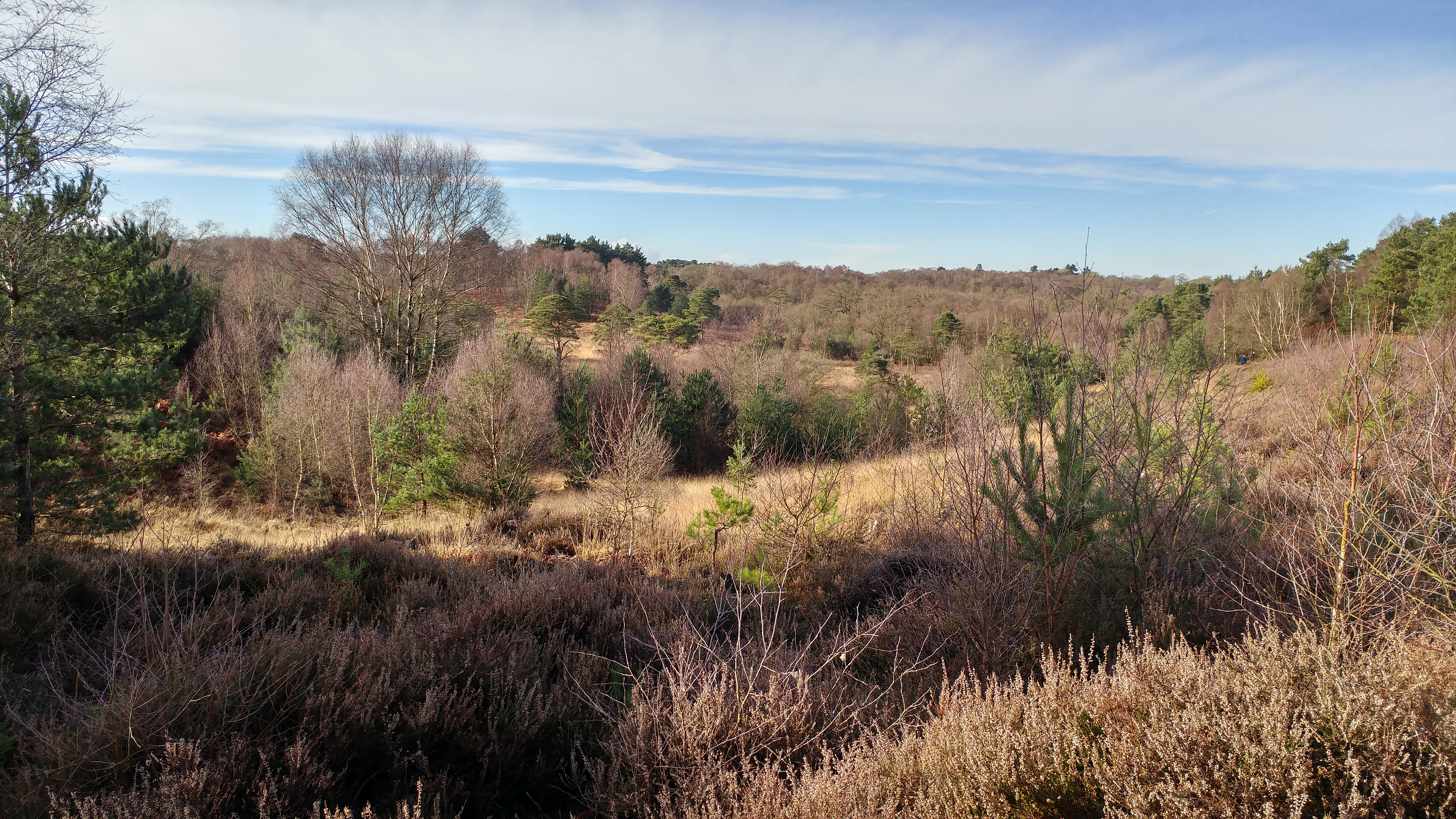
Castle bottom Nature reserve in February 2017

The nature reserve is situated south-west of Yateley and is on the north-west border of Blackbushe Airport. The reserve is a small lowland site of around 29 hectares (72 acres), containing two valley mires, with heathland and woodland habitats. Each of the valley mires has an acidic stream running through them.

== History ==
There is evidence that the area was used by humans as far back as 1800 to 550 BC, with discovery of some ancient burial mounds. There is evidence of banks being built in the Western Mire, but it is not possible to date exactly when they were built

The land was owned by the Bramshill estate until 1952, when it was sold. The land was last owned by a manufacturer of quarry equipment before the council purchased the site.

In the early 20th century two cottages were built on the north border of the reserve. Used until the 1960s, they are now ruins.

== Fauna ==
The nature reserve has the following fauna:

=== Mammals ===
- Exmoor pony
- European water vole
- European badger
- Common noctule
- Common pipistrelle

=== Birds ===
- African stonechat
- Woodlark
- European nightjar
- Dartford warbler
- Eurasian hobby
- Willow warbler
- Garden warbler
- Eurasian sparrowhawk
- Eurasian woodcock
- European turtle dove
- Lesser spotted woodpecker
- Tree pipit
- Song thrush
- Eurasian woodcock
- Goldcrest
- Common linnet
- Eurasian curlew
- Northern lapwing
- Common snipe
- Common swift
- Common kestrel

=== Invertebrates ===
- Dragonfly
- Damselfly
- Ectobius lapponicus
- Ectobius panzeri
- Silver-studded blue
- Myopa fasciata
- Chrysomela populi
- Large skipper
- Apatura iris
- Tethea or
- Pachycnemia hippocastanaria
- Polia hepatica
- Parascotia fuliginaria
- Ancylis upupana
- Eucosma conterminana
- Calamotropha paludella
- Crambus hamella
- Elaphria venustula
- Chrysis fulgida
- Symmorphus crassicornis
- European beewolf
- Andrena congruens
- Andrena florea
- Hydaticus seminiger
- Helochares punctatus
- Thomisus onustus
- Philodromus albidus
- Marpissa muscosa
- Aelurillus v-insignitus
- Xerolycosa nemoralis
- Zilla diodia
- Hypsosinga sanguinea

=== Reptiles, amphibians and other vertebrates ===
- Grass snake
- Vipera berus
- Viviparous lizard
- Anguis fragilis
- Common frog
- Common toad
- Brown trout

=== Fungi ===
- Morchella elata
- Typhula quisquiliaris
- Inonotus radiatus
- Schizophyllum commune
- Tricholoma cingulatum
- Panellus serotinus
- Lactarius pubescens
- Leccinum holopus
- Tremella foliacea
- Pisolithus arhizus

== Flora ==
The nature reserve has the following flora:

=== Trees ===
- Conifer
- Scots pine
- Silver Birch

=== Herbaceous plants ===
- Cuscuta epithymum
- Gnaphalium sylvaticum
- Hyacinthoides non-scripta
- Narthecium ossifragum
- Ulex minor
- Calluna
- Erica cinerea
- Erica tetralix
- Pteridium aquilinum
- Ulex europaeus
- Agrostis curtisii
- Moenchia erecta
- Botrychium lunaria
- Cirsium dissectum
- Myrica gale
- Rhynchospora alba
- Drosera rotundifolia
- Drosera intermedia
- Lysimachia tenella (syn. Anagallis tenella)
- Centaurium erythraea
- Lotus corniculatus
- Polygala
