= List of accidents and incidents involving the Vickers VC.1 Viking =

The Vickers VC.1 Viking was a British twin-engine short-range airliner derived from the Vickers Wellington bomber and built by Vickers-Armstrongs Limited at Brooklands near Weybridge in Surrey. In the aftermath of the Second World War, the Viking was an important airliner with British and several foreign airlines pending the development of turboprop aircraft like the Viscount.

Of the 163 aircraft built 55 aircraft were lost in accidents between 1946 and 1965 with a total of 343 fatalities. The highest number of fatalities (40) occurred in the 11 September 1963 crash of F-BJER of Airnautic.

Below is a list of accidents and incidents involving the Vickers VC.1 Viking, by date:

== 1940s ==
- 23 April 1945: The prototype G-AGOK was damaged beyond repair in a forced landing at Effingham, Surrey.
- 30 November 1946: T-1 of the Argentine Air Force crashed at El Palomar, Argentina.
- 2 September 1947: VL245 of the Royal Air Force King's Flight crashed at Dyce, Scotland.
- 17 September 1947: T-4 of the Argentine Air Force crashed at Aeroparque, Argentina.
- 29 December 1947: OY-DLI of DDL crashed into the sea on approach to Kastrup Airport, Copenhagen, Denmark.
- 6 January 1948: G-AHPK of British European Airways crashed at Ruislip while on approach to RAF Northolt.
- 6 February 1948: VT-CLY of Air India crashed at Bombay, India.
- 27 March 1948: VT-CEL of Indian National Airways flew into the side of Monte Cardo, Corsica in poor visibility killing all aboard.
- 5 April 1948: G-AIVP of British European Airways crashed following a collision with a Soviet Yak fighter over Berlin.
- 21 May 1948: G-AIVE of British European Airways crashed into the Irish Law mountain, Scotland, United Kingdom.
- 14 May 1948: LV-AFL of Flota Aerea Mercante Argentina was destroyed by fire after landing at Junin, Buenos Aires, Argentina.
- 8 October 1948: VT-CEJ of Indian National Airways was damaged beyond repair at New Delhi, India.
- 8 February 1949: OY-DLU of DDL crashed into the sea off Oresund, Denmark.
- 7 April 1949: VT-CIZ of Air India damaged beyond repair after landing with landing gear up on a beach at Marre, India.
- 13 June 1949: YI-ABR of Iraqi Airways was damaged beyond repair when it landed with its landing gear up at Baghdad Airport, Iraq.

== 1950s ==
- 13 April 1950: G-AIVL Vigilant of British European Airways was badly damaged by a bomb that detonated in the rear toilet compartment, but managed to safely land back at Northolt, with pilot Captain Ian Harvey being awarded the George Medal. The aircraft was later repaired and returned to service with BEA.
- 27 September 1950: T-8 of the Argentine Air Force was destroyed by fire at El Palomar, Argentina.
- 31 October 1950: G-AHPN of British European Airways crashed in fog at London Heathrow Airport.
- 8 May 1951: G-AHPD of Hunting Air Travel was damaged beyond repair after a force landing at Beutre, France.
- 11 November 1951: T-80 of the Argentine Air Forced crashed at Moron Air Base, Argentina.
- 17 February 1952: G-AHPI of Hunting Air Travel crashed into Monte la Cinta, Scilly, Italy en route from Nice to Malta killing all aboard.
- 25 July 1952: G-AHON of Crewsair was damaged beyond repair after a heavy landing at Luqa, Malta.
- 19 August 1952: VL266 of the Royal Air Force crashed.
- 27 October 1952: T-64 of the Argentine Air Force crashed at Moron Air Base, Argentina. This aircraft (ex LV-XFM) was used as Presidential aircraft 1948-1952.
- 5 January 1953: G-AJDL of British European Airways crashed at Nutts Corner, Belfast, Northern Ireland.
- 29 March 1953: VP-YEY of Central African Airlines crashed at Mkwaya, Tanganyika.
- 9 June 1953: T-6 of the Argentine Air Force crashed at Praderes, Buenos Aires, Argentina.
- 12 August 1953: G-AIVG of British European Airways was damaged beyond repair at Le Bourget Airport, Paris, France.
- 15 December 1953: SU-AFK of Misrair crashed neat Almaza Airport, Cairo, Egypt.
- 20 December 1953: G-AHPO of Eagle Aviation was damaged beyond repair when it overran the runway Nuremberg, West Germany.
- 15 August 1954: G-AIXS of Airwork crashed after stalling on approach to Blackbushe Airport, England, United Kingdom.
- 15 September 1954: SU-AFO of Misrair crashed at Almaza Airport, Cairo, Egypt.
- 28 June 1956: T-5 of the Argentine Air Force crashed at Resistencia, Argentina.
- 10 October 1955: YI-ABQ of Iraqi Airways crashed on take off from Baghdad Airport, Iraq.
- 5 October 1956: VP-YMO of Central African Airways crashed on take off from Salisbury Airport, Southern Rhodesia.
- November 1956: VK-500 of the Arab Legion Air Force crashed at Aquaba, Turkey.
- 11 January 1957: T-11 of the Argentine Air Force crashed at Aeroparque, Argentina.
- 1 May 1957: G-AJBO of Eagle Aviation crashed at Star Hill near Blackbushe Airport, Hampshire, United Kingdom, 34 of the 35 on board killed.
- 13 May 1957: T-3 of the Argentine Air Force crashed at San Carlos des Barlioche, Argentina.
- 26 September 1957: D-CADA operated by Karl Herfurtner was damaged beyond repair at San Bonet, Palma, Majorca.
- 7 March 1958: SU-AGN of Misrair crashed at Menzalah Lake, Port Said, Egypt.
- 26 April 1958: G-AGRT of Eagle Aviation was destroyed by fire on the ground at El Adam, Libya.
- 2 September 1958: G-AIJE of Independent Air Travel crashed after take-off at London Heathrow Airport.
- 17 October 1958: D-BELA of Deutsche Flugdienst force landed at Zele, Belgium and was damaged beyond repair.
- 28 July 1958: G-AHPH of East Anglian Flying Services, damaged beyond repair when the landing gear collapsed during landing at Southend Airport.
- 7 August 1959: T-92 of the Argentine Air Force crashed at El Polmar Air Force Base, Argentina.
- 5 September 1959: F-BFDN of Airnautic flying from Athens to Bastia Airport crashed into the sea off Southern Corsica.
- 22 December 1959: G-AMGG of Eagle Aviation was damaged beyond repair at Agadir, Morocco.

== 1960s ==
- 29 May 1960: G-AHOR of Air Safaris was damaged beyond repair after landing with the landing gear up at Tarbes, France.
- 24 August 1960: G-AMNK of Don Everall (Aviation) lost an engine on takeoff and crashed into the sea at Heraklion, Crete, Greece.
- 4 February 1961: D-BALI of LTU Lufttransport-Unternehmen was damaged beyond repair on take off from Düsseldorf, West Germany.
- 9 August 1961: G-AHPM of Cunard Eagle Airways crashed into Mount Holtheia in Norway.
- 14 August 1961: G-AJCE of Independent Air Travel was damaged beyond repair after it forced landed at Lyon, France.
- 11 September 1963: F-BJER of Airnautic crashed in the Pyrenees, France.
- 8 February 1965: F-BJEP of Airnautic was damaged beyond repair when the landing gear collapsed during take off at Calvi, Corsica.
- 2 August 1965: G-AHPL of Invicta Airlines was damaged beyond repair on landing at RAF Manston, Kent.
