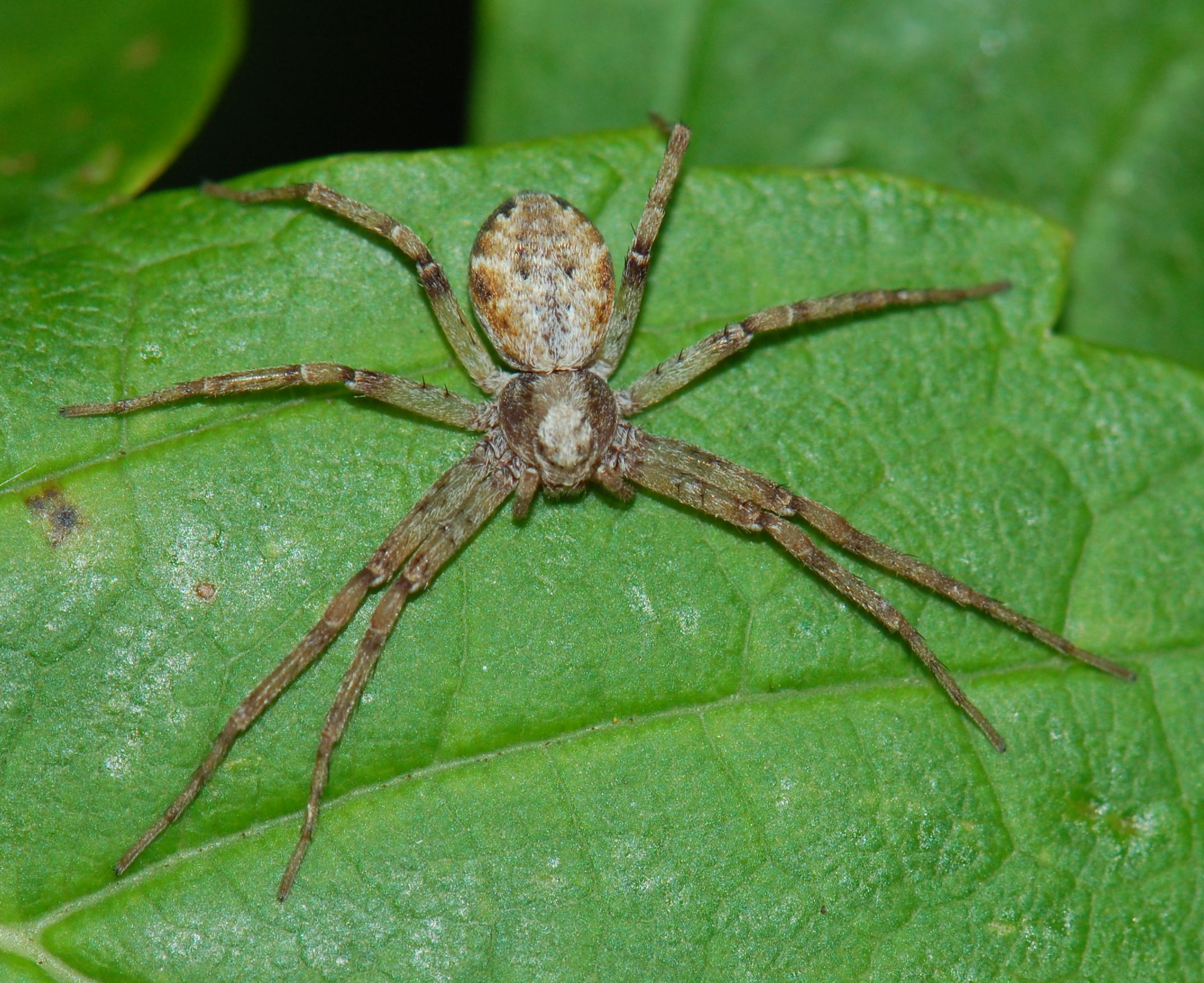

Scientific classification
- Kingdom: Animalia
- Phylum: Arthropoda
- Subphylum: Chelicerata
- Class: Arachnida
- Order: Araneae
- Infraorder: Araneomorphae
- Family: Philodromidae
- Genus: Philodromus
- Species: P. cespitum

Binomial name
- Philodromus cespitum (Walckenaer, 1802)

= Philodromus cespitum =

Species of spider

Philodromus cespitum is a species of running crab spider in the family Philodromidae. It is found in North America, Europe, North Africa, and parts of the Middle East and Asia. Philodromus cespitum is a foliage-dweller, and is the most abundant species found in European fruit orchards. It acts as a biological control by preying on orchard pests. A diurnal ambush hunter, it preys on aphids, insects, and occasionally competitor spider species. Males court females by tapping on the females’ bodies with their forelegs. They then insert a genital plug into the female during copulation. Unlike in many other spider species, subsequent males can mate with plugged females by removing part of the plug prior to copulation. Males discriminate among females based on virginity and plug size, and can determine these factors using the females’ draglines and plug samples.

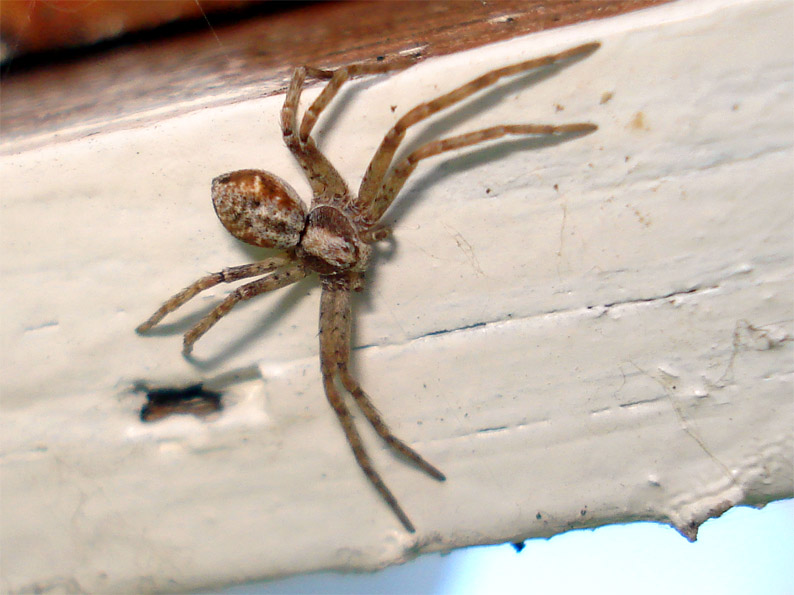

== Description ==
Males of this species are approximately 3.5-5.0 mm long, and females are about 5.3 mm long. Body color is variable, mostly in shades of brown or yellow. Spots are also a common body pattern. Males tend to have more spots than females. Legs are usually yellowish brown or grey. Some members of the species also have spots on their legs. Males of the species have a noticeably asymmetric sperm duct. Male pedipalps contain nerve tissue and a sensory organ.

== Phylogeny ==
Philodromus cespitum belongs to the Philodromus aureolus species complex. It is the only species in this group that is Holarctic. Since different species in this group are distinguished by copulatory organs that are only fully visible when mature, spiderlings of different species in the group are difficult to tell apart.

Philodromus lividus and Philodromus longipalpis were originally thought to be subspecies of P. cespitum. Since no evidence was found to place them in the subspecific category, they were made their own species. Males of P. lividus and P. cespitum have differently shaped sperm ducts. Female P. longipalpis have a larger median plate and atrium of the epigyne than P. cespitum.

Philodromus fuscolimbatus, another species in the Philodromus aureolus species group, was also originally thought to be a subspecies of P. cespitum. However, the two species can be differentiated by the shapes of their sperm ducts. Sympatry occurs between P. cespitum and P. fuscolimbatus in the northern Alps, a region where the two species overlap.

Philodromus cespitum can also coexist with related species Philodromus albidus and Philodromus aureolus in the same geographic area. They accomplish this by occupying different trophic and habitat niches.

Females of the species Philodromus buchari very closely resemble females of P. cespitum, although P. buchari are slightly larger.

Neural arrangement in the pedipalps of male cave spiders Hickmana troglodytes is almost identical to the neural arrangement in the pedipalps of male P. cespitum.

== Habitat and distribution ==
Philodromus cespitum is a foliage-dweller, and is the dominant species found in Central European fruit orchards. It is more highly concentrated in orchard centers than edges. Larger individuals are found in the center and smaller individuals are found around the edges. This species is also found in cotton fields. Its distribution extends across North America, Europe, North Africa, Turkey, Russia, Kazakhstan, China, Korea, and Japan. Adult females are most commonly observed in June and July. Spiderlings are present year-round but are most abundant from August to October.

== Activity ==
Males are more active during the day than females, and females are more active at dawn and dusk. Both sexes show locomotor activity indicative of a twenty-four hour circadian rhythm cycle. However, the exact effect of these circadian rhythms on locomotion differs between males and females. Females also possess a secondary twelve hour cycle.

== Diet ==
Philodromus cespitum are diurnal hunters. They capture their prey mainly through ambush. They feed on insects and spiders found in fruit orchards, such as aphids, the pest Cacopsylla pyri, and Theridion spiders. They sometimes engage in intraguild predation, in which they feed on competitor species as well as smaller prey. A diet of both competitor spiders and aphids increases the overall fitness of P. cespitum. However, since the costs are high due to retaliation and risk of injury from the competitor spider, intraguild predation does not often occur.

Foraging aggressiveness in P. cespitum can sometimes lead to overkilling, where the organism kills more prey than it can consume. Aggressiveness in this species is positively correlated with size and capture success. Aggressiveness also significantly increases the probability of intraguild predation.

== Reproduction and life cycle ==
Females lay around 250 eggs and construct five to seven egg cocoons. Females build egg cocoons during oviposition. The number of eggs laid is not affected by changes in temperature. The number of larvae that hatch decreases after the third egg cocoon built.

The time from oviposition to hatching is 20 days at 15 °C and 10 days at 24 °C. The developmental time of nymph-stages is about 430 days. Developmental time is longer for females than for males regardless of temperature.

Females of this species tend to live longer than males. The lifespan of both sexes in a laboratory setting is shorter when housed together than when individually housed.

== Mating ==
=== Courtship ===
A male will initiate courtship by tapping the female’s body with his forelegs. Males who have a proportionally larger femur length in comparison to the females they are courting perform more taps than mating pairs who have a more similar ratio. The female may first run away and push away the male’s forelegs with her own legs. The male pursues the female until she stops moving and then taps continuously as he climbs over her body. The male then enters the mating position, in which he faces towards the tip of the female’s opisthosoma. He inserts one of his pedipalps into one of the female’s copulatory organs and transfers sperm and genital plug material via the pedipalp. The female ends the copulation by shaking her body to dislodge the male. The male then attempts to restart the courtship process and mount the female again. The female will either allow him to mount again or will shake him off until he ceases the behavior. Females normally allow the male to engage in two to three rounds of courtship and copulation.

=== Genital plugs ===
Male spiders plug female genitalia when transferring sperm during copulation. The plugs are stored in the males’ genital bulb and they are amorphous. Since they do not have a complicated shape or structure, genital plugs are low cost for the male to produce. Plug size and quality are positively correlated with the number of times that the male taps the female’s body during courtship.

Genital plugs are made up of a mixture of compressed vesicles and spermatozoa. They extend halfway into the copulatory duct, with the other half being filled with only spermatozoa.

In many species, genital plugging prevents copulation with future males. In P. cespitum, however, males can mate even with fully plugged females by removing some of the plugs prior to mating. Females may determine the amount of plug material that a male deposits by choosing when to end the copulation. The amount of material deposited increases with increasing duration of female haematodocha expansion.

When males are mated with females who already possess plugs rather than virgin females, the females tend to be more aggressive. They will often bite the males’ legs during courtship, and sperm transfer occurs less frequently. However, males are usually able to remove some of the plug material and mate with the female. Since the male must expend energy removing the plug and is not able to transfer as much sperm, this benefits the male who originally plugged the female. This may explain why plugs are still produced even though they can be removed by a future male.

=== Male mate choice ===
Males discriminate and prefer silk draglines from virgin females over mated females. They also prefer virgin females and mated females with small plugs to mated females with large plugs because they do not need to expend as much energy on removing the plug and will be able to transfer more sperm when copulating.

== Enemies ==
Parasitism by organisms such as the small-headed fly Ogcodes fumatus can sometimes occur. The observed rate of parasitism in P. cespitum is 2.5%. Philodromus cespitum exhibit abnormal web-building behaviors prior to the emergence of the larva parasite. Chrysoperla carnea and Coccinella septempunctata are natural enemies of P. cespitum.

== Interactions with humans and livestock ==
Philodromus cespitum acts as a biological control agent by feeding on pests in fruit orchards. Because fruit orchards are one of the main habitats of P. cespitum, they are affected by the insecticides sprayed against the pests that they consume. They exhibit different prey preferences when in the presence of insecticides. This may be due to an impaired sensory system, taste, or mobility as a result of the insecticides.

Insecticides also increase the foraging aggressiveness of P. cespitum. This may be due to reduced prey availability or behavioral changes as a result of altered internal states or gene expression.

Insecticides can also be harmful to P. cespitum, with different types causing different mortality rates, ranging from 0 to 80%. Since these spiders are beneficial to farmers in that they consume fruit orchard pests, insecticides that cause a lower mortality rate can work in conjunction with the spider to eliminate pests.

Philodromus cespitum also acts as an important biological control in Chinese and Iranian cotton fields by preying on cotton pests.

=== Neonicotinoids ===
Neonicotinoids are typically effective in pest control, yet spiders are less sensitive to them given the altered structure of their acetylcholine receptors where the neonicotinoids bind selectively. Imidacloprid has quite severe effects with partial lethality after an hour. Acetamiprid has sublethal effects which are higher when the chemical is applied on the dorsal side. More males than females either are paralyzed or die with the dorsal application of neonicotinoids. This finding is consistent not only with P. cespitum but also with other prevalent spider families.
