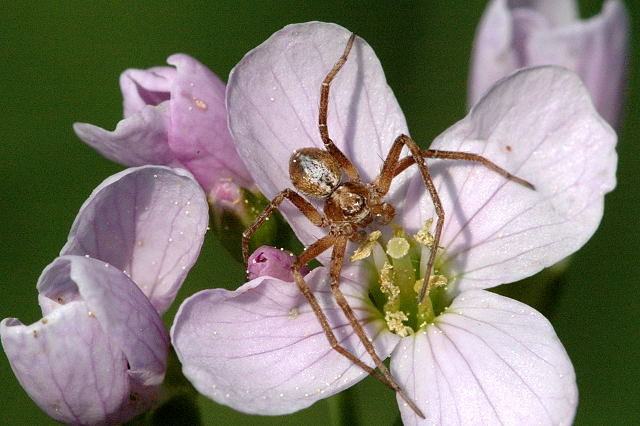
- Female

Scientific classification
- Kingdom: Animalia
- Phylum: Arthropoda
- Subphylum: Chelicerata
- Class: Arachnida
- Order: Araneae
- Infraorder: Araneomorphae
- Family: Philodromidae
- Genus: Philodromus
- Species: P. aureolus

Binomial name
- Philodromus aureolus (Clerck, 1757)

Synonyms
- Araneus aureolus Clerck, 1757; Aranea quadrilineata Martini & Goeze, 1778.; Aranea aureola (Clerck, 1757); Thomisus aureolus (Clerck, 1757); Philodromus affinis Wider, 1834; Philodromus politus Simon, 1870

= Philodromus aureolus =

Species of spider

Philodromus aureolus, the wandering crab spider, is a mainly European running crab spider of the family Philodromidae. The taxonomy of the species group named after Philodromus aureolus is in a state of flux and a number of new species have recently been recognised.

== Description ==
The prosoma often has a broad bright median band, which is plain. The legs are yellowish grey or brown with dark spots. The opisthosoma is very variably coloured, brown or yellowish brown, mostly spotted with bright median band and often with a dark cardiac mark that reaches the second pair of sigillae, and with dark chevrons. The male often more intensely patterned, although sometimes males may be plain dark brown. The body length of a male is 3.5-6.5 mm, that of females 4–8.5 mm.

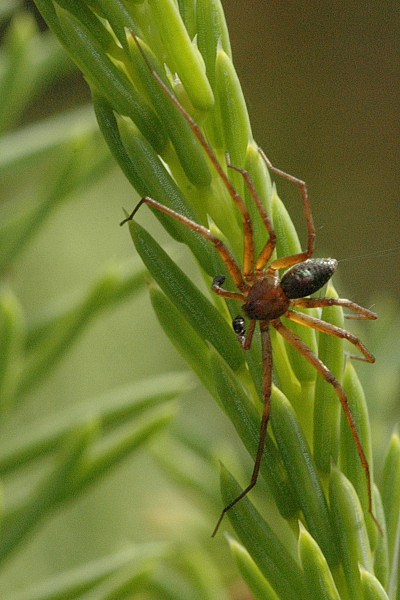
male

== Biology ==
Philodromus aureolus hunts by relying on camouflage, stealth and speed to hunt prey. The males are bright green, the females lighterer in colour and it is thought that they can change colour to match their background, as is the case some other members of the Philodromus group. They sit and wait on the leaves of bushes and trees to catch any prey that comes into reach. They can also move very rapidly to chase prey down too. This speed can also be used to escape danger. The female uses silk to draw leaves together to form shelters to protect the sacs containing the eggs.

Philodromus aureolus probably over-winters among the leaf litter that accumulates in various woodland situations. The adults of both sexes occur mainly in early to mid-summer.

== Habitat ==
Philodromus aureolus is usually found in sunny places on herbs, bushes and trees. This spider is found in broad-leaved, mixed and coniferised woods, thickets, hedgerows and scrub. It often enters houses and is often encountered on walls. Although occasionally found on older trees, P. aureolus is more often found on younger trees, both broad-leaved and coniferous.

== Distribution ==
Philodromus aureolus is widespread in western and central Europe, including Ireland. The species is widespread in most of Britain but is more localised in the west and north. However the true distribution is probably obscured by the complex taxonomy of the Philodromus aureolus group.

== Taxonomic status ==
The separation of species and their identification in the aureolus group of the genus Philodromus within the family Philodromidae has always been difficult. In early faunal works many more taxa were named than were acknowledged 50 years later. This "lumping" probably came about because of the intraspecific variation in pattern and colours, the overall similarity of the genital organs and their sympatric occurrence. For example, material identified by Eugène Simon as a single species of this complex, was recently shown to be not less than four separate species. In northern and central Europe this difficult taxonomy and the complexity of the group mean that cryptic species may remain undetected. Philodromus aureolus, Philodromus buxi, Philodromus cespitum, Philodromus collinus, Philodromus longipalpis and Philodromus praedatus have all been named as species within this complex that occur in Europe, with other species in the Mediterranean region.

== Gallery ==
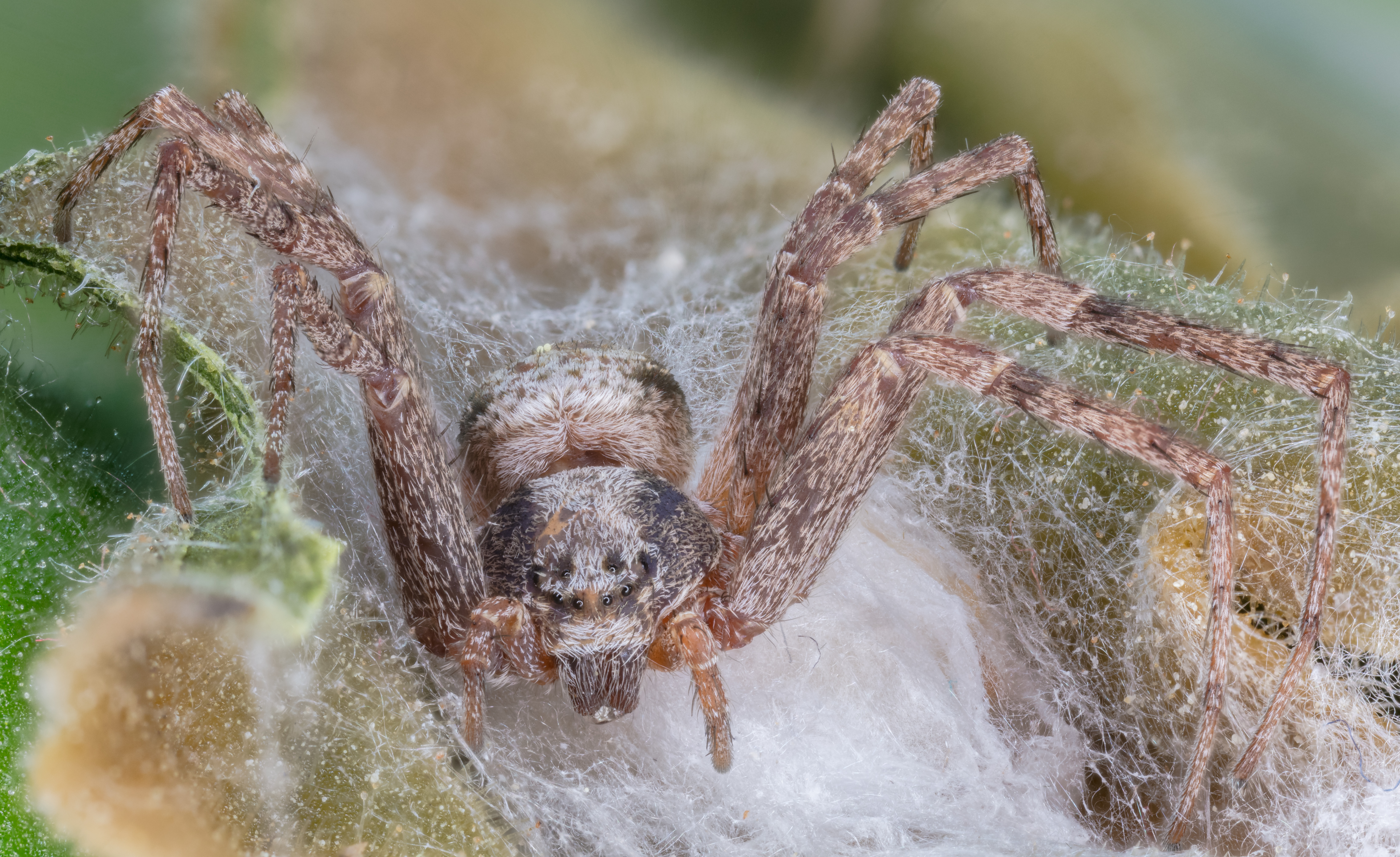

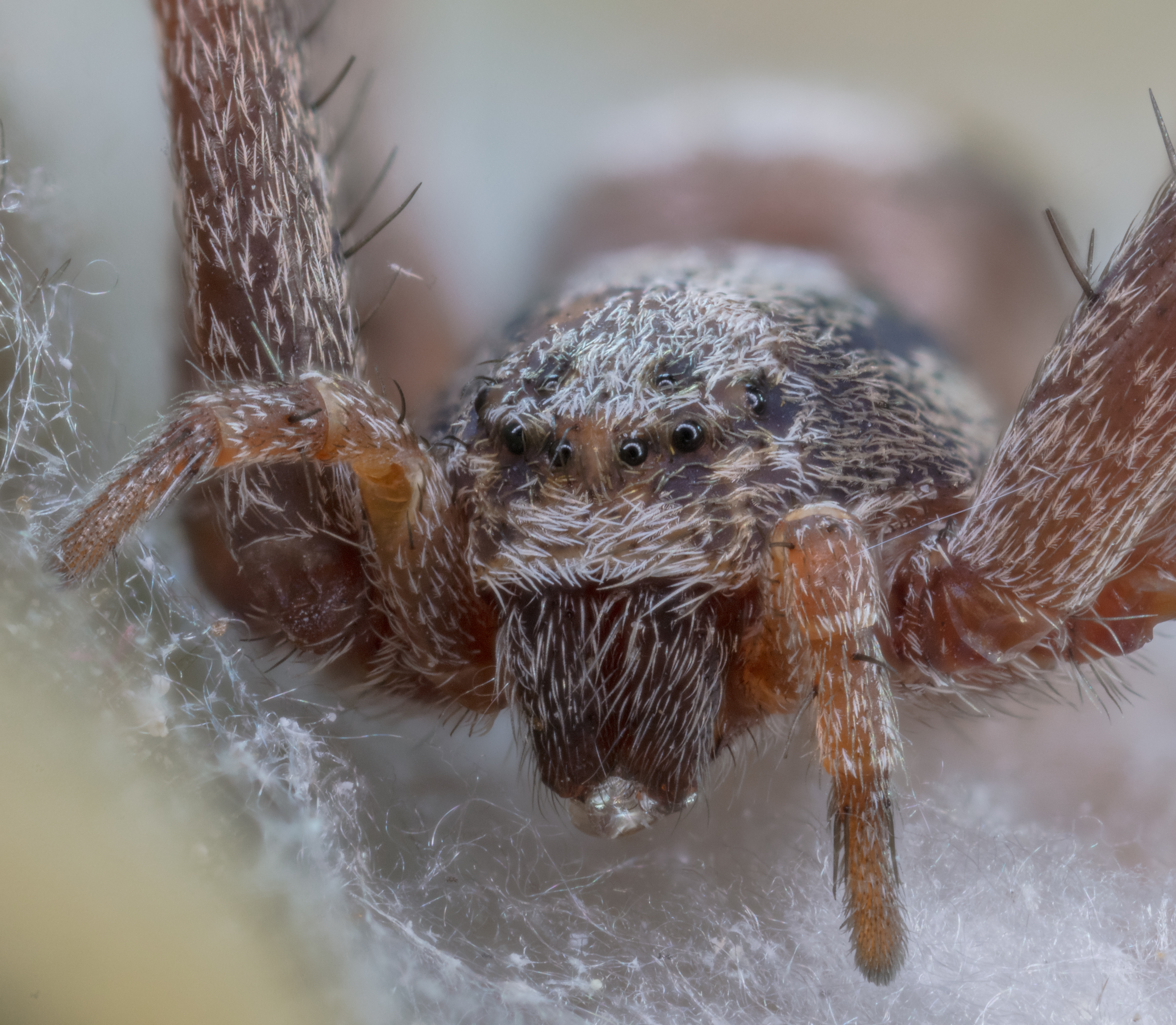

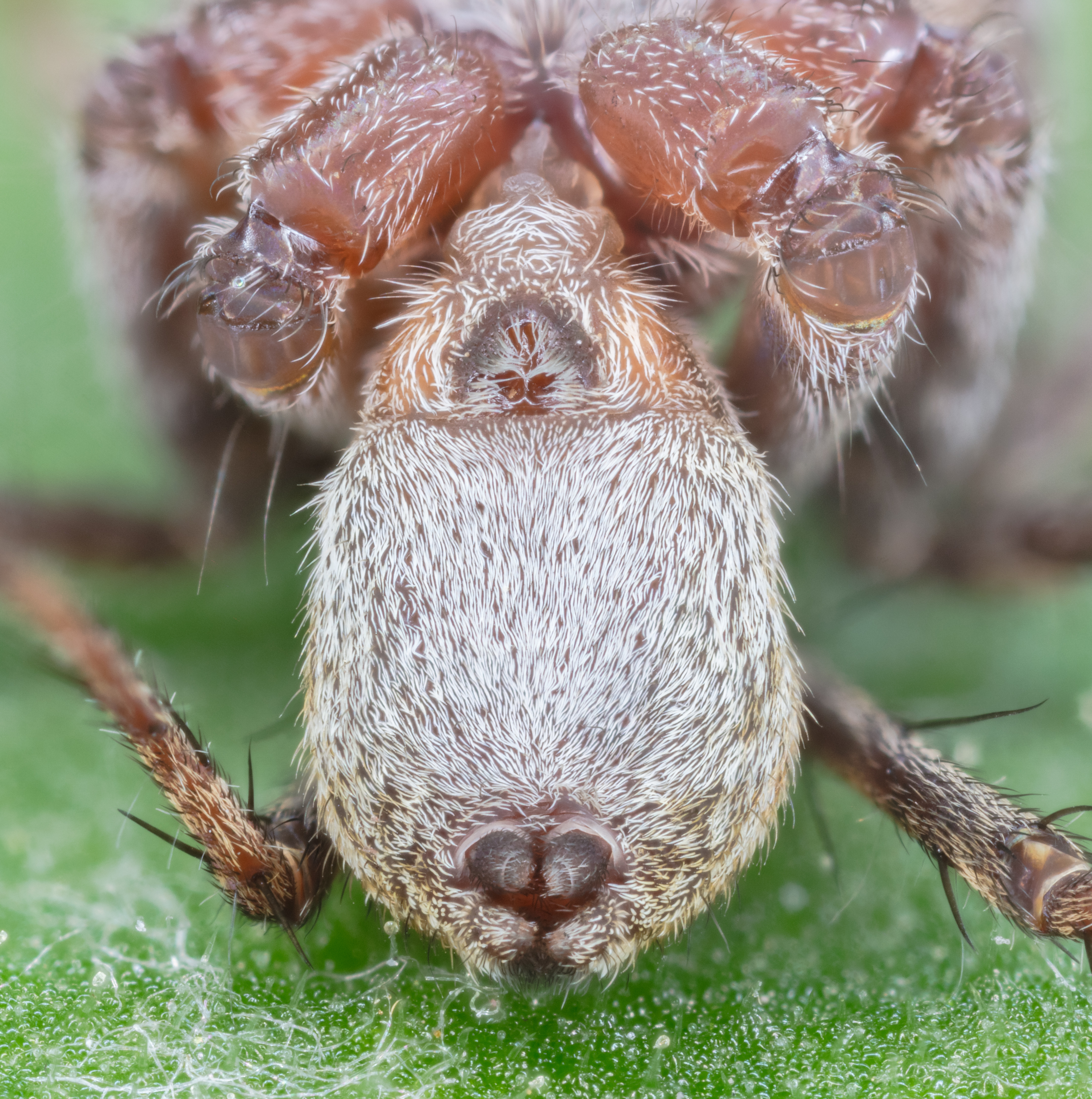

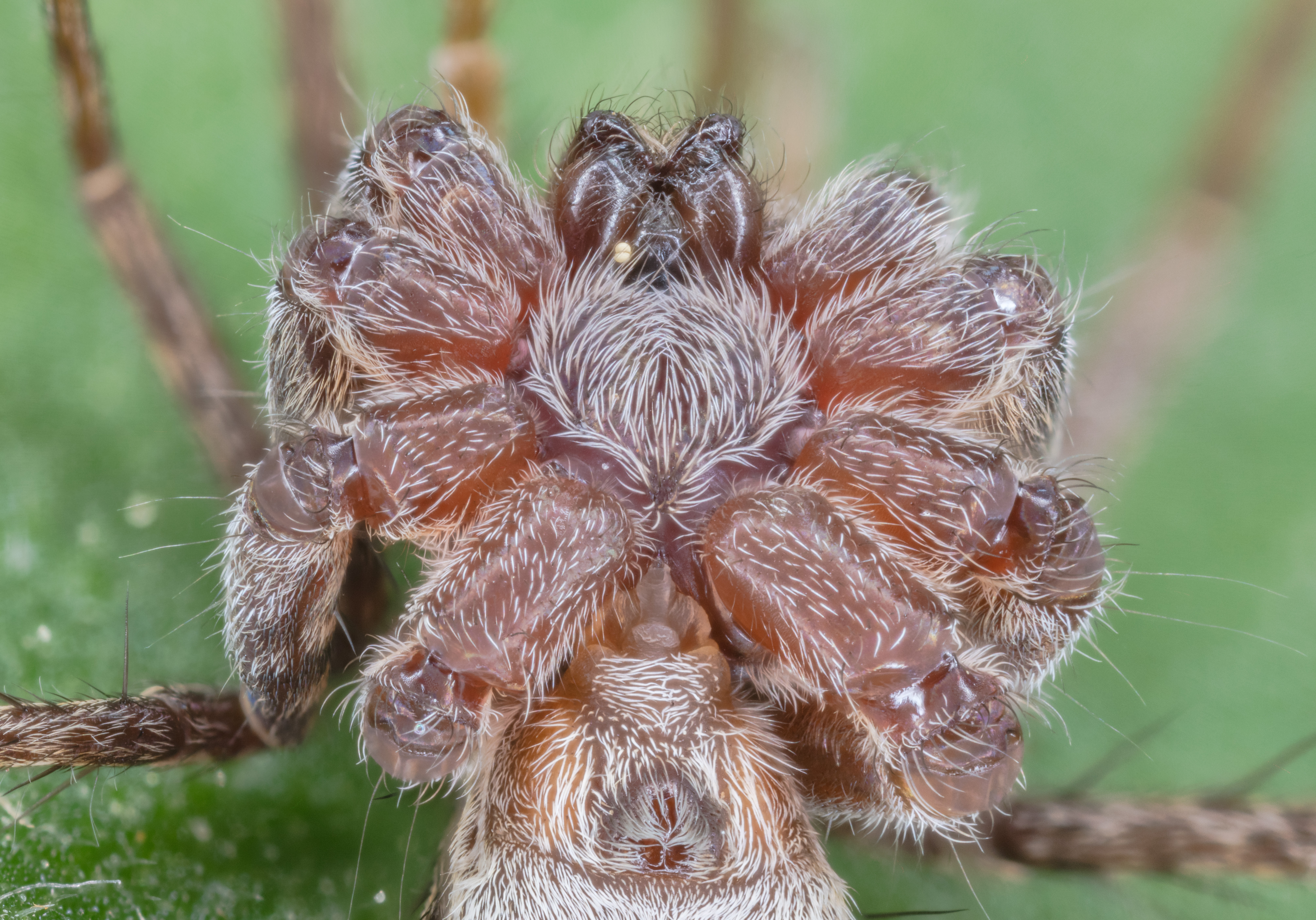
