= Blink (airline) =

British private jet airline (2007–2008)

IATA	ICAO	Call sign
—	BKK	BLINKAIR
- Founded: July 2007; 19 years ago
- Ceased operations: July 2018; 8 years ago
- Hubs: Geneva; Guernsey; Jersey; London–Blackbushe; Paris–Le Bourget
- Secondary hubs: Nice; Zürich
- Focus cities: Western Europe
- Fleet size: 15
- Destinations: 600+
- Headquarters: Blackbushe Airport, Surrey, England
- Key people: Patrick Hersent (CEO); John Jackson (Director of Flight Operations); Martin Lewis (Chief Training Captain); Patrick Marchant (Head of Engineering); Cameron Ogden (co-founder); Peter Leiman (co-founder)
- Website: www.flyblink.com

Blink was a British commercial aviation operation that provided private jet travel using Cessna Citation Mustang very light jets. The company began operations in London in May 2008. Its French parent company, Wijet, placed it in administration in July 2018.

== History ==
Blink Limited was founded by Peter Leiman and Cameron Ogden, who met at Harvard Business School. Ogden is the son of Sir Peter Ogden, the founder of Computacenter. Leiman is a former investment banker. Four former British Airways executives are involved in operations.

In May 2015 Blink announced the acquisition of MyJet, a Genoa-based operator, with three Cessna Citation Mustang aircraft. This increased Blink's fleet size to nine aircraft. The acquisition also included a maintenance facility at Genoa Airport.

In October 2016, it was announced that the French Mustang operator Wijet had acquired Blink. This increased the combined fleet to 16. In July 2018, the company went into administration.

== Fleet and services ==
The company used a fleet of thirteen Cessna Citation Mustang aircraft to provide on-demand private jet travel. Its fleet of cheaper and lighter aircraft allowed the company to provide services at a lower cost versus traditional private jet operators. The jets seat four passengers and travel to destinations in Western Europe.
