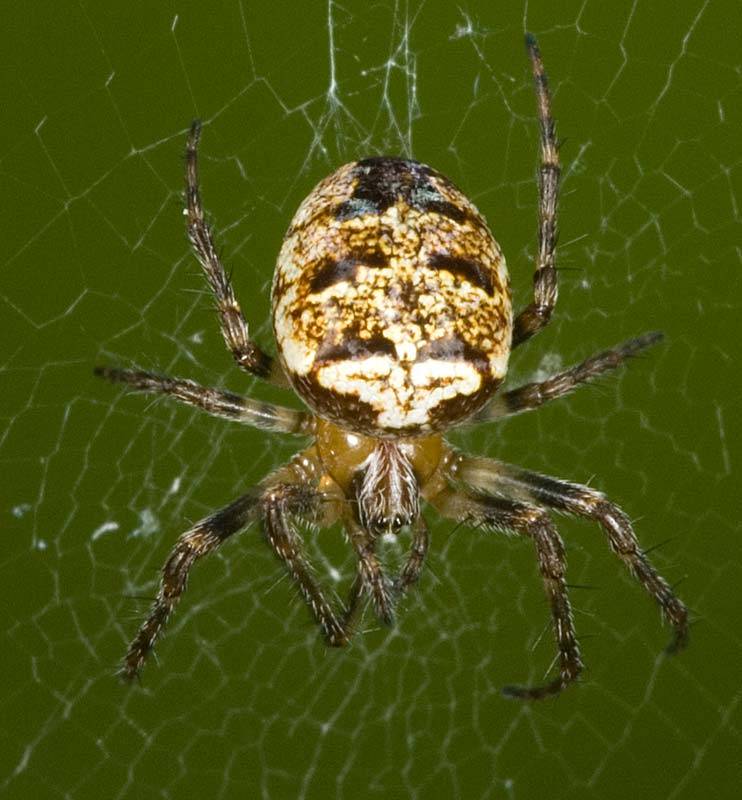
- Z. diodia in net, female

Scientific classification
- Kingdom: Animalia
- Phylum: Arthropoda
- Subphylum: Chelicerata
- Class: Arachnida
- Order: Araneae
- Infraorder: Araneomorphae
- Family: Araneidae
- Genus: Zilla; C. L. Koch, 1834

Type species
- Z. diodia (Walckenaer, 1802)

Species
- 4, see text

= Zilla (spider) =

Zilla Temporal range: Palaeogene–present

Genus of spiders

Zilla is a genus of orb-weaver spiders first described by C. L. Koch in 1834.

== Species ==
As of January 2026, this genus includes four species:

- Zilla crownia Yin, Xie & Bao, 1996 – China
- Zilla diodia (Walckenaer, 1802) – North Africa, Europe, Turkey, Caucasus, Russia (Europe, West Siberia), Iran
- Zilla globosa Saha & Raychaudhuri, 2004 – India
- Zilla qinghaiensis Hu, 2001 – China
