= Wijet =

French air taxi airline (2009–2019)

IATA	ICAO	Call sign
-	-	-
- Founded: 2009; 17 years ago HEC Paris, France
- Ceased operations: 16 December 2019
- Operating bases: Paris–Le Bourget Airport
- Fleet size: 3 (August 2019)
- Destinations: ~1,200 airports in Europe and North Africa
- Headquarters: Paris, France
- Key people: Corentin Denœud (co-founder, CEO 2009–2016); Alexandre Azoulay (co-founder); Patrick Hersent (CEO 2016–2018)

Wijet LLC was a French air taxi airline founded in 2009 at HEC Paris by Corentin Denœud and Alexandre Azoulay, together with two former French Air Force and Naval Aviation pilots, Jean-François Hochenauer and Frédéric Daubresse. A pioneer of flat-rate per-flight-hour pricing for private jet charter in Europe, the company became one of the world's largest operators of the Cessna Citation Mustang. Wijet was placed in judicial liquidation on 16 December 2019.

== History ==
Wijet operated as a "jet taxi" company using a fixed price per flight hour.

More than 85 investors participated in the company's initial funding. In total, Wijet raised US$23 million in investment from its creation in 2009.

In 2014, Air France began offering Wijet's private jets. In September 2016, Wijet acquired Blink, then Britain's largest air taxi company, with the stated goal of creating "the world's largest air taxi company"; the merged entity was reported to have an enterprise value of €45 million. Wijet's own French operating licence lapsed on 15 December 2016, and Patrick Hersent replaced Corentin Denœud as head of the company.

The Blink acquisition proved unsuccessful. The UK subsidiary was found never to have been profitable, burdened by an ageing fleet and a cost structure ill-suited to on-demand air charter, and integration difficulties were compounded by uncertainty surrounding Brexit. On 1 July 2018, Wijet announced it was relinquishing its British air operator's certificate and halting the operations of its British subsidiaries, and Patrick Hersent left the company.

Wijet then changed its business model, ceasing to be a full-fledged airline with its own air operator's certificate, operations and maintenance management. The company retained ownership of its aircraft, but flights were operated on its behalf under the Luxembourg flag by Flying Group, a European private aviation operator — an outsourced-operations model similar to that used by Wheels Up in the United States. As part of its restructuring, Wijet voluntarily entered French safeguard proceedings on 8 August 2018.

Wijet stopped accepting reservations in late 2019, and a French court ordered the judicial liquidation of the company on 16 December 2019.

== Fleet ==
From 2010 to 2018, the fleet consisted exclusively of four-seat Cessna Citation Mustang aircraft. At its peak Wijet operated 15 Mustangs, making it one of the world's oldest and largest operators of the type.

To improve operational performance, Wijet ordered 16 Honda HA-420 HondaJet aircraft, valued at US$78 million, announced at the Singapore Airshow in February 2018 — at the time a record order for the type, making Wijet the worldwide launch airline for the HondaJet. The first aircraft, registered LX-WJA, was delivered on 20 March 2019 and operated from the company's Paris–Le Bourget headquarters. The HondaJet seats five passengers, consumes less fuel, and is both faster and more comfortable than the Mustang, with a range about 300 nmi (560 km) longer, putting several Nordic and North African destinations within reach.

As of August 2019, the Wijet fleet consisted of the following aircraft:

Wijet fleet
Aircraft	In service	Orders	Passengers	Notes
Cessna Citation Mustang	—	—	4	Sole type from 2010 to 2018
Honda HA-420 HondaJet	3	16	4	
Total	3	16		

== Base ==
The fleet was based at Paris–Le Bourget Airport.

== See also ==
- Air taxi
- List of defunct airlines of France
- Wheels Up
