= Castle Bottom to Yateley and Hawley Commons =

UK Site of Special Scientific Interest

Coordinates: 51.231°N 0.828°W

- Site of Special Scientific Interest
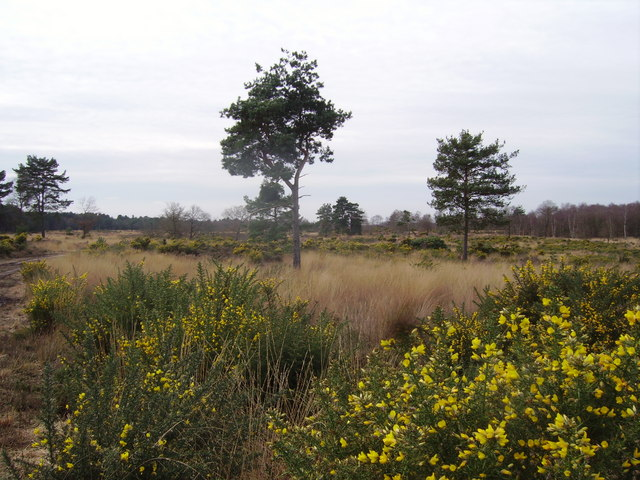
- Yateley Common
- Location of Castle Bottom to Yateley and Hawley Commons.
- Area of search: Hampshire
- Grid reference: SU 818 586
- Interest: Biological
- Area: 922.7 hectares (2,280 acres)
- Notification date: 1993
- Location map: Magic Map

Castle Bottom to Yateley and Hawley Commons is a 922.7-hectare (2,280-acre) biological Site of Special Scientific Interest north of Fleet in Hampshire. It is part of Thames Basin Heaths Special Protection Area for the conservation of wild birds and an area of 30.8 hectares (76 acres) is designated a national nature reserve called Castle Bottom.

This site of heathland and conifer plantation has an internationally important population of Dartford warbler and populations of two other protected birds, woodlark and nightjar. It also has an outstanding assemblage of dragonflies and damselflies, with 19 out of the 37 British species. Other invertebrates include the nationally rare conopid fly, Myopa fasciata.
