= 1950 Heathrow BEA Vickers Viking crash =

Aviation accident in London, England

Coordinates: 51°28′33″N 0°28′0″W

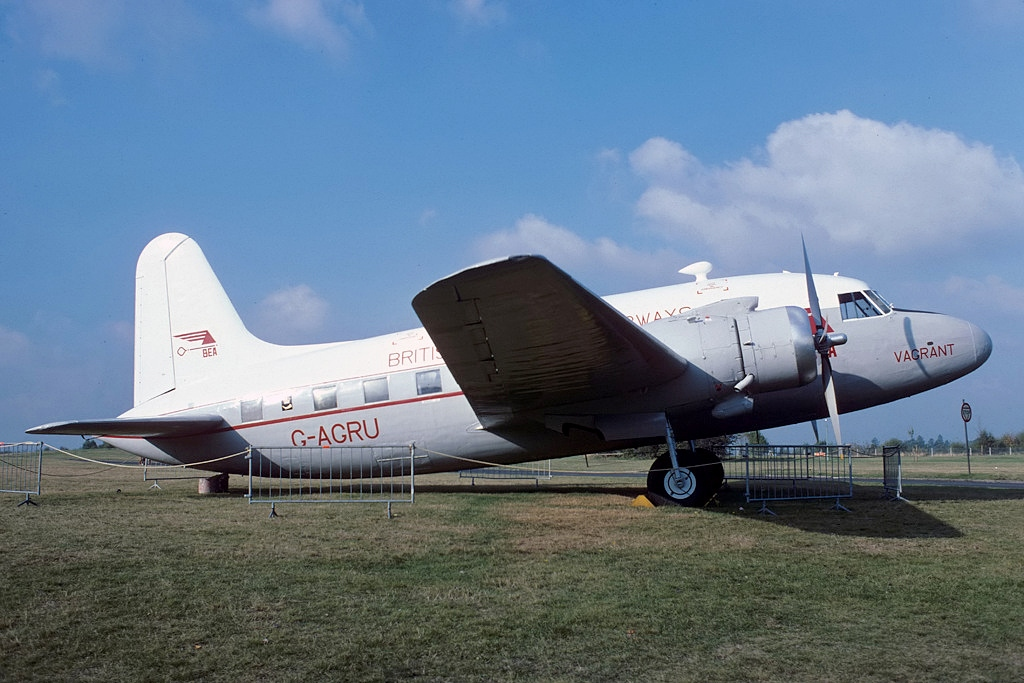
- A preserved Vickers VC.1 Viking, similar to the accident aircraft

Accident
- Date: 31 October 1950
- Summary: Crash during attempted landing in thick fog
- Site: London Heathrow Airport London, England

Aircraft
- Aircraft type: Vickers VC.1 Viking
- Aircraft name: Lord St Vincent
- Operator: British European Airways
- Registration: G-AHPN
- Flight origin: Paris Le Bourget Airport; Paris, France
- Destination: Northolt Airport; London, England
- Occupants: 30
- Passengers: 26
- Crew: 4
- Fatalities: 28
- Injuries: 2
- Survivors: 2

The 1950 Heathrow BEA Vickers Viking crash occurred on 31 October 1950 when a Vickers Viking operated by British European Airways (BEA) crashed at London Heathrow Airport, originally named London Airport at the time of the crash. in heavy fog. The aircraft was on a scheduled flight between Paris and London's Northolt airport and 28 of the 30 passengers and crew on board were killed.

== Accident ==
At 6.39 pm on the evening of the accident, a Vickers VC.1 Viking twin-engined airliner of BEA (registered G-AHPN and named Lord St Vincent) took off from Le Bourget Airport in Paris on a scheduled flight to Northolt airport, London with a crew of four and 26 passengers. A weather forecast obtained before the flight took off had warned of poor visibility, and about 45 minutes after departure as the aircraft neared London, British air traffic control (ATC) informed the pilot that fog had reduced the visibility at Northolt to 50 yd (46 m). On receiving this information, the pilot announced that he would attempt to land at London Airport instead. Although visibility at London Airport was only 40 yd (37 m), it had the facilities for a Ground-controlled approach (GCA, i.e. a "talkdown" by radar operators). The pilot told ATC that if he could not safely land at London Airport, he would divert to Blackbushe Airport in Hampshire or Manston Airport in Kent.

The aircraft carried out what appeared to be a normal GCA, reaching the decision height of 140 ft (43 m) at about 400 yd (366 m) from the end of the runway. Shortly after reaching this point the pilot announced over the radio, I am overshooting (aborting the landing attempt and carrying out a go-around), but a few seconds later the aircraft struck the runway and skidded along it for 140 ft (43 m) before regaining the air. With both propellers damaged by the initial contact with the ground, it finally crashed approximately 3,000 ft (914 m) further along the runway, the starboard wing being torn off and the aircraft bursting into flames as it came to rest next to a store of drain-pipes. The thick fog hindered rescue attempts and it took the fire and rescue teams 16 to 17 minutes to find the crashed aircraft. Of the 30 people on board there were only two survivors, a stewardess and a passenger; both had been seated near the tail.

== Investigation ==
A public inquiry was set up to investigate the accident, chaired by Sir Walter Monckton; while a more general investigation of the relative responsibilities of pilots and ground control with respect to landings in poor weather conditions was to be led by Lord Brabazon of Tara, the aviation pioneer and former Minister of Transport.

Lord Brabazon reported first, in February 1951, making a number of recommendations regarding the lighting of airfields in poor weather conditions, the measurement of visibility and the setting of minimum weather conditions for landing. While the accident report could not establish for certain the precise cause of the accident, it concluded that the pilot had probably intentionally descended below the decision height, only aborting the landing when the aircraft entered the fog bank at an altitude of less than 100 ft (30 m). Alice Steen, the hostess who had survived, had reported to the accident inquiry that the pilot Captain Clayton came back into the cabin and told her that they would not be landing at Northolt but at London Airport instead where the visibility was 400 yd (366 m); it was noted by the inquiry that Clayton had been told 40 yd (37 m) on the radio. It was also noted that BEA's operating manual was confusing as to whether the decision heights stated were compulsory or advisory only, and Monckton recommended that aircraft be prohibited from landing where the visibility was significantly below the minimum conditions set by the operator. The recommendations of both Brabazon and Monckton were all implemented.
