= 1957 Blackbushe Viking accident =

Aviation accident in England

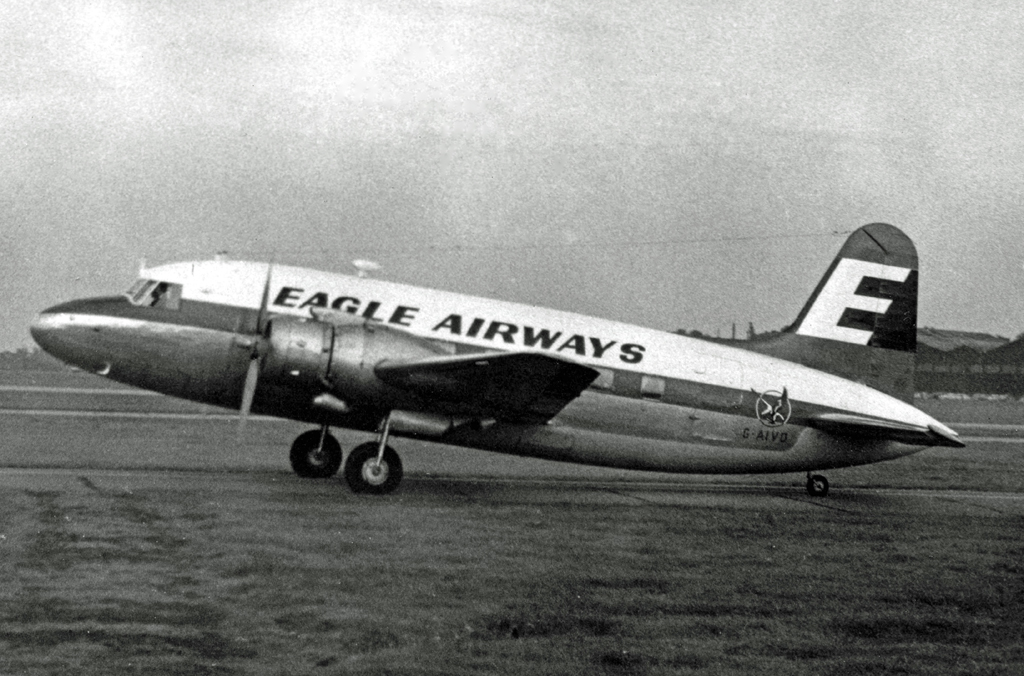
- Sister ship to the accident aircraft

Accident
- Date: 1 May 1957
- Summary: EFTO (engine failure on take-off)
- Site: Blackbushe Airport; 51.319°N 0.870°W

Aircraft
- Aircraft type: Vickers VC.1 Viking 1B
- Operator: Eagle Aviation Limited
- Registration: G-AJBO
- Flight origin: Blackbushe Airport
- Destination: RAF Castel Benito / RAF Idris, Libya
- Occupants: 35
- Passengers: 30
- Crew: 5
- Fatalities: 34
- Injuries: 1
- Survivors: 1

The 1957 Blackbushe Viking accident occurred on 1 May 1957 when an Eagle Aviation twin-engined Vickers VC.1 Viking 1B registered G-AJBO named "John Benbow" crashed into trees near Blackbushe Airport, located in Hampshire, England, on approach following a suspected engine failure on take-off. All five crew and 29 of the 30 passengers were killed. The aircraft also carried the RAF serial number XF629 allotted to this aircraft for use during trooping flights only.

== Accident ==
At 21:14, the Viking took off from Blackbushe Airport on an unscheduled passenger flight to RAF Idris in Libya. The aircraft on charter to the War Office had five crew, 25 soldiers from the Royal Army Ordnance Corps, one soldier's wife, two children and two war department civilians. At 21:16, the pilot reported I have port engine failure, I am making a left-hand circuit to come in again. As the aircraft turned onto the approach to land, while still about 1200 yards (1,116 m) from the runway, the aircraft crashed into a wooded copse at Star Hill. Thirty-four of the 35 on board were killed.

== Aftermath ==
The aircraft exploded and burst into flames when it hit the ground about 50 yards (46 m) from the A30 road. Passing lorry drivers were the first to help. Ambulances and six fire tenders from the airport were quickly on the scene. The airport fire tenders were soon joined by others from Surrey, Berkshire, Hampshire and United States Navy personnel temporarily based at Blackbushe.

The 29 bodies were recovered and four survivors were taken to Cambridge Military Hospital in Aldershot. Three of those in hospital subsequently died leaving only one survivor.

== Investigation ==
A coroner's inquest was held at Aldershot on 5 June 1957 which returned a verdict of accidental death on the 34 who died.

A public inquiry was opened in London on 23 July 1957. The inquiry report was published in November 1957, and determined that the loss was caused by an error of skill and judgement by the pilot. The report noted that although Captain Jones had flown over 6,800 hours of which 4,800 had been with the Viking he had not made a single-engined landing for at least two years. Because of the fire it was not possible to determine if the port engine had failed.

== Probable cause ==
The probable cause was the failure of the captain to maintain a safe altitude and airspeed when approaching to land on one engine after failure (or suspected failure) of the port engine.
