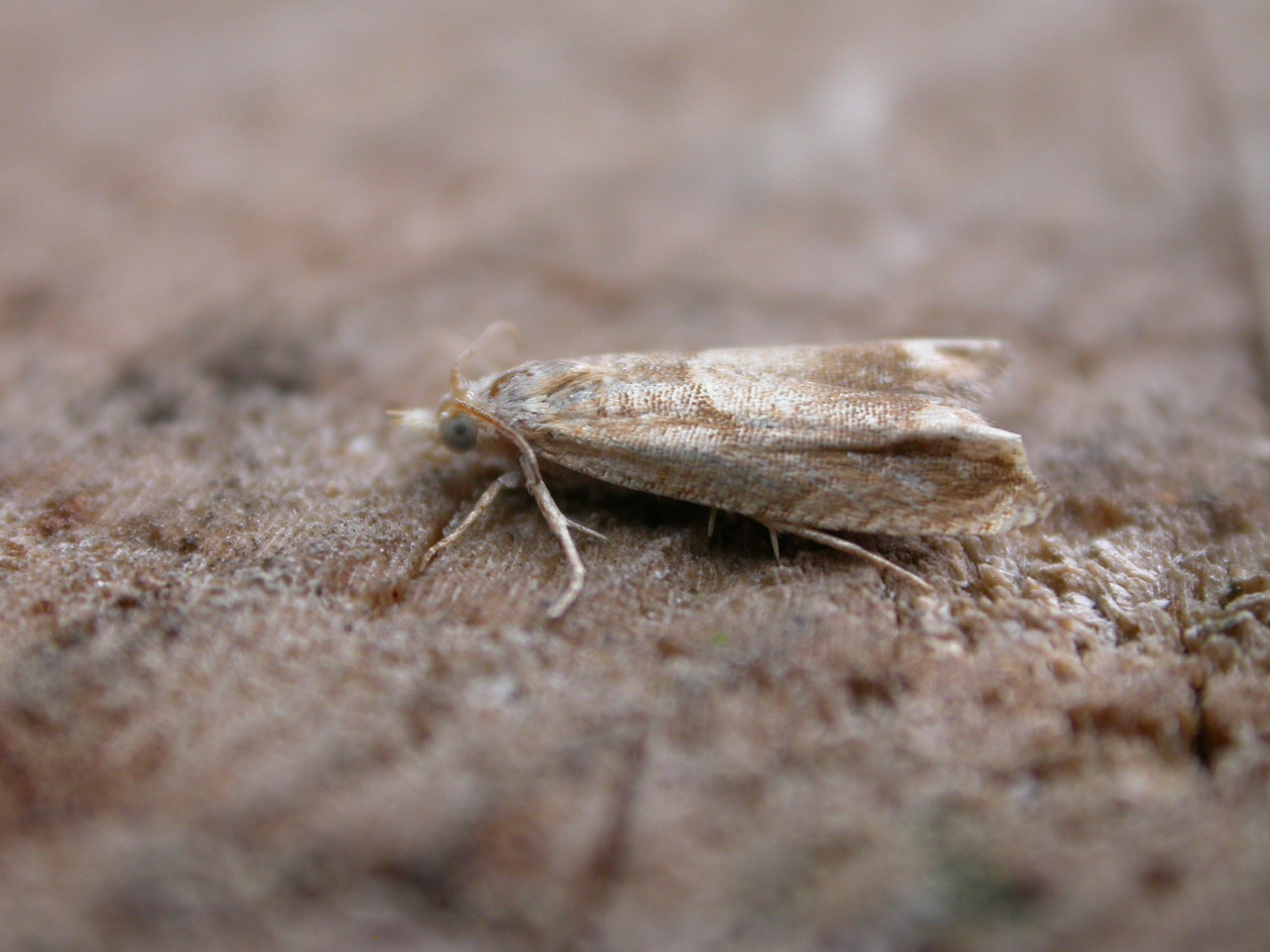

Scientific classification
- Kingdom: Animalia
- Phylum: Arthropoda
- Clade: Pancrustacea
- Class: Insecta
- Order: Lepidoptera
- Family: Tortricidae
- Genus: Eucosma
- Species: E. conterminana

Binomial name
- Eucosma conterminana (Guenée, 1845)

Synonyms
- Catoptria conterminana Guenée, 1845

= Eucosma conterminana =

Species of moth

Eucosma conterminana, the lettuce tortricid, is a moth of the family Tortricidae.

== Description ==
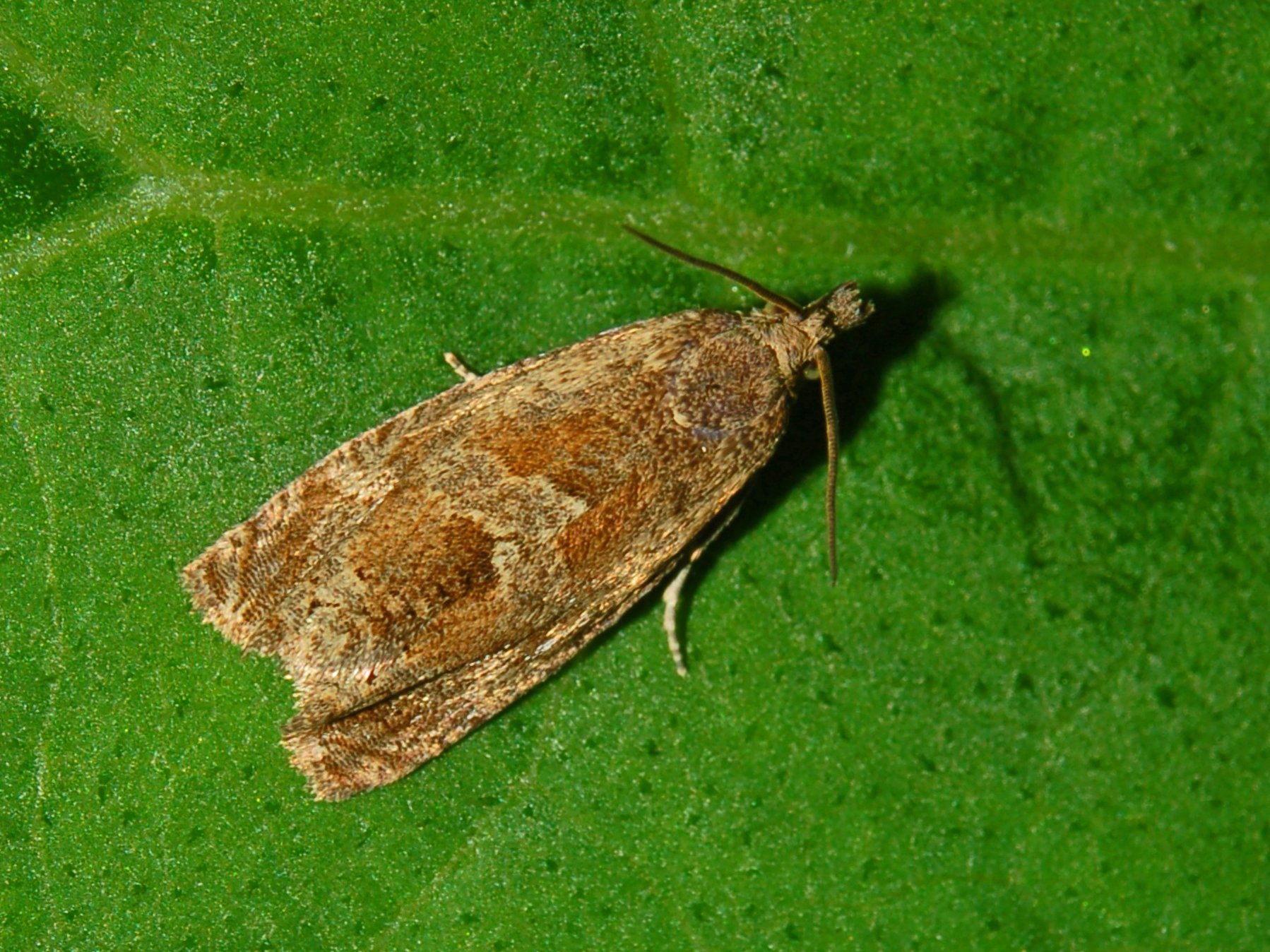
Dorsal view

The wingspan is 15–19 mm. Adults are on wing from July to August.

The larvae feed on the Lactuca serriola, Lactuca vireola and other Lactuca species.

== Distribution ==
E. conterminana is found in Europe, from the Baltic region to the Caucasus, in the Trans-Caucasus, Asia Minor, Kazakhstan, from central Asia to southern Siberia and in China and Mongolia.
