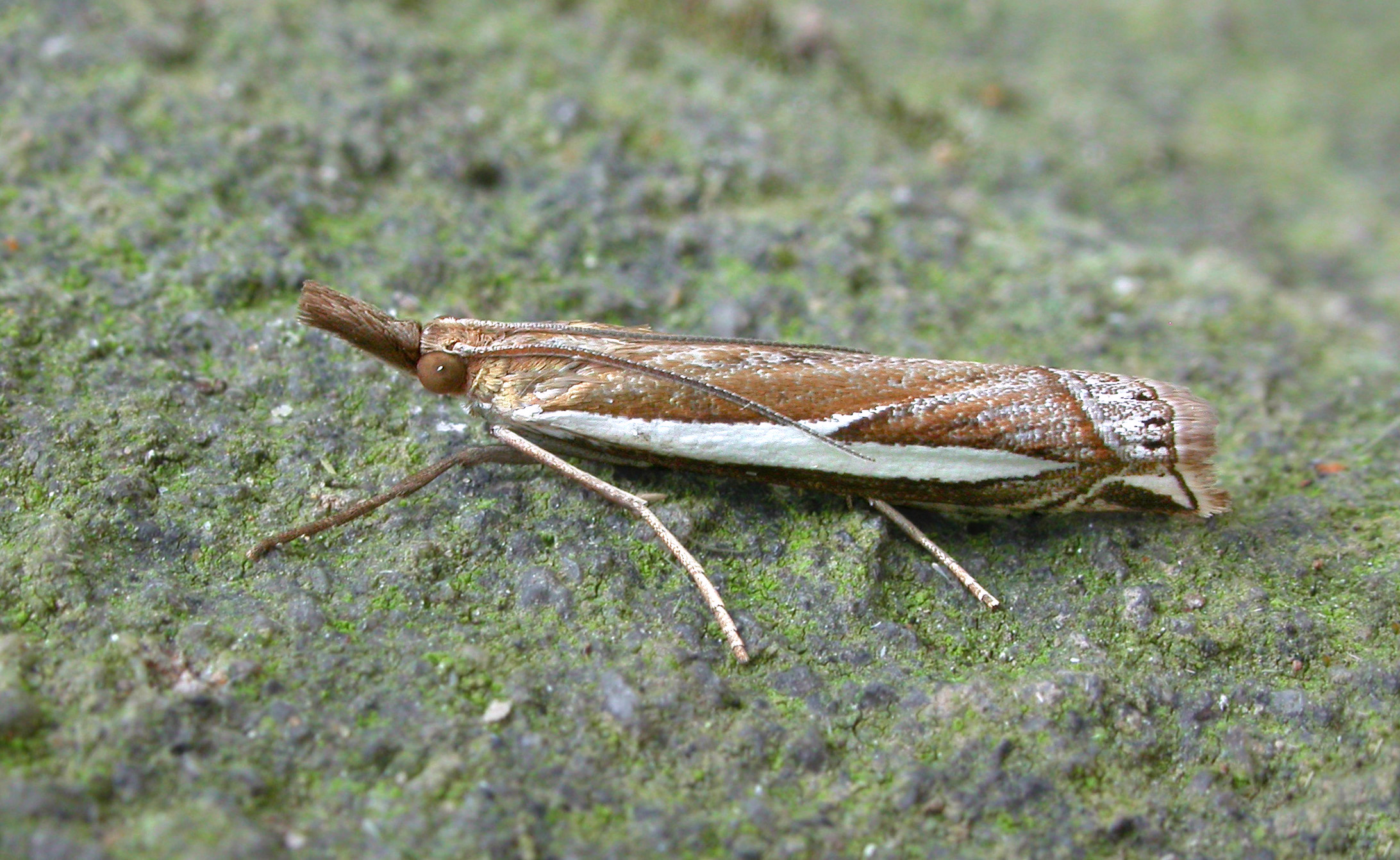

Scientific classification
- Kingdom: Animalia
- Phylum: Arthropoda
- Clade: Pancrustacea
- Class: Insecta
- Order: Lepidoptera
- Family: Crambidae
- Genus: Crambus
- Species: C. hamella

Binomial name
- Crambus hamella (Thunberg, 1788)

Synonyms
- Tinea hamella Thunberg, 1788; Crambus hamellus; Palparia baccaestria Haworth, 1811; Tinea ensigerella Hübner, 1813; Argyroteuchia ensigeralis Hübner, 1816

= Crambus hamella =

Species of moth

Crambus hamella is a species of moth in the family Crambidae described by Carl Peter Thunberg in 1788. It is found in most of Europe (except the Iberian Peninsula and most of the Balkan Peninsula), east to the Russian Far East (Amur, Sakhalin) and Japan. It is also found in North America, including Alberta, Arizona, Manitoba, Michigan, Oklahoma and Ontario.

The wingspan is 18–23 mm. The forewings with apex slightly produced; brown, posteriorly whitish-sprinkled, terminally suffused with white; a broad snow - white pointed median longitudinal streak from base, not reaching second line, lower edge with a projection in middle; second line angulated, silvery - white, anteriorly dark-edged; a triangular white subapical spot; several terminal longitudinal black marks; cilia metallic. Hindwings are grey. See also Parsons et al.

Adults are on wing from July to August in generation per year.

The larvae feed on grasses, possibly including Deschampsia flexuosa.

== Subspecies ==
- Crambus hamella hamella (Eurasia)
- Crambus hamella carpenterellus Packard, 1874 (North America)
