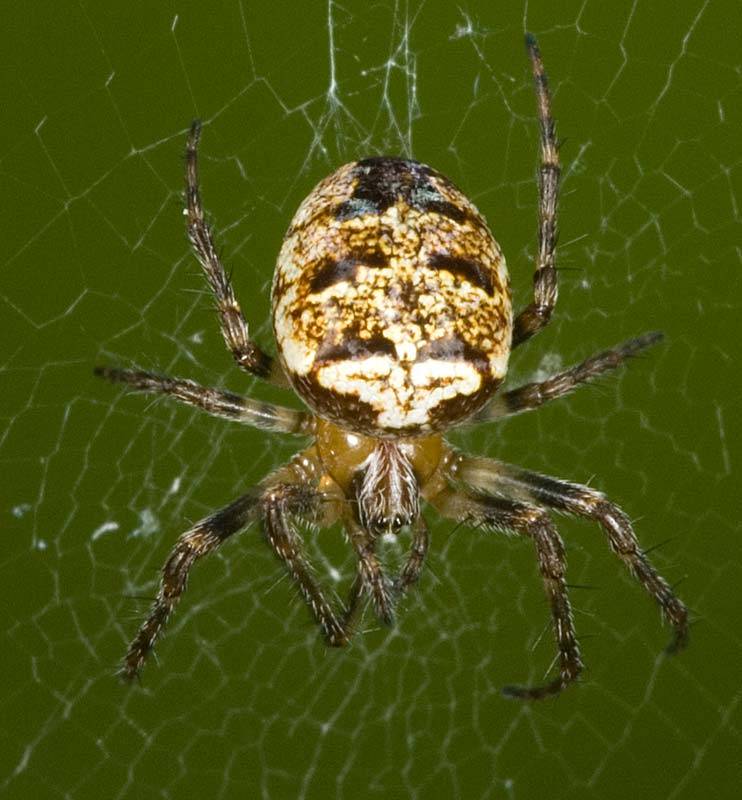
- Adult female of Zilla diodia in net.

Scientific classification
- Kingdom: Animalia
- Phylum: Arthropoda
- Subphylum: Chelicerata
- Class: Arachnida
- Order: Araneae
- Infraorder: Araneomorphae
- Family: Araneidae
- Genus: Zilla
- Species: Z. diodia

Binomial name
- Zilla diodia (Walckenaer, 1802)

Subspecies
- Zilla diodia embrikstrandi (Kolosvary, 1938) — Italy

= Zilla diodia =

Species of spider

Zilla diodia is an orb-weaver spider species found from Europe to Azerbaijan. This species was originally described by Charles Athanase Walckenaer in 1802 as Aranea diodia.

== Webs ==
Zilla diodia build very fine, vertical orb webs with often more than 50 radii and sticky spiral loops. The radii in the webs of this species – unlike those in most other orb webs – are double stranded at the periphery of the web and single stranded near the centre, presumably as an adaptation to the different forces acting on the inner and outer part of the radii.
