= Philodromus longipalpis =

Scientific classification
- Kingdom: Animalia
- Phylum: Arthropoda
- Subphylum: Chelicerata
- Class: Arachnida
- Order: Araneae
- Infraorder: Araneomorphae
- Family: Philodromidae
- Genus: Philodromus
- Species: P. longipalpis

Binomial name
- Philodromus longipalpis Simon, 1870

Species of spider

Philodromus longipalpis is a spider species found in Switzerland, Hungary, southern Europe, Turkey, Ukraine, Russia, Georgia, Azerbaijan, Iraq, and Iran.
