= Blackbushe Airport =

Airport in England, United Kingdom

- IATA: BBS; ICAO: EGLK

Summary
- Airport type: Private-owned, Public-use
- Operator: Blackbushe Airport Ltd
- Location: Yateley
- Opened: February 1947; 79 years ago
- Built: 1 November 1942; 84 years ago
- Elevation AMSL: 99 m (325 ft)
- Coordinates: 51°19′26″N 000°50′51″W
- Website: www.blackbushe.com

Map
- Location in Hampshire

Runways
Direction	Length		Surface
Direction	m	ft	Surface
07/25	1,335	4,380	Asphalt
- Sources: UK AIP at NATS

Blackbushe Airport (IATA: BBS, ICAO: EGLK) is an operational general aviation airport in the civil parish of Yateley in the north-east corner of the English county of Hampshire. Built during the Second World War as RAF Blackbushe, Blackbushe is north of the A30 road between Camberley and Hook. For a time, it straddled this road, with traffic being stopped whilst airliners were towed across. The south side was used for aircraft maintenance, using wartime-built hangars. Today, only the part of the airfield that lay north of the A30 remains in active use. The historical name for the flat piece of land on which it is sited is Hartford Bridge Flats. The nearest towns are Yateley and Fleet.

Blackbushe Aerodrome has a CAA Ordinary Licence (Number P693) that allows flights for the public transport of passengers or for flying instruction as authorised by the licensee (Blackbushe Airport Limited). The aerodrome is licensed for night use.

One of several airfields eclipsed since 1958 by the growth of Heathrow and Gatwick airports, Blackbushe was once a significant airport for passenger and cargo charter flights for the London area.

Currently based aircraft include several corporate jets, three fixed-wing flying schools, as well as Aerobility, a flying charity for disabled people. There is also a helicopter school which operates a satellite base at Blackbushe. The airport is open to the general public and is also popular for walks around its perimeter and to see the wildlife in Yateley Common and Castle Bottom National Nature reserve.

The Pathfinder Cafe, opened in 2021, serves breakfast and lunch to visitors of the airport. It has outdoor seating overlooking taxiway Hotel, the grass apron, and the westerly end of runway 07/25.

== Royal Air Force ==
The airport started life in 1942 as RAF Hartford Bridge, and it was used by RAF squadrons throughout the remainder of Second World War for reconnaissance, defence and strike operations using Spitfires and Mosquitoes. It was also the home of the Free French Air Force Squadron (Lorraine).

A number of important people landed at the airport including King George VI and Queen Elizabeth, Supreme Allied Commander General Dwight D. Eisenhower and Field Marshal Montgomery.

RAF Hartfordbridge was also the home of a new system known as "FIDO" (Fog Investigation and Dispersal Operation) built by the Airforce Construction Unit. Pipes were laid down both sides on Runway 26, and fed with fuel. The pipes had small holes, and if the airfield was shrouded in fog, the fuel was ignited. The heat created would cause the fog to disperse.

On 18 November 1944, the airfield was renamed to RAF Blackbushe, because of confusion over a similar area in Norfolk. On 15 November 1946, the RAF had moved out, and the airport was handed over to the Ministry of Civil Aviation, becoming Blackbushe Airport. The A30 was fully reopened to traffic.

== Ministry of Civil Aviation ==
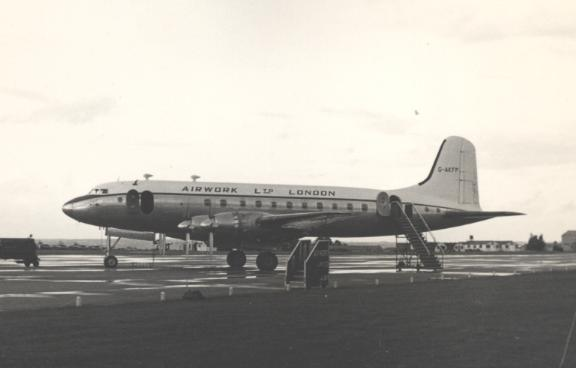
Airwork Limited Handley Page Hermes IVA on the main apron at Blackbushe in September 1954 before departing on a trooping run

In February 1947, the airfield was opened as Blackbushe Airport under the control of the Ministry of Civil Aviation. Full customs facilities were provided for both air transport operators and the private owners of light and executive aircraft.

Over the next few years, airlines such as Britavia, Westminster Airways, Airwork, and Silver City all moved in operating Lancastrians (passenger aircraft derived from Lancaster bombers), DC-3s, and Bristol Freighters. Movements by 1950 had risen to 11,000 per year, with 16,000 passengers.

The 1950s saw further expansion, Air Contractors started a scheduled service to the Channel Islands, and Eagle Aviation launched several routes to Europe on DC-3s and Viking airliners. Britavia and Airwork also brought in the Hermes airliner, flying charters to Africa and Australia. Blackbushe became a robust diversion airport for London Heathrow, and as a home for aircraft visiting the Farnborough Airshow. The facilities were constantly being upgraded with new buildings, runway extensions, and new navigational aids and lighting.

Overseas-based charter airlines often used Blackbushe for their flight to the UK, normally finding that the airfield was open for operations, even when other airports in the London area were closed by fog. The airfield's hilltop position helped in this respect. The Avro Yorks of Tropic Airways of Johannesburg visited for several years.

Blackbushe was used as a major location for the 1956 film The Crooked Sky in which the former RAF station buildings and then current commercial aircraft are seen.

The airport was also used as a filming location in the making of the 1951 film No Highway in the Sky directed by Henry Koster, starring James Stewart, Marlene Dietrich and Jack Hawkins.

== United States Navy operations ==
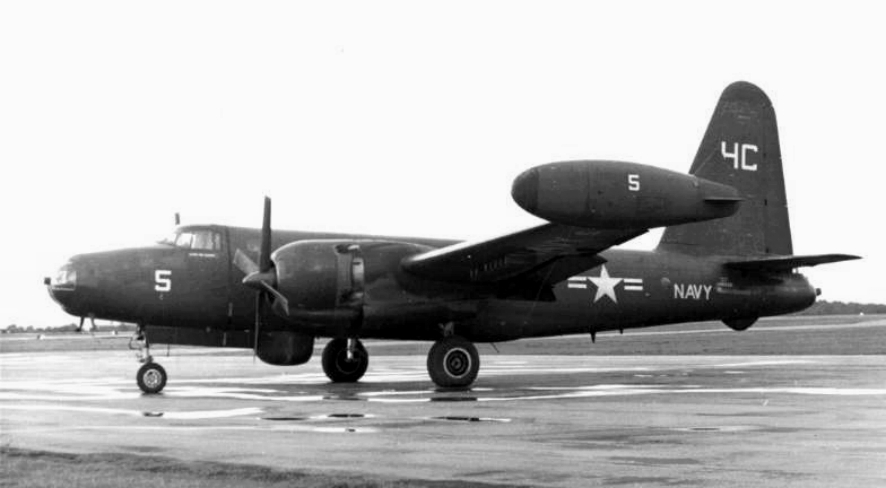
US Navy Lockheed P2V-5 Neptune patrol aircraft visiting the USN facility at Blackbushe in September 1954

From the early 1950s, the United States Navy (USN) had a facility on the north-east edge of the airport which frequently handled visiting naval aircraft. These included patrol types such as the Lockheed P2V Neptune and the Martin P4M Mercator. Large USN transports that used the airport regularly were the Douglas R5D Skymaster and Douglas R6D Liftmaster. In 1955, USN UK-based communications and liaison aircraft of FASRON 200, previously attached to RAF Hendon, in north London, were switched to Blackbushe.

By 1955, the airport was handling 36,000 movements per year. The US Navy also set up a base as a communications headquarters. This brought new aircraft such as Beech Expediters, Dakotas, DC-7s and Super Constellations. In the late 1950s, BOAC launched operations of the Comet airliners. Other operators such as Pan-Am, SAS, and BEA were using Blackbushe regularly as a diversion from Heathrow. However, with the newly built Gatwick airport, the lease on Blackbushe was not granted, and these operators started using Gatwick.

On 31 May 1960, the airport was closed. All of the infrastructure, fixtures, and fittings were auctioned off. Parts of the runways were dug up. The airport remained closed until 6 October 1962, when it was formally reopened as a general aviation field. During the closure, many light aircraft continued to use the airfield.

== Private ownership ==
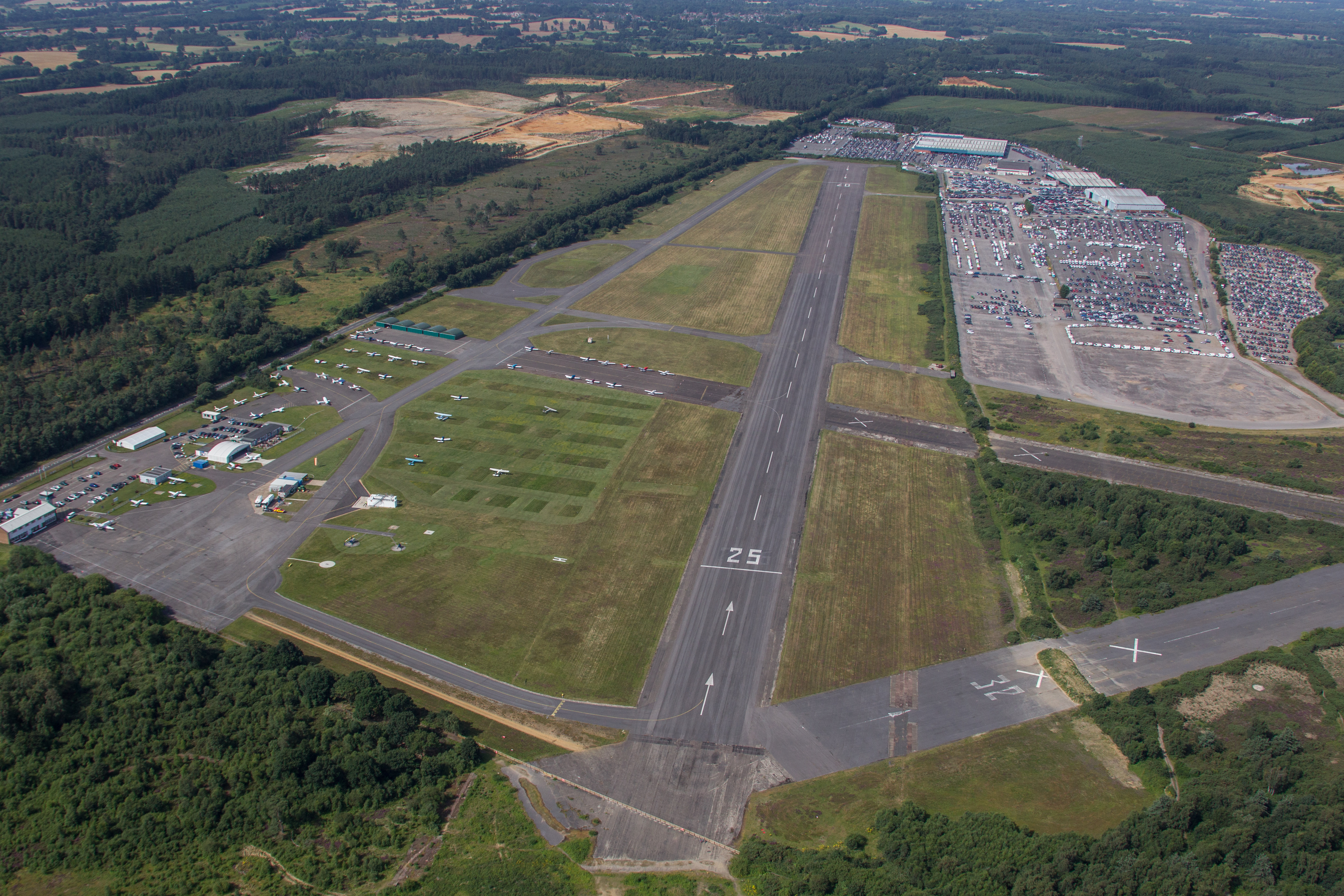
Aerial View of Blackbushe Airport in 2016

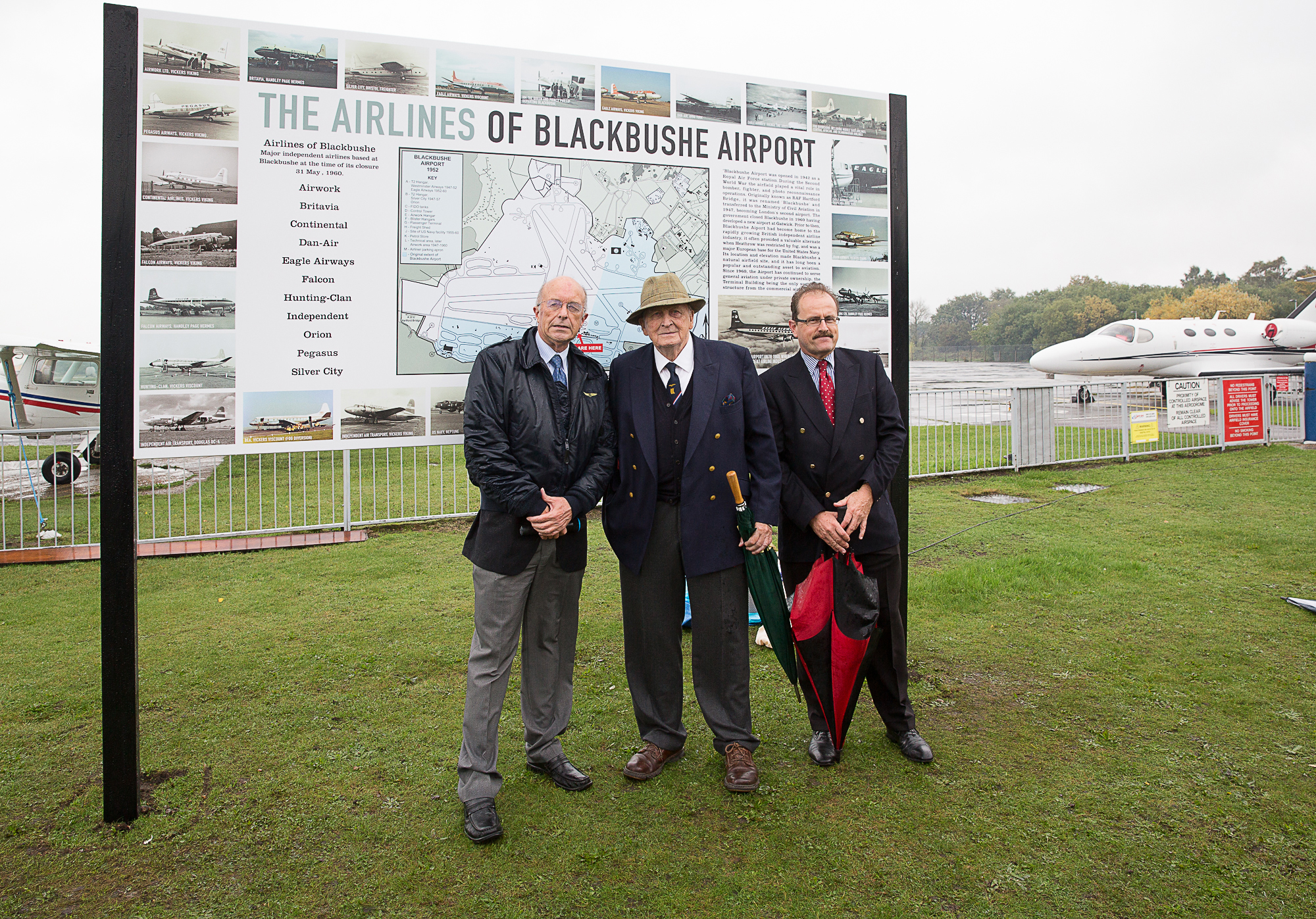
Blackbushe Airport 13 October 2012. Harold Bamberg (centre), Founder Chairman of Eagle Airways stands before the sign he has unveiled listing classic airliners and operators that flew from Blackbushe during its heyday at the heart of Britain's post-war independent airline industry. Names include Britavia, Continental, Dan-Air, Eagle Airways, Falcon, Orion and Pegasus.

The airport passed into private ownership and was formally reopened as a general aviation field on 6 October 1962. There had been a fight to reopen the airport, as there were many objections; however, the reopening was mainly due to one man and his resolve, Air Vice Marshal Don Bennett, CB, CBE, DSO. Born in Toowoomba, Australia and best known for his RAF Pathfinder exploits in the Second World War and his escape after being shot down during the raid on the German battleship Tirpitz, when he evaded capture and escaped to Sweden, from where he was able to return to Britain.

The Hampshire County Council Planning Committee rejected an application on 25 August 1961, one of two applications for the development of a private aerodrome on the site of Blackbushe Airport. The applications, made by AVM Bennett, were for the use of an area of 325 acres as a private aerodrome, and for the erection of aircraft hangars. The vice-chairman of the committee, Lord Porchester, said that the Ministry of Aviation was not supporting AVM Bennett in his attempt to re-open Blackbushe for private flying. The reported reasons for the committee's decision were that most of the land was to be an open space, so that the proposal would be detrimental to the amenities of Yateley village, and it would interfere with safety and traffic flow on the Basingstoke - London A30 trunk road. Despite many objections, AVM Bennett battled the red tape and finally owned and opened the aerodrome in 1962.

The airport became a base for a large collection of historic World War II aircraft, including four Junkers Ju 52s, six Douglas DC-3s and a number of smaller planes, such as Spitfires, which were rarely seen on the tarmac. The finest was, perhaps, a Heinkel bomber, but this was sold in order to purchase a replacement which then crashed soon afterwards.

On 15 July 1978, the airfield hosted an all-day open-air concert, the Picnic at Blackbushe Aerodrome, which was attended by some 200,000 people. Bob Dylan headlined, with Eric Clapton, Joan Armatrading, Graham Parker and the Rumour, Lake, and Merger also appearing.

From 1985 to 2015, the airport was owned by British Car Auctions (BCA), which refurbished the terminal building, and replaced the tower in 1992.

From 1998 to 2009, The Queen's helicopter was based there..

In 2008, the newly formed Blink launched their European air-taxi service from Blackbushe to over 600 destinations using a fleet of Cessna Citation Mustang aircraft. These were a regular sight at Blackbushe until Blink was closed by its new French owners in 2018.

In 2014, PremiAir, who had been based at Blackbushe since the early 2000s, and who operated light jets and executive helicopters from Blackbushe, went into administration. They were evicted from the 40,000 sq ft of hangars on the north side, and BCA repurposed them as part of their auction facilities.

== Present day ==
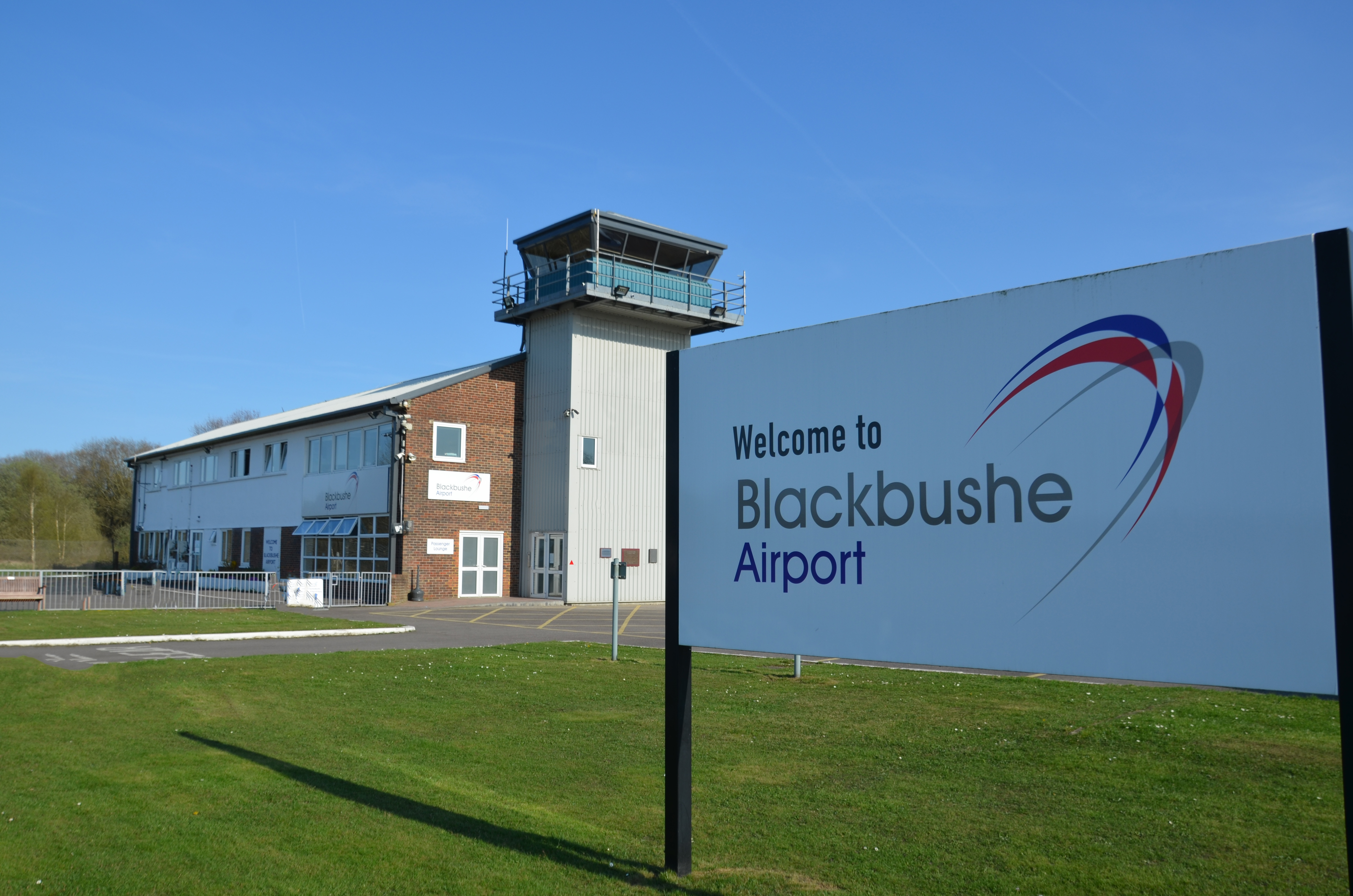
Blackbushe Airport in 2018

In 2015, the airport was sold to Sir Peter Ogden, who had previously founded Blink in 2008. The north side hangars were not included in the sale, so Blackbushe then had no hangar facilities.

The new owners plan to invest in the refurbishments of the airport and bring the facilities up to 21st century standards, including building new hangars to replace the space lost on the north side.

Investment has been made in repairs to the taxiways and parking areas, as well as repainting all of the airside markings.

In late 2017, a new airport management team was put in place. They have set about supporting the general aviation activities at the airport.

== De-registration of common land and future development ==
Blackbushe Airport sits on part of Yateley Common. Despite access to the active airfield site being restricted since the 1940s, and provisions of the Aviation Security Act 2018 prohibiting trespass on an aerodrome, development of new facilities is restricted by this common land status. In November 2016, an application was submitted by Blackbushe Airport to Hampshire County Council to deregister the active aerodrome.

Blackbushe Airport have published their vision for the airport's future, which includes a new terminal building, a new café, hangars for maintenance and aircraft parking, and a flying school hub.

A public inquiry was held at the Elvetham Hotel on 2–5 April 2019. On 12 June 2019, the Planning Inspectorate issued a decision granting the application to deregister the airport from Yateley Common.

Hampshire County Council subsequently sought a judicial review of the inspector's decision which was held at the Royal Courts of Justice on 11–12 February 2020. On 23 April 2020, the High Court ruled in favour of Hampshire County Council. The Court of Appeal upheld this decision, and the Supreme court declined to hear the case, referring the matter back to the Planning Inspector for redetermination. In November 2023, a Planning Inspector issued a decision confirming the footprint of the terminal building and part of the airport cafe to be removed from the register of common land, but no curtilage.

In January 2024, Blackbushe Airport submitted a new application to the Planning Inspectorate for de-registration and exchange of 35.3 acres of the airport for an equally sized area at Cottage Farm, some 2 miles to the east of the airport.. This application was approved on 14 May 2025. Construction on the Phase 1 hangar development started in October 2025 and is expected to complete in late 2026.

== Accidents and incidents ==
- On 20 January 1956, a Vickers Viscount G-AMOM of British European Airways crashed on take-off when the training pilot mishandled the controls for the starboard engines while simulating an engine failure on take-off.
- Shortly before midnight on 5 November 1956, a Handley Page Hermes chartered from the Britavia company bringing military families home from Tripoli crashed. 3 crew and 4 children were killed.
- On 1 May 1957, a Vickers Viking G-AJBO operated by Eagle Aviation crashed near Blackbushe Aerodrome. The Viking suffered a port engine failure after take-off and the aircraft turned and crashed on Star Hill on approach to Blackbushe; five crew and 29 passengers died. The aircraft was on charter to War Office and carrying servicemen and families to RAF Idris in Libya.
- On 1 September 1958, a RN Sea Hawk XE462 from HMS Ark Royal and part of a seven aircraft display team at Farnborough suffered an engine fire warning, the pilot peeled away toward Blackbushe and felt it necessary to eject from the aircraft over Blackbushe. The aircraft pitched up and went into a spin and crashed into the ground close to the Silver City Hangar. The pilot Lt R.C.Dimmock survived with a broken ankle.
- On 26 April 1987, a Cessna 441 Conquest II G-MOXY, operated by Brown Air Services Ltd, crashed south of the A30 road as a go-around was initiated after unsafe landing gear indication on final approach. The pilot, as sole occupant, was killed.
- On 23 December 2000, a Beechcraft King Air 200 VP-BBK spiralled out of control and crashed into a business park at the end of the runway, shortly after take-off. All 5 people on board were killed.
- On 20 July 2004, A Boeing B-52 bomber overflew the airport by mistake, having been scheduled to fly past Farnborough.
- On 31 July 2015, an Embraer 505 Phenom 300 HZ-IBN overshot the runway on landing and crashed into the British Car Auctions site. All four people on board were killed, including three members of the bin Laden family.
