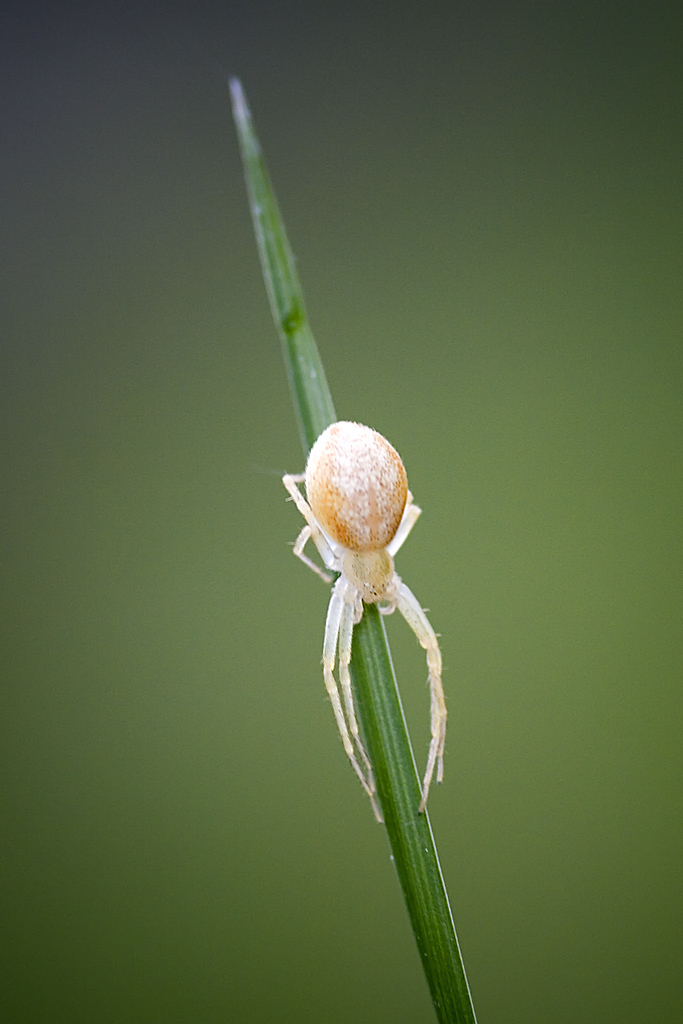

Scientific classification
- Kingdom: Animalia
- Phylum: Arthropoda
- Subphylum: Chelicerata
- Class: Arachnida
- Order: Araneae
- Infraorder: Araneomorphae
- Family: Philodromidae
- Genus: Philodromus
- Species: P. albidus

Binomial name
- Philodromus albidus Kulczynski, 1911

= Philodromus albidus =

Species of spider

Philodromus albidus is a spider species found in Europe.
