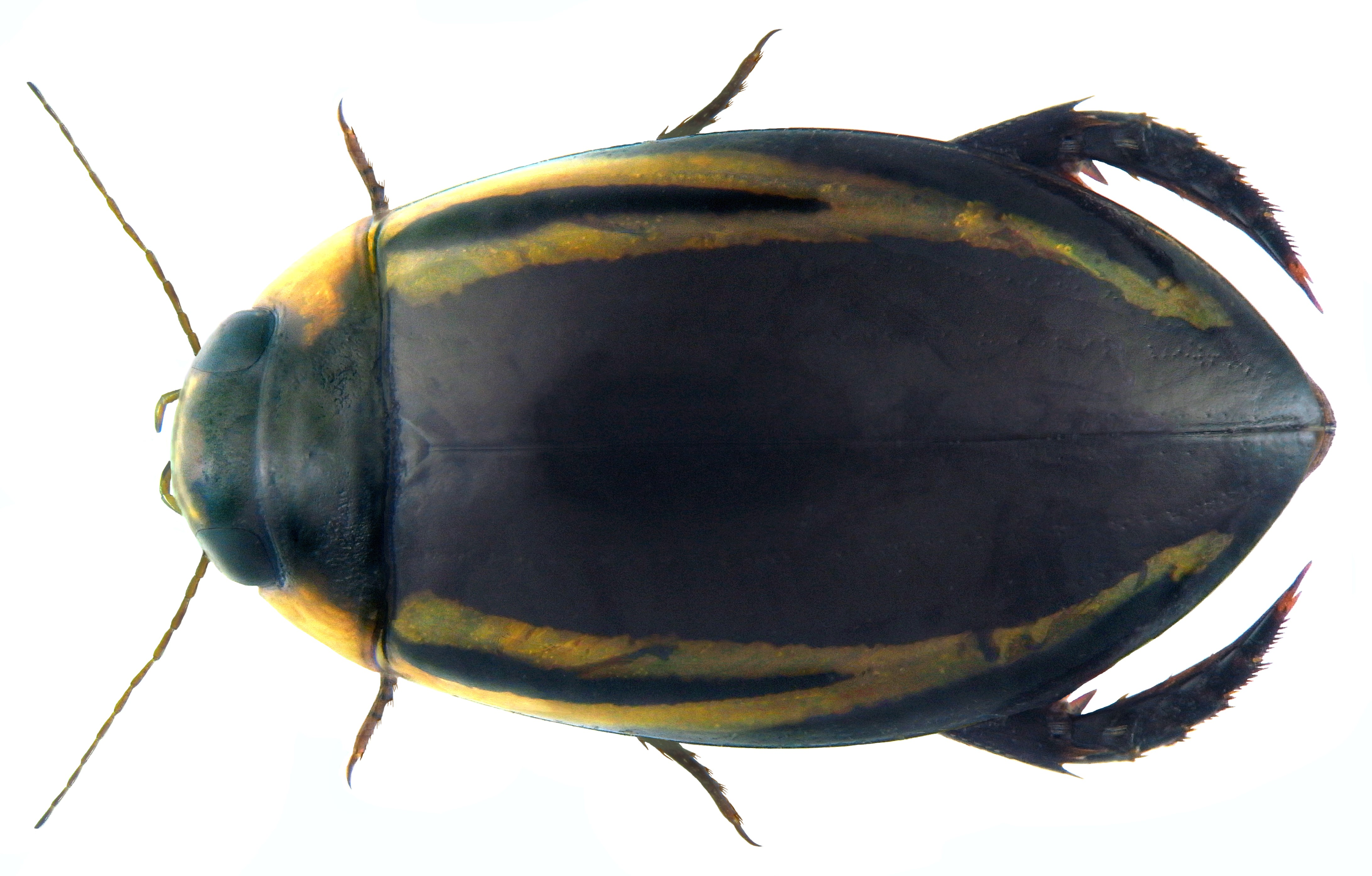
- female

Scientific classification
- Kingdom: Animalia
- Phylum: Arthropoda
- Class: Insecta
- Order: Coleoptera
- Suborder: Adephaga
- Family: Dytiscidae
- Genus: Hydaticus
- Species: H. satoi

Binomial name
- Hydaticus satoi Wewalka, 1975

= Hydaticus satoi =

Species of beetle

Hydaticus satoi, is a species of predaceous diving beetle found in India, Bhutan, Myanmar, Nepal, Sri Lanka, China, Indonesia, Japan, Philippines, Saudi Arabia, Taiwan and Thailand.

== Subspecies ==
Two subspecies are identified.

- Hydaticus satoi dhofarensis Pederzani, 2003
- Hydaticus satoi satoi Wewalka, 1975

The subspecies dhofarensis has a length of 3.4 to 15.10 mm whereas subspecies satoi with a length of 12 to 14 mm. The subspecies dhofarensis is broader, broadest behind the middle and less tapering in front and behind than the nominate subspecies. Dorsum black with yellow pattern. Head yellowish in front and blackish behind. Pronotum widely yellowish laterally and black at the middle. There is a border line visible between black and yellow, which is slightly angulate at the middle. Elytra with yellow bands which are narrower and shorter than in ssp. satoi. Sometimes the outer band approaches the pre-apical yellow spot. Outer band is very narrow in melanistic specimens. The discal band is either absent or sometimes reduced to a short and narrow sub-basal stripe. Ventrum dark brown with yellow pro-sternal process. Legs and meso-femurs are yellowish anteriorly. Intermediate tibiae and tarsi are light brown, whereas posterior legs are dark brown in color. Palpi and basal half of antennae are yellowish. Dorsum covered by a dense and minute puncturation interspersed with larger punctures. Large puncture are usually found at the base of elytra. Submarginal rows of punctures are evenly found in pronotum, elytral rows and the sculpture of the ventrum.

Subspecies satoi has narrow yellow stripes in humeral and sub marginal areas. These stripes joined posteriorly after the middle. Female is about 13.8 mm long.
