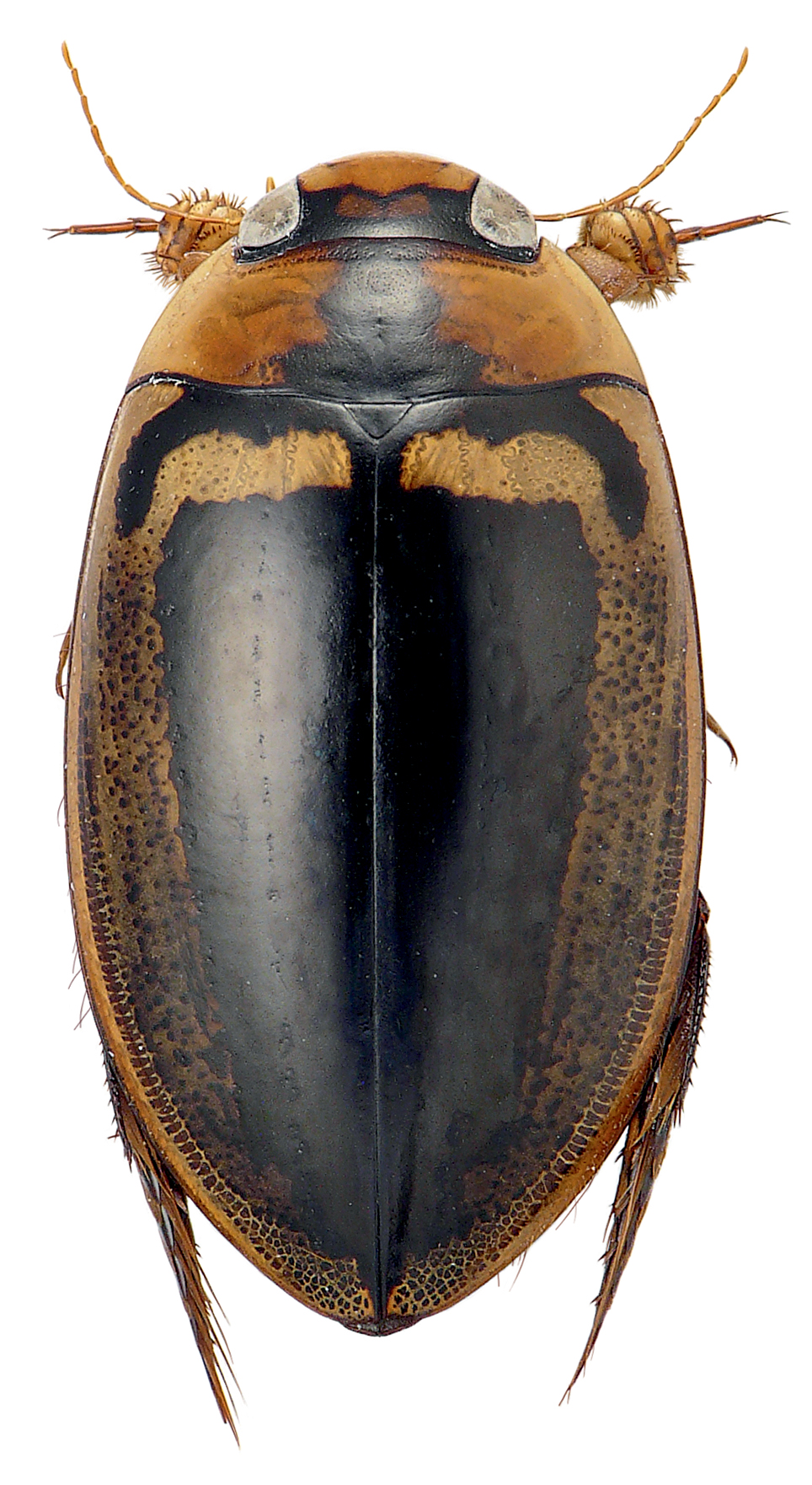

Scientific classification
- Kingdom: Animalia
- Phylum: Arthropoda
- Clade: Pancrustacea
- Class: Insecta
- Order: Coleoptera
- Suborder: Adephaga
- Family: Dytiscidae
- Genus: Hydaticus
- Subgenus: Prodaticus
- Species: H. luczonicus

Binomial name
- Hydaticus luczonicus Aubé, 1838

= Hydaticus luczonicus =

Species of beetle

Hydaticus luczonicus is a species of predaceous diving beetle found in India, Indonesia, Philippines, Sri Lanka, Thailand and Vietnam.

== Gallery ==
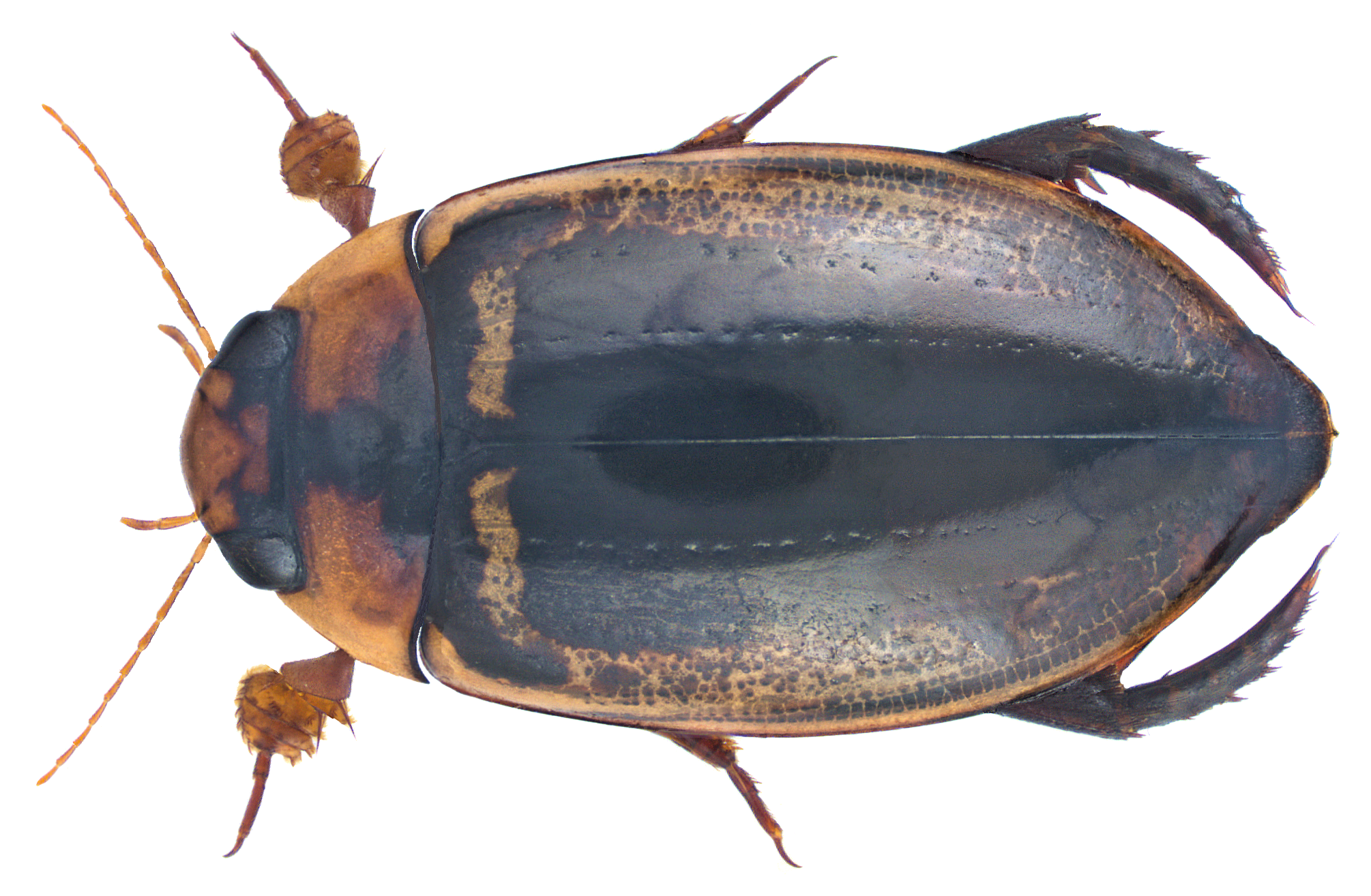

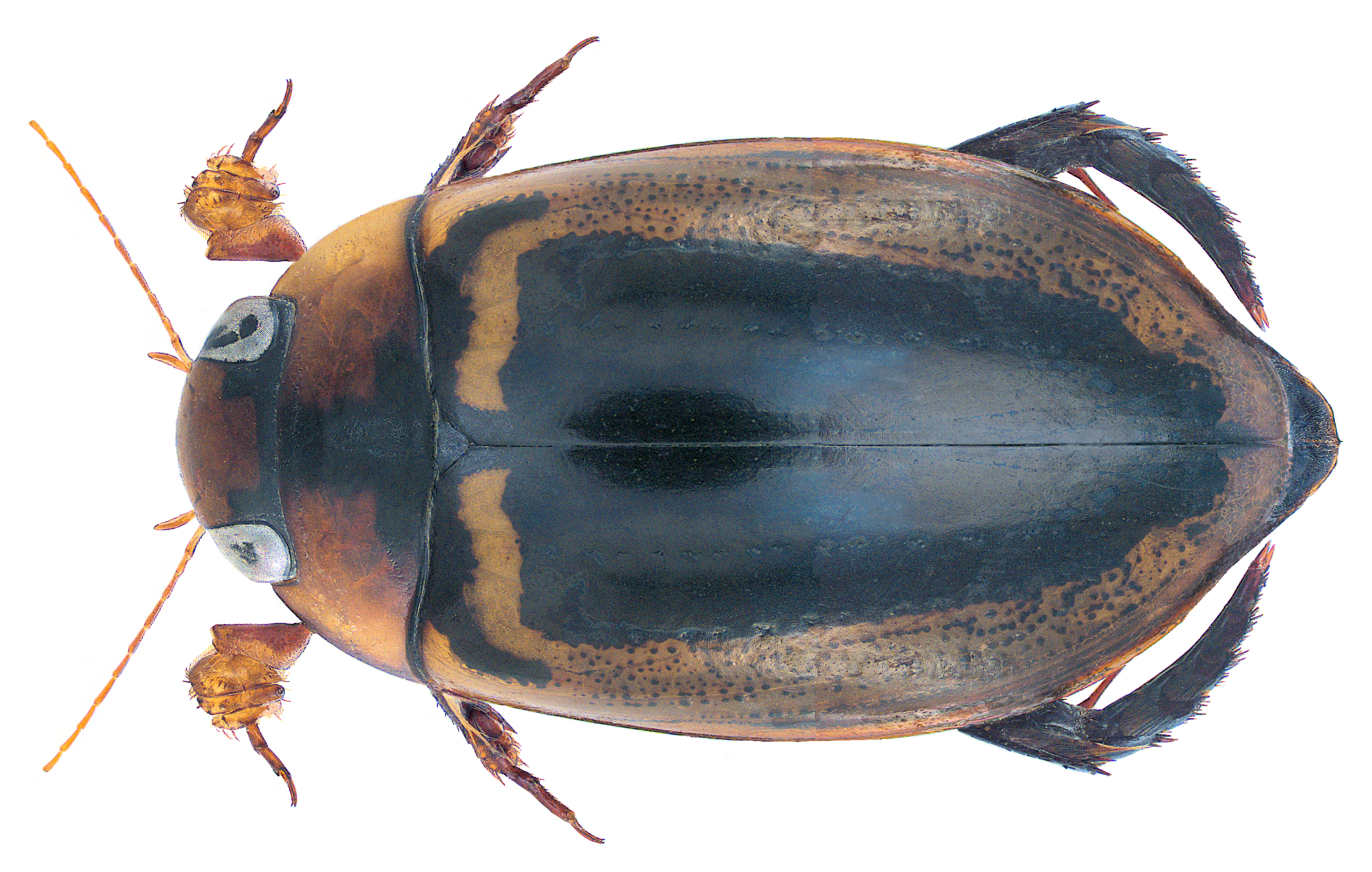
male

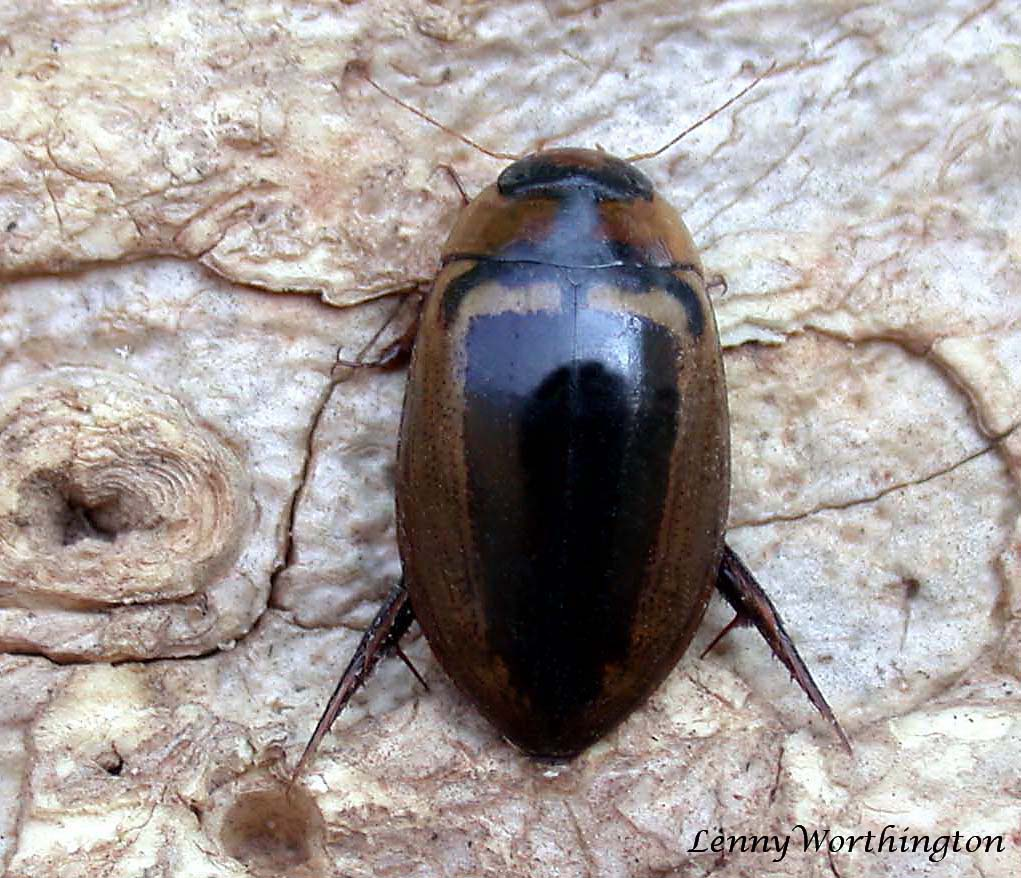
