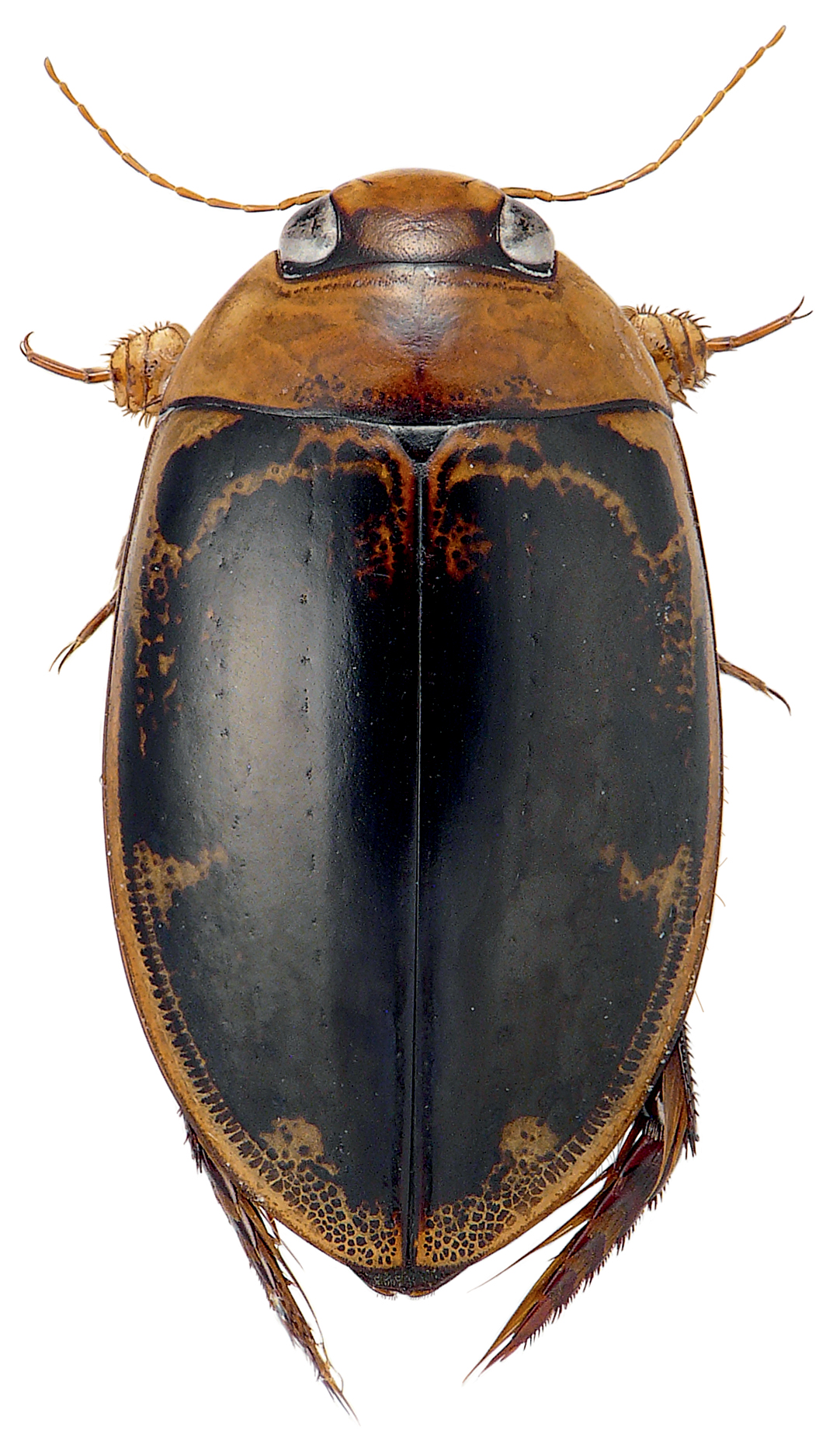
- Hydaticus pacificus pacificus

Scientific classification
- Kingdom: Animalia
- Phylum: Arthropoda
- Clade: Pancrustacea
- Class: Insecta
- Order: Coleoptera
- Suborder: Adephaga
- Family: Dytiscidae
- Genus: Hydaticus
- Subgenus: Prodaticus
- Species: H. pacificus

Binomial name
- Hydaticus pacificus Aubé, 1838

Synonyms
- Hydaticus banksii Crotch, 1872; Hydaticus pacificus var. ceylonicus Guignot, 1935; Hydaticus discindens Walker, 1858; Hydaticus pacificus var. latihamatus Régimbart, 1899; Hydaticus pacificus var. lunatus Régimbart, 1899; Dytiscus ruficollis Fabricius, 1787

= Hydaticus pacificus =

Species of beetle

Hydaticus pacificus is a species of predaceous diving beetle found in South and South East Asia.

== Subspecies ==
Three subspecies identified.

- Hydaticus pacificus andamanicus - India, Andaman Islands
- Hydaticus pacificus conspersus - Japan, Taiwan, China
- Hydaticus pacificus discindens - Sri Lanka
- Hydaticus pacificus lunatus - Malaysia, Philippines and Indonesia
- Hydaticus pacificus pacificus - India, Myanmar, Thailand, China, Cambodia, Laos, Vietnam, Malaysia, Singapore, Philippines, Indonesia

== Biology ==
After mating, adult female has been observed to deposit eggs singly on the surface of the Salvinia molesta.
