= Hydaticus cinctipennis =

Scientific classification
- Domain: Eukaryota
- Kingdom: Animalia
- Phylum: Arthropoda
- Class: Insecta
- Order: Coleoptera
- Suborder: Adephaga
- Family: Dytiscidae
- Genus: Hydaticus
- Species: H. cinctipennis

Binomial name
- Hydaticus cinctipennis Aubé, 1838

Species of beetle

Hydaticus cinctipennis is a species of predaceous diving beetle in the family Dytiscidae. It is found in North America.
