= Hydaticus incertus =

Scientific classification
- Kingdom: Animalia
- Phylum: Arthropoda
- Clade: Pancrustacea
- Class: Insecta
- Order: Coleoptera
- Suborder: Adephaga
- Family: Dytiscidae
- Genus: Hydaticus
- Subgenus: Prodaticus
- Species: H. incertus

Binomial name
- Hydaticus incertus Régimbart, 1888

Synonyms
- Hydaticus martensi Wewalka, 1972; Hydaticus (Guignotites) incertus Régimbart, 1888

Species of beetle

Hydaticus incertus is a species of predaceous diving beetle found in India, Bhutan, Myanmar, Nepal, Sri Lanka, China, Malaysia, and Thailand.
