= Hydaticus fabricii =

Scientific classification
- Kingdom: Animalia
- Phylum: Arthropoda
- Clade: Pancrustacea
- Class: Insecta
- Order: Coleoptera
- Suborder: Adephaga
- Family: Dytiscidae
- Genus: Hydaticus
- Subgenus: Prodaticus
- Species: H. fabricii

Binomial name
- Hydaticus fabricii (W.S. MacLeay, 1825)

Synonyms
- Colymbetes fabricii W.S. Macleay, 1825; Dytiscus varius Fabricius, 1801; Hydaticus fabriciusi Ball, 1932; Hydaticus rufulus Aubé, 1838; Dytiscus varius Fabricius, 1801; Hydaticus leander Peschet, 1917; Hydatiaus incertus Vazirani, 1969

Species of beetle

Hydaticus fabricii is a species of predaceous diving beetle found in India, Afghanistan, Myanmar, Nepal, Pakistan, Sri Lanka, China, Indonesia, Iran, Japan, Philippines, Taiwan, Thailand, Vietnam and Australia.

== Subspecies ==
Three subspecies are identified.

- Hydaticus fabricii confusus Boheman, 1858
- Hydaticus fabricii fabricii (W.S.MacLeay, 1825)
- Hydaticus fabricii loeffleri Wewalka, 1979

Most authors have grouped at least eight forms: six species and two subspecies under the name H. fabricii, which can hardly be separated according to external characteristics, but can be clearly differentiated according to the male genitalia. This oval shaped beetle has a body size of about 9.0 to 10.7 mm. Front and rear edges of the pronotum are clearly darkened. The bristles on the rear edge of the hind tarsal phalanx are quite long on the upper side. There is a bristle border on the rear edge of the adhesive disc in the fore tarsi of male. These bristles are longer than half the length of the limb. In male, aedeagus is fairly straight and has a tip long bristle plate in penis.

The subspecies loeffleri is much smaller than nominate subspecies. The penis tip is slightly curved. The subspecies confusus, has a slimmer penis and the bristle plate is at the tip of the penis much shorter than ssp. fabricii.
