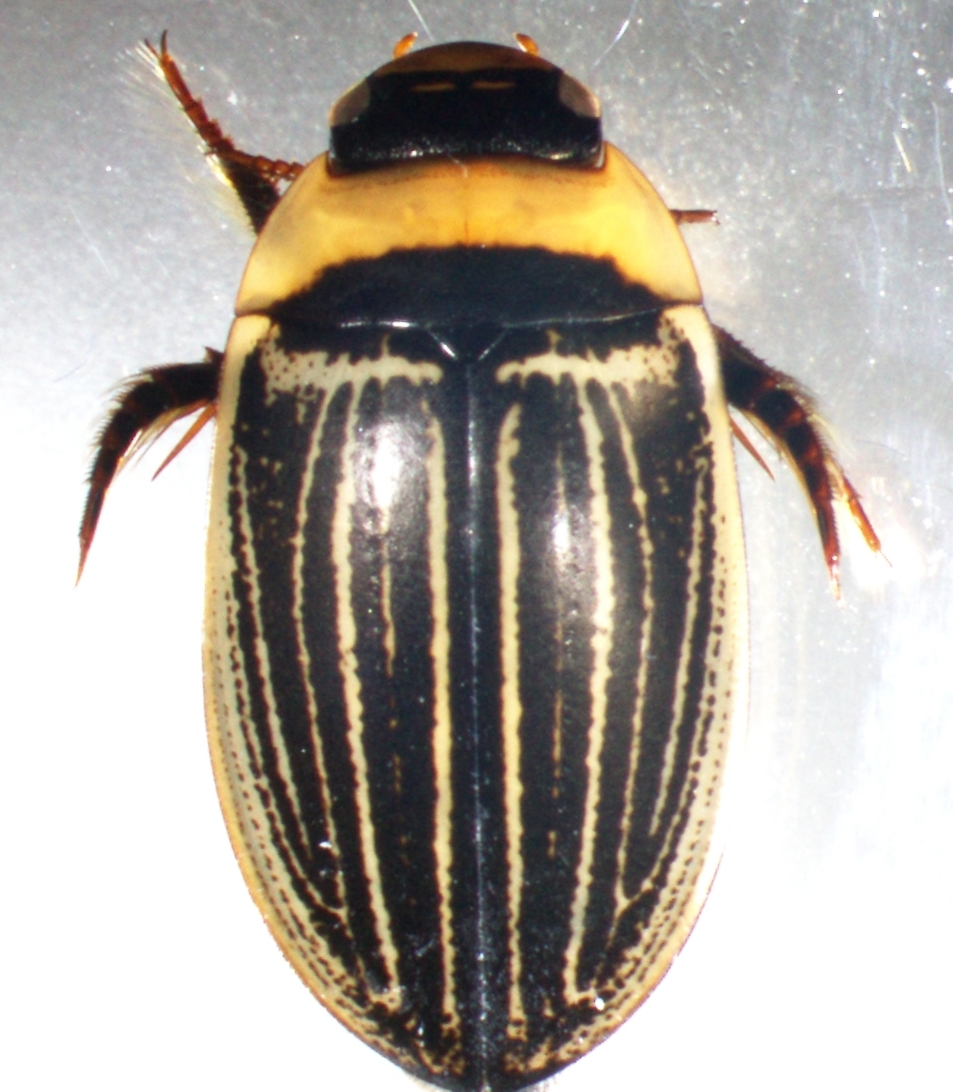
- Adult female

Scientific classification
- Domain: Eukaryota
- Kingdom: Animalia
- Phylum: Arthropoda
- Class: Insecta
- Order: Coleoptera
- Suborder: Adephaga
- Family: Dytiscidae
- Genus: Hydaticus
- Species: H. aruspex

Binomial name
- Hydaticus aruspex Clark, 1864

Synonyms
- Hydaticus modestus Sharp, 1882

= Hydaticus aruspex =

Species of beetle

Hydaticus aruspex is a species of predaceous diving beetle in the family Dytiscidae. It is found in North America and the Palearctic.
