= Hydaticus fractifer =

Scientific classification
- Kingdom: Animalia
- Phylum: Arthropoda
- Clade: Pancrustacea
- Class: Insecta
- Order: Coleoptera
- Suborder: Adephaga
- Family: Dytiscidae
- Genus: Hydaticus
- Subgenus: Prodaticus
- Species: H. fractifer

Binomial name
- Hydaticus fractifer Walker, 1858

Synonyms
- Hydaticus andamanicus Régimbart, 1899; Hydaticus (Guignotites) fractifer Walker, 1858

Species of beetle

Hydaticus fractifer is a species of predaceous diving beetle found in India, Andaman & Nicobar Islands and Sri Lanka.
