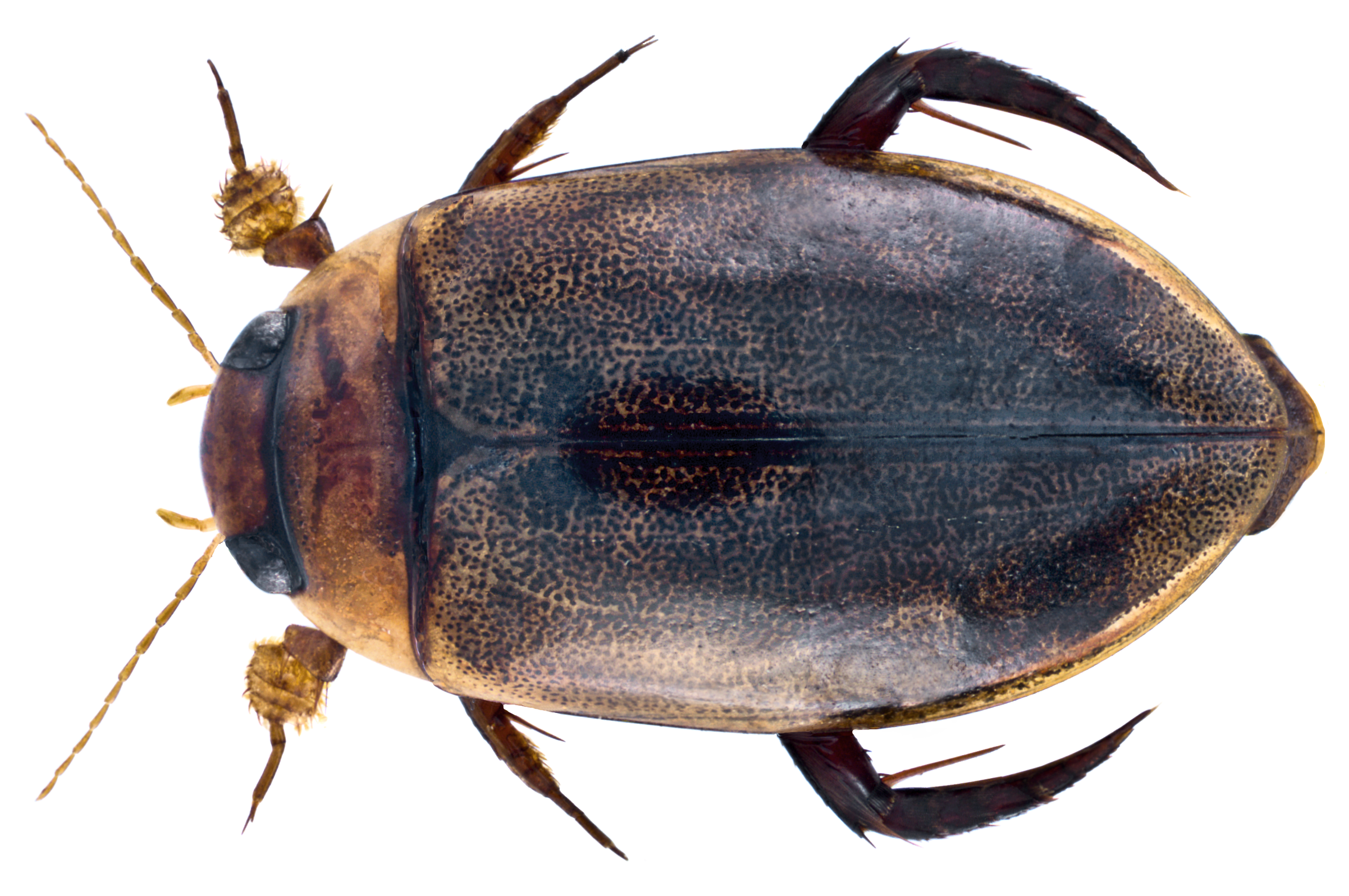

Scientific classification
- Kingdom: Animalia
- Phylum: Arthropoda
- Clade: Pancrustacea
- Class: Insecta
- Order: Coleoptera
- Suborder: Adephaga
- Family: Dytiscidae
- Genus: Hydaticus
- Subgenus: Prodaticus
- Species: H. ricinus

Binomial name
- Hydaticus ricinus Wewalka, 1979

Synonyms
- Hydaticus fabricii Biswas, 2000; Hydaticus (Prodaticus) ricinus Ghosh & Nilsson, 2012

= Hydaticus ricinus =

Species of beetle

Hydaticus ricinus is a species of predaceous diving beetle found in India, Afghanistan, Bhutan, Myanmar, Nepal, Pakistan, Sri Lanka, China, Laos, Thailand, and Vietnam.

== Description ==
Male is about 9.5 mm long.
