= Hydaticus piceus =

Scientific classification
- Domain: Eukaryota
- Kingdom: Animalia
- Phylum: Arthropoda
- Class: Insecta
- Order: Coleoptera
- Suborder: Adephaga
- Family: Dytiscidae
- Genus: Hydaticus
- Species: H. piceus

Binomial name
- Hydaticus piceus LeConte, 1863

Species of beetle

Hydaticus piceus is a species of predaceous diving beetle in the family Dytiscidae. It is found in North America.
