= Hydaticus vittatus =

Scientific classification
- Kingdom: Animalia
- Phylum: Arthropoda
- Clade: Pancrustacea
- Class: Insecta
- Order: Coleoptera
- Suborder: Adephaga
- Family: Dytiscidae
- Genus: Hydaticus
- Subgenus: Prodaticus
- Species: H. vittatus

Binomial name
- Hydaticus vittatus (Fabricius, 1775)

Synonyms
- Dytiscus vittatus Fabricius, 1775; Hydaticus vittatus Aube, 1838; Graphoderus vittatus Motschulsky, 1856; Hydaticus vittatus vittatus Rocchi, 1986; Prodaticus vittatus Miller et al. 2009; Hydaticus vittatus var. angustulus Regimbart, 1899; Hydaticus vittatus angustulus Sato, 1961; Hydaticus vittatus ab. conjungens Guignot, 1954; Graphoderes vittatus lenzi Schonfeldt, 1890; Hydaticus vittatus ab. lenzi Zimmermann, 1920; Hydaticus lenzi Sato, 1961; Hydaticus lenzi conjungens Sato, 1961; Hydaticus lenzi nepalensis Sato, 1961; Hydaticus lenzi nepalensis f. swani Sato, 1961; Hydaticus sesquivittatus Fairmaire, 1880; Hydaticus leechi Mukhopadhyay & Ghosh, 2003

Species of beetle

Hydaticus vittatus is a species of predaceous diving beetle found in India, Pakistan, Sri Lanka, Nepal, Bangladesh, Bhutan, Myanmar, China, Japan, Taiwan, Thailand, Cambodia, Laos, Vietnam, Malaysia and Indonesia.

== Description ==
The beetle has a highly variable body shape characterized by geographic variations, with a typical body length ranging from 11.3 to 14.6 mm. The head is blackish, becoming variably yellow anteriorly. The pronotum is also black, but yellowish laterally. The elytra have two bright golden yellow longitudinal lateral stripes in the basal half. Large black markings occur on the elytra and pronotum. The yellow stripes on the lateral sides of the pronotum are narrow. In males, the aedeagus in lateral view lacks a longitudinal ridge near the ventral margin in the apical third. The posterior margins of the first four segments of hind tarsi are transversely lined with a coarse fringe of flat, adpressed, golden-yellow setae.

== Biology ==
Adults are inhabited in rain water pools, muddy buffalo wallows with grassy margins, fish ponds, small streams, puddles on roads, ditches in forests and artificial pools and paddy fields.

== Subspecies ==
Two subspecies identified.

- Hydaticus vittatus angustulus Régimbart, 1899
- Hydaticus vittatus vittatus (Fabricius, 1775)
