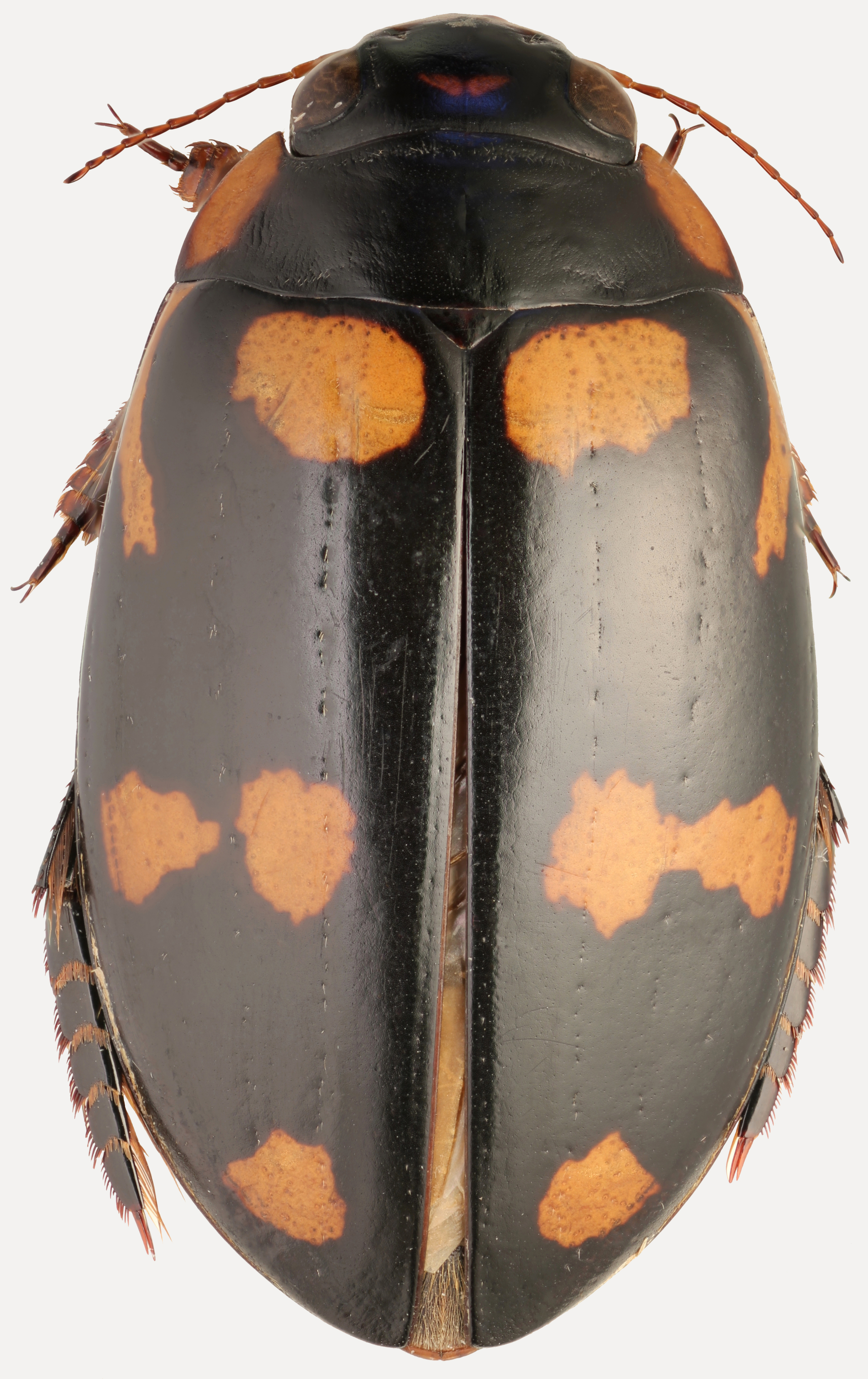
- Prodaticus pictus

Scientific classification
- Kingdom: Animalia
- Phylum: Arthropoda
- Clade: Pancrustacea
- Class: Insecta
- Order: Coleoptera
- Suborder: Adephaga
- Family: Dytiscidae
- Genus: Hydaticus
- Subgenus: Prodaticus; Sharp, 1882

= Prodaticus =

Subgenus of beetles

Prodaticus is a subgenus of beetles of the genus Hydaticus in the family Dytiscidae. These 143 species are in the subgenus Prodaticus:

- Hydaticus abyssinicus Régimbart, 1905
- Hydaticus aequabilis Guignot, 1958
- Hydaticus aequalis Benetti, Gustafson, Hamada & Short, 2020
- Hydaticus africanus (Rocchi, 1976)
- Hydaticus agaboides Sharp, 1882
- Hydaticus amydrus Guignot, 1955
- Hydaticus apiatus Guignot, 1947
- Hydaticus arcuatus Régimbart, 1895
- Hydaticus balkei Wewalka, 2015
- Hydaticus basicollis Régimbart, 1905
- Hydaticus batchianensis Sharp, 1882
- Hydaticus bengalensis Régimbart, 1899
- Hydaticus bihamatus Aubé, 1838
- Hydaticus bimarginatus (Say, 1830)
- Hydaticus bipunctatus Wehncke, 1876
- Hydaticus bitalensis Guignot, 1952
- Hydaticus bivittatus Laporte, 1835
- Hydaticus bowringii Clark, 1864
- Hydaticus caffer Boheman, 1848
- Hydaticus capicola Aubé, 1838
- Hydaticus chrisi Nilsson, 2001
- Hydaticus collarti Guignot, 1848
- Hydaticus concolor Sharp, 1882
- Hydaticus congo Gschwendtner, 1938
- Hydaticus conjungens Régimbart, 1899
- Hydaticus consanguineus Aubé, 1838
- Hydaticus daemeli Wehncke, 1876
- Hydaticus decorus Klug, 1834
- Hydaticus devexus Trémouilles, 1996
- Hydaticus dhofarensis Pederzani, 2003
- Hydaticus dineutoides Sharp, 1882
- Hydaticus dintelmanni Balke, Hendrich, Sagata & Wewalka, 2005
- Hydaticus discindens Walker, 1858
- Hydaticus dorsiger Aubé, 1838
- Hydaticus dregei Aubé, 1838
- Hydaticus ephippiiger Régimbart, 1899
- Hydaticus epipleuricus Régimbart, 1891
- Hydaticus exclamationis Aubé, 1838
- Hydaticus fabricii (W.S. Macleay, 1825)
- Hydaticus figuratus Régimbart, 1899
- Hydaticus fijiensis Régimbart, 1899
- Hydaticus flavolineatus Boheman, 1848
- Hydaticus fractifer Walker, 1858
- Hydaticus fractivittis Guignot, 1951
- Hydaticus fulvoguttatus Guignot, 1951
- Hydaticus fulvosparsus Gschwendtner, 1938
- Hydaticus galla Guérin-Méneville, 1847
- Hydaticus grammicus (Germar, 1827)
- Hydaticus guignoti Gschwendtner, 1938
- Hydaticus hajeki Wewalka, 2015
- Hydaticus hauthi Hendrich & Balke, 2020
- Hydaticus hendrichi Wewalka, 2015
- Hydaticus histrio Clark, 1864
- Hydaticus humeralis Régimbart, 1895
- Hydaticus incertus Régimbart, 1888
- Hydaticus ineptus Guignot, 1953
- Hydaticus inexspectatus Trémouilles, 1996
- Hydaticus intermedius Régimbart, 1895
- Hydaticus interrogator Mouchamps, 1957
- Hydaticus jaechi Wewalka, 2016
- Hydaticus jaenneli Guignot, 1936
- Hydaticus kolbei Branden, 1885
- Hydaticus kourouensis Hendrich & Balke, 2020
- Hydaticus laceratus Régimbart, 1895
- Hydaticus laetabilis Régimbart, 1899
- Hydaticus laosensis Wewalka, 2016
- Hydaticus larsoni Wewalka, 2015
- Hydaticus lateralis Laporte, 1835
- Hydaticus latior Régimbart, 1895
- Hydaticus lativittis Régimbart, 1895
- Hydaticus leander (Rossi, 1790)
- Hydaticus lepemangoyei Bilardo & Rocchi, 2018
- Hydaticus limnetes Guignot, 1955
- Hydaticus litigiosus Régimbart, 1880
- Hydaticus luczonicus Aubé, 1838
- Hydaticus macularis Régimbart, 1899
- Hydaticus madagascariensis Aubé, 1838
- Hydaticus major Régimbart, 1899
- Hydaticus manueli Wewalka & Jäch, 2018
- Hydaticus marlenae Wewalka, 2015
- Hydaticus matruelis Clark, 1864
- Hydaticus mexaformis Wewalka, 1979
- Hydaticus microdaemeli Watts, 1978
- Hydaticus mocquerysi Régimbart, 1895
- Hydaticus musivus Guignot, 1952
- Hydaticus natalensis Guignot, 1951
- Hydaticus nigritulus Régimbart, 1899
- Hydaticus nigrotaeniatus Régimbart, 1895
- Hydaticus okalehubyi Balke & Hendrich, 1992
- Hydaticus opaculus Gschwendtner, 1933
- Hydaticus ornatus H.J. Kolbe, 1883
- Hydaticus pacificus Aubé, 1838
- Hydaticus paganus Clark, 1864
- Hydaticus palliatus Aubé, 1838
- Hydaticus panguana Megna, Balke, Apenborn & Hendrich, 2019
- Hydaticus parallelus Clark, 1864
- Hydaticus pauli Wewaulka, 2016
- Hydaticus peregrinus Guignot, 1948
- Hydaticus pescheti Gschwendtner, 1930
- Hydaticus petitii Aubé, 1838
- Hydaticus philippensis Wehncke, 1876
- Hydaticus pictus (Sharp, 1882)
- Hydaticus plagiatus Régimbart, 1895
- Hydaticus platamboides Régimbart, 1895
- Hydaticus platteeuwi Severin, 1890
- Hydaticus poecilus Régimbart, 1895
- Hydaticus ponticus Sharp, 1882
- Hydaticus pulcher (Clark, 1863)
- Hydaticus pullatus Guignot, 1952
- Hydaticus quadriguttatus Régimbart, 1895
- Hydaticus quadrivittatus Blanchard, 1843
- Hydaticus rhantaticoides Régimbart, 1892
- Hydaticus rhantoides Sharp, 1882
- Hydaticus ricinus Wewalka, 1979
- ?Hydaticus riehli Wehncke, 1876
- Hydaticus rimosus Aubé, 1838
- Hydaticus rivanolis Wewalka, 1979
- ?Hydaticus rochei Camerano, 1907
- Hydaticus saecularis Pederzani, 1982
- Hydaticus scapularis Guignot, 1952
- Hydaticus sellatus Régimbart, 1883
- Hydaticus septemlineatus Zimmermann, 1928
- Hydaticus servillianus Aubé, 1838
- Hydaticus severini Régimbart, 1895
- Hydaticus sexguttatus Régimbart, 1899
- Hydaticus sobrinus Aubé, 1838
- Hydaticus speciosus Régimbart, 1895
- Hydaticus stappersi Peschet, 1915
- Hydaticus stastnyi Wewalka, 2015
- Hydaticus subfasciatus Laporte, 1835
- ?Hydaticus subsignatus Harold, 1879
- Hydaticus suffusus Régimbart, 1892
- Hydaticus tenuis Gschwendtner, 1938
- Hydaticus testudinarius Régimbart, 1895
- Hydaticus thermonectoides Sharp, 1884
- Hydaticus tibetanus Shaverdo, Wewalka & Li, 2012
- Hydaticus torosus Guignot, 1947
- Hydaticus tschoffeni Régimbart, 1895
- Hydaticus tuyuensis Trémouilles, 1996
- Hydaticus ugandaensis Guignot, 1936
- Hydaticus ussherii Clark, 1864
- Hydaticus vaziranii Wewalka, 1979
- ?Hydaticus verecundus Clark, 1864
- Hydaticus vittatus (Fabricius, 1775)
- Hydaticus vitticollis Régimbart, 1895
- Hydaticus xanthomelas (Brullé, 1837)
- Hydaticus zetteli Wewalka, 2016
