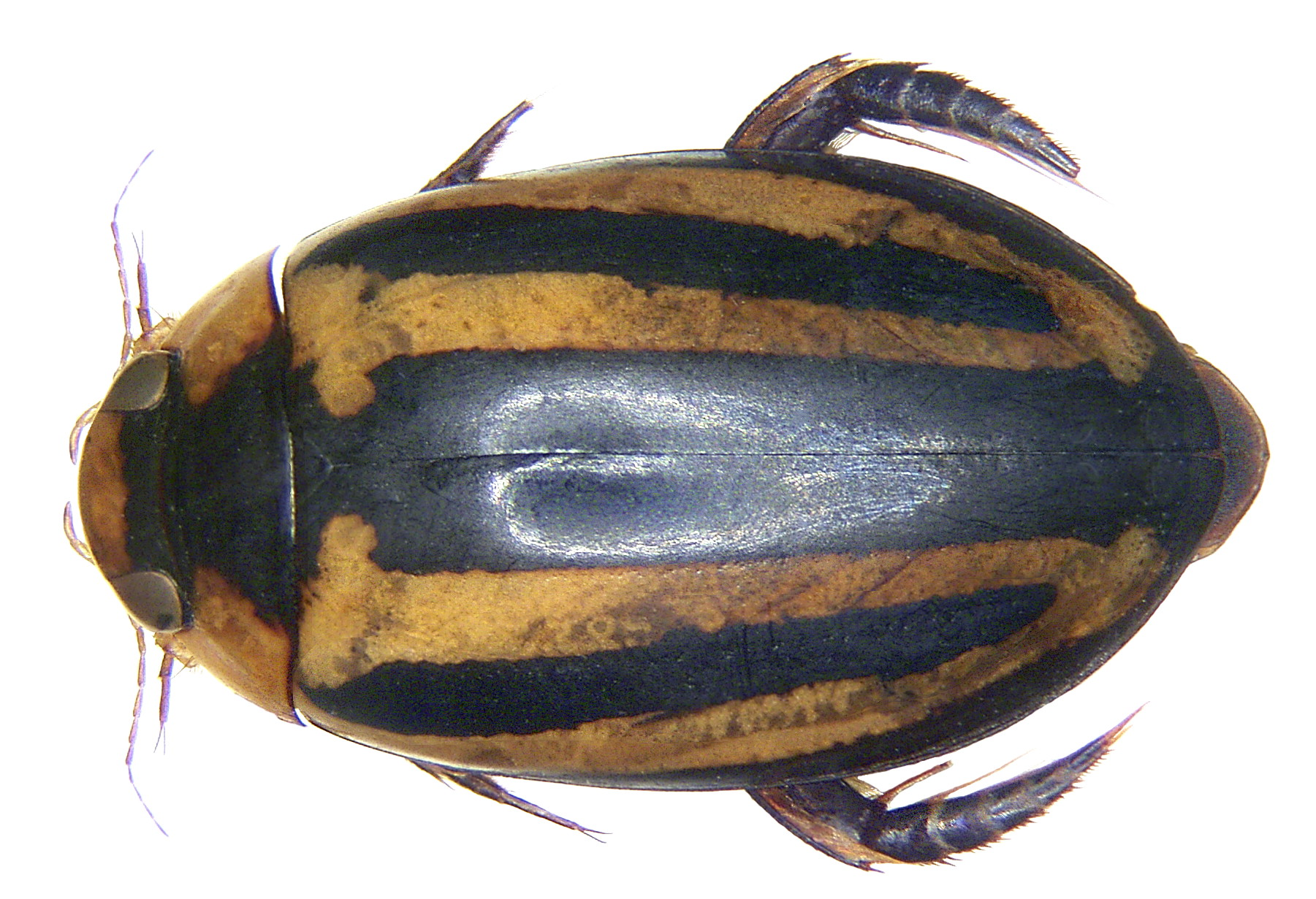
- H. histrio

Scientific classification
- Domain: Eukaryota
- Kingdom: Animalia
- Phylum: Arthropoda
- Class: Insecta
- Order: Coleoptera
- Suborder: Adephaga
- Family: Dytiscidae
- Tribe: Hydaticini
- Genus: Hydaticus; Leach, 1817

= Hydaticus =

Genus of beetles

Hydaticus is a genus of predatory water beetle belonging to the family Dytiscidae. Hydaticus can be found throughout most of the world. There are 150 described species and 12 subspecies in two subgenera in the genus Hydaticus.

== Subgenus Hydaticus ==
These seven species are in the subgenus Hydaticus:

- Hydaticus aruspex Clark, 1864
- Hydaticus cinctipennis Aubé, 1838
- Hydaticus continentalis J. Balfour-Brown, 1944
- Hydaticus piceus LeConte, 1863
- Hydaticus schelkovnikovi Zaitzev, 1913
- Hydaticus seminiger (De Geer, 1774)
- Hydaticus transversalis (Pontoppidan, 1763)

== Subgenus Prodaticus ==
These 143 species are in the subgenus Prodaticus:

- Hydaticus abyssinicus Régimbart, 1905
- Hydaticus aequabilis Guignot, 1958
- Hydaticus aequalis Benetti, Gustafson, Hamada & Short, 2020
- Hydaticus africanus (Rocchi, 1976)
- Hydaticus agaboides Sharp, 1882
- Hydaticus amydrus Guignot, 1955
- Hydaticus apiatus Guignot, 1947
- Hydaticus arcuatus Régimbart, 1895
- Hydaticus balkei Wewalka, 2015
- Hydaticus basicollis Régimbart, 1905
- Hydaticus batchianensis Sharp, 1882
- Hydaticus bengalensis Régimbart, 1899
- Hydaticus bihamatus Aubé, 1838
- Hydaticus bimarginatus (Say, 1830)
- Hydaticus bipunctatus Wehncke, 1876
- Hydaticus bitalensis Guignot, 1952
- Hydaticus bivittatus Laporte, 1835
- Hydaticus bowringii Clark, 1864
- Hydaticus caffer Boheman, 1848
- Hydaticus capicola Aubé, 1838
- Hydaticus chrisi Nilsson, 2001
- Hydaticus collarti Guignot, 1848
- Hydaticus concolor Sharp, 1882
- Hydaticus congo Gschwendtner, 1938
- Hydaticus conjungens Régimbart, 1899
- Hydaticus consanguineus Aubé, 1838
- Hydaticus daemeli Wehncke, 1876
- Hydaticus decorus Klug, 1834
- Hydaticus devexus Trémouilles, 1996
- Hydaticus dhofarensis Pederzani, 2003
- Hydaticus dineutoides Sharp, 1882
- Hydaticus dintelmanni Balke, Hendrich, Sagata & Wewalka, 2005
- Hydaticus discindens Walker, 1858
- Hydaticus dorsiger Aubé, 1838
- Hydaticus dregei Aubé, 1838
- Hydaticus ephippiiger Régimbart, 1899
- Hydaticus epipleuricus Régimbart, 1891
- Hydaticus exclamationis Aubé, 1838
- Hydaticus fabricii (W.S. Macleay, 1825)
- Hydaticus figuratus Régimbart, 1899
- Hydaticus fijiensis Régimbart, 1899
- Hydaticus flavolineatus Boheman, 1848
- Hydaticus fractifer Walker, 1858
- Hydaticus fractivittis Guignot, 1951
- Hydaticus fulvoguttatus Guignot, 1951
- Hydaticus fulvosparsus Gschwendtner, 1938
- Hydaticus galla Guérin-Méneville, 1847
- Hydaticus grammicus (Germar, 1827)
- Hydaticus guignoti Gschwendtner, 1938
- Hydaticus hajeki Wewalka, 2015
- Hydaticus hauthi Hendrich & Balke, 2020
- Hydaticus hendrichi Wewalka, 2015
- Hydaticus histrio Clark, 1864
- Hydaticus humeralis Régimbart, 1895
- Hydaticus incertus Régimbart, 1888
- Hydaticus ineptus Guignot, 1953
- Hydaticus inexspectatus Trémouilles, 1996
- Hydaticus intermedius Régimbart, 1895
- Hydaticus interrogator Mouchamps, 1957
- Hydaticus jaechi Wewalka, 2016
- Hydaticus jaenneli Guignot, 1936
- Hydaticus kolbei Branden, 1885
- Hydaticus kourouensis Hendrich & Balke, 2020
- Hydaticus laceratus Régimbart, 1895
- Hydaticus laetabilis Régimbart, 1899
- Hydaticus laosensis Wewalka, 2016
- Hydaticus larsoni Wewalka, 2015
- Hydaticus lateralis Laporte, 1835
- Hydaticus latior Régimbart, 1895
- Hydaticus lativittis Régimbart, 1895
- Hydaticus leander (Rossi, 1790)
- Hydaticus lepemangoyei Bilardo & Rocchi, 2018
- Hydaticus limnetes Guignot, 1955
- Hydaticus litigiosus Régimbart, 1880
- Hydaticus luczonicus Aubé, 1838
- Hydaticus macularis Régimbart, 1899
- Hydaticus madagascariensis Aubé, 1838
- Hydaticus major Régimbart, 1899
- Hydaticus manueli Wewalka & Jäch, 2018
- Hydaticus marlenae Wewalka, 2015
- Hydaticus matruelis Clark, 1864
- Hydaticus mexaformis Wewalka, 1979
- Hydaticus microdaemeli Watts, 1978
- Hydaticus mocquerysi Régimbart, 1895
- Hydaticus musivus Guignot, 1952
- Hydaticus natalensis Guignot, 1951
- Hydaticus nigritulus Régimbart, 1899
- Hydaticus nigrotaeniatus Régimbart, 1895
- Hydaticus okalehubyi Balke & Hendrich, 1992
- Hydaticus opaculus Gschwendtner, 1933
- Hydaticus ornatus H.J. Kolbe, 1883
- Hydaticus pacificus Aubé, 1838
- Hydaticus paganus Clark, 1864
- Hydaticus palliatus Aubé, 1838
- Hydaticus panguana Megna, Balke, Apenborn & Hendrich, 2019
- Hydaticus parallelus Clark, 1864
- Hydaticus pauli Wewaulka, 2016
- Hydaticus peregrinus Guignot, 1948
- Hydaticus pescheti Gschwendtner, 1930
- Hydaticus petitii Aubé, 1838
- Hydaticus philippensis Wehncke, 1876
- Hydaticus pictus (Sharp, 1882)
- Hydaticus plagiatus Régimbart, 1895
- Hydaticus platamboides Régimbart, 1895
- Hydaticus platteeuwi Severin, 1890
- Hydaticus poecilus Régimbart, 1895
- Hydaticus ponticus Sharp, 1882
- Hydaticus pulcher (Clark, 1863)
- Hydaticus pullatus Guignot, 1952
- Hydaticus quadriguttatus Régimbart, 1895
- Hydaticus quadrivittatus Blanchard, 1843
- Hydaticus rhantaticoides Régimbart, 1892
- Hydaticus rhantoides Sharp, 1882
- Hydaticus ricinus Wewalka, 1979
- ?Hydaticus riehli Wehncke, 1876
- Hydaticus rimosus Aubé, 1838
- Hydaticus rivanolis Wewalka, 1979
- ?Hydaticus rochei Camerano, 1907
- Hydaticus saecularis Pederzani, 1982
- Hydaticus scapularis Guignot, 1952
- Hydaticus sellatus Régimbart, 1883
- Hydaticus septemlineatus Zimmermann, 1928
- Hydaticus servillianus Aubé, 1838
- Hydaticus severini Régimbart, 1895
- Hydaticus sexguttatus Régimbart, 1899
- Hydaticus sobrinus Aubé, 1838
- Hydaticus speciosus Régimbart, 1895
- Hydaticus stappersi Peschet, 1915
- Hydaticus stastnyi Wewalka, 2015
- Hydaticus subfasciatus Laporte, 1835
- ?Hydaticus subsignatus Harold, 1879
- Hydaticus suffusus Régimbart, 1892
- Hydaticus tenuis Gschwendtner, 1938
- Hydaticus testudinarius Régimbart, 1895
- Hydaticus thermonectoides Sharp, 1884
- Hydaticus tibetanus Shaverdo, Wewalka & Li, 2012
- Hydaticus torosus Guignot, 1947
- Hydaticus tschoffeni Régimbart, 1895
- Hydaticus tuyuensis Trémouilles, 1996
- Hydaticus ugandaensis Guignot, 1936
- Hydaticus ussherii Clark, 1864
- Hydaticus vaziranii Wewalka, 1979
- ?Hydaticus verecundus Clark, 1864
- Hydaticus vittatus (Fabricius, 1775)
- Hydaticus vitticollis Régimbart, 1895
- Hydaticus xanthomelas (Brullé, 1837)
- Hydaticus zetteli Wewalka, 2016
