= List of Philodromidae species =

This page lists all described species of the spider family Philodromidae accepted by the World Spider Catalog as of February 2021:

== A ==
=== Apollophanes ===
Apollophanes O. Pickard-Cambridge, 1898

- A. aztecanus Dondale & Redner, 1975 — Mexico
- A. bangalores Tikader, 1963 — India
- A. caribaeus Dondale & Redner, 1975 — Trinidad
- A. crispus Dondale & Redner, 1975 — Panama
- A. erectus Dondale & Redner, 1975 — Mexico
- A. fitzroyi Baert, 2013 — Ecuador (Galapagos Is.)
- A. gaucho Francisco, Ott & Teixeira, 2016 — Brazil
- A. indistinctus Gertsch, 1933 — Mexico
- A. lonesomegeorgei Baert, 2013 — Ecuador (Galapagos Is.)
- A. longipes (O. Pickard-Cambridge, 1896) — Mexico
- A. macropalpus (Paik, 1979) — Russia (West Siberia to Far East), Korea
- A. margareta Lowrie & Gertsch, 1955 — USA, Canada
- A. punctatus (Bryant, 1948) — Hispaniola
- A. punctipes (O. Pickard-Cambridge, 1891) (type) — USA to Panama
- A. texanus Banks, 1904 — USA, Mexico

== B ==
=== Bacillocnemis ===
Bacillocnemis Mello-Leitão, 1938

- B. anomala Mello-Leitão, 1938 (type) — Argentina

=== Berlandiella ===
Berlandiella Mello-Leitão, 1929

- B. insignis Mello-Leitão, 1929 (type) — Brazil
- B. magna Mello-Leitão, 1929 — Brazil
- B. meridionalis Lise & Silva, 2011 — Brazil
- B. polyacantha Mello-Leitão, 1929 — Brazil
- B. querencia Lise & Silva, 2011 — Brazil
- B. robertae Lise & Silva, 2011 — Brazil, Argentina
- B. zabele Pantoja, Drago-Bisneto & Saturnino, 2020 — Brazil

== C ==
=== Celerrimus ===
Celerrimus Lecigne, Cornic, Oger & Van Keer, 2019

- C. duffeyi Lecigne, 2019 (type) — Spain, France

=== Cleocnemis ===
Cleocnemis Simon, 1886

- C. bryantae (Gertsch, 1933) — Paraguay
- C. heteropoda Simon, 1886 (type) — Brazil
- C. lanceolata Mello-Leitão, 1929 — Brazil
- C. moschata Mello-Leitão, 1943 — Brazil
- C. mutilata (Mello-Leitão, 1917) — Brazil
- C. nigra Mello-Leitão, 1943 — Brazil
- C. paraguensis (Gertsch, 1933) — Paraguay
- C. punctulata (Taczanowski, 1872) — Peru, Venezuela, Guyana
- C. rosea Mello-Leitão, 1944 — Argentina
- C. rudolphi Mello-Leitão, 1943 — Brazil
- C. serrana Mello-Leitão, 1929 — Brazil
- C. spinosa Mello-Leitão, 1947 — Brazil
- C. taquarae (Keyserling, 1891) — Peru, Brazil
- C. xenotypa Mello-Leitão, 1929 — Brazil

=== † Cretadromus ===
† Cretadromus Cheng et al., 2009

- † C. liaoningensis Cheng et al., 2009

== E ==
=== Ebo ===
Ebo

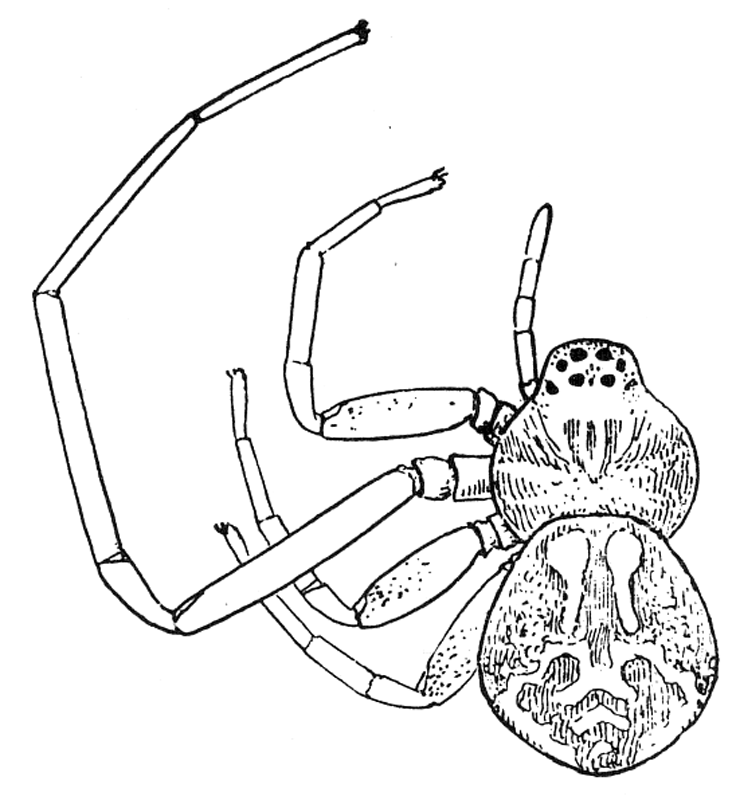
Ebo latithorax

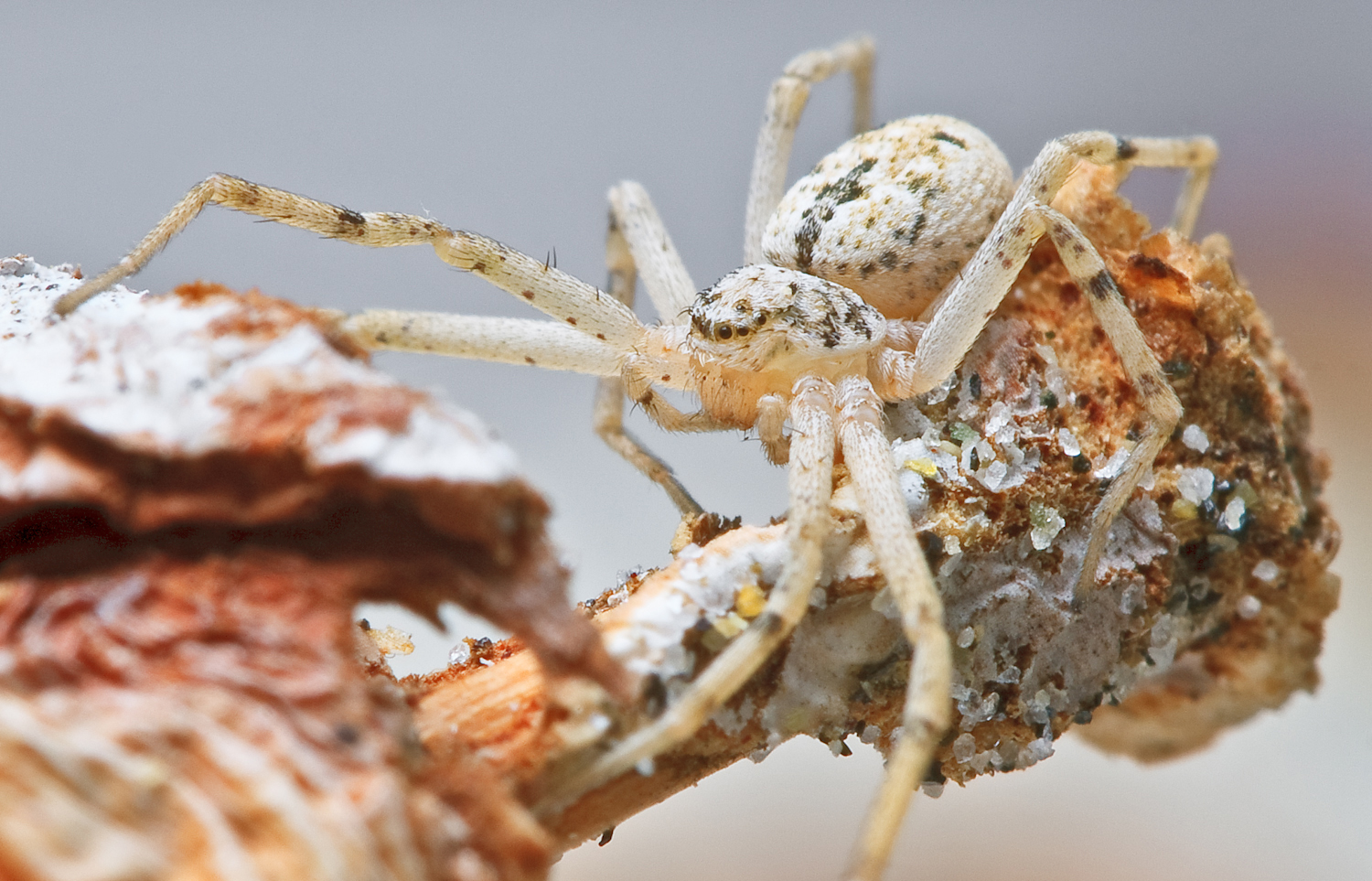
Ebo pepinensis, female

Ebo Keyserling, 1884

- E. bharatae Tikader, 1965 — India (mainland, Andaman Is.)
- E. bucklei Platnick, 1972 — Canada
- E. carmineus Mello-Leitão, 1944 — Argentina
- E. contrastus Sauer & Platnick, 1972 — USA
- E. distinctivus Lyakhov, 1992 — Kazakhstan, Russia (South Siberia)
- E. evansae Sauer & Platnick, 1972 — USA, Mexico
- E. fuscus Mello-Leitão, 1943 — Argentina
- E. iviei Sauer & Platnick, 1972 — USA, Canada
- E. latithorax Keyserling, 1884 (type) — USA, Canada
- E. meridionalis Mello-Leitão, 1942 — Argentina
- E. merkeli Schick, 1965 — USA
- E. pepinensis Gertsch, 1933 — USA, Canada
- E. punctatus Sauer & Platnick, 1972 — USA

=== Eminella ===
Eminella Özdikmen, 2007

- E. ctenops (Mello-Leitão, 1940) (type) — Argentina

=== † Eothanatus ===
† Eothanatus Petrunkevitch, 1950

- † E. diritatis Petrunkevitch, 1950

== F ==
=== Fageia ===
Fageia Mello-Leitão, 1929

- F. amabilis Mello-Leitão, 1929 (type) — Brazil
- F. clara Mello-Leitão, 1937 — Brazil
- F. concolor Mello-Leitão, 1947 — Brazil
- F. meridionalis Mello-Leitão, 1943 — Brazil

== G ==
=== Gephyrellula ===
Gephyrellula Strand, 1932

- G. violacea (Mello-Leitão, 1918) (type) — Brazil

=== Gephyrina ===
Gephyrina Simon, 1895

- G. alba Simon, 1895 (type) — Venezuela
- G. albimarginata Mello-Leitão, 1929 — Brazil
- G. imbecilla Mello-Leitão, 1917 — Brazil
- G. insularis Simon, 1898 — St. Vincent
- G. nigropunctata Mello-Leitão, 1929 — Brazil, Bolivia

=== Gephyrota ===
Gephyrota Strand, 1932

- G. candida (Simon, 1895) — Cambodia, Vietnam
- G. glauca (Jézéquel, 1966) — Ivory Coast
- G. limbata (L. Koch, 1875) (type) — Australia (Queensland)
- G. nigrolineata (Simon, 1909) — Vietnam
- G. pudica (Simon, 1906) — India
- G. virescens (Simon, 1906) — Sri Lanka
- G. viridipallida (Schmidt, 1956) — Cameroon

== H ==
=== Halodromus ===
Halodromus Muster, 2009

- H. barbarae Muster, 2009 — Canary Is., Spain, Egypt, Israel, Saudi Arabia
- H. deltshevi Muster, 2009 — Yemen
- H. gershomi Muster, 2009 — Eritrea
- H. patellaris (Wunderlich, 1987) — Cape Verde Is., Canary Is., Spain, Tunisia, Israel
- H. patellidens (Levy, 1977) (type) — Cape Verde, Algeria to Middle East
- H. vanharteni Logunov, 2011 — United Arab Emirates

=== Hirriusa ===
Hirriusa Strand, 1932

- H. arenacea (Lawrence, 1927) — Namibia
- H. bidentata (Lawrence, 1927) — Namibia
- H. variegata (Simon, 1895) (type) — South Africa

== M ==
=== Metacleocnemis ===
Metacleocnemis Mello-Leitão, 1929

- M. borgmeyeri Mello-Leitão, 1929 (type) — Brazil

== P ==
=== Pagiopalus ===
Pagiopalus

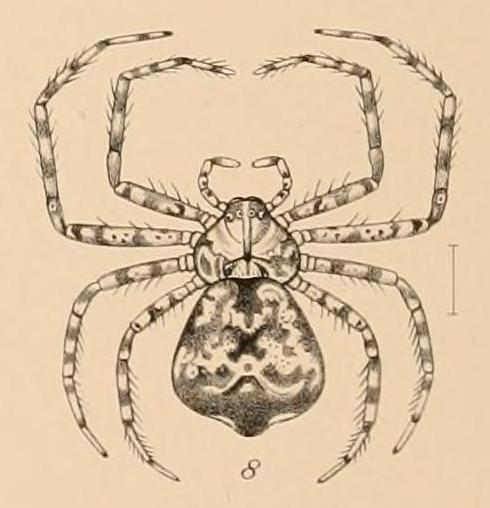
Pagiopalus personatus

Pagiopalus Simon, 1900

- P. apiculus Suman, 1971 — Hawaii
- P. atomarius Simon, 1900 (type) — Hawaii
- P. nigriventris Simon, 1900 — Hawaii
- P. personatus Simon, 1900 — Hawaii

=== Paracleocnemis ===
Paracleocnemis Schiapelli & Gerschman, 1942

- P. apostoli Mello-Leitão, 1945 — Argentina
- P. termalis Schiapelli & Gerschman, 1942 (type) — Argentina

=== Pedinopistha ===
Pedinopistha Karsch, 1880

- P. aculeata (Simon, 1900) — Hawaii
- P. finschi Karsch, 1880 (type) — Hawaii
- P. longula (Simon, 1900) — Hawaii
- P. schauinslandi (Simon, 1899) — Hawaii
- P. stigmatica (Simon, 1900) — Hawaii

=== Petrichus ===
Petrichus Simon, 1886

- P. cinereus Tullgren, 1901 — Argentina
- P. corticinus Mello-Leitão, 1944 — Argentina
- P. fuliginosus (Nicolet, 1849) — Chile
- P. funebris (Nicolet, 1849) — Chile
- P. griseus Berland, 1913 — Ecuador
- P. junior (Nicolet, 1849) — Chile
- P. lancearius Simon, 1905 — Argentina
- P. luteus (Nicolet, 1849) — Chile
- P. marmoratus Simon, 1886 (type) — Argentina
- P. meridionalis (Keyserling, 1891) — Brazil
- P. niveus (Simon, 1895) — Argentina, Falkland Is.
- P. ornatus Schiapelli & Gerschman, 1942 — Argentina
- P. sordidus Tullgren, 1901 — Argentina
- P. tobioides Mello-Leitão, 1941 — Argentina
- P. tullgreni Simon, 1902 — Argentina
- P. zonatus Tullgren, 1901 — Argentina

=== † Philodromidites ===
† Philodromidites Straus, 1967

- † P. hercynicus Straus, 1967

=== Philodromops ===
Philodromops Mello-Leitão, 1943

- P. coccineus Mello-Leitão, 1943 (type) — Brazil

=== Philodromus ===
Philodromus

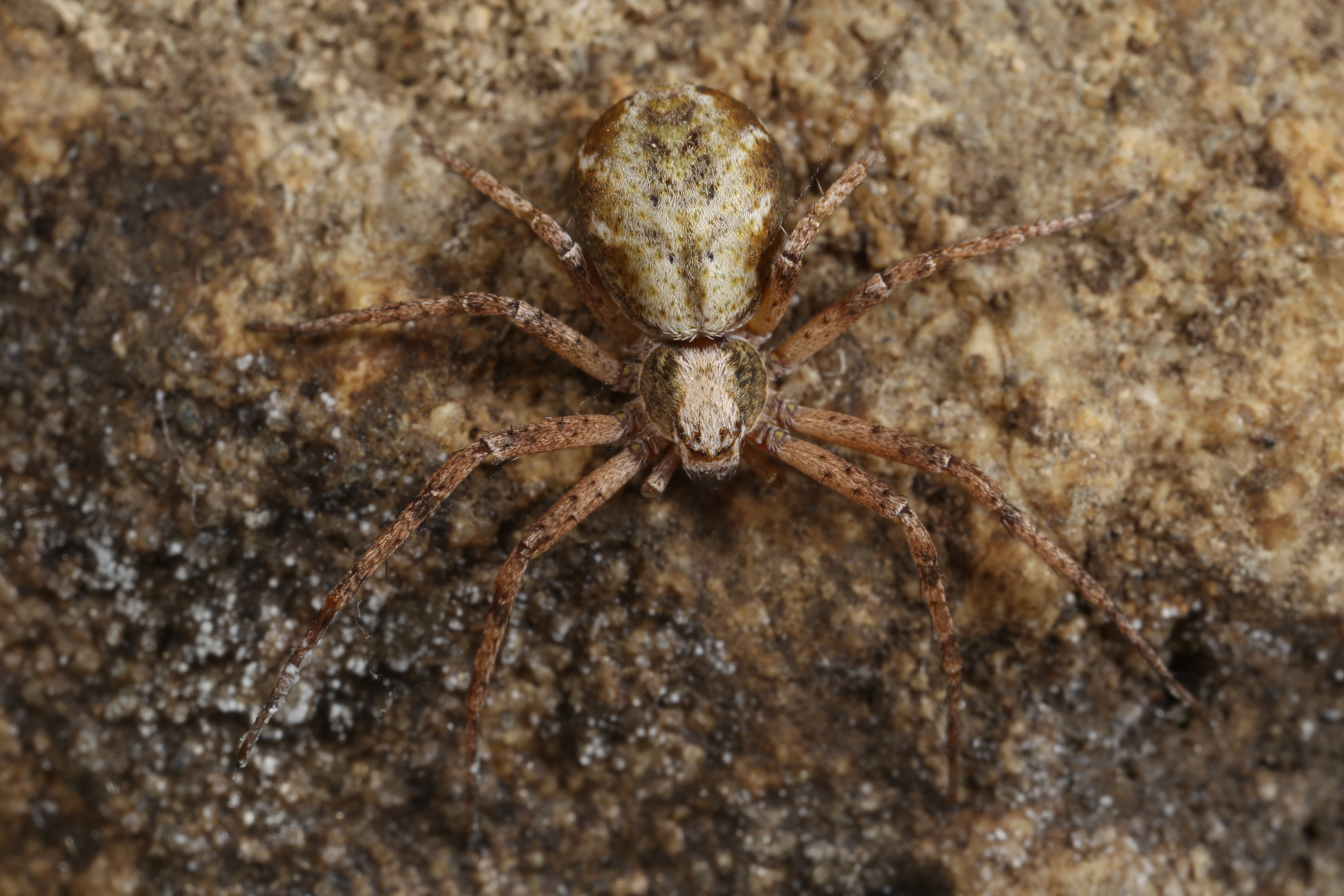
Wandering crab spider
(Philodromus aureolus)

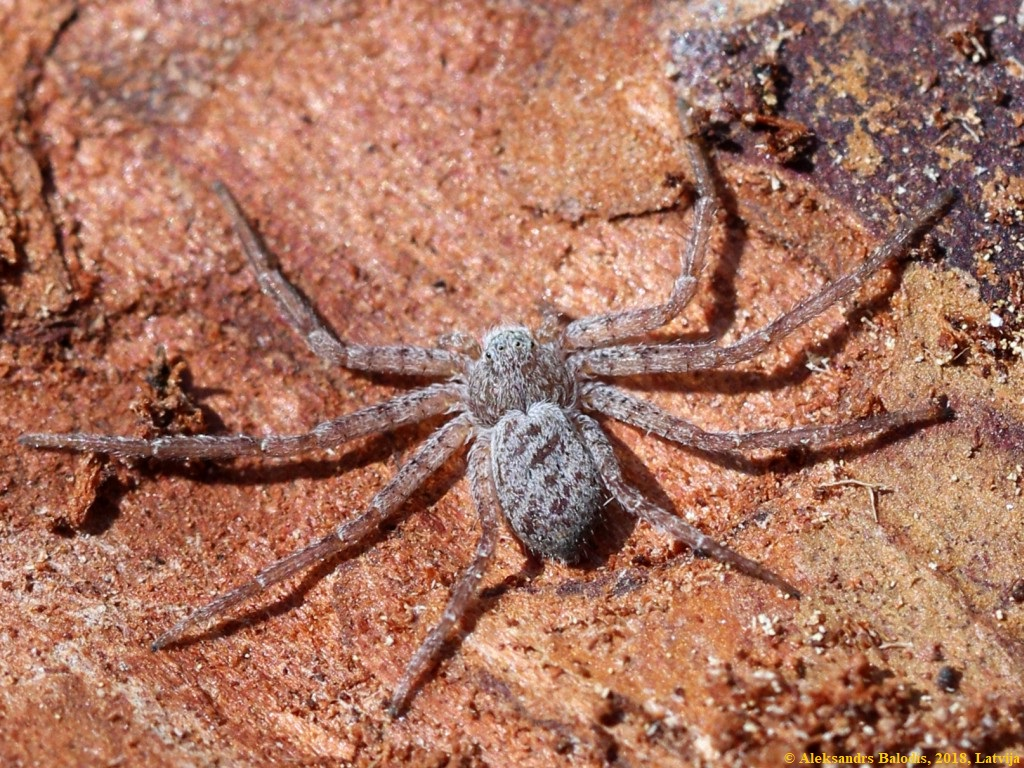
Philodromus fuscomarginatus

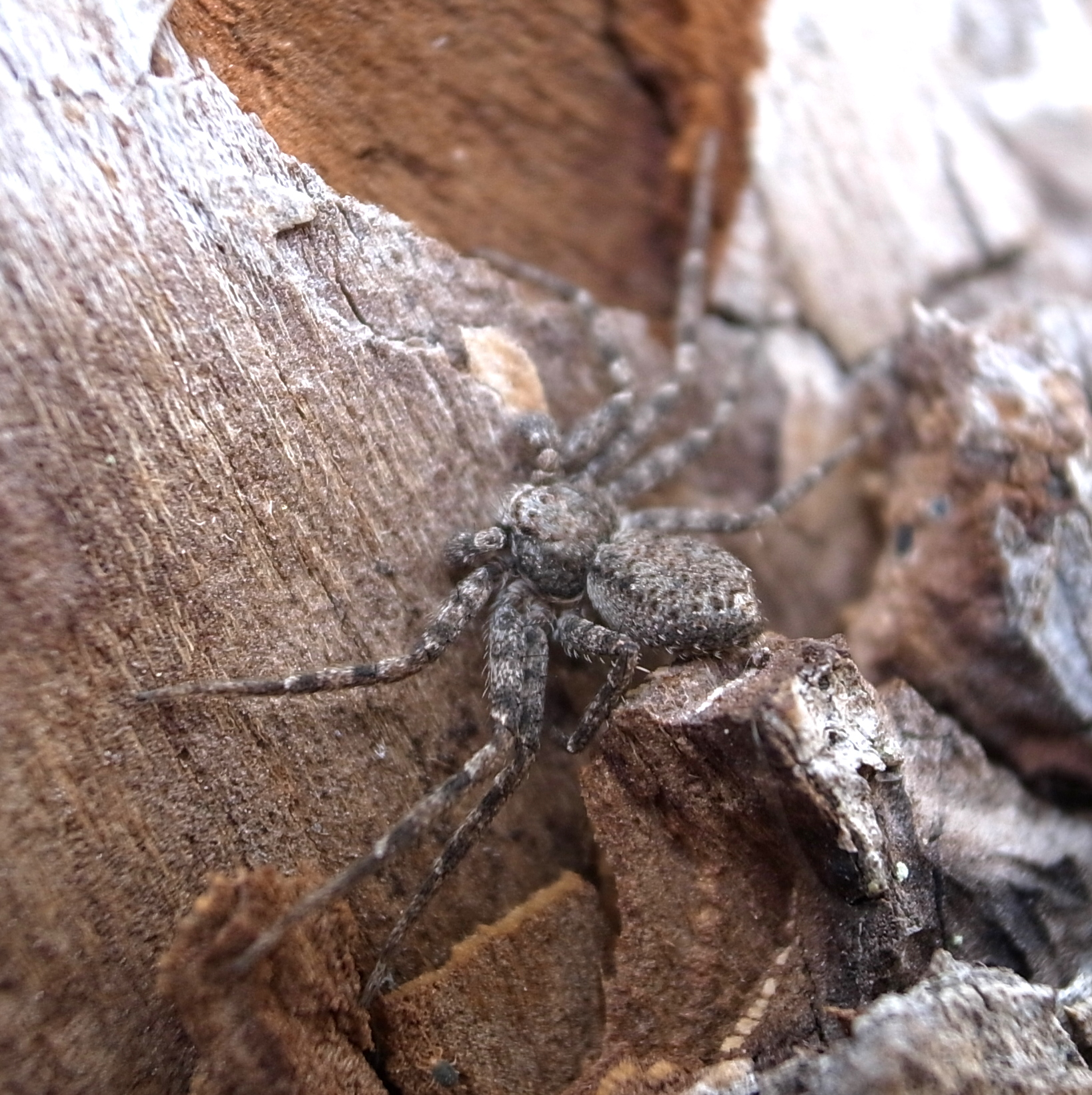
Philodromus spinitarsis

Philodromus Walckenaer, 1826

- P. albicans O. Pickard-Cambridge, 1897 — Mexico
- P. albidus Kulczyński, 1911 — Europe, Turkey, Caucasus
- P. albofrenatus Simon, 1907 — Equatorial Guinea (Bioko)
- P. albolimbatus Thorell, 1895 — Myanmar
- P. alboniger Caporiacco, 1949 — Kenya
- P. aliensis Hu, 2001 — China
- P. anomalus Gertsch, 1934 — USA
- P. archettii Caporiacco, 1941 — Ethiopia
- P. arizonensis Dondale & Redner, 1969 — USA, Mexico
- P. aryy Marusik, 1991 — Russia (Urals to Far East), China
- P. ashae Gajbe & Gajbe, 1999 — India
- P. assamensis Tikader, 1962 — India, China
- P. aureolus (Clerck, 1757) (type) — Europe, Turkey, Caucasus, Russia (Europe to Central Asia and Middle Siberia), Kazakhstan, Iran, Central Asia, Mongolia, China, Korea, Japan
- P. auricomus L. Koch, 1878 — Russia (Far East), China, Korea, Japan
- P. austerus (L. Koch, 1876) — Australia (Queensland)
- P. azcursor Logunov & Huseynov, 2008 — Azerbaijan
- P. barmani Tikader, 1980 — India
- P. barrowsi Gertsch, 1934 — USA
- P. betrabatai Tikader, 1966 — India
- P. bhagirathai Tikader, 1966 — India
- P. bicornutus Schmidt & Krause, 1995 — Cape Verde Is.
- P. bigibbosus Caporiacco, 1941 — Ethiopia
- P. bigibbus (O. Pickard-Cambridge, 1876) — Egypt, Sudan, Arabia, India
  - P. b. australis Lawrence, 1928 — South Africa
- P. bilineatus Bryant, 1933 — USA
- P. bimuricatus Dondale & Redner, 1968 — USA
- P. blanckei (Wunderlich, 1995) — France (Corsica), Italy (Sardinia, mainland)
- P. bonneti Karol, 1968 — Turkey
- P. borana Caporiacco, 1939 — Ethiopia
- P. bosmansi Muster & Thaler, 2004 — Algeria
- P. brachycephalus Lawrence, 1952 — South Africa
- P. breviductus Dondale & Redner, 1969 — Jamaica
- P. browningi Lawrence, 1952 — South Africa
- P. bucaensis (Logunov & Kunt, 2010) — Turkey
- P. buchari Kubcová, 2004 — Europe
- P. buxi Simon, 1884 — Europe, Russia (Europe to Far East), Kazakhstan, Iran
- P. calidus Lucas, 1846 — Algeria, Morocco, Libya
- P. californicus Keyserling, 1884 — North America
- P. cammarus Rossi, 1846 — Balkans
- P. caporiaccoi Roewer, 1951 — Kenya
- P. casseli Simon, 1900 — Mali
- P. catagraphus Simon, 1870 — Spain
- P. cavatus Dondale & Redner, 1969 — Mexico
- P. cayanus Taczanowski, 1872 — French Guiana
- P. cespitum (Walckenaer, 1802) — North America, Europe, North Africa, Turkey, Caucasus, Russia (Europe to Far East), Kazakhstan, Iran, Mongolia, China, Korea, Japan
- P. chambaensis Tikader, 1980 — India, China
- P. chamisis Schick, 1965 — USA, Mexico
- P. cinereus O. Pickard-Cambridge, 1876 — Egypt
- P. coachellae Schick, 1965 — USA, Mexico
- P. collinus C. L. Koch, 1835 — Europe, Turkey, Caucasus
- P. corradii Caporiacco, 1941 — Ethiopia
- P. cubanus Dondale & Redner, 1968 — Cuba
- P. cufrae Caporiacco, 1936 — Libya
- P. daoxianen Yin, Peng & Kim, 1999 — China
- P. decoratus Tikader, 1962 — India
- P. denisi Levy, 1977 — Egypt
- P. devhutai Tikader, 1966 — India
- P. diablae Schick, 1965 — USA
- P. digitatus Yang, Zhu & Song, 2005 — China
- P. dilatatus Caporiacco, 1940 — Ethiopia
- P. dilutus Thorell, 1875 — Ukraine, Russia (Europe)
- P. dispar Walckenaer, 1826 — Europe, Turkey, Caucasus, Russia (Europe to South Siberia), Iran. Introduced to USA, Canada
- P. distans Dondale & Redner, 1968 — USA
- P. domesticus Tikader, 1962 — India
- P. droseroides Schick, 1965 — USA
- P. dubius Caporiacco, 1933 — Libya
- P. durvei Tikader, 1980 — India
- P. emarginatus (Schrank, 1803) — Europe, Caucasus, Russia (Europe to Far East), Kazakhstan, Iran, Central Asia, Mongolia, China, Korea, Japan
  - P. e. lusitanicus Kulczyński, 1911 — Portugal
- P. epigynatus Strand, 1909 — South Africa
- P. erythrops Caporiacco, 1933 — Libya
- P. exilis Banks, 1892 — USA, Canada
- P. femurostriatus Muster, 2009 — Greece, Turkey
- P. floridensis Banks, 1904 — USA
- P. foucauldi Denis, 1954 — Algeria
- P. frontosus Simon, 1897 — India
- P. fuscolimbatus Lucas, 1846 — Mediterranean
- P. fuscomarginatus (De Geer, 1778) — Europe, Russia (Europe to Far East)
- P. gertschi Schick, 1965 — USA
- P. grazianii Caporiacco, 1933 — Libya
- P. grosi Lessert, 1943 — Congo
- P. guineensis Millot, 1942 — Guinea, Ivory Coast
- P. guiyang Long & Yu, 2022 — China
- P. gyirongensis Hu, 2001 — China
- P. hadzii Šilhavý, 1944 — North Macedonia
- P. harrietae Dondale & Redner, 1969 — USA
- P. hiulcus (Pavesi, 1883) — Ethiopia, Somalia
- P. humilis Kroneberg, 1875 — Tajikistan
- P. imbecillus Keyserling, 1880 — USA, Canada
- P. immaculatus Denis, 1955 — Niger
- P. infectus Dondale & Redner, 1969 — Mexico
- P. infuscatus Keyserling, 1880 — USA, Canada
  - P. i. utus Chamberlin, 1921 — USA
- P. insperatus Schick, 1965 — USA, Canada
- P. insulanus Kulczyński, 1905 — Madeira
- P. jabalpurensis Gajbe & Gajbe, 1999 — India
- P. jimredneri Jiménez, 1989 — Mexico
- P. johani Muster, 2009 — Greece
- P. josemitensis Gertsch, 1934 — USA, Canada
- P. juvencus Kulczyński, 1895 — Armenia
- P. kalliaensis Levy, 1977 — Israel
- P. ketani Gajbe, 2005 — India
- P. keyserlingi Marx, 1890 — USA, Canada
- P. kianganensis Barrion & Litsinger, 1995 — Philippines
- P. kraepelini Simon, 1905 — Indonesia (Java)
- P. krausi Muster & Thaler, 2004 — Albania, Greece, Turkey
- P. laricium Simon, 1875 — Spain, France, Italy, Switzerland, Austria, Germany
- P. lasaensis Yin, Peng, Bao & Kim, 2000 — China
- P. laticeps Keyserling, 1880 — USA
- P. latrophagus Levy, 1999 — Israel, United Arab Emirates
- P. legae Caporiacco, 1941 — Ethiopia
- P. lhasana Hu, 2001 — China
- P. lividus Simon, 1875 — Portugal, France, Morocco, Algeria, Italy, Croatia
- P. longiductus Dondale & Redner, 1969 — Costa Rica
- P. longipalpis Simon, 1870 — Europe, Iran, Azerbaijan
- P. lugens (O. Pickard-Cambridge, 1876) — Egypt
- P. lunatus Muster & Thaler, 2004 — Croatia, Albania, Greece, Cyprus, Turkey
- P. luteovirescens Urquhart, 1893 — Australia (Tasmania)
- P. lutulentus Gertsch, 1934 — USA
- P. maculatovittatus Strand, 1906 — Ethiopia
- P. maestrii Caporiacco, 1941 — Ethiopia
- P. maghrebi Muster, 2009 — Algeria
- P. maliniae Tikader, 1966 — India
- P. manikae Tikader, 1971 — India
- P. margaritatus (Clerck, 1757) — Europe, Turkey, Caucasus, Russia (Europe to Far East), Kazakhstan, Iran, Korea, Japan
- P. marginellus Banks, 1901 — USA, Mexico
- P. marmoratus Kulczyński, 1891 — Austria, Czechia to Bulgaria, Ukraine
- P. marusiki (Logunov, 1997) — Russia (West and South Siberia), Mongolia
- P. marxi Keyserling, 1884 — USA
- P. mediocris Gertsch, 1934 — USA
- P. melanostomus Thorell, 1895 — Myanmar
- P. mexicanus Dondale & Redner, 1969 — Mexico
- P. mineri Gertsch, 1933 — USA
- P. minutus Banks, 1892 — USA, Canada
- P. mississippianus Dondale & Redner, 1969 — USA
- P. mohiniae Tikader, 1966 — India
- P. molarius L. Koch, 1879 — Kazakhstan
- P. monitae Muster & Van Keer, 2010 — Bulgaria, Greece
- P. montanus Bryant, 1933 — USA
- P. morsus Karsch, 1884 — West Africa
- P. multispinus Caporiacco, 1933 — Libya
- P. musteri Lecigne & Oger, 2020 — Turkey
- P. nigrostriatipes Bösenberg & Strand, 1906 — Japan
- P. niveus Vinson, 1863 — Madagascar
- P. oneida Levi, 1951 — USA, Canada
- P. orarius Schick, 1965 — USA, Mexico
- P. orientalis Schenkel, 1963 — China
- P. otjimbumbe Lawrence, 1927 — Namibia
- P. pali Gajbe & Gajbe, 2001 — India
- P. panganii Caporiacco, 1947 — East Africa
- P. parietalis Simon, 1875 — Spain, France
- P. partitus Lessert, 1919 — East Africa
- P. pawani Gajbe, 2005 — India
- P. pelagonus Šilhavý, 1944 — North Macedonia
- P. peninsulanus Gertsch, 1934 — USA, Canada
- P. pentheri Muster, 2009 — Albania, Azerbaijan
- P. pericu Jiménez, 1989 — Mexico
- P. pernix Blackwall, 1846 — USA, Canada
- P. pesbovis Caporiacco, 1949 — Kenya
- P. pinetorum Muster, 2009 — Portugal to Turkey
- P. pinyonelis Schick, 1965 — USA
- P. placidus Banks, 1892 — North America
- P. planus (L. Koch, 1875) — New Guinea, Australia (Queensland)
- P. poecilus (Thorell, 1872) — Europe, Turkey, Caucasus, Russia (Europe to Far East), Central Asia
- P. populicola Denis, 1958 — Afghanistan
- P. praedatus O. Pickard-Cambridge, 1871 — Europe, Russia (Europe to South Siberia), Azerbaijan, Iran
- P. praelustris Keyserling, 1880 — USA, Canada
- P. pratariae (Scheffer, 1904) — USA, Mexico
- P. pratarioides Dondale & Redner, 1969 — Mexico
- P. probolus Dondale & Redner, 1969 — USA
- P. psaronius Dondale & Redner, 1968 — Mexico
- P. pseudanomalus Dondale & Redner, 1969 — Mexico
- P. pseudoexilis Paik, 1979 — Korea
- P. punctatissimus Roewer, 1962 — Afghanistan
- P. punctisternus Caporiacco, 1940 — Ethiopia
- P. pygmaeus Levy, 1977 — Israel
- P. quercicola Schick, 1965 — USA
- P. rajani Gajbe, 2005 — India
- P. renarius Urita & Song, 1987 — China
- P. rodecki Gertsch & Jellison, 1939 — USA, Canada
- P. roseus Kishida, 1914 — Japan
- P. rufus Walckenaer, 1826 — North America, Europe, Turkey, Caucasus, Russia (Europe to Far East), Kazakhstan, Iran, Central Asia, Mongolia, China, Korea, Japan
  - P. r. jenningsi Cutler, 2003 — USA
  - P. r. pacificus Banks, 1898 — USA, Canada
  - P. r. quartus Dondale & Redner, 1968 — North America
  - P. r. vibrans Dondale, 1964 — USA, Canada
- P. sanjeevi Gajbe, 2004 — India
- P. satullus Keyserling, 1880 — USA to Costa Rica
- P. schicki Dondale & Redner, 1968 — USA
- P. separatus Dondale & Redner, 1969 — Mexico
- P. shaochui Yin, Peng, Bao & Kim, 2000 — China
- P. shillongensis Tikader, 1962 — India
- P. silvestrii Caporiacco, 1940 — Somalia
- P. simillimus Denis, 1962 — Madeira
- P. speciosus Gertsch, 1934 — USA, Canada
- P. spectabilis Keyserling, 1880 — USA, Canada
- P. spinitarsis Simon, 1895 — Russia (South Siberia, Far East), China, Korea, Japan
- P. splendens Indzhov, 2020 — Bulgaria
- P. sticticus Lucas, 1858 — Gabon
- P. subaureolus Bösenberg & Strand, 1906 — Mongolia, China, Korea, Japan
- P. tabupumensis Petrunkevitch, 1914 — Myanmar
- P. thanatellus Strand, 1909 — South Africa
- P. tiwarii Basu, 1973 — India
- P. tortus Dondale & Redner, 1969 — USA
- P. traviatus Banks, 1929 — Panama, Aruba, Curaçao, Venezuela
- P. undarum Barnes, 1953 — USA
- P. utotchkini Marusik, 1991 — Russia (South Siberia, Far East)
- P. v-notatus Caporiacco, 1947 — Ethiopia
- P. vagulus Simon, 1875 — Europe
- P. validus (Gertsch, 1933) — USA
- P. venustus O. Pickard-Cambridge, 1876 — Egypt
- P. verityi Schick, 1965 — USA
- P. victor Lessert, 1943 — Congo
- P. vinokurovi Marusik, 1991 — Russia (Urals to South Siberia), China
- P. vulgaris (Hentz, 1847) — USA, Canada
- P. vulpio Simon, 1910 — South Africa

=== Procleocnemis ===
Procleocnemis Mello-Leitão, 1929

- P. concolor Mello-Leitão, 1929 (type) — Brazil

=== Psellonus ===
Psellonus Simon, 1897

- P. planus Simon, 1897 (type) — India

=== Pseudopsellonus ===
Pseudopsellonus Balogh, 1936

- P. papuanus Balogh, 1936 (type) — New Guinea

=== Pulchellodromus ===
Pulchellodromus Wunderlich, 2012

- P. afroglaucinus (Muster & Bosmans, 2007) — Algeria
- P. bistigma (Simon, 1870) — Mediterranean
- P. glaucinus (Simon, 1870) — Mediterranean
- P. lamellipalpis (Muster, 2007) — Algeria
- P. mainlingensis (Hu & Li, 1987) — Tibet
- P. medius (O. Pickard-Cambridge, 1872) — Italy, Greece, Turkey, Ukraine, Caucasus (Russia, Azerbaijan), Iran
- P. navarrus Kastrygina, Kovblyuk & Polchaninova, 2016 — Spain
- P. pardalis (Muster & Bosmans, 2007) — Portugal, Spain, Algeria to Egypt
- P. pulchellus (Lucas, 1846) (type) — Mediterranean
- P. punctiger (O. Pickard-Cambridge, 1908) — Canary Is., Spain
- P. ruficapillus (Simon, 1885) — Mediterranean to Kazakhstan
- P. simoni (Mello-Leitão, 1929) — Portugal, Spain, Algeria
- P. wunderlichi (Muster & Thaler, 2007) — Canary Is.

== R ==
=== Rhysodromus ===
Rhysodromus Schick, 1965

- R. ablegminus (Szita & Logunov, 2008) — Kazakhstan
- R. alascensis (Keyserling, 1884) — North America, Russia (Urals to Far East), Kazakhstan, China
- R. angulobulbis (Szita & Logunov, 2008) — Russia (South Siberia)
- R. caspius (Ponomarev, 2008) — Kazakhstan
- R. cinerascens (O. Pickard-Cambridge, 1885) — China (Yarkand)
- R. fallax (Sundevall, 1833) — Europe, North Africa, Turkey, Caucasus, Russia (Europe to Far East), Kazakhstan, Iran, Central Asia, Mongolia, China
- R. halophilus (Levy, 1977) — Israel
- R. hierosolymitanus (Levy, 1977) — Israel, United Arab Emirates, Iran
- R. hierroensis (Wunderlich, 1992) — Canary Is.
- R. histrio (Latreille, 1819) (type) — North America, Europe, Turkey, Caucasus, Russia (Europe to Far East), Central Asia, China
- R. hui (Yang & Mao, 2002) — China
- R. lanchowensis (Schenkel, 1936) — Russia (West Siberia to Far East), China, Korea, Japan
- R. lepidus (Blackwall, 1870) — Mediterranean to India
- R. leucomarginatus (Paik, 1979) — China, Korea
- R. mysticus (Dondale & Redner, 1975) — Russia (Middle Siberia to Far East), USA, Canada
- R. naxcivanicus (Logunov & Huseynov, 2008) — Azerbaijan
- R. petrobius (Schmidt & Krause, 1995) — Cape Verde Is.
- R. pictus (Kroneberg, 1875) — Central Asia to China
- R. rikhteri (Logunov & Huseynov, 2008) — Armenia, Azerbaijan
- R. signatus (O. Pickard-Cambridge, 1870) — St. Helena
- R. sinaiticus (Levy, 1977) — Egypt
- R. timidus (Szita & Logunov, 2008) — Russia (Caucasus), Kazakhstan, Pakistan
- R. triangulatus (Urita & Song, 1987) — Kazakhstan to China
- R. tuvinensis (Szita & Logunov, 2008) — Russia (West and South Siberia), Kazakhstan, Mongolia
- R. xerophilus (Szita & Logunov, 2008) — Russia (Central Asia, South Siberia), Kazakhstan
- R. xinjiangensis (Tang & Song, 1987) — Azerbaijan, Kazakhstan, Central Asia, China

== S ==
=== Suemus ===
Suemus Simon, 1895

- S. atomarius Simon, 1895 (type) — Sierra Leone
- S. orientalis Simon, 1909 — Vietnam
- S. punctatus Lawrence, 1938 — South Africa
- S. tibelliformis Simon, 1909 — Vietnam
- S. tibelloides Caporiacco, 1947 — East Africa

== T ==
=== Thanatus ===
Thanatus

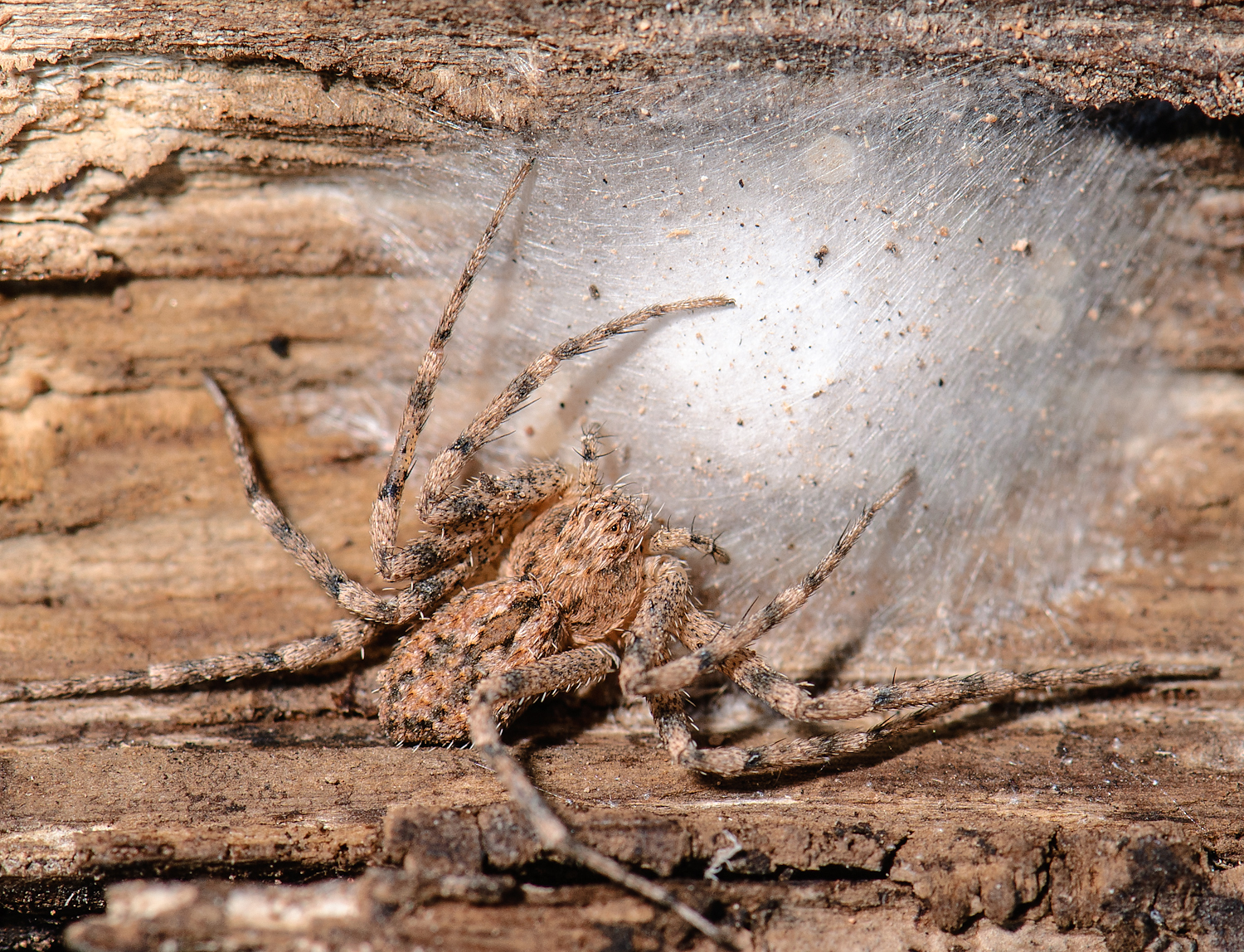
Thanatus coloradensis, female

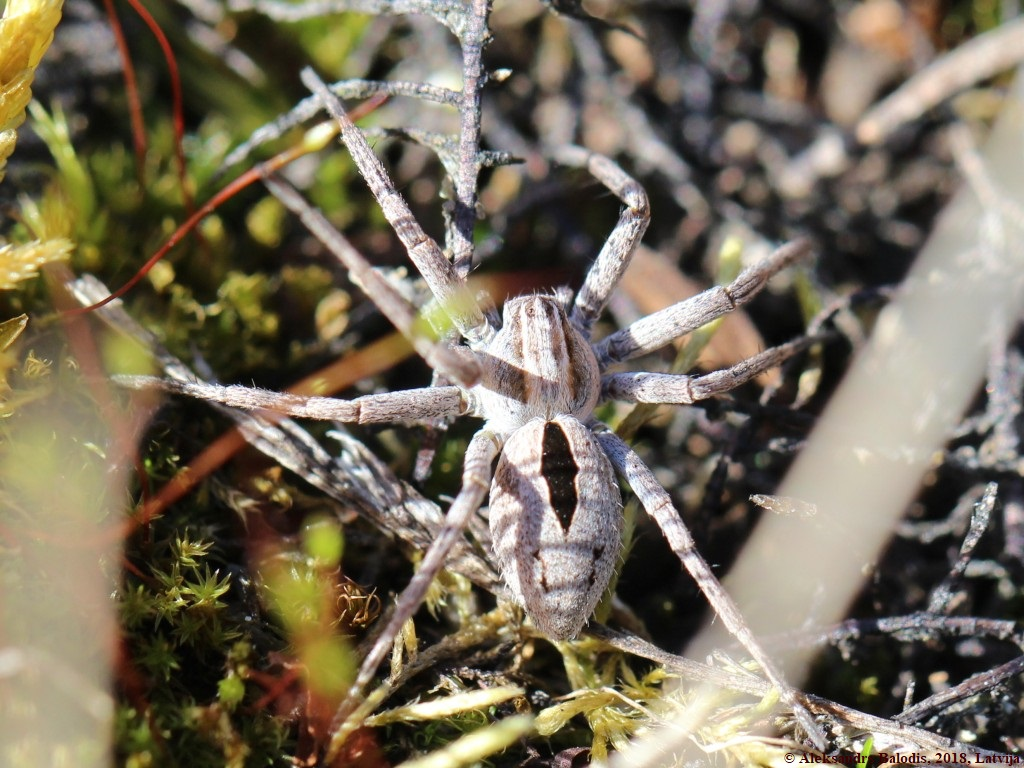
Thanatus formicinus

Thanatus C. L. Koch, 1837

- T. africanus Karsch, 1878 — Tanzania (Zanzibar), South Africa
- T. albescens O. Pickard-Cambridge, 1885 — China (Yarkand)
- T. altimontis Gertsch, 1933 — USA, Mexico
- T. arcticus Thorell, 1872 — USA (Alaska), Canada, Greenland, Northern Europe, Russia (Europe to Far East), Kazakhstan, China, Japan
- T. arenarius L. Koch, 1872 — Europe to Iran
- T. arenicola (Schmidt, 1976) — Canary Is.
- T. aridorum Šilhavý, 1940 — Czechia
- T. atlanticus Berland, 1936 — Cape Verde Is.
- T. atratus Simon, 1875 — Europe, Turkey, Caucasus, Russia (Europe to South Siberia), Kazakhstan, Iran, Korea, Japan
- T. balestrerii Caporiacco, 1935 — Karakorum
- T. bungei (Kulczyński, 1908) — Russia (Urals to Far East), Japan, North America
- T. chorillensis Keyserling, 1880 — Peru
- T. coloradensis Keyserling, 1880 — North America, Europe, Russia (Caucasus to Far East), Kazakhstan, China
- T. coreanus Paik, 1979 — Russia (South Siberia, Far East), Korea, China
- T. cronebergi Simon, 1895 — Mongolia
- T. dahurianus Logunov, 1997 — Russia (South Siberia)
- T. damingus Wang, Zhang & Xing, 2013 — China
- T. denisi Brignoli, 1983 — Afghanistan
- T. dhakuricus Tikader, 1960 — India
- T. dissimilis Denis, 1960 — France
- T. dorsilineatus Jézéquel, 1964 — Ivory Coast
- T. fabricii (Audouin, 1826) — Canary Is., Northern Africa, Portugal, Spain, Greece (Crete), Turkey, Caucasus, Middle East, Iran, Kazakhstan, Central Asia
- T. firmetorum Muster & Thaler, 2003 — Switzerland, Germany, Austria, Italy
- T. flavescens O. Pickard-Cambridge, 1876 — Egypt
- T. flavidus Simon, 1875 — Greece, Ukraine, Russia (Europe)
- T. flavus O. Pickard-Cambridge, 1876 — Egypt
- T. forbesi Pocock, 1903 — Yemen (Socotra)
- T. forciformis Li, Feng & Yang, 2013 — China
- T. formicinus (Clerck, 1757) (type) — North America, Europe, North Africa, Turkey, Caucasus, Russia (Europe to Far East), Iran, Kazakhstan, Central Asia, China, Japan
- T. fornicatus Simon, 1897 — Egypt (Sinai) to Pakistan
- T. frederici Denis, 1941 — Cape Verde Is.
- T. fuscipes Denis, 1937 — Algeria
  - T. f. concolor Denis, 1957 — Spain
- T. gnaquiensis Strand, 1908 — Peru
- T. granadensis Keyserling, 1880 — Colombia
- T. hongkong Song, Zhu & Wu, 1997 — China
- T. imbecillus L. Koch, 1878 — Greece, North Macedonia, Bulgaria, Ukraine, Caucasus, Russia (Europe, Urals), Iran, Central Asia
- T. inconsuetus Caporiacco, 1940 — Ethiopia
- T. indicus Simon, 1885 — India
- T. jabalpurensis Gajbe & Gajbe, 1999 — India
- T. jaikensis Ponomarev, 2007 — Kazakhstan
- T. ketani Bhandari & Gajbe, 2001 — India
- T. kitabensis Charitonov, 1946 — Azerbaijan, Russia (West Siberia), Iran, Kazakhstan, Central Asia
- T. lamottei Jézéquel, 1964 — Ivory Coast
- T. lanatus Logunov, 1996 — Russia (Far East)
- T. lanceolatus Simon, 1875 — Ukraine
- T. lanceoletus Tikader, 1966 — India
- T. lesserti (Roewer, 1951) — Turkey, Egypt to Iran
- T. lineatipes Simon, 1870 — Mediterranean, Georgia
- T. luederitzi Simon, 1910 — Namibia
- T. maculatus Keyserling, 1880 — Peru
- T. mandali Tikader, 1965 — India
- T. meronensis Levy, 1977 — Israel
- T. mikhailovi Logunov, 1996 — Russia (Europe to South Siberia), Kazakhstan, Central Asia
- T. miniaceus Simon, 1880 — Mongolia, China, Taiwan, Korea, Japan
- T. mongolicus (Schenkel, 1936) — Ukraine, Russia (Europe), Kazakhstan, Mongolia, China
- T. mus Strand, 1908 — Peru
- T. namaquensis Simon, 1910 — South Africa
- T. neimongol Urita & Song, 1987 — China
- T. nentwigi Wunderlich, 2017 — Nigeria
- T. nigromaculatus Kulczyński, 1885 — Russia (Kamchatka)
- T. nipponicus Yaginuma, 1969 — Russia (Far East), Mongolia, China, Korea, Japan
- T. nodongensis Kim & Kim, 2012 — Korea
- T. oblongiusculus (Lucas, 1846) — Southern Europe, Turkey, North Africa, Ukraine, Russia (Europe) to Central Asia, Iran, China
  - T. o. atomarius (Simon, 1932) — France
- T. okayi Karol, 1966 — Turkey
- T. ornatus (Lucas, 1846) — Algeria
- T. pagenstecheri Strand, 1906 — Namibia
- T. parangvulgaris Barrion & Litsinger, 1995 — Thailand
- T. philodromicus Strand, 1916 — Madagascar
- T. philodromoides Caporiacco, 1940 — Somalia
- T. pictus L. Koch, 1881 — Europe, Turkey, Caucasus, Russia (Europe to West Siberia), Kazakhstan, Iran
- T. pinnatus Jézéquel, 1964 — Ivory Coast
- T. plumosus Simon, 1890 — Yemen
- T. pollex Li, Feng & Yang, 2013 — China
- T. prolixus Simon, 1897 — India
- T. pygmaeus Schmidt & Krause, 1996 — Canary Is.
- T. rayi Simon, 1875 — Europe to Kazakhstan
- T. roseofemoralis (Karsch, 1879) — Japan
- T. rubicellus Mello-Leitão, 1929 — USA, Canada
- T. rubicundus L. Koch, 1875 — Ethiopia, Somalia, East Africa
- T. sabulosus (Menge, 1875) — Europe, Turkey, Caucasus, Russia (Europe to Far East), Kazakhstan
- T. saraevi Ponomarev, 2007 — Kazakhstan, Iran, Pakistan, Uzbekistan
- T. schubotzi Strand, 1913 — Central Africa
- T. sepiacolor Levy, 1999 — Israel, United Arab Emirates
- T. setiger (O. Pickard-Cambridge, 1872) — Israel, United Arab Emirates, Iran
- T. sibiricus Kulczyński, 1901 — Russia (South Siberia)
- T. simplicipalpis Simon, 1882 — Yemen, India
- T. stepposus Logunov, 1996 — Russia (South Siberia), China
- T. striatus C. L. Koch, 1845 — North America, Europe, Turkey, Russia (Europe to Far East), Kazakhstan, Iran, Central Asia
- T. stripatus Tikader, 1980 — India
- T. tuvinensis Logunov, 1996 — Russia (South to north-eastern Siberia), Kyrgyzstan
- T. ubsunurensis Logunov, 1996 — Russia (South Siberia)
- T. validus Simon, 1875 — Algeria
- T. vulgaris Simon, 1870 — North America, Europe, North Africa, Turkey, Israel, Caucasus, Russia (Europe to Far East), Iran, Kazakhstan, Central Asia, China, Korea
  - T. v. creticus Kulczyński, 1903 — Greece (Crete)
- T. wuchuanensis Tang & Wang, 2008 — China
- T. xinjiangensis Hu & Wu, 1989 — China
- T. zavattarii Caporiacco, 1939 — Ethiopia

=== Tibellus ===
Tibellus

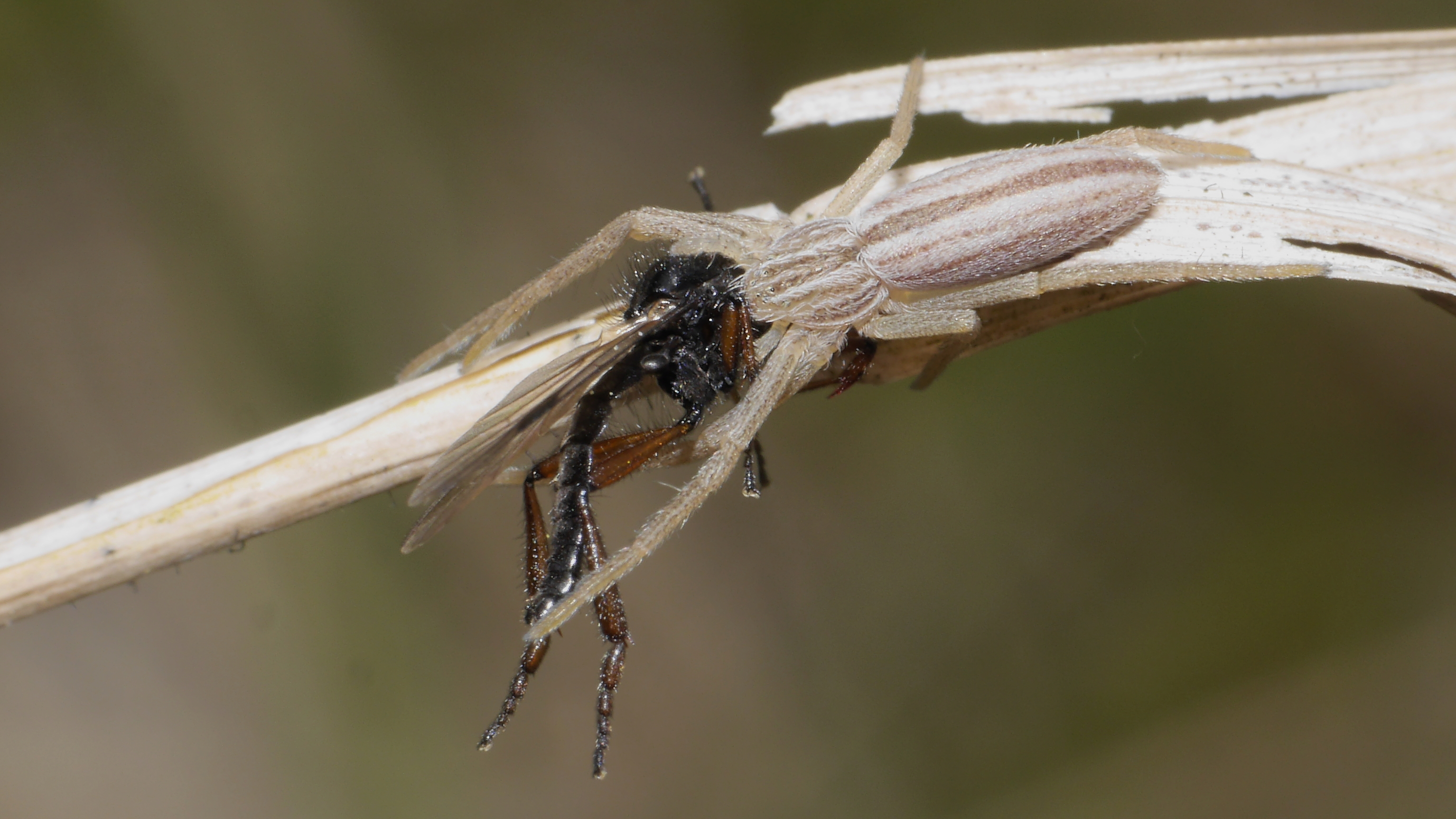
Tibellus oblongus

Tibellus Simon, 1875

- T. affinis O. Pickard-Cambridge, 1898 — Mexico
- T. armatus Lessert, 1928 — Central, Southern Africa
- T. asiaticus Kulczyński, 1908 — Russia (Middle Siberia to Far East), North America
- T. aspersus Danilov, 1991 — Russia (South Siberia, Far East)
- T. australis (Simon, 1910) — Botswana
- T. bruneitarsis Lawrence, 1952 — Zimbabwe, South Africa
- T. bagerhatensis Biswas, 2026 — Bangladesh
- T. californicus Schick, 1965 — USA
- T. chamberlini Gertsch, 1933 — USA, Canada
- T. chaturshingi Tikader, 1962 — India
- T. chilensis Mello-Leitão, 1943 — Chile
- T. cobusi Van den Berg & Dippenaar-Schoeman, 1994 — East, Southern Africa
- T. cucurbitus Yang, Zhu & Song, 2005 — China
- T. demangei Jézéquel, 1964 — Ivory Coast, South Africa
- T. duttoni (Hentz, 1847) — USA, Mexico
- T. elongatus Tikader, 1960 — India
- T. fengi Efimik, 1999 — Russia (Far East), China, Japan
- T. flavipes Caporiacco, 1939 — East, Southern Africa
- T. gerhardi Van den Berg & Dippenaar-Schoeman, 1994 — East, Southern Africa
- T. hollidayi Lawrence, 1952 — East, Southern Africa
- T. insularis Gertsch, 1933 — Cuba
- T. jabalpurensis Gajbe & Gajbe, 1999 — India
- T. japonicus Efimik, 1999 — Russia (Far East), China, Japan
- T. katrajghatus Tikader, 1962 — India
- T. kibonotensis Lessert, 1919 — East, Southern Africa
- T. kimi Kim & Seong, 2015 — Korea
- T. macellus Simon, 1875 — Europe, Turkey, Caucasus, Russia (Europe to Far East), Kazakhstan
  - T. m. georgicus Mcheidze, 1997 — Georgia
- T. maritimus (Menge, 1875) — North America, Europe, Caucasus, Russia (Europe to Far East), Central Asia, China
- T. minor Lessert, 1919 — Africa
- T. nigeriensis Millot, 1942 — Mali
- T. nimbaensis Van den Berg & Dippenaar-Schoeman, 1994 — Guinea
- T. oblongus (Walckenaer, 1802) (type) — North America, Europe, North Africa, Turkey, Israel, Caucasus, Russia (Europe to Far East), Kazakhstan, Iran, Central Asia, Mongolia, China, Korea, Japan
  - T. o. maculatus Caporiacco, 1950 — Italy
- T. orientis Efimik, 1999 — Russia (South Siberia, Far East), China
- T. paraguensis Simon, 1897 — Paraguay, Bolivia, Argentina
- T. pashanensis Tikader, 1980 — India
- T. pateli Tikader, 1980 — India
- T. poonaensis Tikader, 1962 — India
- T. propositus Roewer, 1951 — China (Yarkand)
- T. rothi Schick, 1965 — USA
- T. septempunctatus Millot, 1942 — Guinea
- T. seriepunctatus Simon, 1907 — Africa
- T. shikerpurensis Biswas & Raychaudhuri, 2003 — Bangladesh
- T. somaliensis Van den Berg & Dippenaar-Schoeman, 1994 — Somalia, Zimbabwe
- T. spinosus Schiapelli & Gerschman, 1941 — Argentina
- T. sunetae Van den Berg & Dippenaar-Schoeman, 1994 — Southern Africa
- T. tenellus (L. Koch, 1876) — Australia
- T. utotchkini Ponomarev, 2008 — France, Romania, Moldova, Russia (Europe, Caucasus)
- T. vitilis Simon, 1906 — India, Sri Lanka
- T. vossioni Simon, 1884 — Saudi Arabia, Africa
- T. zhui Tang & Song, 1989 — China

=== Tibitanus ===
Tibitanus Simon, 1907

- T. nomas Simon, 1910 — Namibia
- T. sexlineatus Simon, 1907 (type) — Guinea-Bissau, Guinea

=== Titanebo ===
Titanebo

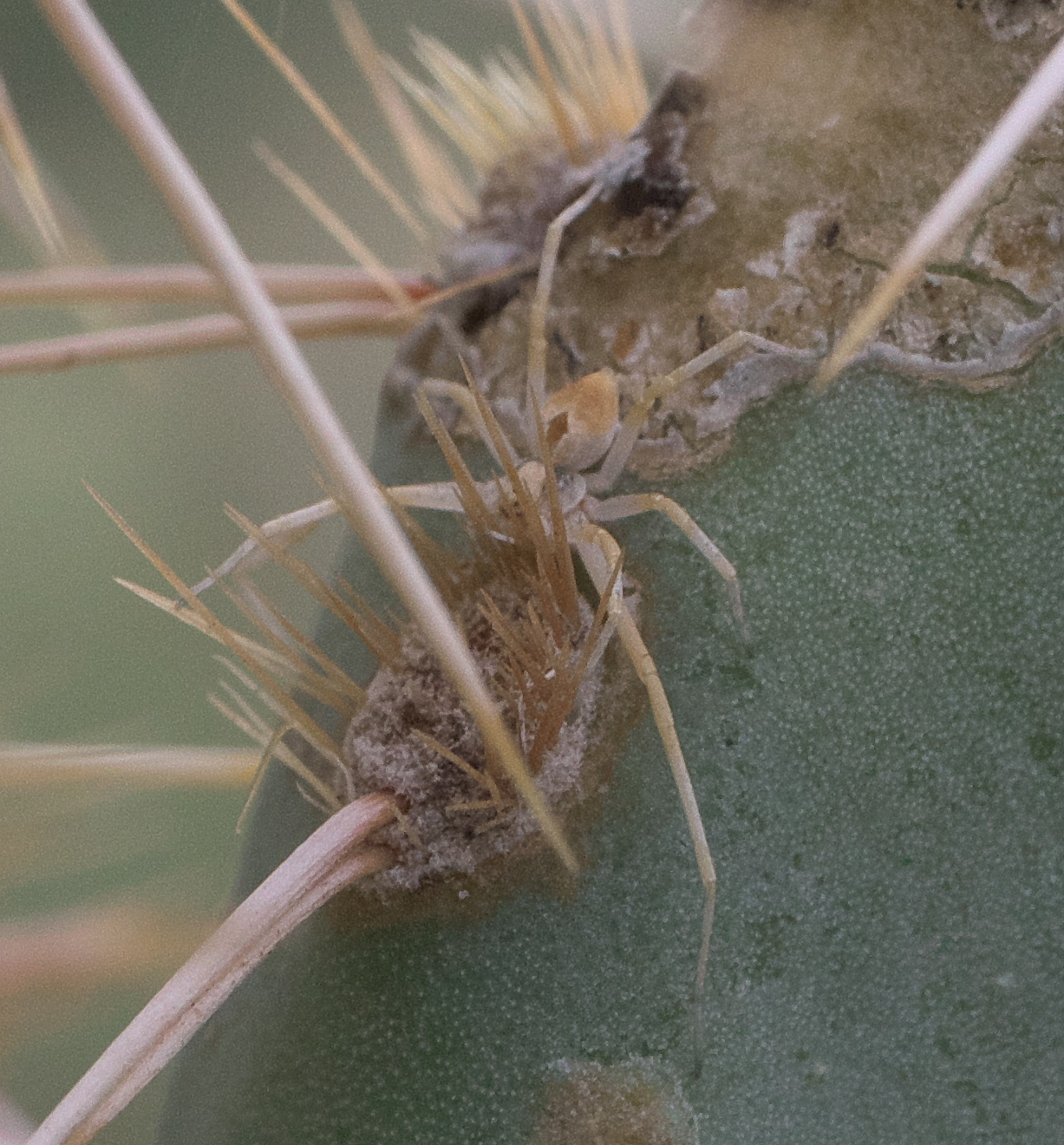
Titanebo sp.

Titanebo Gertsch, 1933

- T. albocaudatus (Schick, 1965) — USA, Mexico
- T. andreaannae (Schick, 1965) — USA
- T. californicus Gertsch, 1933 — USA
- T. cantralli (Sauer & Platnick, 1972) — USA
- T. creosotis (Schick, 1965) — USA
- T. dispar (Schick, 1965) — USA
- T. dondalei (Sauer, 1968) — USA, Mexico
- T. macyi Gertsch, 1933 (type) — USA
- T. magnificus Chamberlin & Ivie, 1942 — USA
- T. mexicanus (Banks, 1898) — USA, Mexico
- T. oblongus (Simon, 1895) — USA
- T. parabolis (Schick, 1965) — USA
- T. redneri (Cokendolpher, 1978) — USA
- T. texanus Gertsch, 1933 — USA

== V ==
=== Vacchellia ===
Vacchellia Caporiacco, 1935

- V. baltoroi Caporiacco, 1935 (type) — Karakorum
