= Tibellus bagerhatensis =

Scientific classification
- Kingdom: Animalia
- Phylum: Arthropoda
- Subphylum: Chelicerata
- Class: Arachnida
- Order: Araneae
- Infraorder: Araneomorphae
- Family: Philodromidae
- Genus: Tibellus
- Species: T. bagerhatensis

Binomial name
- Tibellus bagerhatensis Biswas, 2026

Species of spider

Tibellus bagerhatensis is a species of spider in the family Philodromidae. It is named for the Bagerhat District where it was first discovered. The species is thought to be endemic to Bagerhat District.

== Description ==
The species was described from a male holotype and a female allotype collected on 12th May, 2012 in a deep garden of the village Betaga in Bagerhat District. The male holotype was measured to be 3.90mm while the female allotype was measured to be 4.20mm.

== See also ==
- List of Philodromidae species
