= Tibellus shikerpurensis =

Scientific classification
- Kingdom: Animalia
- Phylum: Arthropoda
- Subphylum: Chelicerata
- Class: Arachnida
- Order: Araneae
- Infraorder: Araneomorphae
- Family: Philodromidae
- Genus: Tibellus
- Species: T. shikerpurensis

Binomial name
- Tibellus shikerpurensis Biswas & Raychaudhuri, 2003

Species of spider

Tibellus shikerpurensis is a species of spider in the family Philodromidae. It is native to Bangladesh.

== See also ==
- List of Philodromidae species
