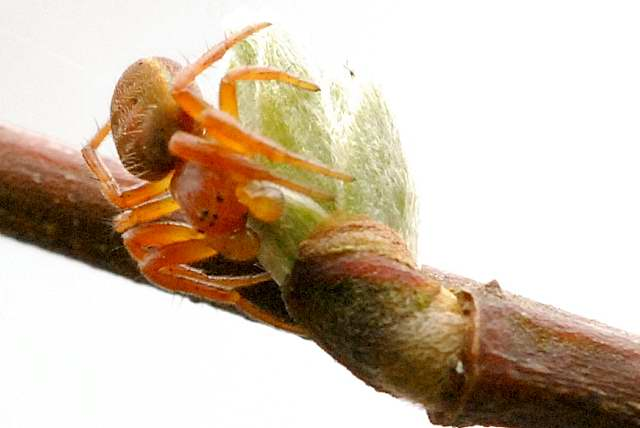

Scientific classification
- Kingdom: Animalia
- Phylum: Arthropoda
- Subphylum: Chelicerata
- Class: Arachnida
- Order: Araneae
- Infraorder: Araneomorphae
- Family: Philodromidae
- Genus: Philodromus
- Species: P. rufus

Binomial name
- Philodromus rufus Walckenaer, 1826

= Philodromus rufus =

Species of spider

Philodromus rufus, also known as the white-striped running crab spider, is a species of running crab spider in the family Philodromidae. It is found in North America, Europe, Turkey, Caucasus, Russia (Siberia), Central Asia, China, Korea, and Japan.

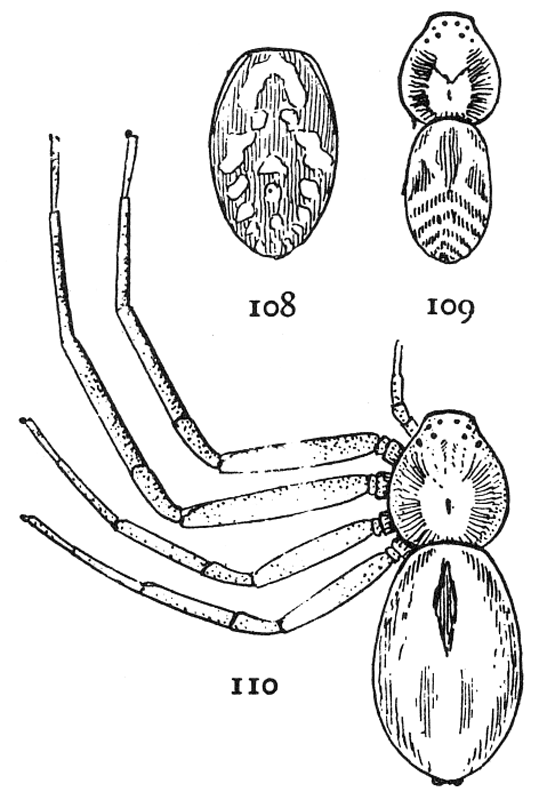

== Subspecies ==
These five subspecies belong to the species Philodromus rufus:

- (Philodromus rufus rufus) Walckenaer, 1826
- Philodromus rufus jenningsi Cutler, 2003
- Philodromus rufus pacificus Banks, 1898
- Philodromus rufus quartus Dondale & Redner, 1968
- Philodromus rufus vibrans Dondale, 1964
