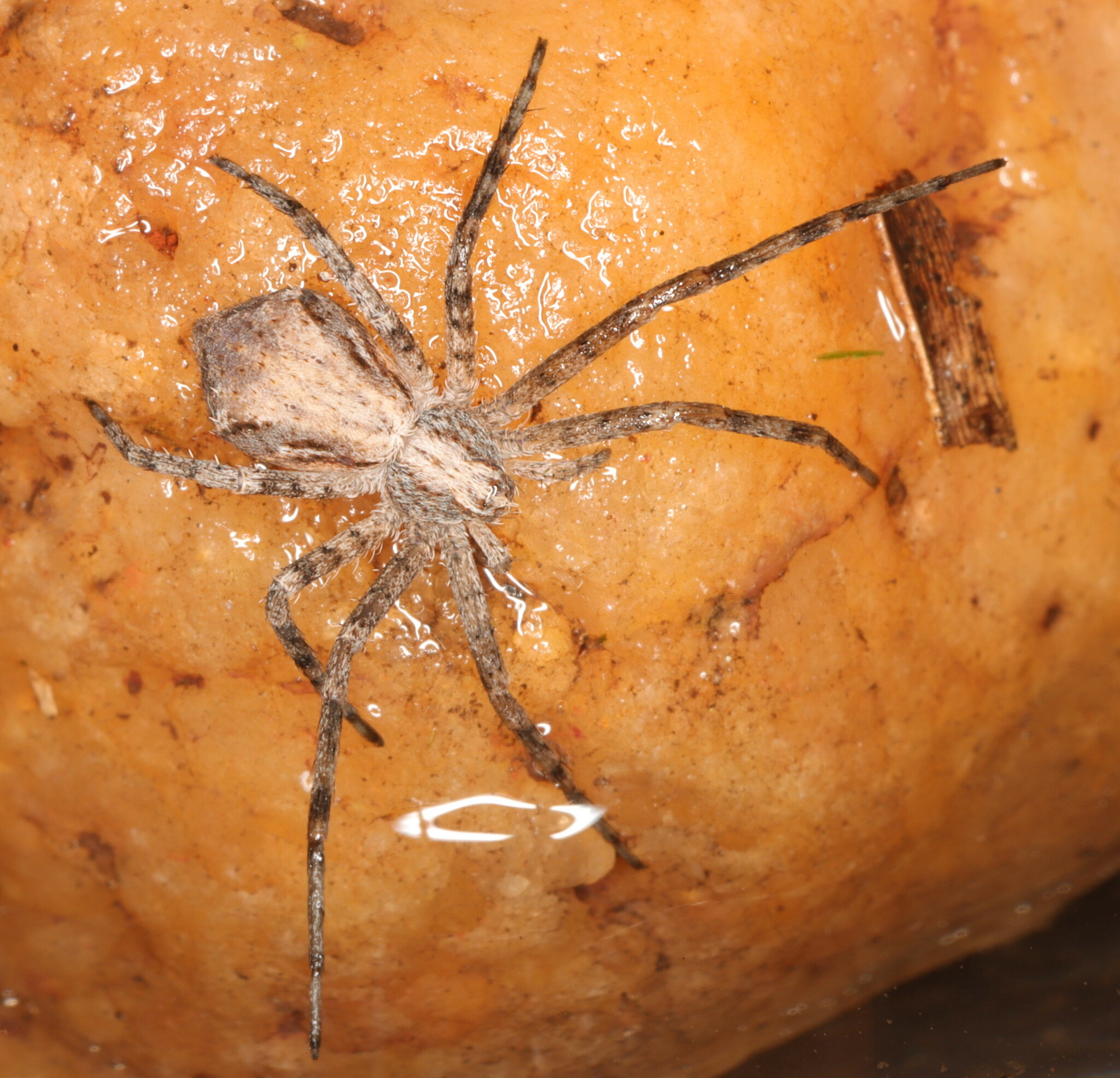
- female

Scientific classification
- Kingdom: Animalia
- Phylum: Arthropoda
- Subphylum: Chelicerata
- Class: Arachnida
- Order: Araneae
- Infraorder: Araneomorphae
- Family: Philodromidae
- Genus: Philodromus
- Species: P. bigibba

Binomial name
- Philodromus bigibba (O. Pickard-Cambridge, 1876)

= Philodromus bigibba =

Shouldered Running Spider

Species of spider

Philodromus bigibba is a species of philodromid crab spider in the family Philodromidae. It is commonly known as the shouldered running spider.

== Distribution ==
Philodromus bigibba is a species of the spider family Philodromidae with a very wide distribution recorded from Algeria, Libya, Egypt, Sudan, Yemen, Pakistan, and India.

The subspecies Philodromus bigibba australis is endemic to South Africa, where it is recorded from five provinces including six protected areas, with an altitudinal range of 206-1649 m above sea level.

== Habitat and ecology ==
These are free-living plant dwellers sampled from vegetation. It has been sampled from the Grassland, Savanna and Thicket biomes.

== Conservation ==
The subspecies Philodromus bigibba australis is listed as Least Concern by the South African National Biodiversity Institute due to its wide range. The subspecies is protected in six areas including Blouberg Nature Reserve, Nylsvley Nature Reserve, Marakele National Park and Tswalu Game Reserve.

== Taxonomy ==
The species has not been revised and the subspecies is known only from the female.
