= Philodromus emarginatus =

Scientific classification
- Kingdom: Animalia
- Phylum: Arthropoda
- Subphylum: Chelicerata
- Class: Arachnida
- Order: Araneae
- Infraorder: Araneomorphae
- Family: Philodromidae
- Genus: Philodromus
- Species: P. emarginatus

Binomial name
- Philodromus emarginatus (Schrank, 1803)

Subspecies
- Philodromus emarginatus lusitanicus Kulczynski, 1911 — Portugal

Synonyms
- Aranea emarginata Schrank, 1803; Philodromus flavidus S. Saito, 1934

Species of spider

Philodromus emarginatus is a spider species with Palearctic distribution.
