= Eminella =

Scientific classification
- Kingdom: Animalia
- Phylum: Arthropoda
- Subphylum: Chelicerata
- Class: Arachnida
- Order: Araneae
- Infraorder: Araneomorphae
- Family: Philodromidae
- Genus: Eminella; Özdikmen, 2007
- Species: E. ctenops

Binomial name
- Eminella ctenops (Mello-Leitão, 1940)

Genus of spiders

Eminella is a monotypic genus of Argentinian running crab spiders (family Philodromidae) containing the single species, Eminella ctenops. It was first described by H. Özdikmen in 2007.

== Distribution ==
This genus is endemic to Argentina.
