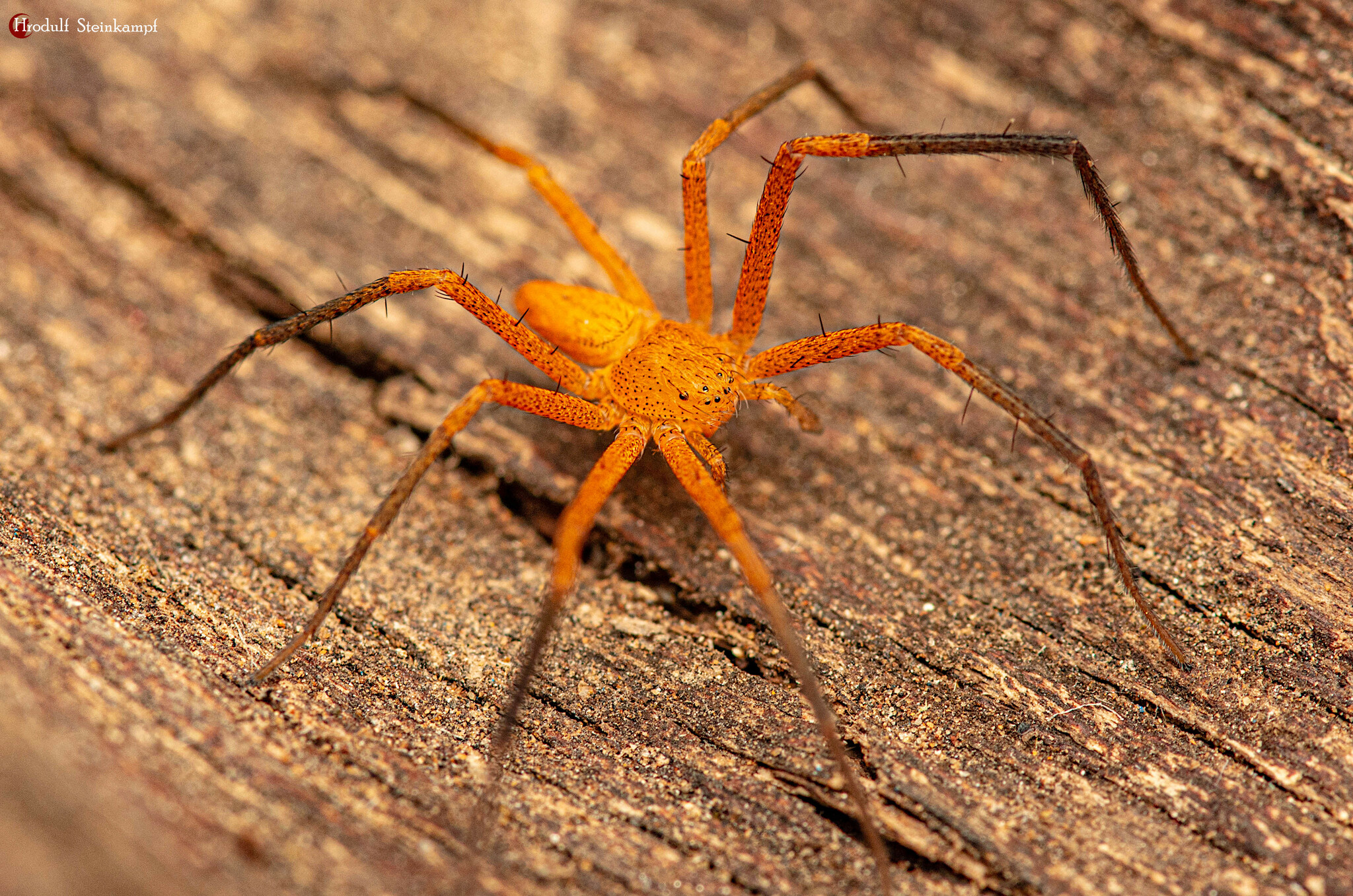
- male
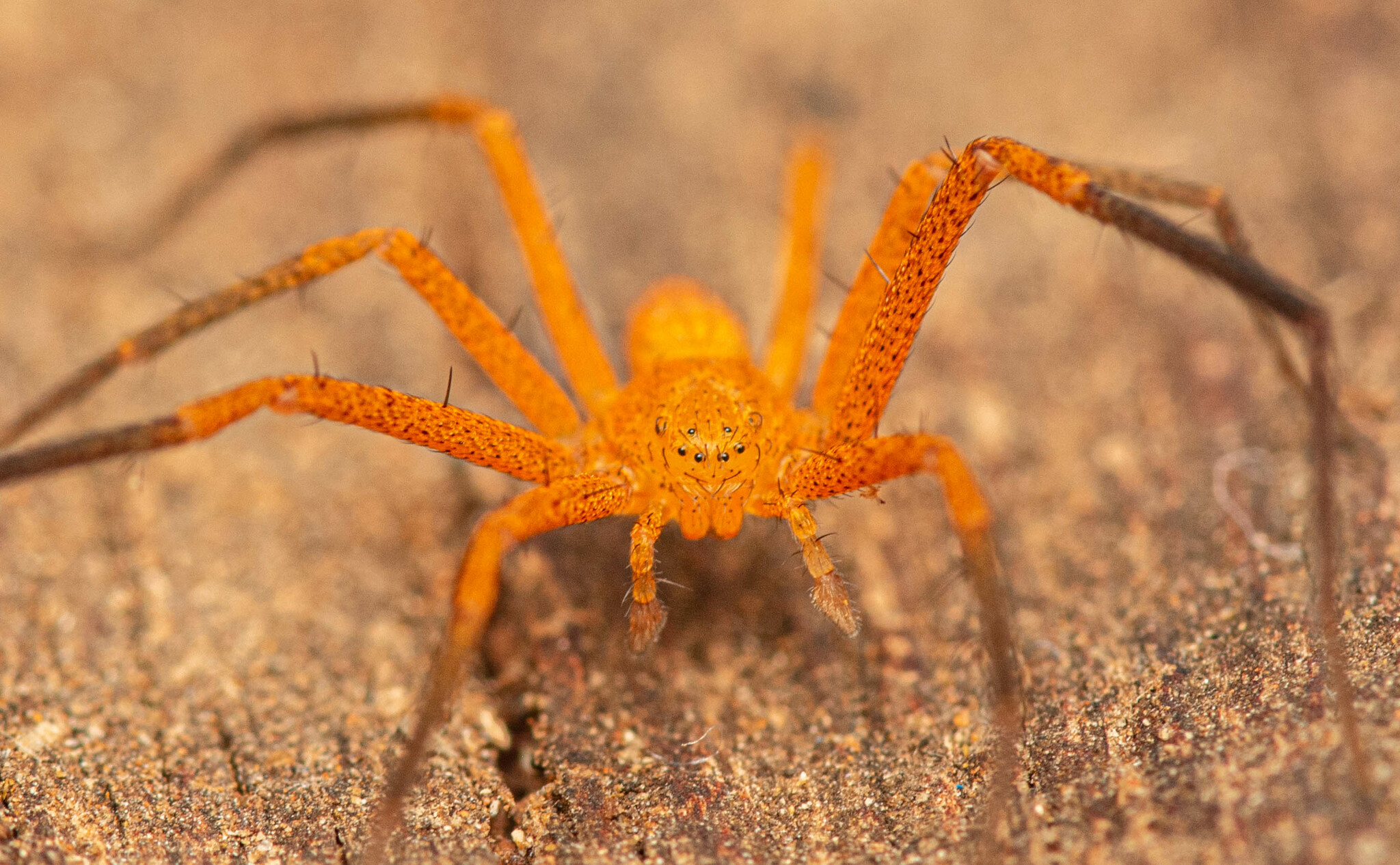
- male

Scientific classification
- Kingdom: Animalia
- Phylum: Arthropoda
- Subphylum: Chelicerata
- Class: Arachnida
- Order: Araneae
- Infraorder: Araneomorphae
- Family: Philodromidae
- Genus: Suemus
- Species: S. punctatus

Binomial name
- Suemus punctatus Lawrence, 1938

= Suemus punctatus =

Spotted Running Spider

Species of spider

Suemus punctatus is a species of spider in the family Philodromidae. It is commonly known as the spotted running spider.

== Distribution ==
Suemus punctatus is known from Mozambique, Eswatini, and South Africa. In South Africa, it has been recorded from six provinces, with an altitudinal range of 0-1438 m above sea level.

== Habitat and ecology ==
These are free-living plant dwellers sampled with sweep nets from vegetation. They have been sampled from the Fynbos, Grassland, Indian Ocean Coastal Belt, Forest, Nama Karoo, Savanna and Thicket biomes.

== Description ==
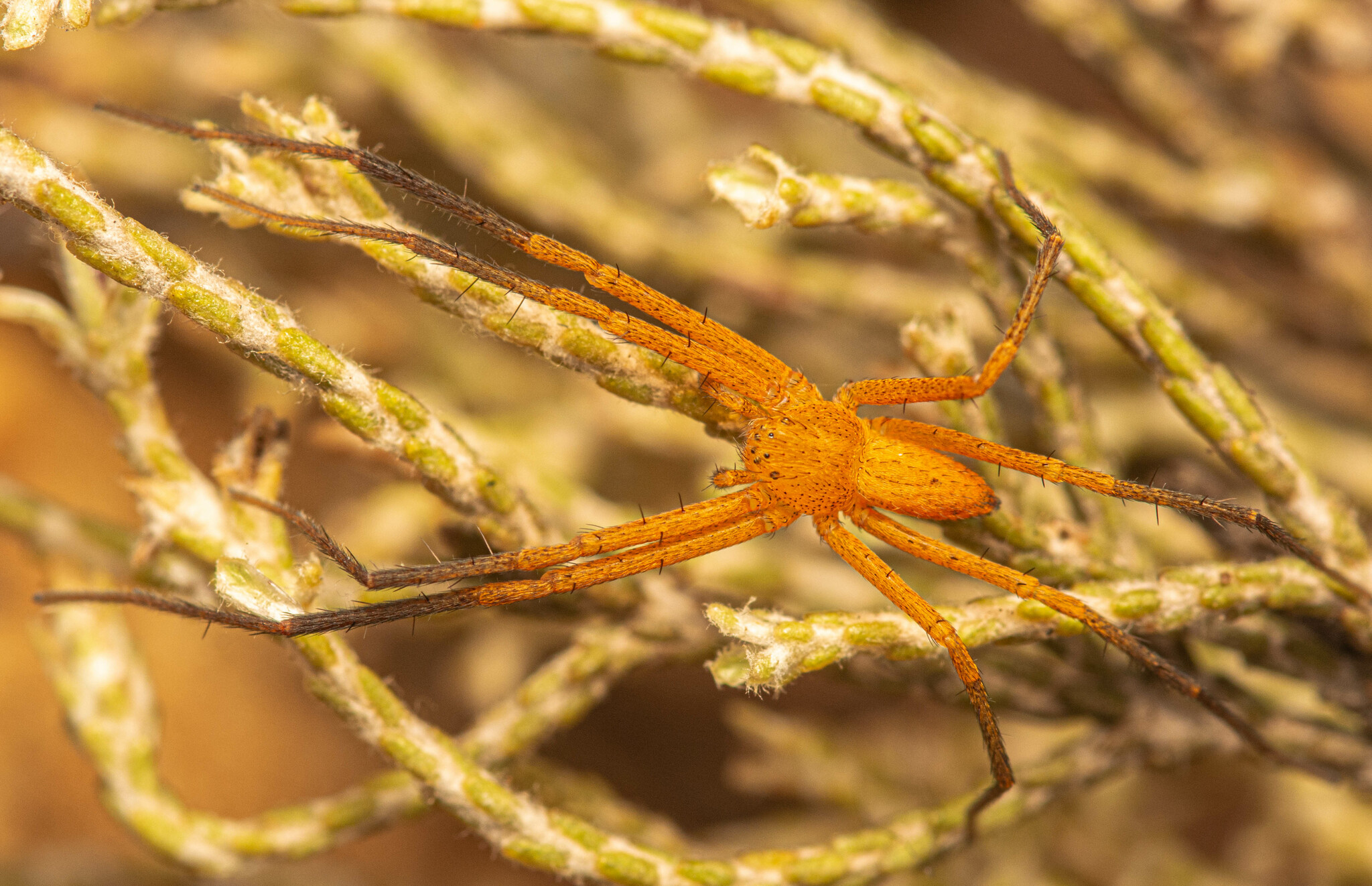
male

== Conservation ==
Suemus punctatus is listed as Least Concern by the South African National Biodiversity Institute due to its wide range. The species is protected in eight protected areas.

== Taxonomy ==
The species was originally described by Lawrence (1938) from Pietermaritzburg in KwaZulu-Natal. The genus has not been revised and the species is known from both sexes.
