= Philodromus vulgaris =

Scientific classification
- Domain: Eukaryota
- Kingdom: Animalia
- Phylum: Arthropoda
- Subphylum: Chelicerata
- Class: Arachnida
- Order: Araneae
- Infraorder: Araneomorphae
- Family: Philodromidae
- Genus: Philodromus
- Species: P. vulgaris

Binomial name
- Philodromus vulgaris (Hentz, 1847)

Species of spider

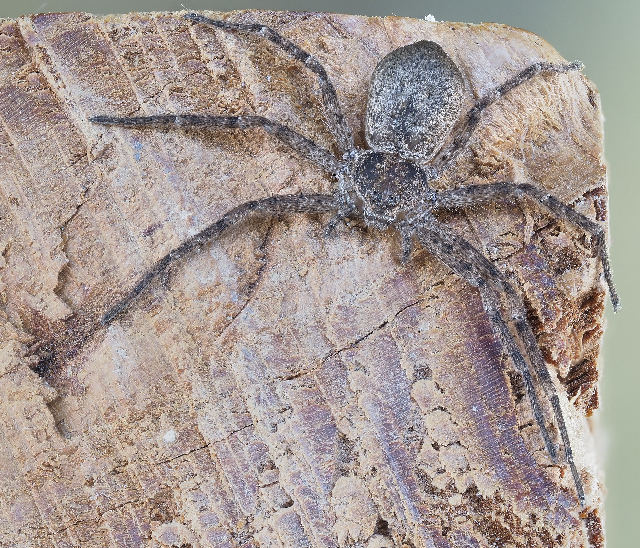

Philodromus vulgaris is a species of spider, commonly called the longlegged crab spider, in the genus Philodromus found in the USA and Canada.
