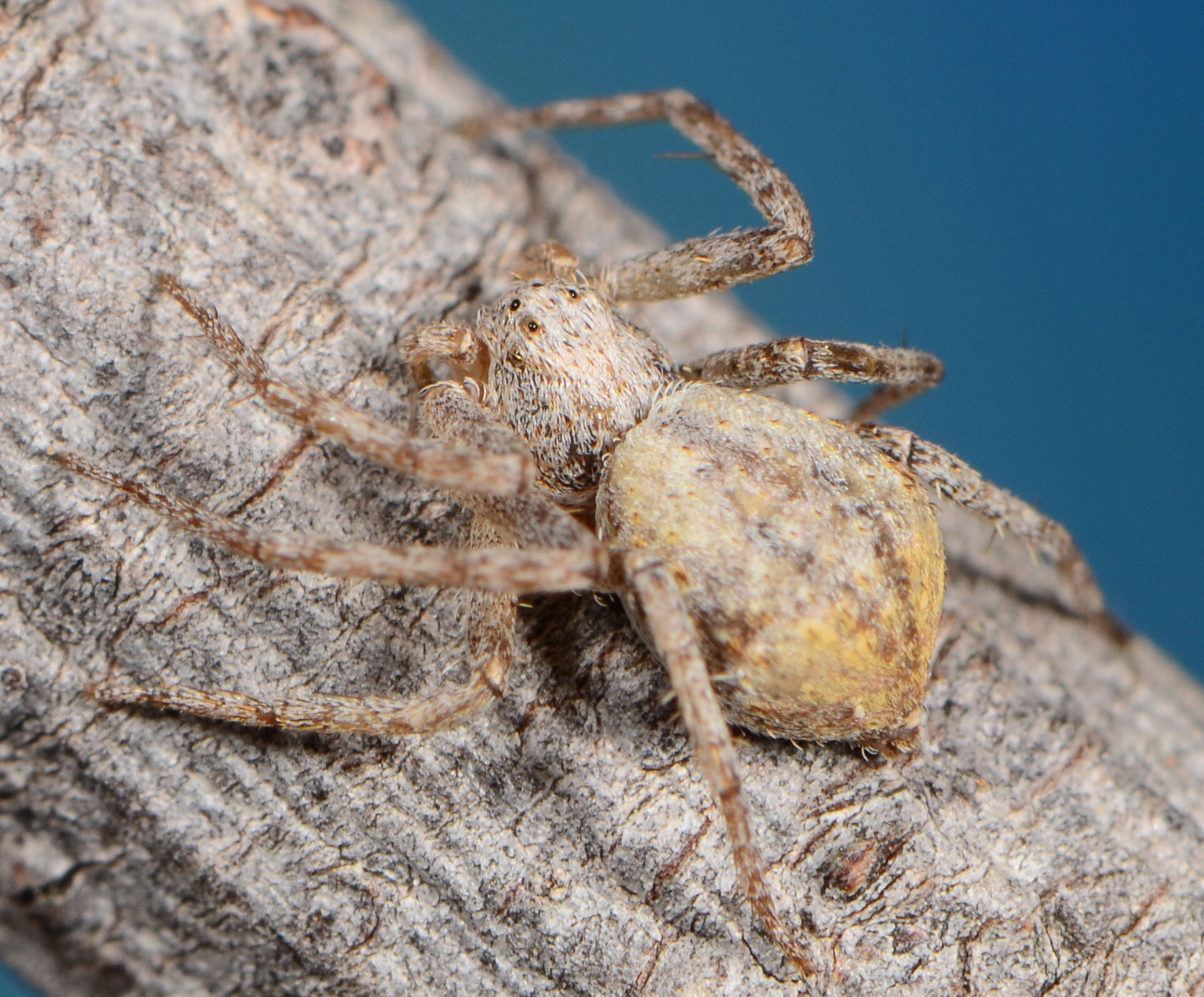
- female
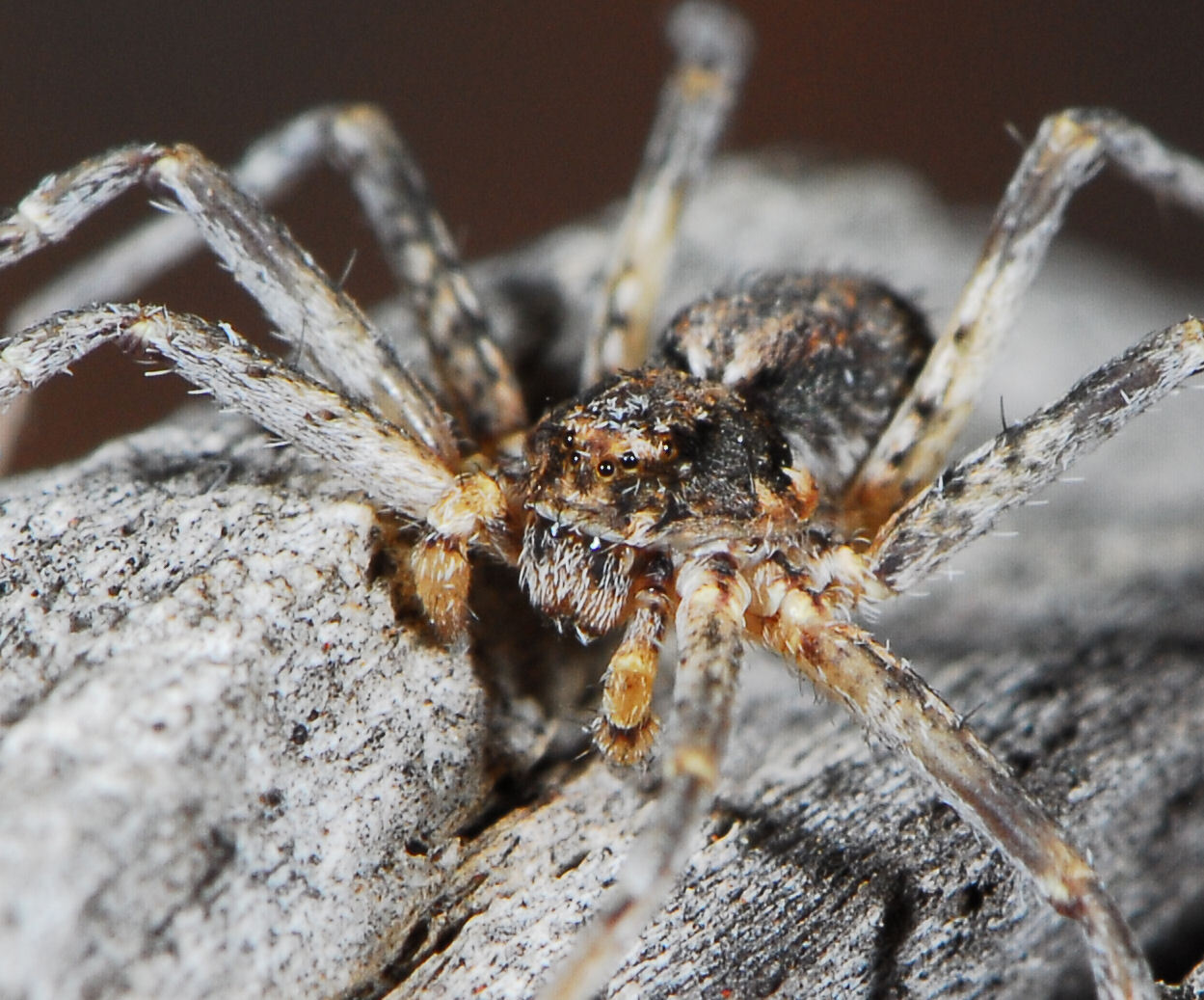
- male

Scientific classification
- Kingdom: Animalia
- Phylum: Arthropoda
- Subphylum: Chelicerata
- Class: Arachnida
- Order: Araneae
- Infraorder: Araneomorphae
- Family: Philodromidae
- Genus: Philodromus
- Species: P. browningi

Binomial name
- Philodromus browningi Lawrence, 1952

= Philodromus browningi =

Banded Running Spider

Species of spider

Philodromus browningi is a species of spider in the family Philodromidae. It is commonly known as the banded running spider.

== Distribution ==
Philodromus browningi is known from Zimbabwe, South Africa, and Eswatini. In South Africa, it is known from seven provinces including more than 10 protected areas, with an altitudinal range of 19-1730 m above sea level.

== Habitat and ecology ==
These are free-living plant dwellers sampled from vegetation. The species has been sampled from all the biomes except Desert and Succulent Karoo, and was also found in pecan and pistachio orchards.

== Description ==
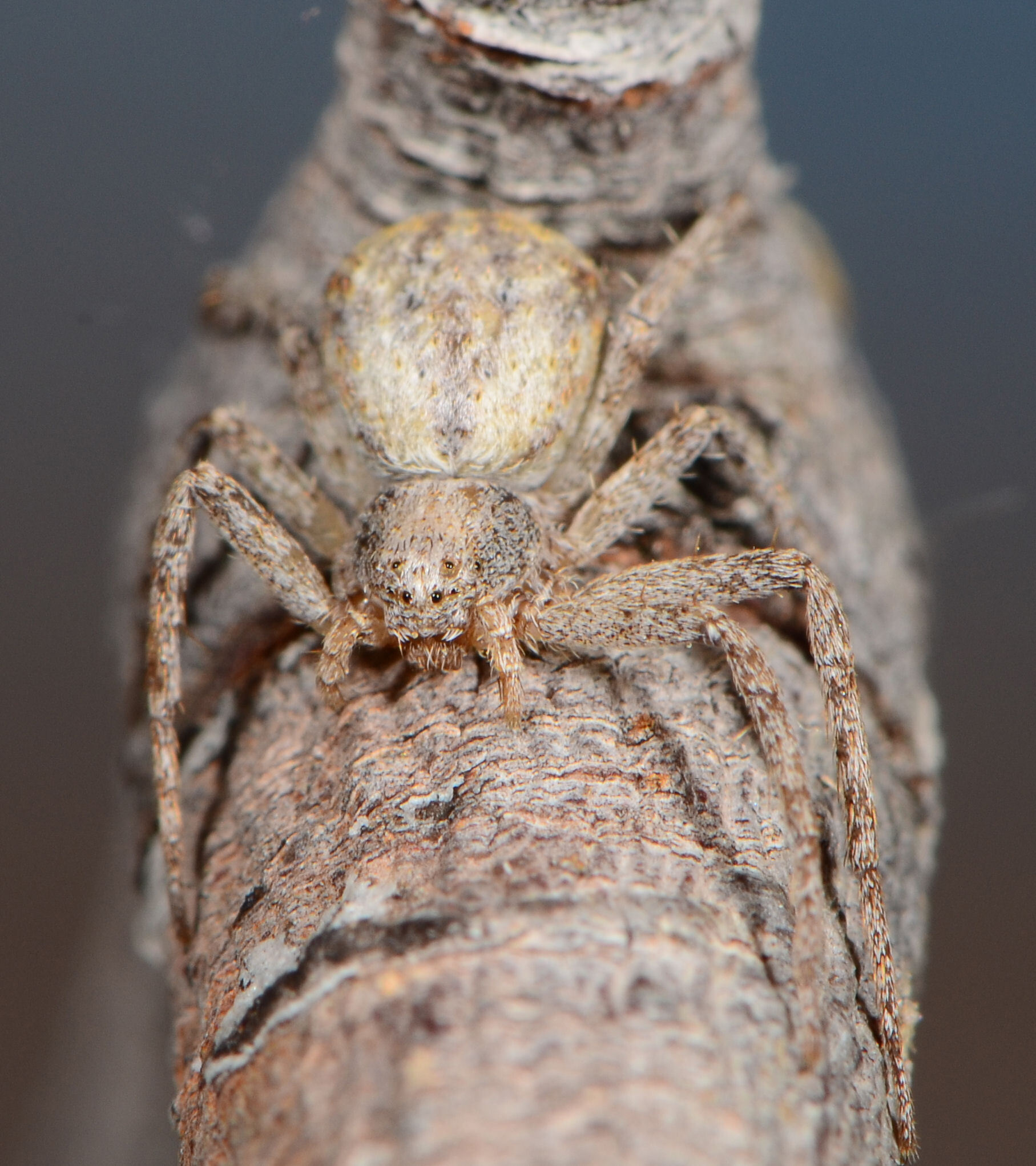
female

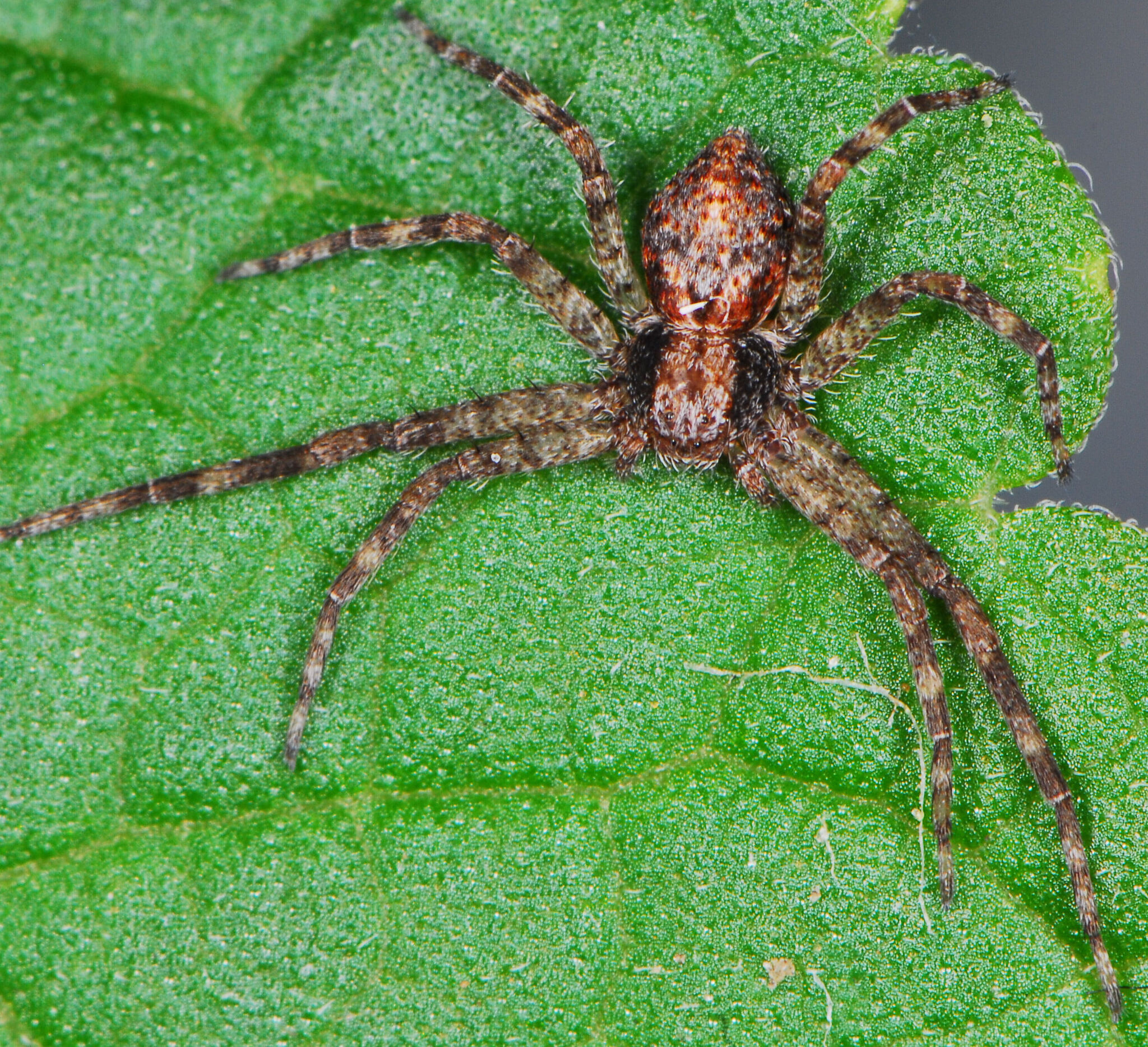
juvenile female

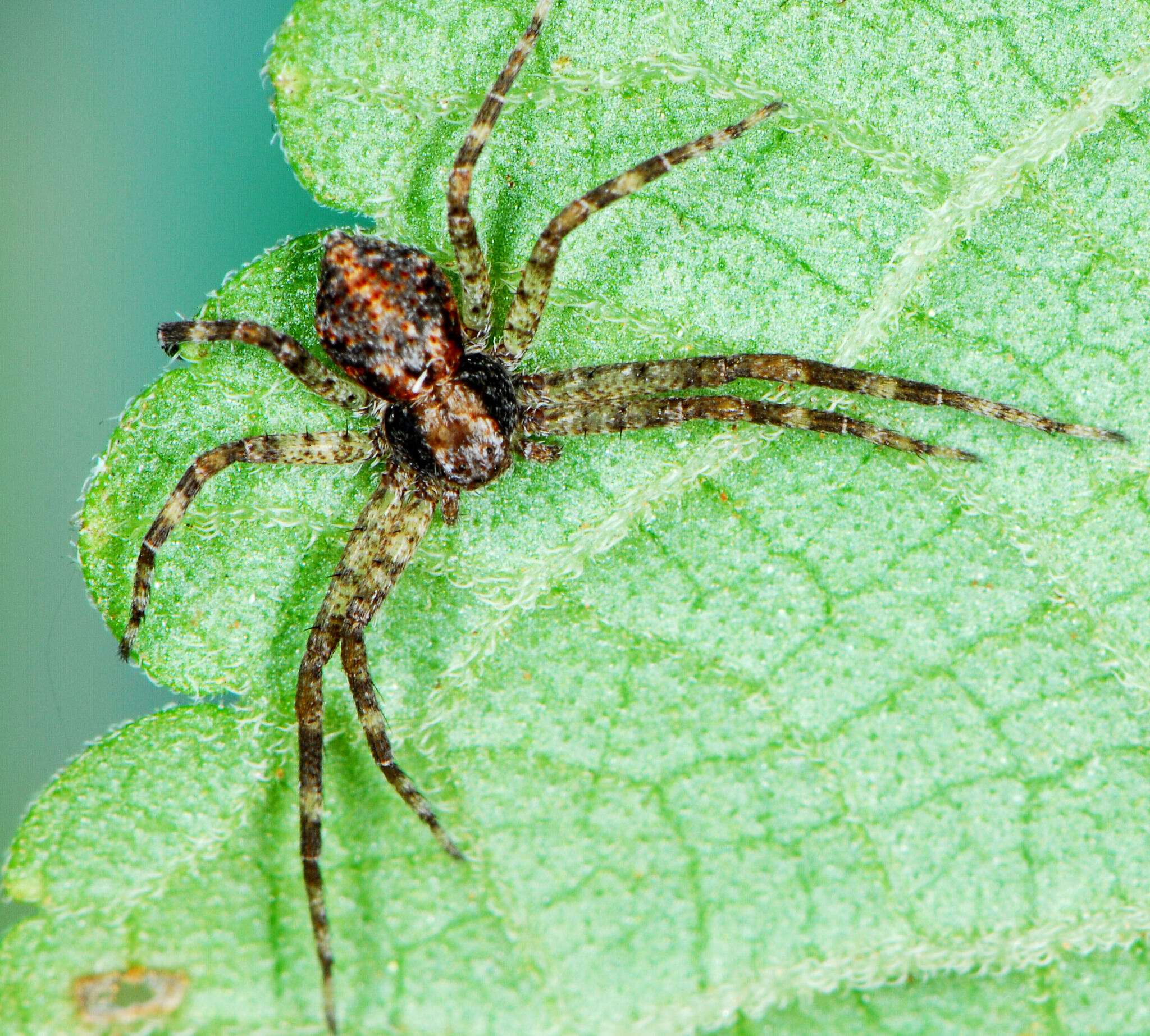
juvenile female

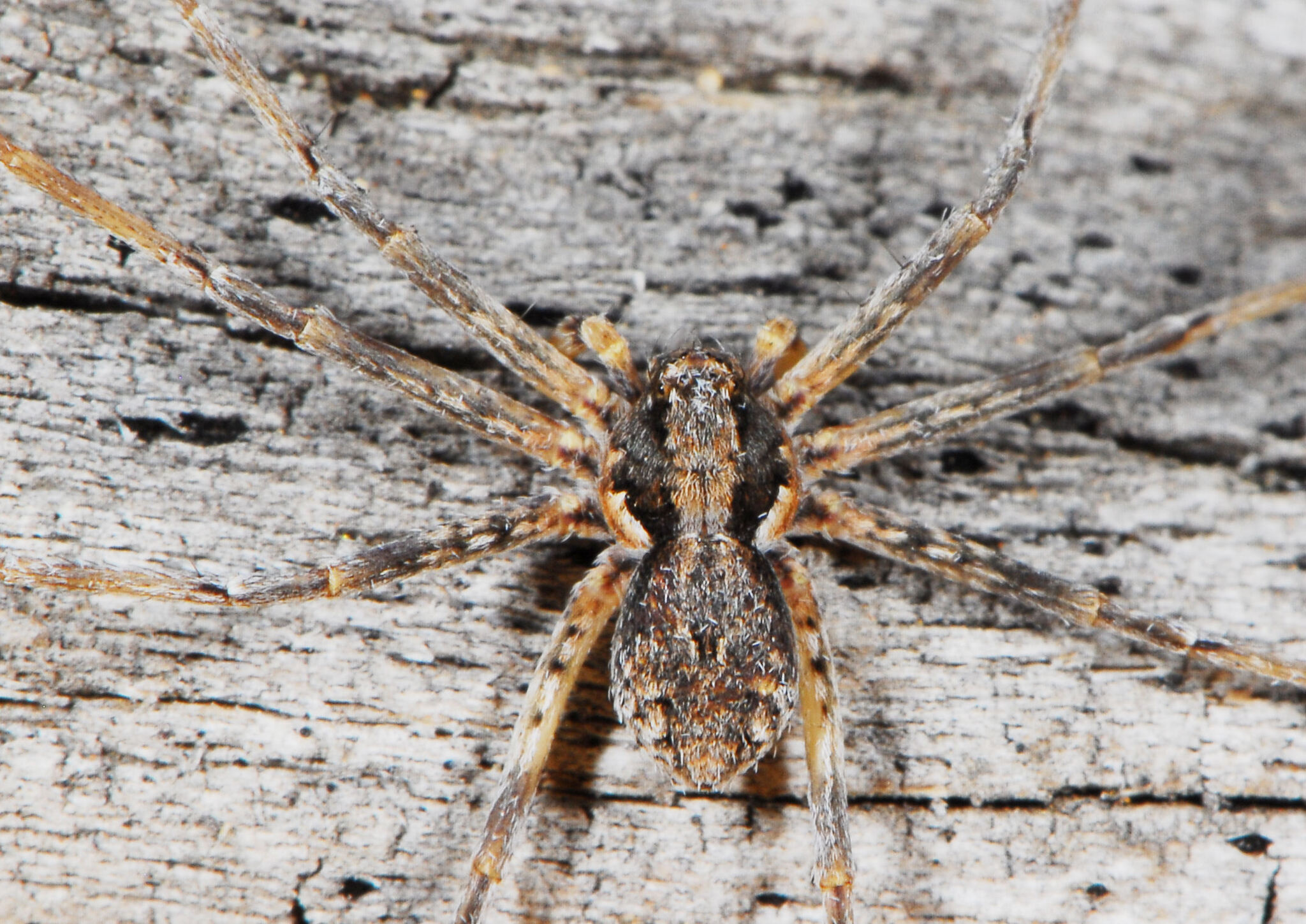
juvenile male

== Conservation ==
Philodromus browningi is listed as Least Concern by the South African National Biodiversity Institute due to its wide range. The species is known from more than 10 protected areas.

== Taxonomy ==
The species was originally described by Lawrence (1952) from Pietermaritzburg. The genus has not been revised and the species is known only from the female.
