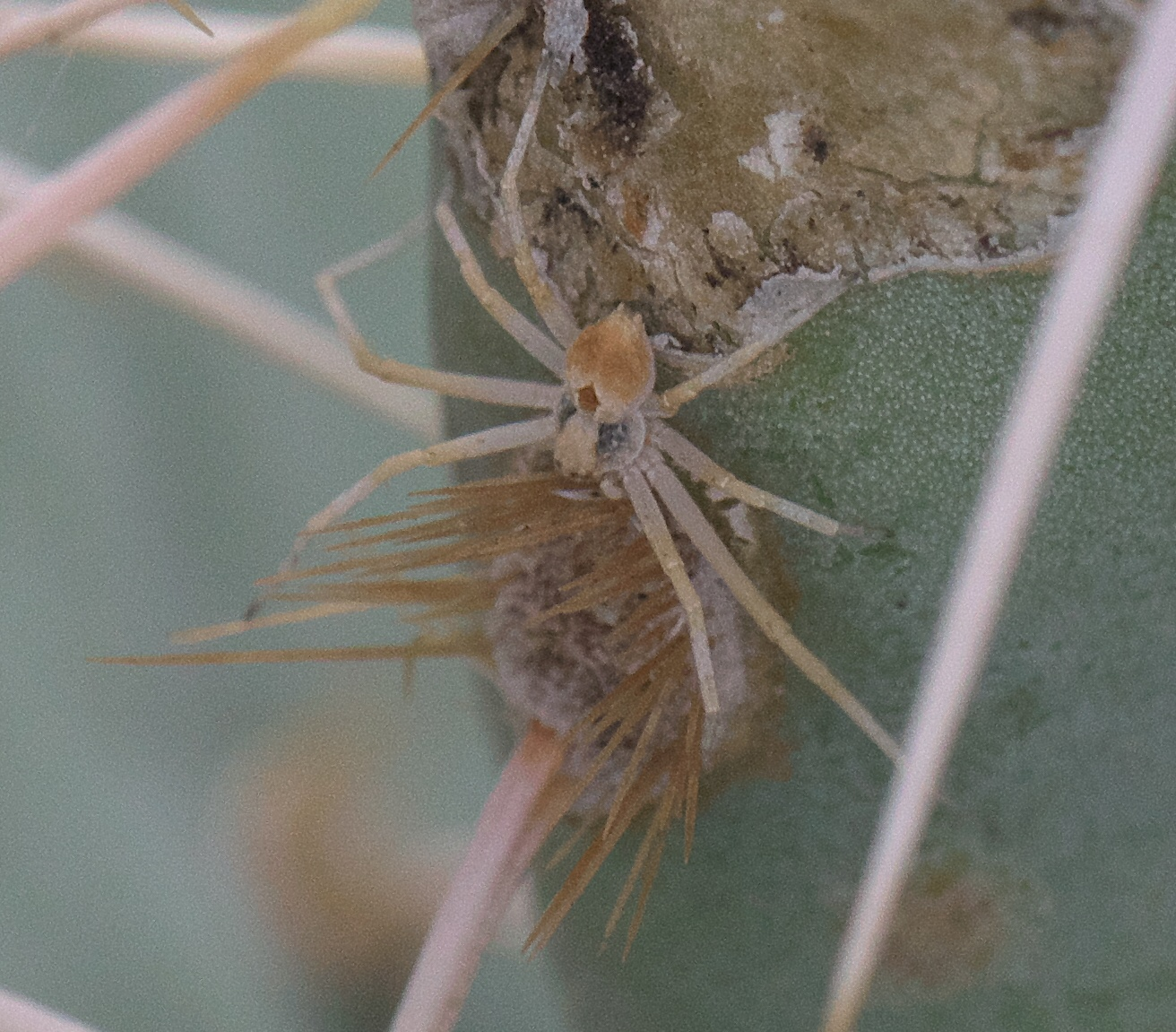
- Titanebo species

Scientific classification
- Kingdom: Animalia
- Phylum: Arthropoda
- Subphylum: Chelicerata
- Class: Arachnida
- Order: Araneae
- Infraorder: Araneomorphae
- Family: Philodromidae
- Genus: Titanebo; Gertsch, 1933

Type species
- T. macyi Gertsch, 1933

Species
- 14, see text

= Titanebo =

Genus of spiders

Titanebo is a genus of North American running crab spiders that was first described by Carl Eduard Adolph Gerstaecker in 1933.

== Species ==
As of June 2019 it contains fourteen species, found only in Mexico and the United States:

- Titanebo albocaudatus (Schick, 1965) – USA, Mexico
- Titanebo andreaannae (Schick, 1965) – USA
- Titanebo californicus Gertsch, 1933 – USA
- Titanebo cantralli (Sauer & Platnick, 1972) – USA
- Titanebo creosotis (Schick, 1965) – USA
- Titanebo dispar (Schick, 1965) – USA
- Titanebo dondalei (Sauer, 1968) – USA
- Titanebo macyi Gertsch, 1933 (type) – USA
- Titanebo magnificus Chamberlin & Ivie, 1942 – USA
- Titanebo mexicanus (Banks, 1898) – USA, Mexico
- Titanebo oblongus (Simon, 1895) – USA
- Titanebo parabolis (Schick, 1965) – USA
- Titanebo redneri (Cokendolpher, 1978) – USA
- Titanebo texanus Gertsch, 1933 – USA
