= Celerrimus =

Scientific classification
- Kingdom: Animalia
- Phylum: Arthropoda
- Subphylum: Chelicerata
- Class: Arachnida
- Order: Araneae
- Infraorder: Araneomorphae
- Family: Philodromidae
- Genus: Celerrimus; Lecigne, Cornic, Oger & Van Keer, 2019
- Species: C. duffeyi

Binomial name
- Celerrimus duffeyi Lecigne, 2019

Genus of spiders

Celerrimus is a monotypic genus of European running crab spiders containing the single species, Celerrimus duffeyi. It was first described by S. Lecigne, J.-F. Cornic and P. Oger in 2019.

== See also ==
- Philodromus
