= Psellonus =

Scientific classification
- Kingdom: Animalia
- Phylum: Arthropoda
- Subphylum: Chelicerata
- Class: Arachnida
- Order: Araneae
- Infraorder: Araneomorphae
- Family: Philodromidae
- Genus: Psellonus; Simon, 1897
- Species: P. planus

Binomial name
- Psellonus planus Simon, 1897

Genus of spiders

Psellonus is a monotypic genus of Indian running crab spiders containing the single species, Psellonus planus. It was first described by Eugène Louis Simon in 1897, and is only found in India.
