= Vacchellia =

Scientific classification
- Kingdom: Animalia
- Phylum: Arthropoda
- Subphylum: Chelicerata
- Class: Arachnida
- Order: Araneae
- Infraorder: Araneomorphae
- Family: Philodromidae
- Genus: Vacchellia; Caporiacco, 1935
- Species: V. baltoroi

Binomial name
- Vacchellia baltoroi Caporiacco, 1935

Genus of spiders

Vacchellia is a monotypic genus of running crab spiders containing the single species, Vacchellia baltoroi. It was first described by Lodovico di Caporiacco in 1935, and is only found in Karakorum.
