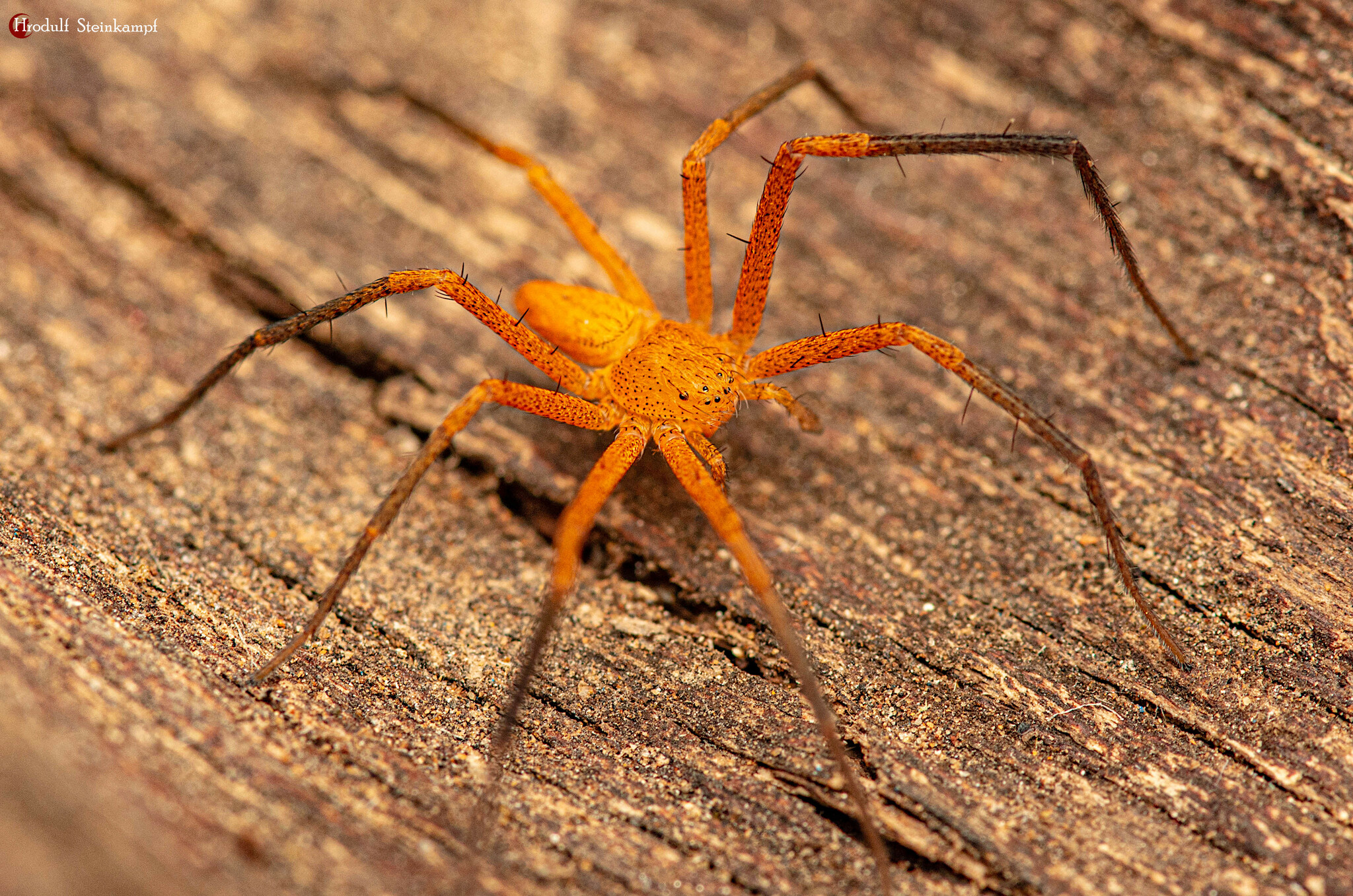
- male S. punctatus
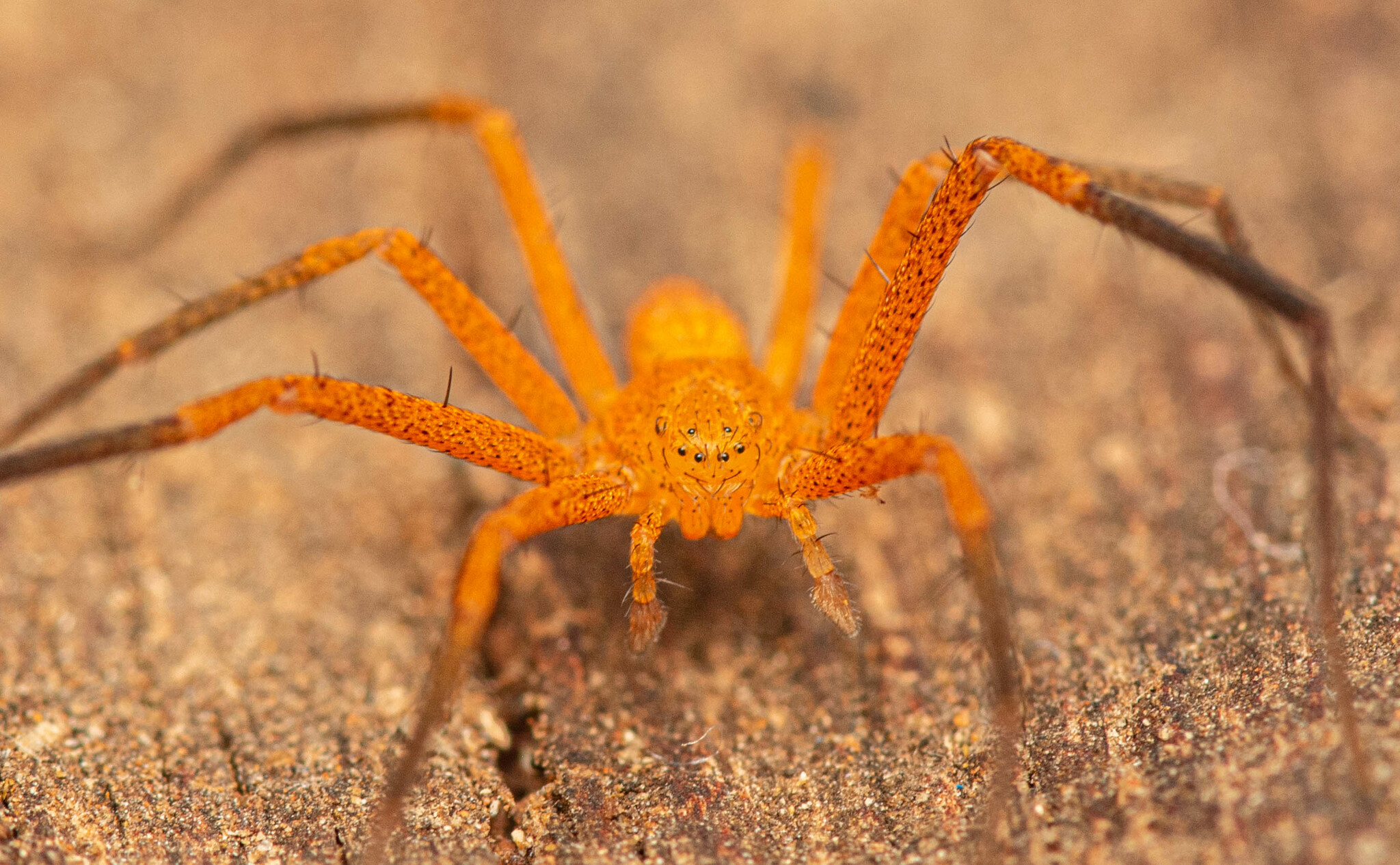
- male S. punctatus

Scientific classification
- Kingdom: Animalia
- Phylum: Arthropoda
- Subphylum: Chelicerata
- Class: Arachnida
- Order: Araneae
- Infraorder: Araneomorphae
- Family: Philodromidae
- Genus: Suemus; Simon, 1895

Type species
- S. atomarius Simon, 1895

Species
- 5, see text

= Suemus =

Genus of spiders

Suemus is a genus of running crab spiders that was first described by Eugène Simon in 1895.

== Description ==
Females of this genus are 5-7 mm in body size, while the males are smaller and more slender than the female. This small group of spiders is recognised by their flattened carapace, eye pattern and elongated abdomen. The body is covered with small spots. The front legs are longer than the rest.

Body and leg colour varies from cream to brown or bright orange, with numerous dark spots. The carapace is oval with a narrow clypeus. Eyes are arranged in eight in two rows with the posterior eye row very strongly recurved and the posterior lateral eyes positioned away from the rest of the eyes. The abdomen is elongate-oval. Legs are long and slender, with the distal segments of anterior legs of males being black.

== Species ==
As of September 2025 it contains five species, found only in Africa and Vietnam:

- Suemus atomarius Simon, 1895 (type) – Sierra Leone
- Suemus orientalis Simon, 1909 – Vietnam
- Suemus punctatus Lawrence, 1938 – Zimbabwe, Mozambique, South Africa, Eswatini
- Suemus tibelliformis Simon, 1909 – Vietnam
- Suemus tibelloides Caporiacco, 1947 – East Africa
