= Cleocnemis =

Scientific classification
- Kingdom: Animalia
- Phylum: Arthropoda
- Subphylum: Chelicerata
- Class: Arachnida
- Order: Araneae
- Infraorder: Araneomorphae
- Family: Philodromidae
- Genus: Cleocnemis; Simon, 1886

Type species
- C. heteropoda Simon, 1886

Species
- 8, see text

Synonyms
- Berlandiella Mello-Leitão, 1929; Metacleocnemis Mello-Leitão, 1929

Genus of spiders

Cleocnemis is a genus of South American running crab spiders that was first described by Eugène Louis Simon in 1886.

== Species ==
As of September 2022 it contains eight species, found only in South America:

- Cleocnemis heteropoda Simon, 1886 (type) – Brazil
- Cleocnemis insignis (Mello-Leitão, 1929) – Brazil
- Cleocnemis lanceolata Mello-Leitão, 1929 – Brazil
- Cleocnemis magna (Mello-Leitão, 1929) – Brazil
- Cleocnemis mutilata (Mello-Leitão, 1917) – Brazil
- Cleocnemis querencia (Lise & Silva, 2011) – Brazil
- Cleocnemis robertae (Lise & Silva, 2011) – Brazil, Argentina
- Cleocnemis zabele (Pantoja, Drago-Bisneto & Saturnino, 2020) – Brazil
