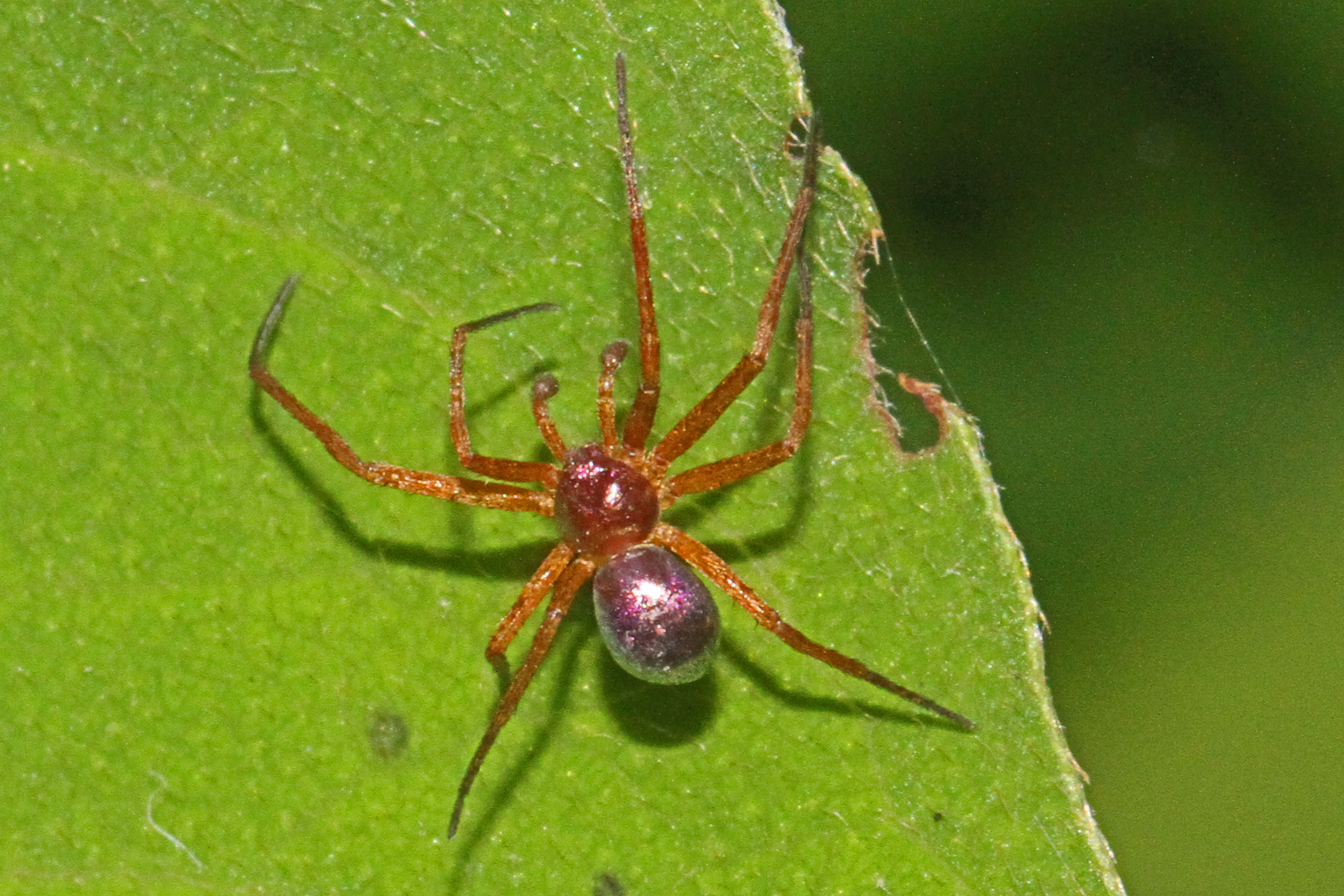

Scientific classification
- Domain: Eukaryota
- Kingdom: Animalia
- Phylum: Arthropoda
- Subphylum: Chelicerata
- Class: Arachnida
- Order: Araneae
- Infraorder: Araneomorphae
- Family: Philodromidae
- Genus: Philodromus
- Species: P. marxi

Binomial name
- Philodromus marxi Keyserling, 1884

= Philodromus marxi =

Species of spider

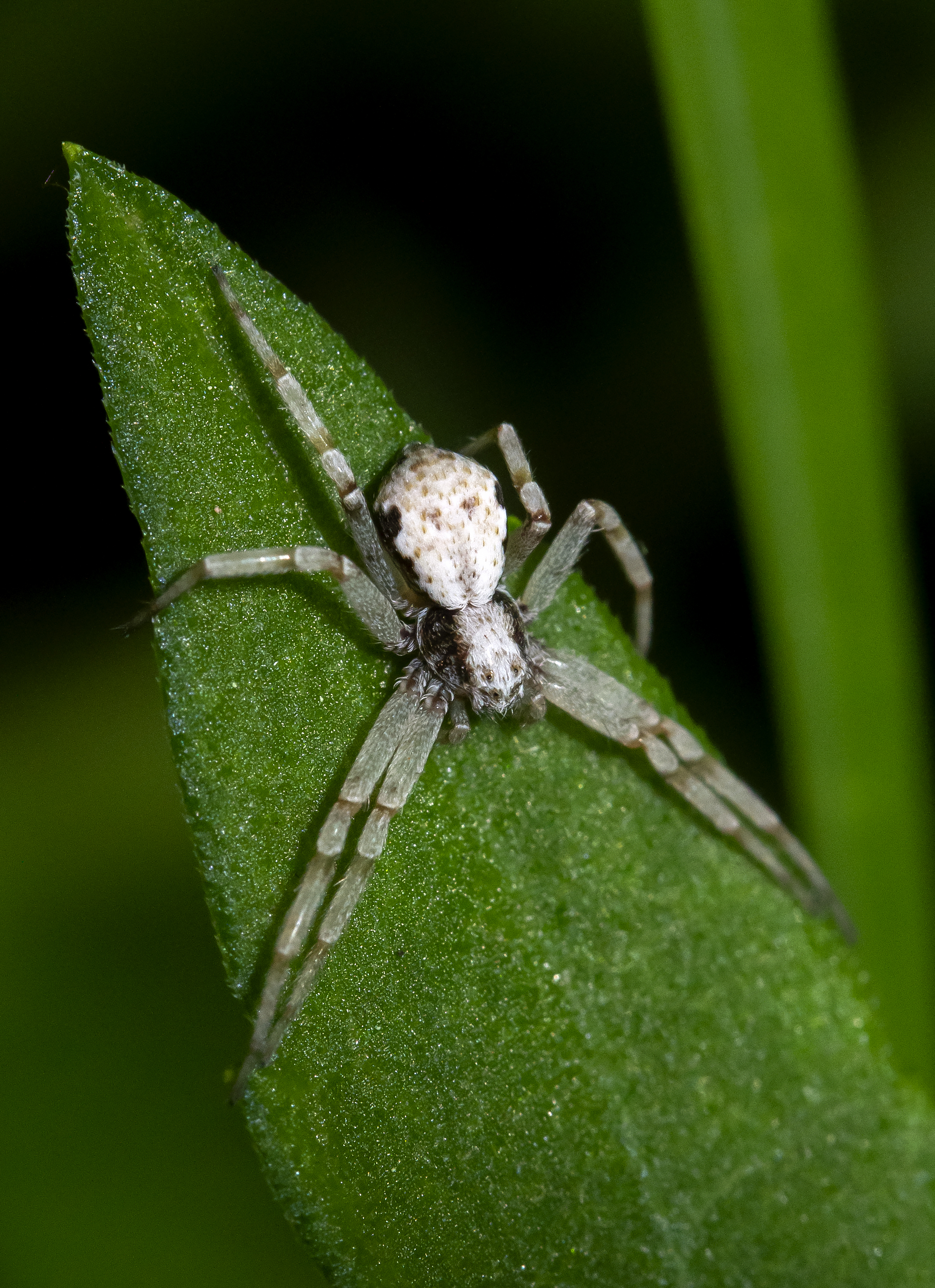

Philodromus marxi, the metallic crab spider, is a species of running crab spider in the family Philodromidae. It is found in the United States. It is a sexually dimorphic species. The males are smooth with a metallic sheen and the females are bristly white and grey.

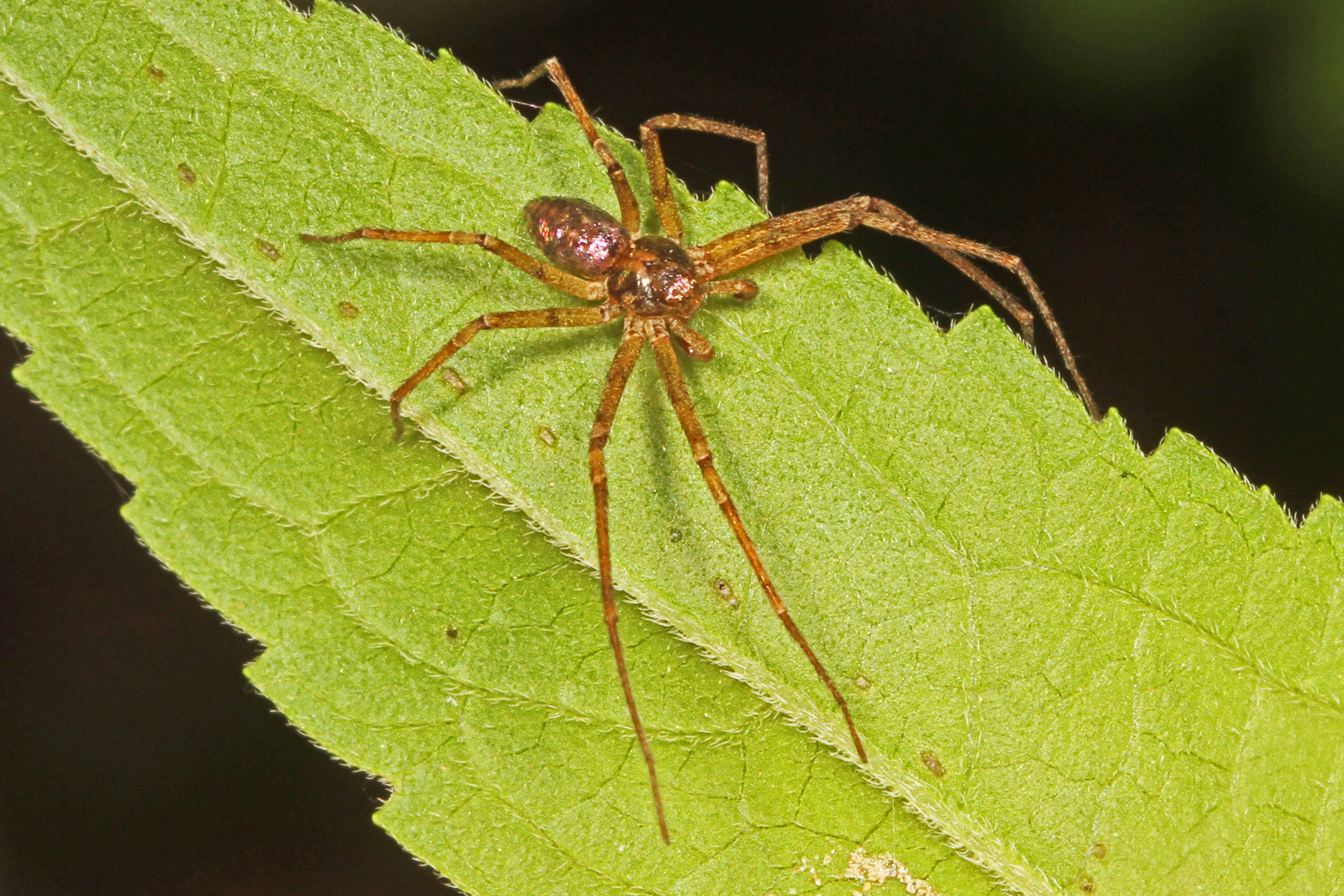
Metallic crab spider, Philodromus marxi
