= Philodromops =

Scientific classification
- Kingdom: Animalia
- Phylum: Arthropoda
- Subphylum: Chelicerata
- Class: Arachnida
- Order: Araneae
- Infraorder: Araneomorphae
- Family: Philodromidae
- Genus: Philodromops; Mello-Leitão, 1943
- Species: P. coccineus

Binomial name
- Philodromops coccineus Mello-Leitão, 1943

Genus of spiders

Philodromops is a monotypic genus of Brazilian running crab spiders containing the single species, Philodromops coccineus. It was first described by Cândido Firmino de Mello-Leitão in 1943, and is only found in Brazil.
