= Procleocnemis =

Scientific classification
- Kingdom: Animalia
- Phylum: Arthropoda
- Subphylum: Chelicerata
- Class: Arachnida
- Order: Araneae
- Infraorder: Araneomorphae
- Family: Philodromidae
- Genus: Procleocnemis; Mello-Leitão, 1929
- Species: P. concolor

Binomial name
- Procleocnemis concolor Mello-Leitão, 1929

Genus of spiders

Procleocnemis is a monotypic genus of Brazilian running crab spiders containing the single species, Procleocnemis concolor. It was first described by Cândido Firmino de Mello-Leitão in 1929, and is only found in Brazil.
