= Bacillocnemis =

Scientific classification
- Kingdom: Animalia
- Phylum: Arthropoda
- Subphylum: Chelicerata
- Class: Arachnida
- Order: Araneae
- Infraorder: Araneomorphae
- Family: Philodromidae
- Genus: Bacillocnemis; Mello-Leitão, 1938
- Species: B. anomala

Binomial name
- Bacillocnemis anomala Mello-Leitão, 1938

Genus of spiders

Bacillocnemis is a monotypic genus of Argentinian running crab spiders containing the single species, Bacillocnemis anomala. It was first described by Cândido Firmino de Mello-Leitão in 1938, and is only found in Argentina.
