= Pseudopsellonus =

Scientific classification
- Kingdom: Animalia
- Phylum: Arthropoda
- Subphylum: Chelicerata
- Class: Arachnida
- Order: Araneae
- Infraorder: Araneomorphae
- Family: Philodromidae
- Genus: Pseudopsellonus; Balogh, 1936
- Species: P. papuanus

Binomial name
- Pseudopsellonus papuanus Balogh, 1936

Genus of spiders

Pseudopsellonus is a monotypic genus of Papuan running crab spiders containing the single species, Pseudopsellonus papuanus. It was first described by J. I. Balogh in 1936, and is only found in Papua New Guinea.
