= Gephyrellula =

Scientific classification
- Kingdom: Animalia
- Phylum: Arthropoda
- Subphylum: Chelicerata
- Class: Arachnida
- Order: Araneae
- Infraorder: Araneomorphae
- Family: Philodromidae
- Genus: Gephyrellula; Strand, 1932
- Species: G. violacea

Binomial name
- Gephyrellula violacea (Mello-Leitão, 1918)

Genus of spiders

Gephyrellula is a monotypic genus of Brazilian running crab spiders containing the single species, Gephyrellula violacea. It was first described by Embrik Strand in 1932, and is only found in Brazil.
