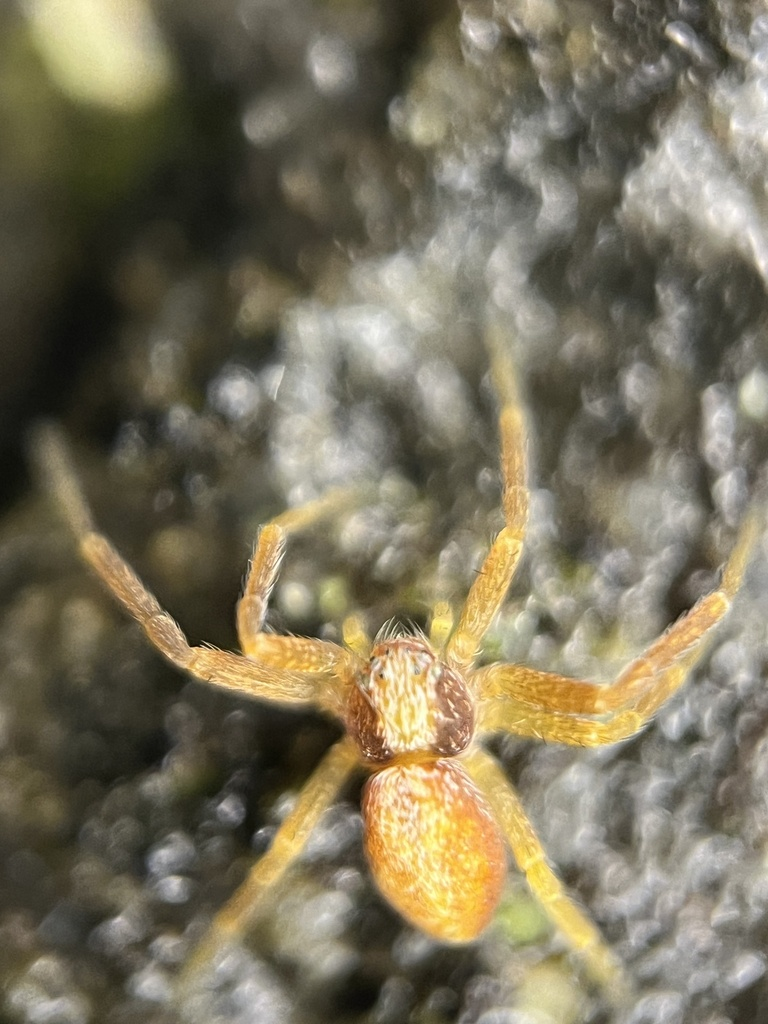

Scientific classification
- Domain: Eukaryota
- Kingdom: Animalia
- Phylum: Arthropoda
- Subphylum: Chelicerata
- Class: Arachnida
- Order: Araneae
- Infraorder: Araneomorphae
- Family: Philodromidae
- Genus: Philodromus
- Species: P. rufus
- Subspecies: P. r. pacificus

Trinomial name
- Philodromus rufus pacificus Banks, 1898

= Philodromus rufus pacificus =

Subspecies of spider

Philodromus rufus pacificus is a subspecies of running crab spider native to the Pacific Northwest exclusively and endemic to the United States.

== Appearance ==
This spider is identified by its completely light grey eyes, a bullet-shaped abdomen, and a more spread out leg structure than their parent species. This subspecies is exclusive to the west coast of North America.
