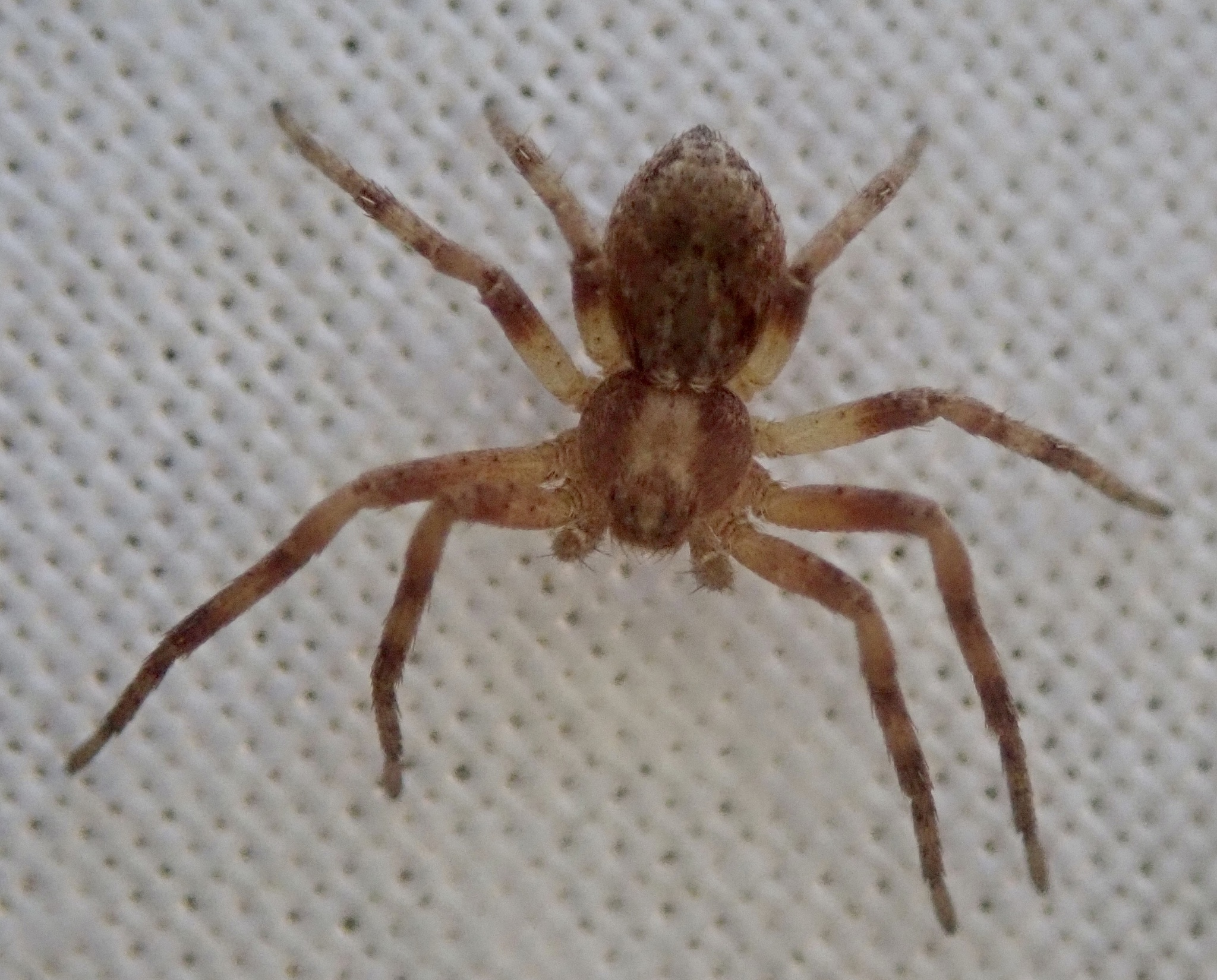

Scientific classification
- Kingdom: Animalia
- Phylum: Arthropoda
- Subphylum: Chelicerata
- Class: Arachnida
- Order: Araneae
- Infraorder: Araneomorphae
- Family: Philodromidae
- Genus: Philodromus
- Species: P. buchari

Binomial name
- Philodromus buchari Kubcová, 2004

= Philodromus buchari =

Species of spider

Philodromus buchari is a species of spider in the family Philodromidae. It is found in Europe and Georgia.
