= Philodromus lunatus =

Scientific classification
- Kingdom: Animalia
- Phylum: Arthropoda
- Subphylum: Chelicerata
- Class: Arachnida
- Order: Araneae
- Infraorder: Araneomorphae
- Family: Philodromidae
- Genus: Philodromus
- Species: P. lunatus

Binomial name
- Philodromus lunatus Muster & Thaler, 2004

Species of spider

Philodromus lunatus is a spider species found in Croatia, Albania, Greece, Cyprus, and Turkey.
