= Philodromus exilis =

Scientific classification
- Domain: Eukaryota
- Kingdom: Animalia
- Phylum: Arthropoda
- Subphylum: Chelicerata
- Class: Arachnida
- Order: Araneae
- Infraorder: Araneomorphae
- Family: Philodromidae
- Genus: Philodromus
- Species: P. exilis

Binomial name
- Philodromus exilis Banks, 1892

Species of spider

Philodromus exilis is a species of running crab spider in the family Philodromidae. It is found in the United States and Canada.
