= Philodromus vulpio =

Scientific classification
- Kingdom: Animalia
- Phylum: Arthropoda
- Subphylum: Chelicerata
- Class: Arachnida
- Order: Araneae
- Infraorder: Araneomorphae
- Family: Philodromidae
- Genus: Philodromus
- Species: P. vulpio

Binomial name
- Philodromus vulpio Simon, 1910

Species of spider

Philodromus vulpio is a species of spider in the family Philodromidae.

== Distribution ==
Philodromus vulpio is endemic to South Africa. The species is known only from a type locality in Little Namaqualand in the Northern Cape.

== Habitat and ecology ==
These are free-living plant dwellers sampled from vegetation in the Succulent Karoo biome.

== Conservation ==
Philodromus vulpio is listed as Data Deficient for Taxonomic reasons. The species is a Northern Cape endemic known only from a type locality in Little Namaqualand. The status of the species remains obscure and more sampling is needed to collect the male and determine the species range.

== Taxonomy ==
The species was originally described by Eugène Simon (1910) and is known only from a type locality in Little Namaqualand. The genus has not been revised and the species is known only from the female.
