= Philodromus lividus =

Scientific classification
- Kingdom: Animalia
- Phylum: Arthropoda
- Subphylum: Chelicerata
- Class: Arachnida
- Order: Araneae
- Infraorder: Araneomorphae
- Family: Philodromidae
- Genus: Philodromus
- Species: P. lividus

Binomial name
- Philodromus lividus Simon, 1875

Species of spider

Philodromus lividus is a spider species found in Europe (Portugal, Spain, France, Italy, Malta, Croatia, Albania, Greece) and North Africa (Morocco, Algeria).
