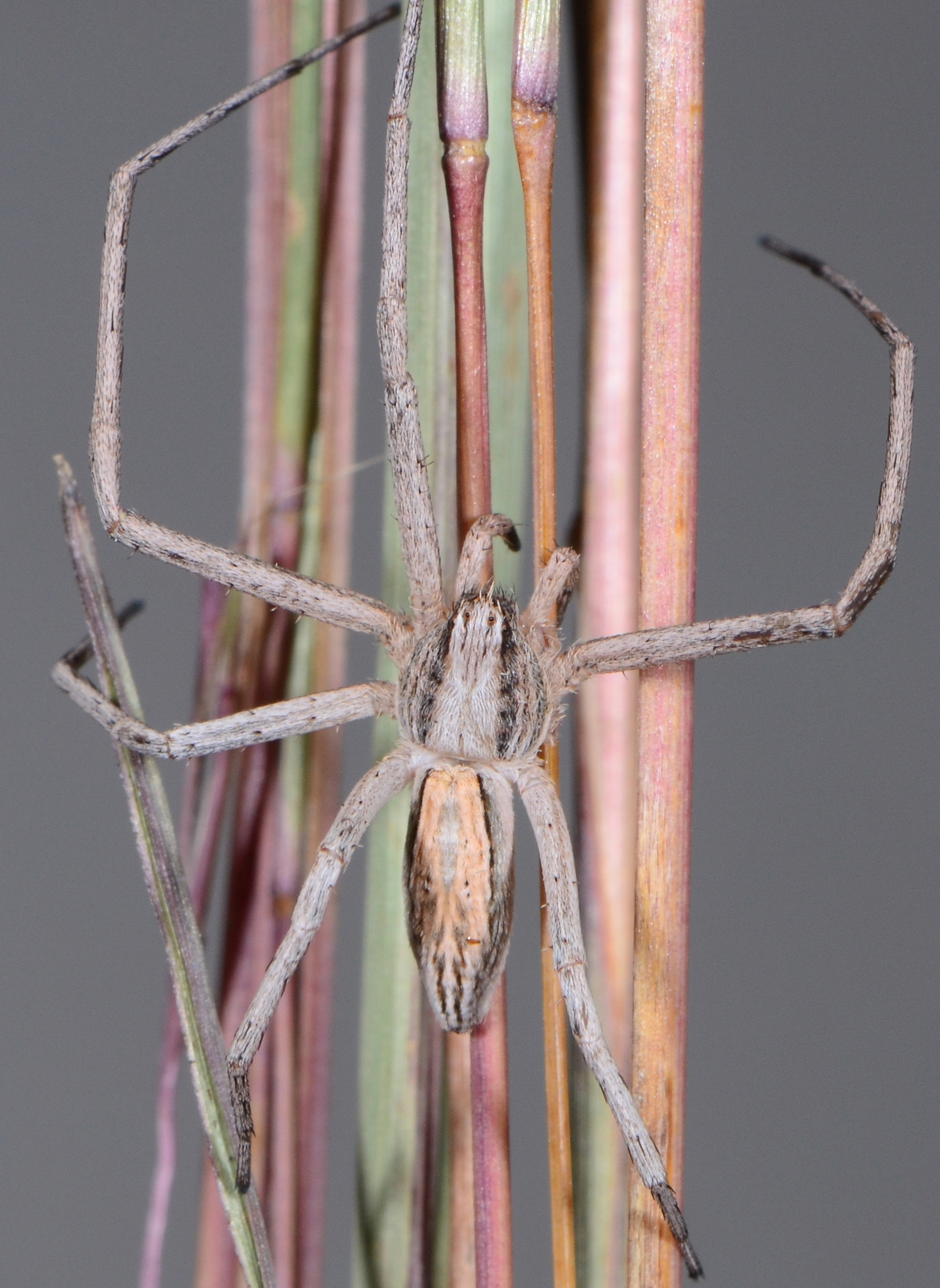
- female
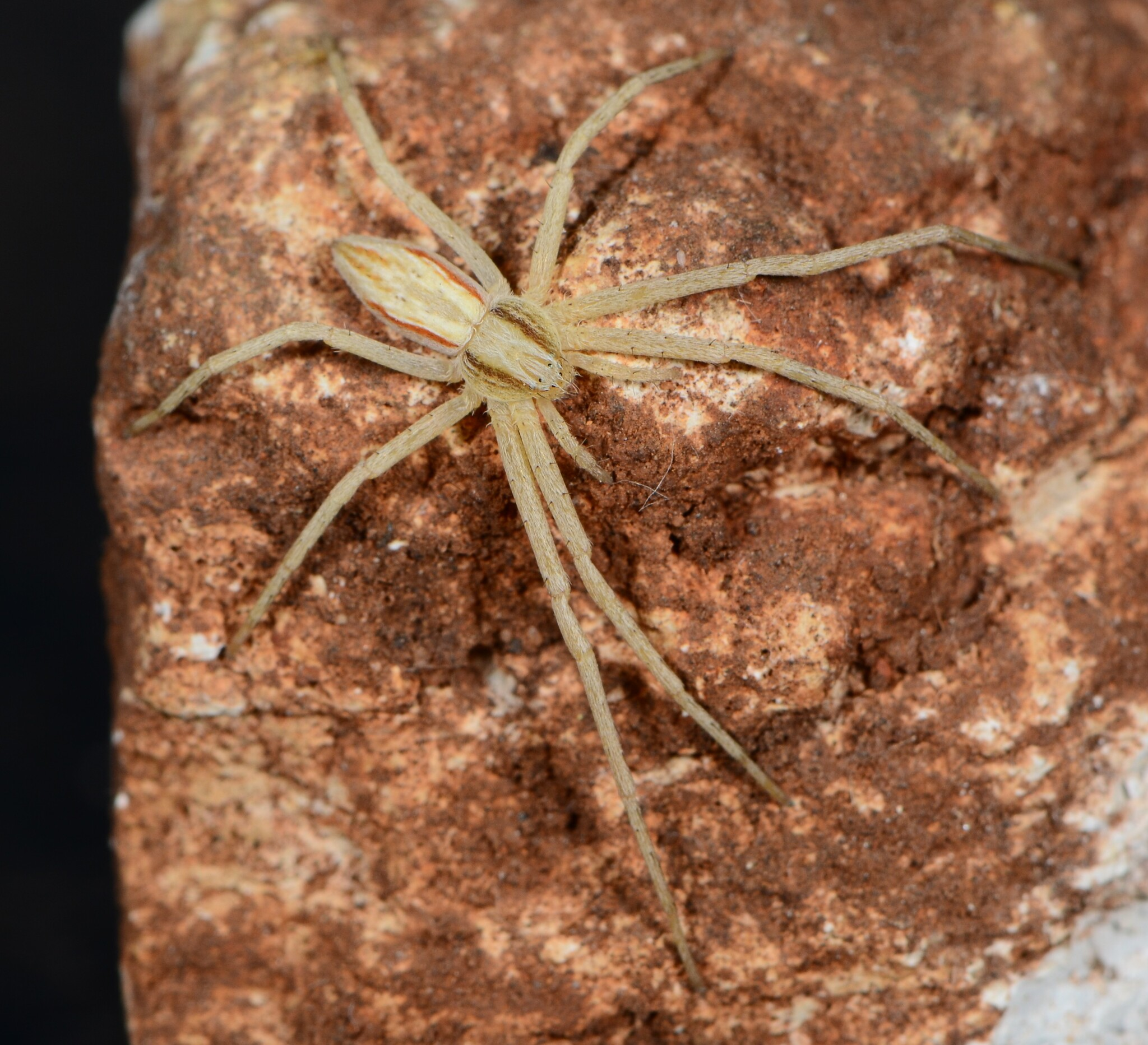
- female

Scientific classification
- Kingdom: Animalia
- Phylum: Arthropoda
- Subphylum: Chelicerata
- Class: Arachnida
- Order: Araneae
- Infraorder: Araneomorphae
- Family: Philodromidae
- Genus: Philodromus
- Species: P. partitus

Binomial name
- Philodromus partitus Lessert, 1919

= Philodromus partitus =

Long Bodied Running Spider

Species of spider

Philodromus partitus is a species of spider in the family Philodromidae. It is commonly known as the long bodied running spider.

== Distribution ==
Philodromus partitus is known from Tanzania, Zimbabwe, and South Africa. In South Africa, it is sampled from four provinces including five protected areas, with an altitudinal range of 30-1299 m above sea level.

== Habitat and ecology ==
These are free-living plant dwellers sampled from grasses in the Indian Ocean Coastal Belt, Savanna and Thicket biomes.

== Description ==
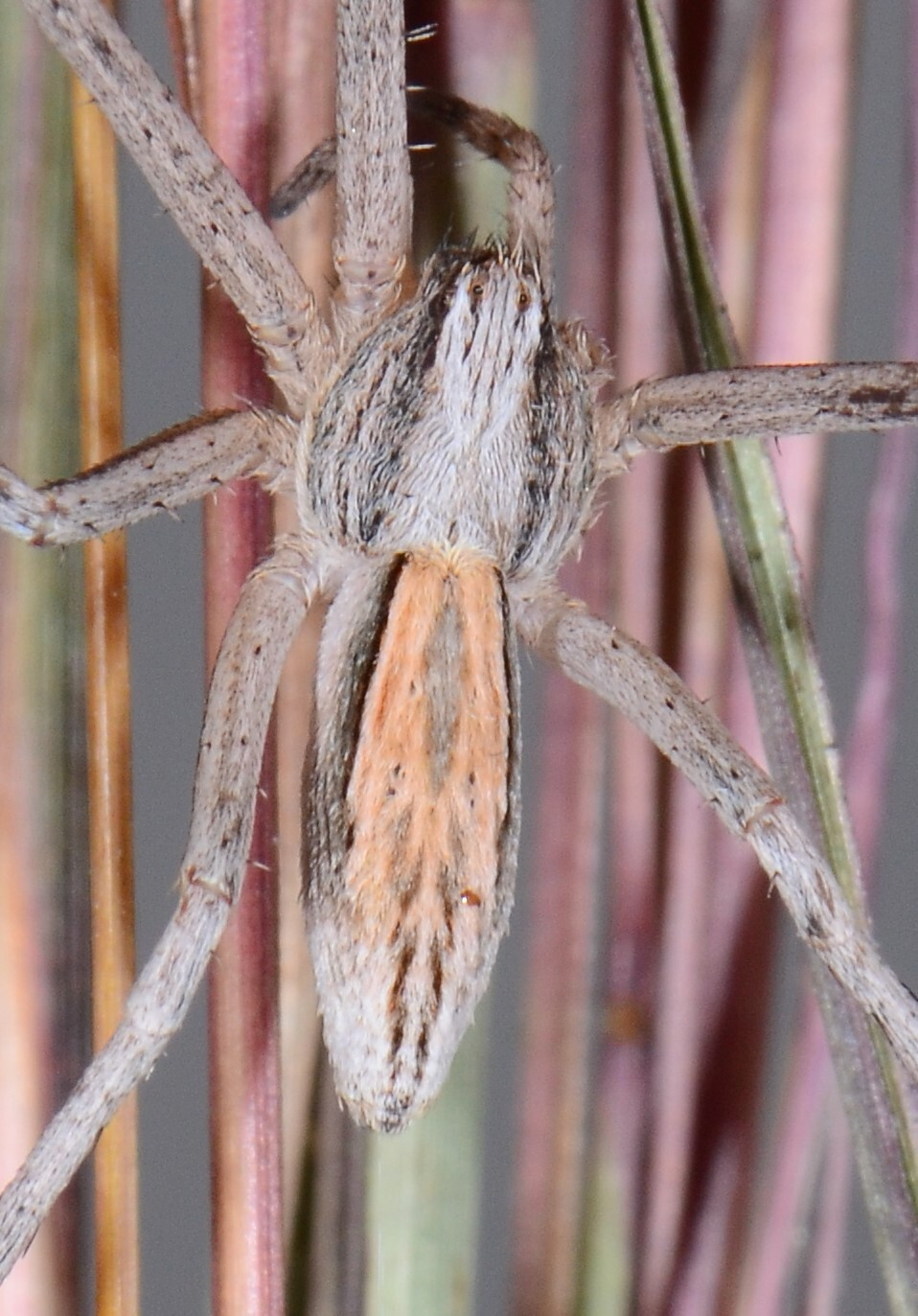
female

== Conservation ==
Philodromus partitus is listed as Least Concern by the South African National Biodiversity Institute due to its wide range. The species is protected in five protected areas.

== Taxonomy ==
The species was originally described by Roger de Lessert (1919) from Tanzania. The genus has not been revised and the species is known only from the female.
