= Philodromus catagraphus =

Scientific classification
- Kingdom: Animalia
- Phylum: Arthropoda
- Subphylum: Chelicerata
- Class: Arachnida
- Order: Araneae
- Infraorder: Araneomorphae
- Family: Philodromidae
- Genus: Philodromus
- Species: P. catagraphus

Binomial name
- Philodromus catagraphus Simon, 1870

Species of spider

Philodromus catagraphus is a spider species found in Spain.
