= Philodromus monitae =

Scientific classification
- Kingdom: Animalia
- Phylum: Arthropoda
- Subphylum: Chelicerata
- Class: Arachnida
- Order: Araneae
- Infraorder: Araneomorphae
- Family: Philodromidae
- Genus: Philodromus
- Species: P. monitae

Binomial name
- Philodromus monitae Muster & Van Keer, 2010

Species of spider

Philodromus monitae is a spider species found in Greece.
