= Philodromus spectabilis =

Scientific classification
- Domain: Eukaryota
- Kingdom: Animalia
- Phylum: Arthropoda
- Subphylum: Chelicerata
- Class: Arachnida
- Order: Araneae
- Infraorder: Araneomorphae
- Family: Philodromidae
- Genus: Philodromus
- Species: P. spectabilis

Binomial name
- Philodromus spectabilis Keyserling, 1880

Species of spider

Philodromus spectabilis is a species of running crab spider in the family Philodromidae. It is found in the USA and Canada.
