= Philodromus cammarus =

Scientific classification
- Kingdom: Animalia
- Phylum: Arthropoda
- Subphylum: Chelicerata
- Class: Arachnida
- Order: Araneae
- Infraorder: Araneomorphae
- Family: Philodromidae
- Genus: Philodromus
- Species: P. cammarus

Binomial name
- Philodromus cammarus Rossi, 1846

Species of spider

Philodromus cammarus is a spider species found in Croatia.
