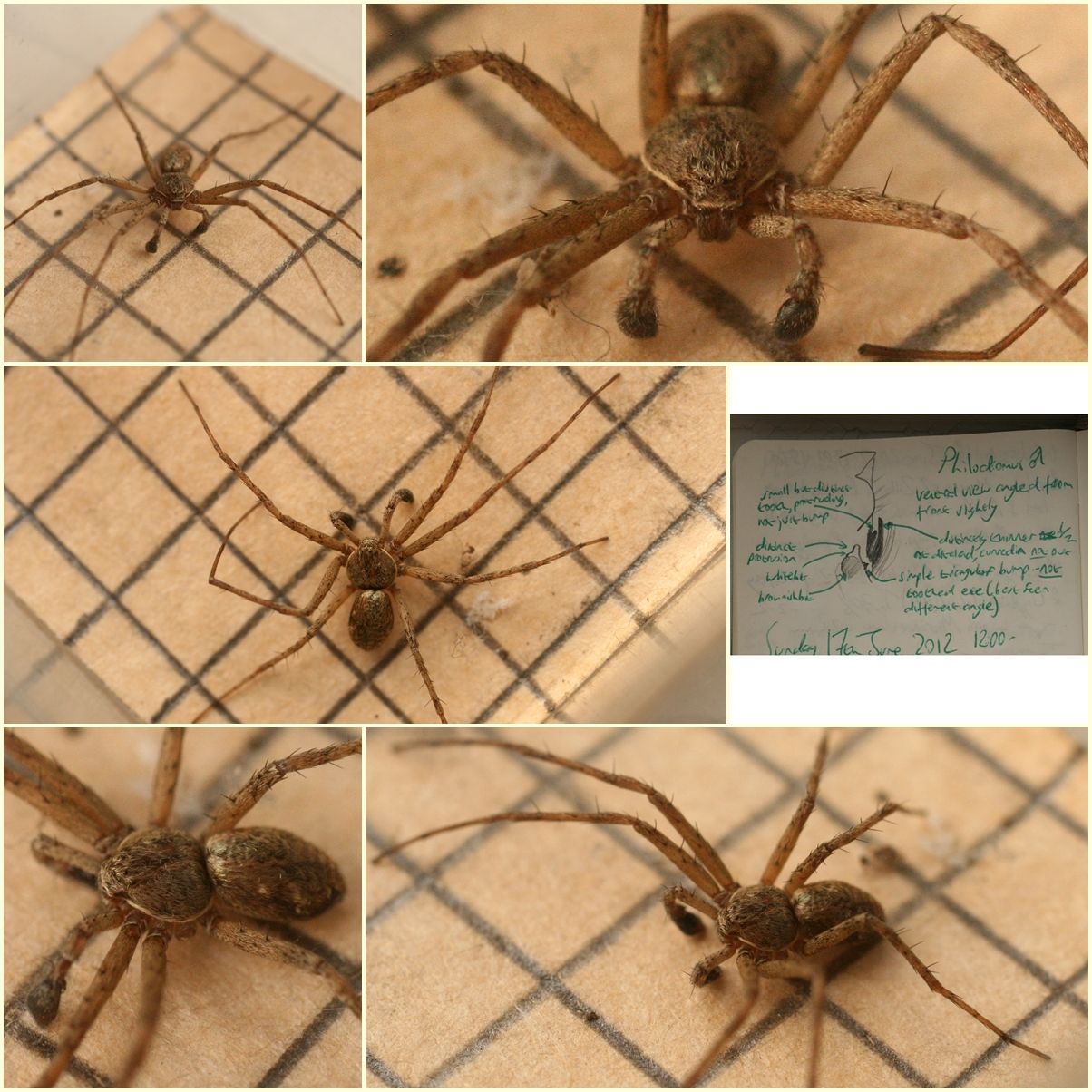
- Philodromus praedatus found resting on new fence at heath/wood edge. Bricket Wood Common, Hertfordshire, 17 June 2012.

Scientific classification
- Kingdom: Animalia
- Phylum: Arthropoda
- Subphylum: Chelicerata
- Class: Arachnida
- Order: Araneae
- Infraorder: Araneomorphae
- Family: Philodromidae
- Genus: Philodromus
- Species: P. praedatus

Binomial name
- Philodromus praedatus O. P.-Cambridge, 1871

= Philodromus praedatus =

Species of spider

Philodromus praedatus is a spider species found in Europe, Russia, Georgia, Azerbaijan, and Iran.
