= Philodromus pinetorum =

Scientific classification
- Kingdom: Animalia
- Phylum: Arthropoda
- Subphylum: Chelicerata
- Class: Arachnida
- Order: Araneae
- Infraorder: Araneomorphae
- Family: Philodromidae
- Genus: Philodromus
- Species: P. pinetorum

Binomial name
- Philodromus pinetorum Muster, 2009

Species of spider

Philodromus pinetorum is a spider species found from Portugal to Turkey.
