= Philodromus marmoratus =

Scientific classification
- Kingdom: Animalia
- Phylum: Arthropoda
- Subphylum: Chelicerata
- Class: Arachnida
- Order: Araneae
- Infraorder: Araneomorphae
- Family: Philodromidae
- Genus: Philodromus
- Species: P. marmoratus

Binomial name
- Philodromus marmoratus Kulczynski, 1891

Species of spider

Philodromus marmoratus is a spider species found from Austria and Czech Republic to Greece, Russia, Turkey, and Cyprus.
