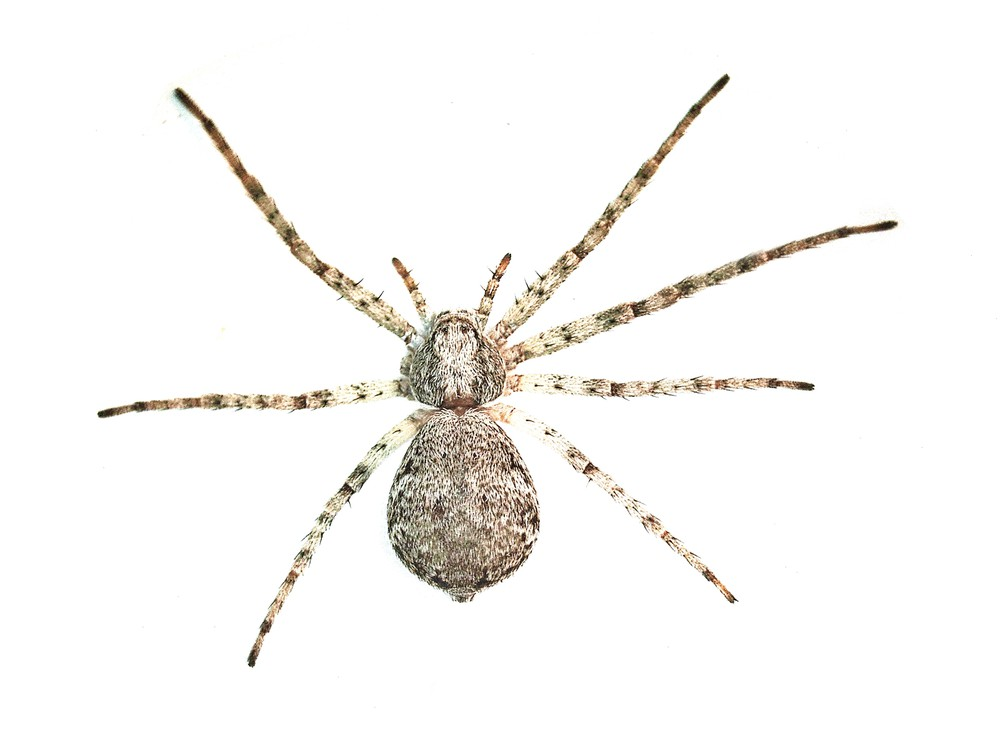

Scientific classification
- Kingdom: Animalia
- Phylum: Arthropoda
- Subphylum: Chelicerata
- Class: Arachnida
- Order: Araneae
- Infraorder: Araneomorphae
- Family: Philodromidae
- Genus: Philodromus
- Species: P. buxi

Binomial name
- Philodromus buxi Simon, 1884

= Philodromus buxi =

Species of spider

Philodromus buxi is a spider species found in Europe, Russia, Kazakhstan, and Iran.
