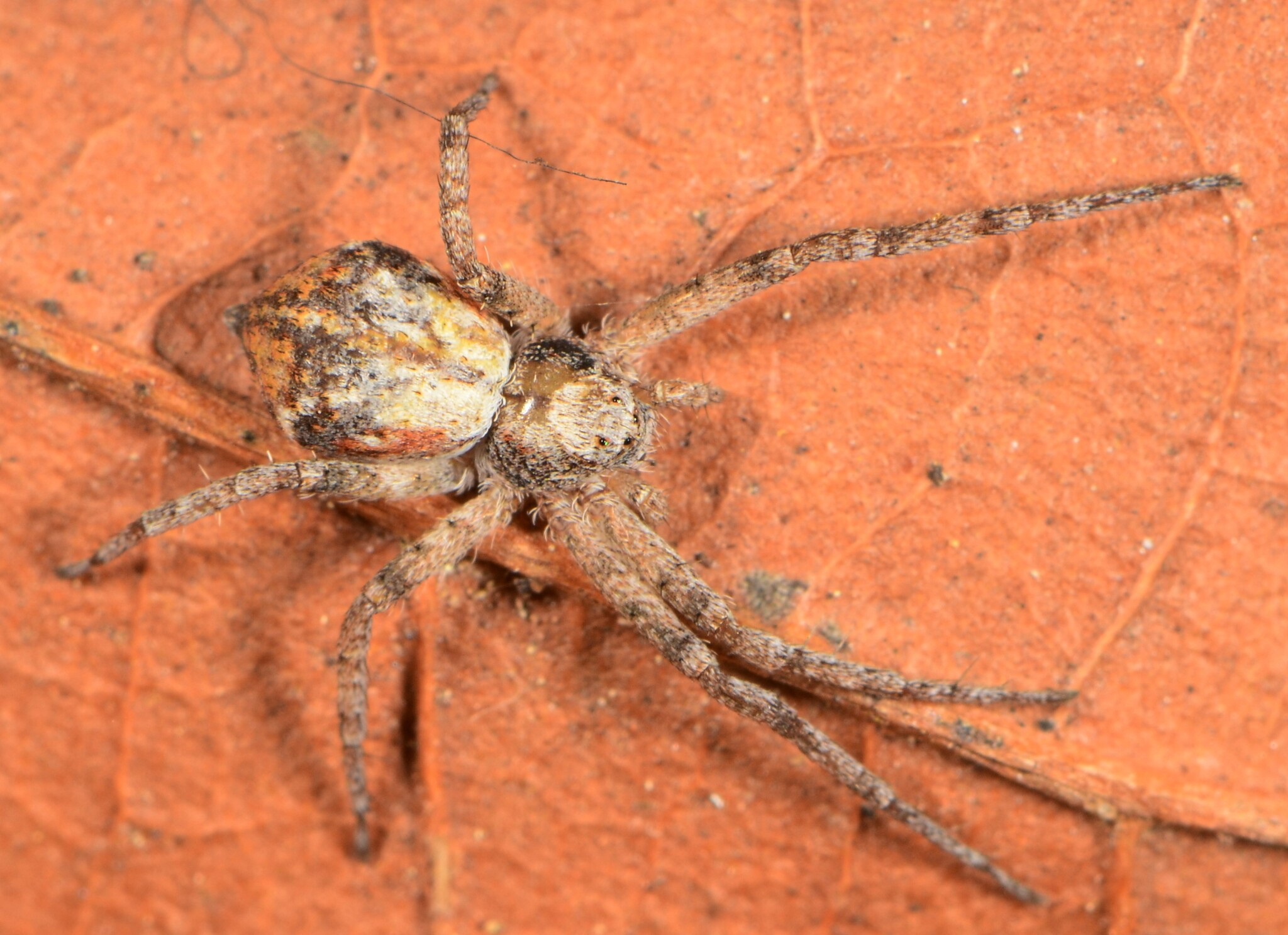
- female
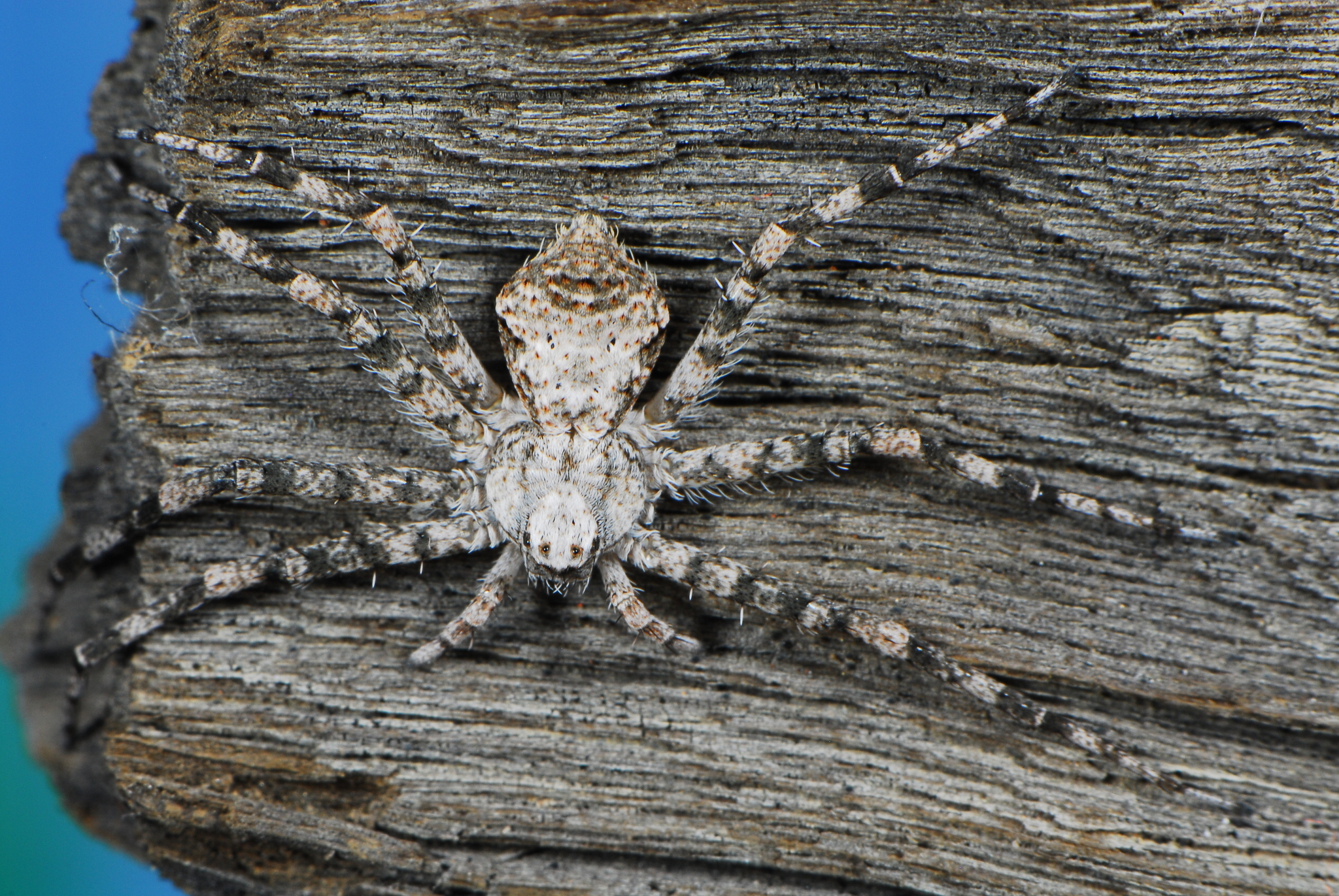
- female

Scientific classification
- Kingdom: Animalia
- Phylum: Arthropoda
- Subphylum: Chelicerata
- Class: Arachnida
- Order: Araneae
- Infraorder: Araneomorphae
- Family: Philodromidae
- Genus: Philodromus
- Species: P. guineensis

Binomial name
- Philodromus guineensis Millot, 1942

= Philodromus guineensis =

Guinea Running Spider

Species of spider

Philodromus guineensis is a species of spider in the family Philodromidae. It is commonly known as the Guinea running spider.

== Distribution ==
Philodromus guineensis is known from Guinea, Ivory Coast, and South Africa. In South Africa, it is recorded from six provinces including more than 10 protected areas, with an altitudinal range of 14-1816 m above sea level.

== Habitat and ecology ==
This species comprises free-living plant dwellers sampled from vegetation from the Fynbos, Grassland, Indian Ocean Coastal Belt and Savanna biomes, as well as from avocado and citrus orchards.

== Description ==
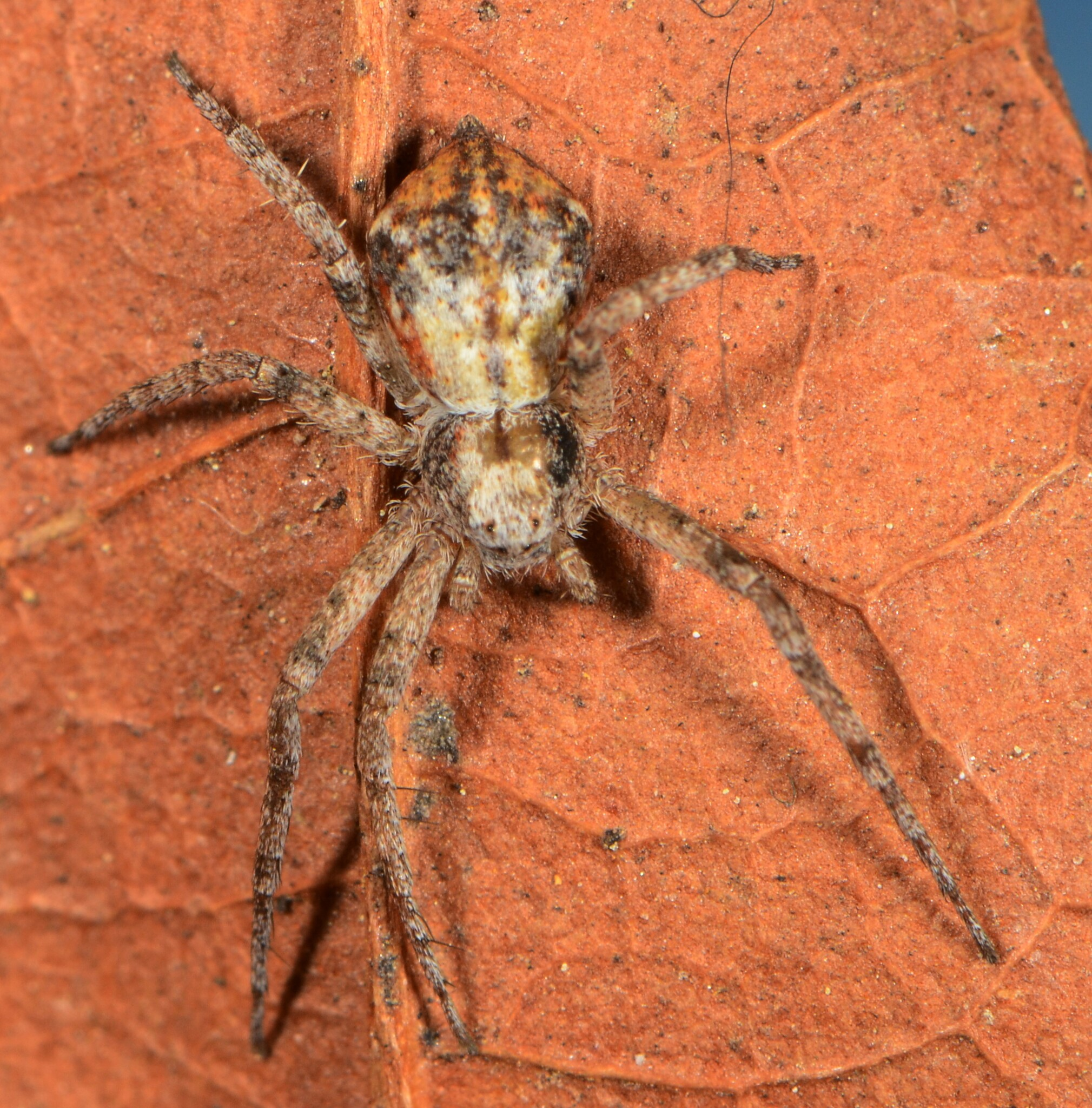
female

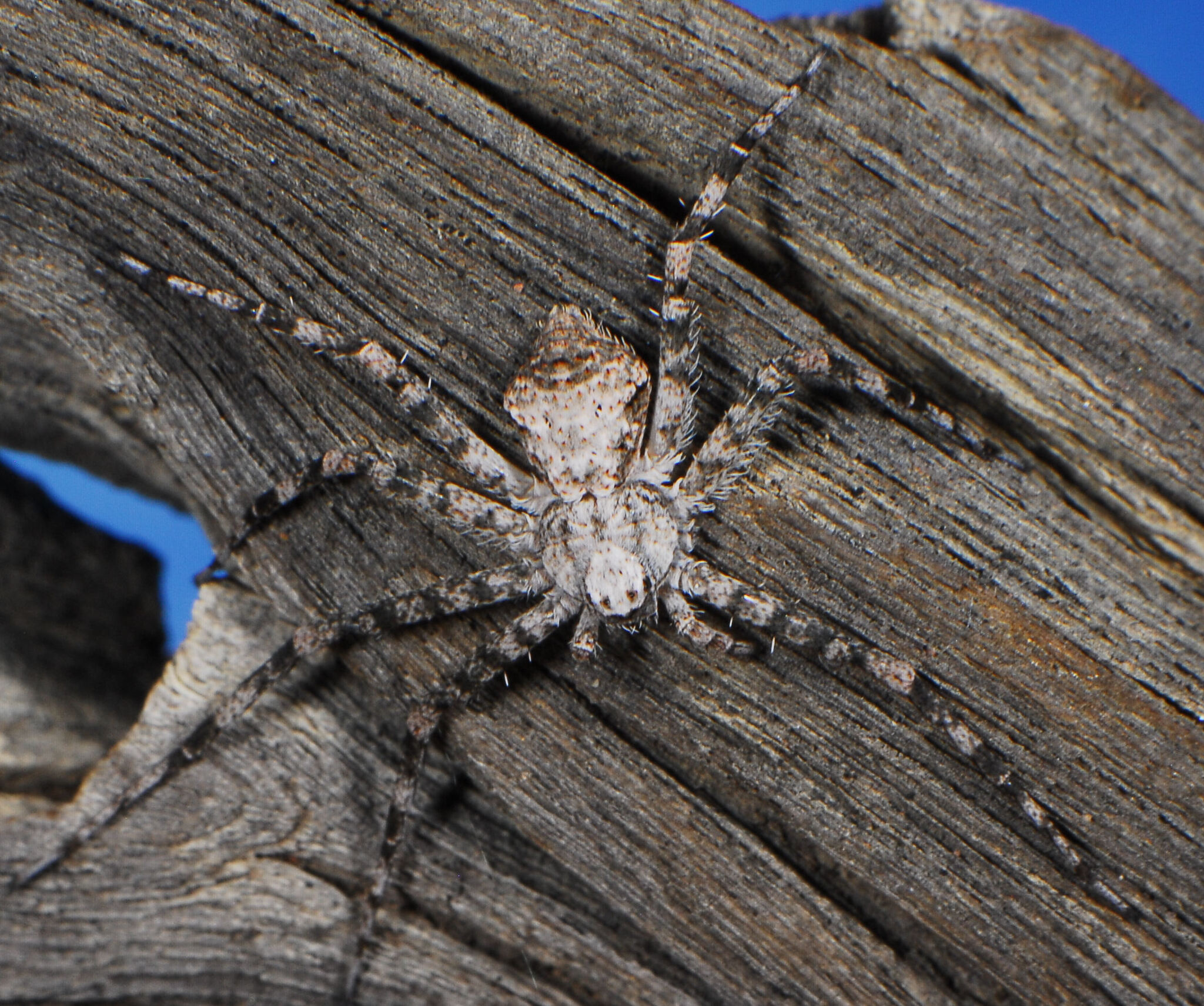
female

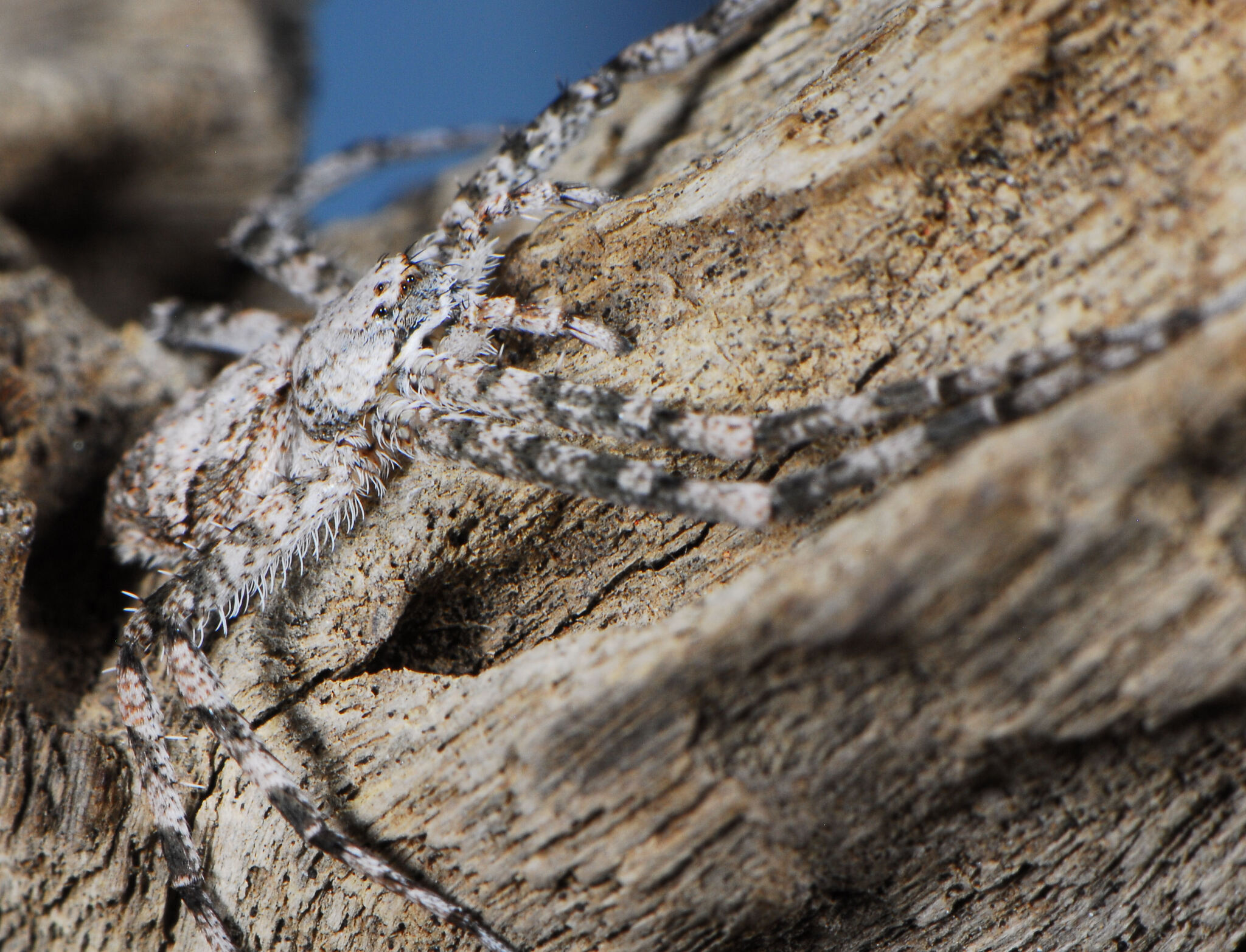
female

== Conservation ==
Philodromus guineensis is listed as Least Concern by the South African National Biodiversity Institute due to its wide African range. The species is protected in more than 10 protected areas such as Blouberg Nature Reserve and Nylsvley Nature Reserve.

== Etymology ==
This species is named after Guinea, from where it was first described.

== Taxonomy ==
The species was originally described by Millot (1942) from Guinea. The genus has not been revised and the species is known from both sexes.
