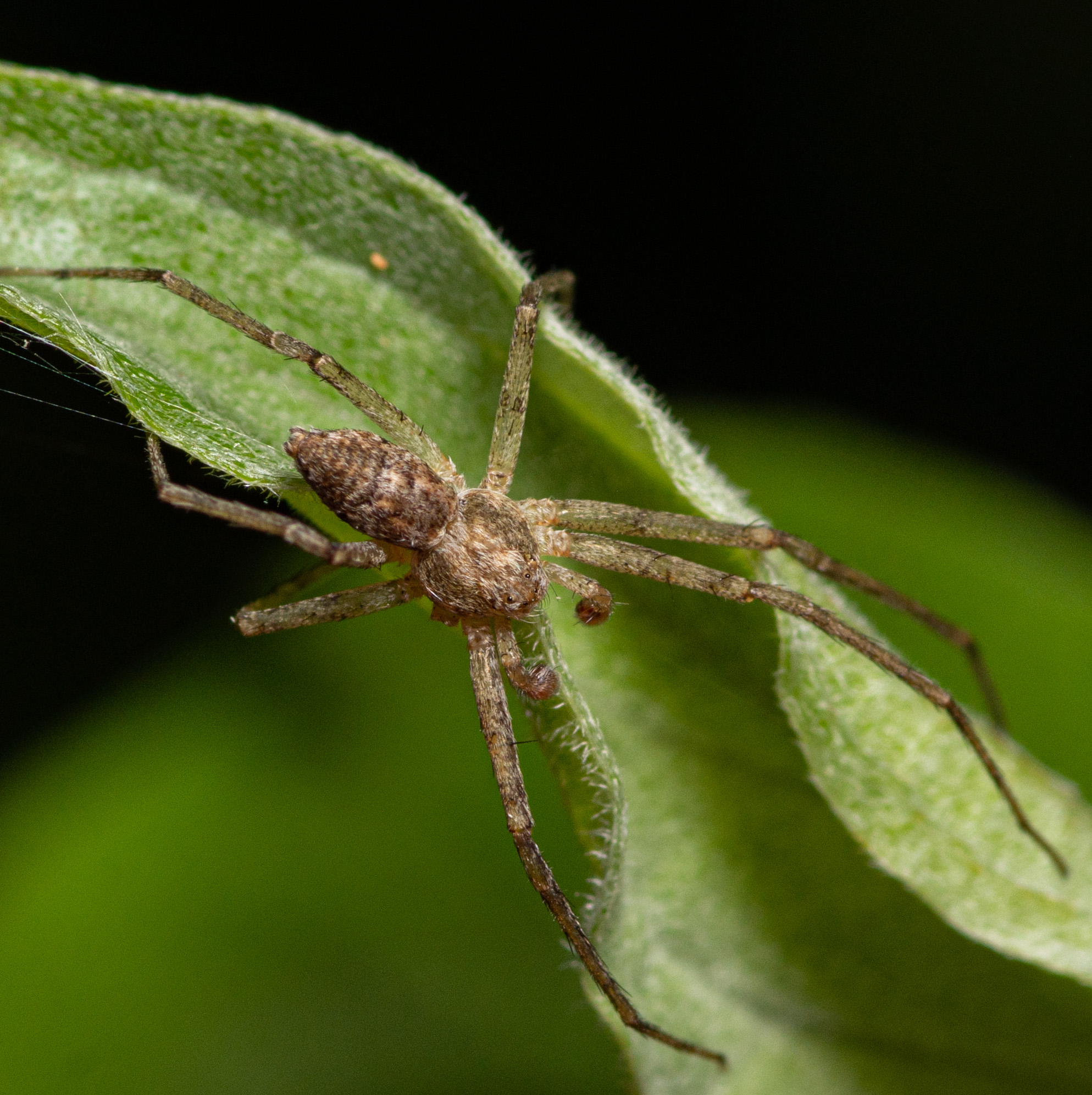
- Philodromus placidus male

Scientific classification
- Domain: Eukaryota
- Kingdom: Animalia
- Phylum: Arthropoda
- Subphylum: Chelicerata
- Class: Arachnida
- Order: Araneae
- Infraorder: Araneomorphae
- Family: Philodromidae
- Genus: Philodromus
- Species: P. placidus

Binomial name
- Philodromus placidus Banks, 1892

= Philodromus placidus =

Species of spider

Philodromus placidus is a species of running crab spider belonging to the family Philodromidae. It is commonly found across North America.
