= Philodromus californicus =

Scientific classification
- Domain: Eukaryota
- Kingdom: Animalia
- Phylum: Arthropoda
- Subphylum: Chelicerata
- Class: Arachnida
- Order: Araneae
- Infraorder: Araneomorphae
- Family: Philodromidae
- Genus: Philodromus
- Species: P. californicus

Binomial name
- Philodromus californicus Keyserling, 1884

Species of spider

Philodromus californicus is a species of running crab spider in the family Philodromidae. It is found in North America.
