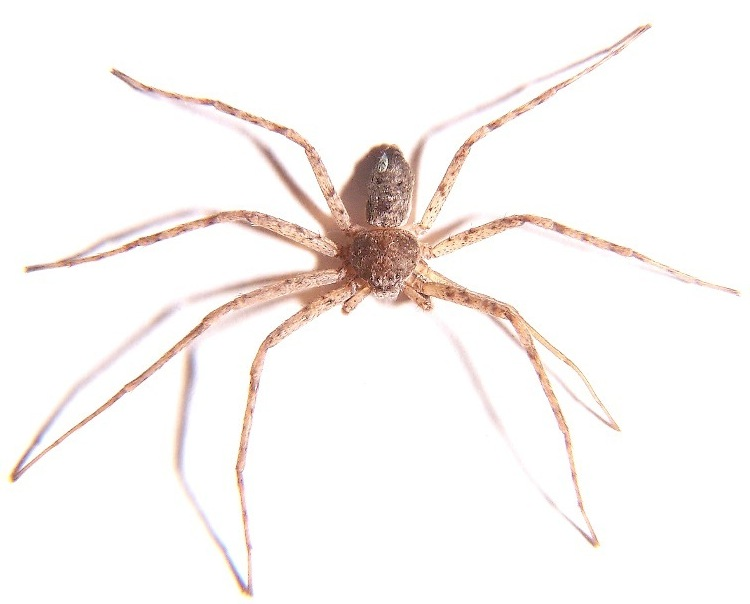

Scientific classification
- Domain: Eukaryota
- Kingdom: Animalia
- Phylum: Arthropoda
- Subphylum: Chelicerata
- Class: Arachnida
- Order: Araneae
- Infraorder: Araneomorphae
- Family: Philodromidae
- Genus: Philodromus
- Species: P. praelustris

Binomial name
- Philodromus praelustris Keyserling, 1880

= Philodromus praelustris =

Species of spider

Philodromus praelustris is a species of running crab spider in the family Philodromidae. It is found in the United States and Canada.
