= Philodromus thanatellus =

Scientific classification
- Kingdom: Animalia
- Phylum: Arthropoda
- Subphylum: Chelicerata
- Class: Arachnida
- Order: Araneae
- Infraorder: Araneomorphae
- Family: Philodromidae
- Genus: Philodromus
- Species: P. thanatellus

Binomial name
- Philodromus thanatellus Strand, 1909

Species of spider

Philodromus thanatellus is a species of spider in the family Philodromidae.

== Distribution ==
Philodromus thanatellus is endemic to South Africa. The species is known from juvenile specimens sampled prior to 1909 from the type locality Simon's Town in the Western Cape, at an altitude of 125 m above sea level.

== Habitat and ecology ==
This is a free-living plant dweller sampled from the Fynbos biome.

== Conservation ==
Philodromus thanatellus is listed as Data Deficient for Taxonomic reasons. The species is a Western Cape endemic known only from juvenile specimens from the type locality. The status of the species remains obscure and more sampling is needed to collect adult material and determine the species range.

== Taxonomy ==
The species was originally described by Embrik Strand in 1909 and is known only from juvenile specimens from Simon's Town. The genus has not been revised and the species was last sampled in 1909.
