= Philodromus epigynatus =

Scientific classification
- Kingdom: Animalia
- Phylum: Arthropoda
- Subphylum: Chelicerata
- Class: Arachnida
- Order: Araneae
- Infraorder: Araneomorphae
- Family: Philodromidae
- Genus: Philodromus
- Species: P. epigynatus

Binomial name
- Philodromus epigynatus Strand, 1909

Species of spider

Philodromus epigynatus is a species of spider in the family Philodromidae. It is commonly known as the Simonstown running spider.

== Distribution ==
Philodromus epigynatus is endemic to South Africa. The species is known only from the type locality Simon's Town in the Western Cape, at an altitude of 125 m above sea level.

== Habitat and ecology ==
These are free-living plant dwellers sampled from vegetation in the Fynbos biome.

== Conservation ==
Philodromus epigynatus is listed as Data Deficient for Taxonomic reasons. The species is a Western Cape endemic known only from the type locality. The type specimen was lost during the Second World War. Too little is known about the location, habitat and threats of this taxon for an assessment to be made.

== Taxonomy ==
The species was originally described by Strand (1909) and is known only from the type locality Simon's Town. The genus has not been revised and the species is known only from the female. The species was last sampled in 1909.
