= Philodromus quercicola =

Scientific classification
- Kingdom: Animalia
- Phylum: Arthropoda
- Subphylum: Chelicerata
- Class: Arachnida
- Order: Araneae
- Infraorder: Araneomorphae
- Family: Philodromidae
- Genus: Philodromus
- Species: P. quercicola

Binomial name
- Philodromus quercicola Schick, 1965

Species of spider

Philodromus quercicola is a species of running crab spider in the family Philodromidae. It is found in the United States.
