= Philodromus rufus vibrans =

Scientific classification
- Domain: Eukaryota
- Kingdom: Animalia
- Phylum: Arthropoda
- Subphylum: Chelicerata
- Class: Arachnida
- Order: Araneae
- Infraorder: Araneomorphae
- Family: Philodromidae
- Genus: Philodromus
- Species: P. rufus
- Subspecies: P. r. vibrans

Trinomial name
- Philodromus rufus vibrans Dondale, 1964

Subspecies of spider

Philodromus rufus vibrans is a subspecies of spider that ambushes its prey and lives in United States and Canada. It is commonly seen in forests, aspen parkland, wetland, riparian zones, and grassland.
