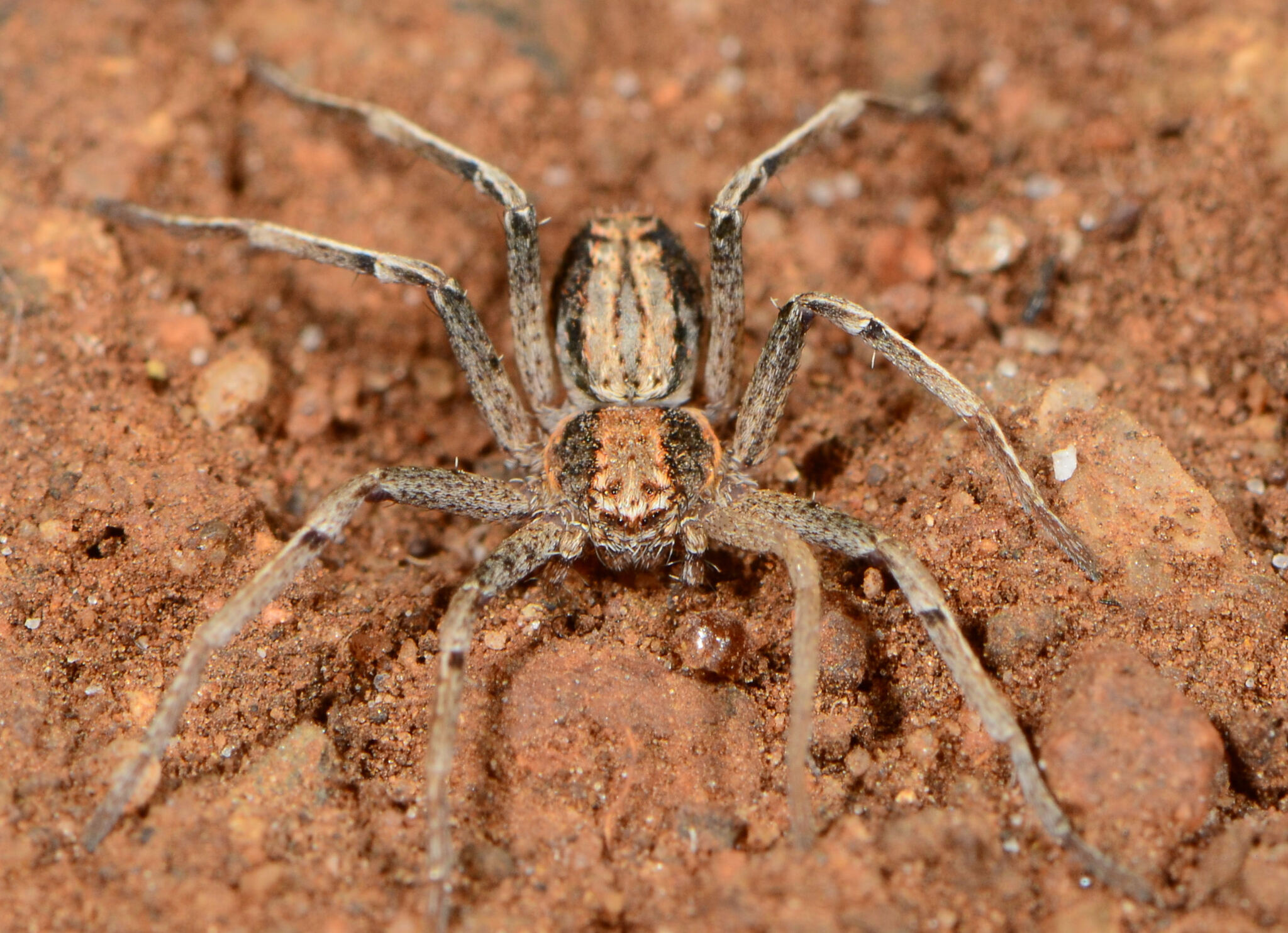
- female Philodromus grosi
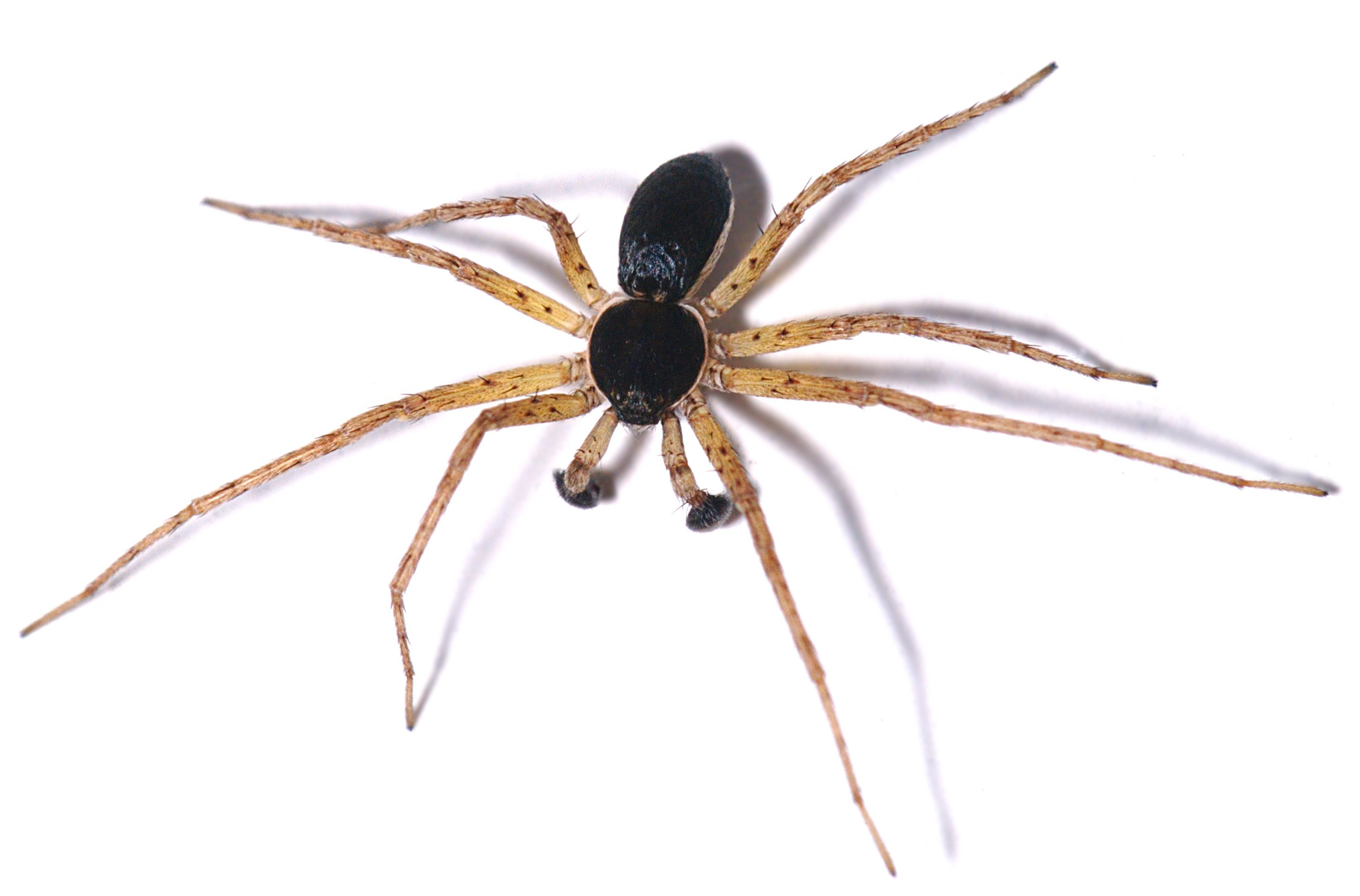
- Male Philodromus dispar

Scientific classification
- Kingdom: Animalia
- Phylum: Arthropoda
- Subphylum: Chelicerata
- Class: Arachnida
- Order: Araneae
- Infraorder: Araneomorphae
- Family: Philodromidae
- Genus: Philodromus; Walckenaer, 1826

Diversity
- c. 200 species

= Philodromus =

Genus of spiders

Philodromus is a genus of philodromid crab spiders. Spiders in this genus are distinctively flattened.

The more than 250 described species are distributed throughout the Holarctic region, with few species reaching into more southern regions. Some are found in certain parts of Africa, with sporadic species occurring up to Australia. Only one species (P. traviatus) is found in (northern) South America. Around sixteen species are described from Central Europe.

Philodromus margaritatus

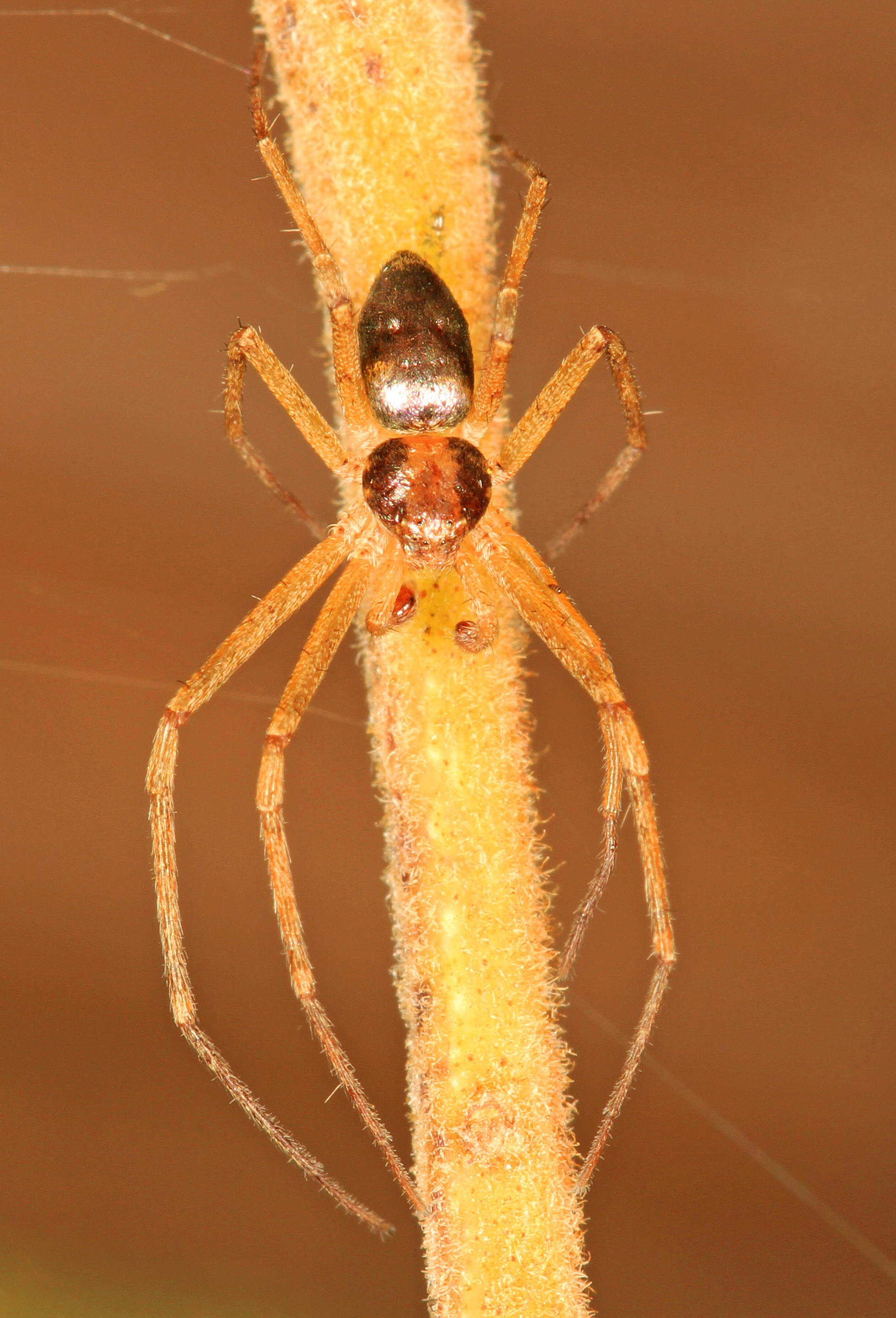
male P. marxi

== Species ==
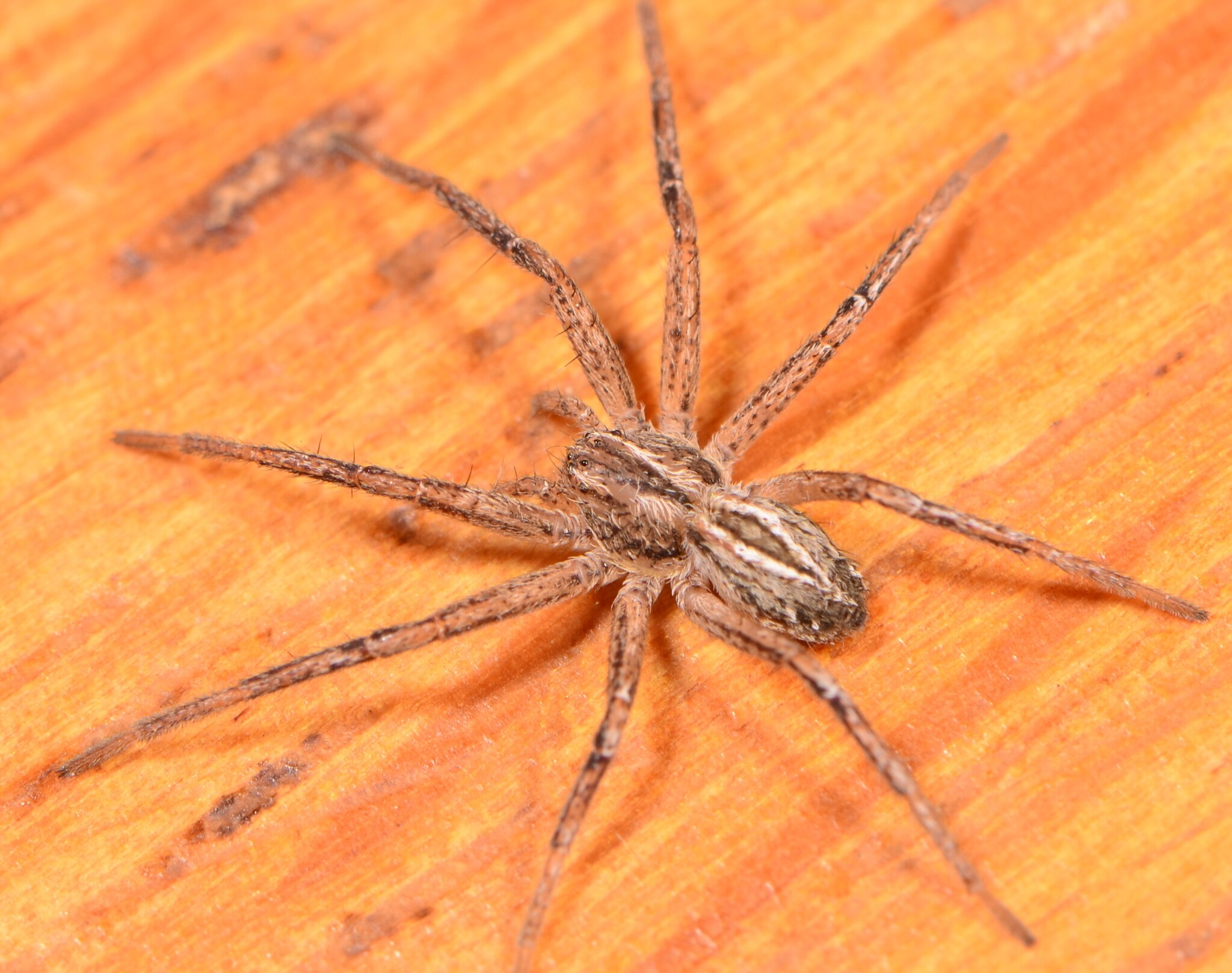
P. brachycephalus

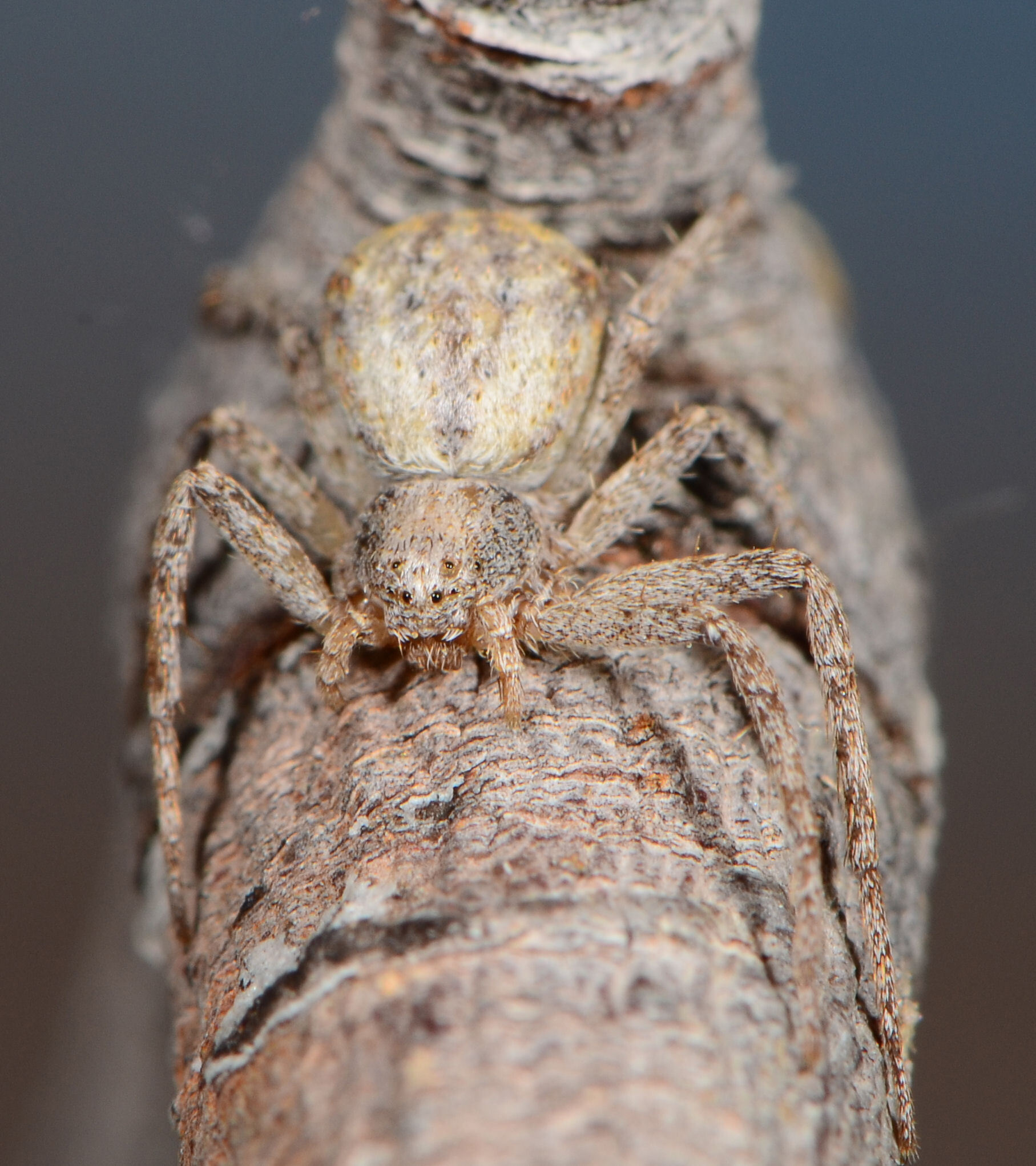
P. browningi

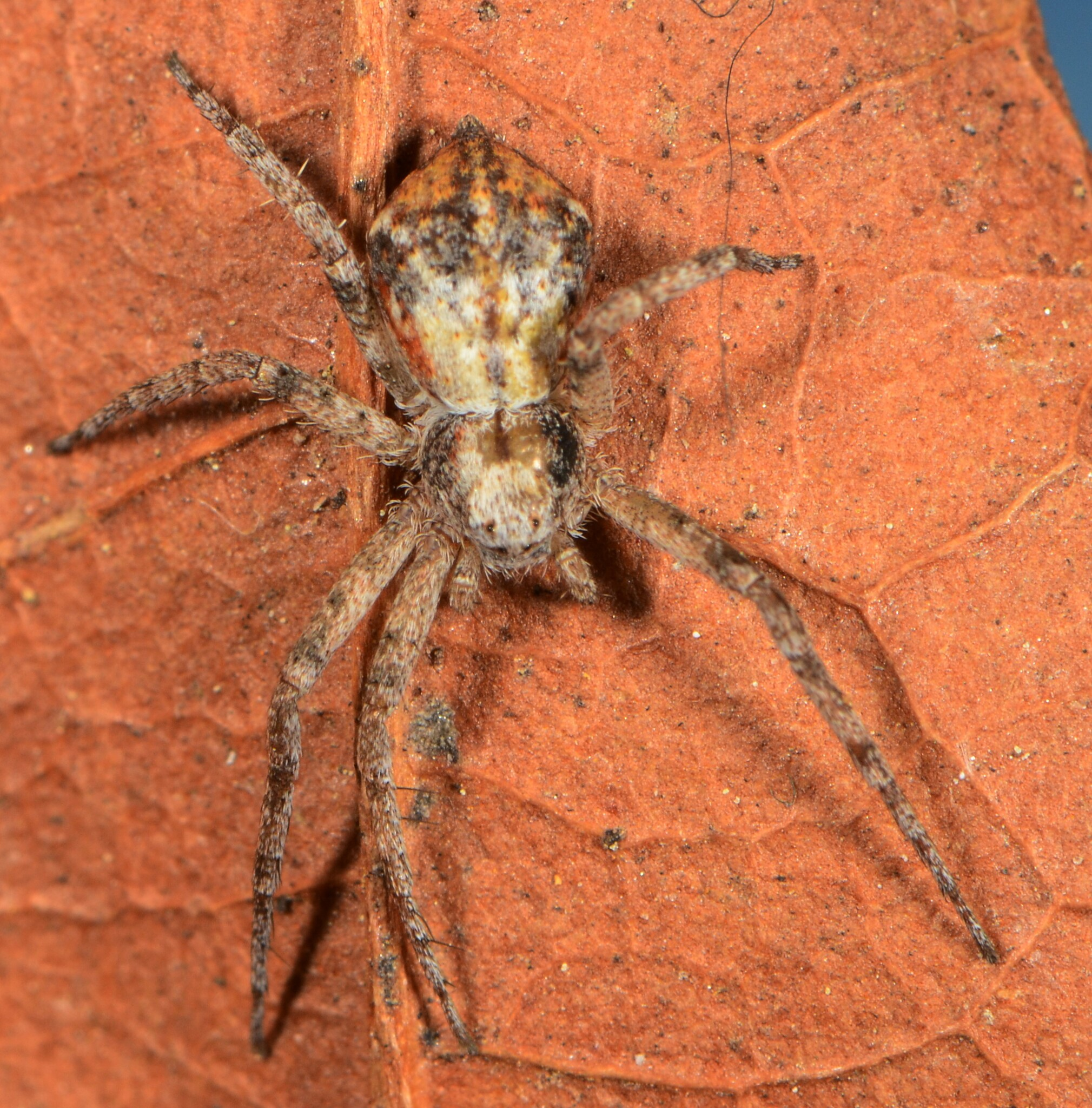
P. guineensis

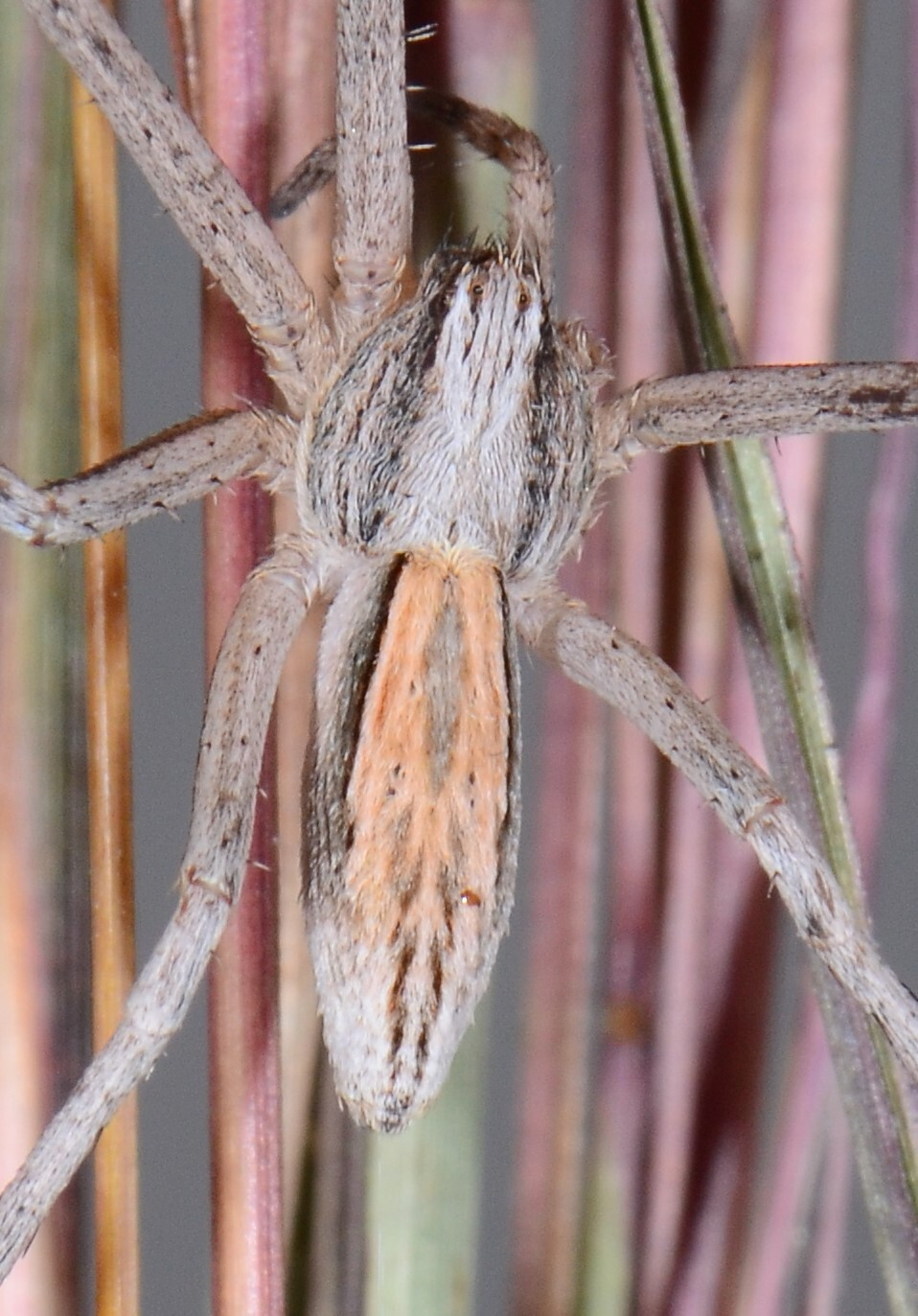
P. partitus

As of October 2025, this genus includes 205 species and six subspecies.

These species have articles on Wikipedia:

- Philodromus albidus Kulczyński, 1911 – Europe, Turkey, Caucasus
- Philodromus anomalus Gertsch, 1934 – United States
- Philodromus aureolus (Clerck, 1757) – Europe, Turkey, Caucasus, Russia (Europe to Central Asia and Middle Siberia), Kazakhstan, Iran, Central Asia, Mongolia, China, Korea, Japan (type species)
- Philodromus bigibba (O. Pickard-Cambridge, 1876) – Algeria, Libya, Egypt, Sudan, Yemen, Pakistan, India
  - P. b. australis Lawrence, 1928 – South Africa
- Philodromus blanckei (Wunderlich, 1995) – France (Corsica), Italy (Sardinia, mainland)
- Philodromus bosmansi Muster & Thaler, 2004 – Algeria
- Philodromus brachycephalus Lawrence, 1952 – Tanzania, South Africa
- Philodromus browningi Lawrence, 1952 – Zimbabwe, South Africa, Eswatini
- Philodromus buchari Kubcová, 2004 – Europe, Georgia
- Philodromus buxi Simon, 1884 – Europe, Russia (Europe to Far East), Kazakhstan, Iran
- Philodromus californicus Keyserling, 1884 – North America
- Philodromus cammarus Rossi, 1846 – Croatia
- Philodromus catagraphus Simon, 1870 – Spain
- Philodromus cespitum (Walckenaer, 1802) – North America, Europe, North Africa, Turkey, Caucasus, Russia (Europe to Far East), Kazakhstan, Iran, Mongolia, China, Korea, Japan
- Philodromus collinus C. L. Koch, 1835 – Europe, Turkey, Caucasus
- Philodromus dispar Walckenaer, 1826 – Europe, Turkey, Caucasus, Russia (Europe to South Siberia), Iran. Introduced to Canada, United States
- Philodromus epigynatus Strand, 1909 – South Africa
- Philodromus exilis Banks, 1892 – Canada, United States
- Philodromus femurostriatus Muster, 2009 – Greece, Turkey
- Philodromus floridensis Banks, 1904 – United States
- Philodromus grosi Lessert, 1943 – DR Congo, Namibia, Zimbabwe, South Africa
- Philodromus guineensis Millot, 1942 – Guinea, Ivory Coast, South Africa
- Philodromus imbecillus Keyserling, 1880 – Canada, United States
- Philodromus insperatus Schick, 1965 – Canada, United States
- Philodromus johani Muster, 2009 – Greece
- Philodromus josemitensis Gertsch, 1934 – Canada, United States
- Philodromus keyserlingi Marx, 1890 – Canada, United States
- Philodromus laricium Simon, 1875 – Spain, France, Italy, Switzerland, Germany, Austria, Slovenia
- Philodromus laticeps Keyserling, 1880 – United States
- Philodromus lividus Simon, 1875 – Morocco, Algeria, Portugal, Spain (Balearic Is.), France, Italy, Malta, Croatia, Albania, Greece
- Philodromus longipalpis Simon, 1870 – Switzerland, Hungary, southern Europe, Turkey, Ukraine, Russia (Europe), Georgia, Azerbaijan, Iraq, Iran
- Philodromus lunatus Muster & Thaler, 2004 – Croatia, Albania, Greece, Cyprus, Turkey
- Philodromus margaritatus (Clerck, 1757) – Europe, Turkey, Caucasus, Russia (Europe to Far East), Kazakhstan, Iran, Korea, Japan
- Philodromus marmoratus Kulczyński, 1891 – Austria and Czechia to Greece and Russia (Europe), Turkey, Cyprus
- Philodromus marxi Keyserling, 1884 – United States
- Philodromus mineri Gertsch, 1933 – Canada, United States
- Philodromus minutus Banks, 1892 – Canada, United States
- Philodromus monitae Muster & Van Keer, 2010 – Bulgaria, Greece
- Philodromus oneida Levi, 1951 – Canada, United States
- Philodromus parietalis Simon, 1875 – Spain, France
- Philodromus partitus Lessert, 1919 – Tanzania, Zimbabwe, South Africa
- Philodromus peninsulanus Gertsch, 1934 – Canada, United States
- Philodromus pinetorum Muster, 2009 – Portugal, Spain, France, Switzerland, Italy, Bulgaria, Greece, Turkey
- Philodromus placidus Banks, 1892 – North America
- Philodromus praedatus O. Pickard-Cambridge, 1871 – Europe, Russia (Europe to South Siberia), Georgia, Azerbaijan, Iran
- Philodromus praelustris Keyserling, 1880 – Canada, United States
- Philodromus quercicola Schick, 1965 – United States
- Philodromus rodecki Gertsch & Jellison, 1939 – Canada, United States
- Philodromus rufus Walckenaer, 1826 – North America, Europe, Turkey, Caucasus, Russia (Europe to Far East), Kazakhstan, Iran, Central Asia, Mongolia, China, Korea, Japan
  - P. r. pacificus Banks, 1898 – Canada, United States
  - P. r. vibrans Dondale, 1964 – Canada, United States
- Philodromus speciosus Gertsch, 1934 – Canada, United States
- Philodromus spectabilis Keyserling, 1880 – Canada, United States
- Philodromus thanatellus Strand, 1909 – South Africa
- Philodromus vulgaris (Hentz, 1847) – Canada, United States
- Philodromus vulpio Simon, 1910 – South Africa

Complete species list as of October 2025
- Philodromus albicans O. Pickard-Cambridge, 1897 – Mexico
- Philodromus albidus Kulczyński, 1911 – Europe, Turkey, Caucasus
- Philodromus albofrenatus Simon, 1907 – Equatorial Guinea (Bioko)
- Philodromus albolimbatus Thorell, 1895 – Myanmar
- Philodromus alboniger Caporiacco, 1949 – Kenya
- Philodromus aliensis Hu, 2001 – China
- Philodromus anomalus Gertsch, 1934 – United States
- Philodromus archettii Caporiacco, 1941 – Ethiopia
- Philodromus arizonensis Dondale & Redner, 1969 – United States, Mexico
- Philodromus aryy Marusik, 1991 – Russia (Urals to Far East), China
- Philodromus ashae Gajbe & Gajbe, 1999 – India
- Philodromus assamensis Tikader, 1962 – India, China
- Philodromus aureolus (Clerck, 1757) – Europe, Turkey, Caucasus, Russia (Europe to Central Asia and Middle Siberia), Kazakhstan, Iran, Central Asia, Mongolia, China, Korea, Japan (type species)
- Philodromus auricomus L. Koch, 1878 – Russia (Far East), China, Korea, Japan
- Philodromus austerus (L. Koch, 1876) – Australia (Queensland)
- Philodromus azcursor Logunov & Huseynov, 2008 – Azerbaijan
- Philodromus barmani Tikader, 1980 – India
- Philodromus barrowsi Gertsch, 1934 – United States
- Philodromus betrabatai Tikader, 1966 – India
- Philodromus bhagirathai Tikader, 1966 – India
- Philodromus bicornutus Schmidt & Krause, 1995 – Cape Verde
- Philodromus bigibba (O. Pickard-Cambridge, 1876) – Algeria, Libya, Egypt, Sudan, Yemen, Pakistan, India
  - P. b. australis Lawrence, 1928 – South Africa
- Philodromus bigibbosus Caporiacco, 1941 – Ethiopia
- Philodromus bilineatus Bryant, 1933 – United States
- Philodromus bimuricatus Dondale & Redner, 1968 – United States
- Philodromus blanckei (Wunderlich, 1995) – France (Corsica), Italy (Sardinia, mainland)
- Philodromus bonneti Karol, 1968 – Turkey
- Philodromus borana Caporiacco, 1939 – Ethiopia
- Philodromus bosmansi Muster & Thaler, 2004 – Algeria
- Philodromus brachycephalus Lawrence, 1952 – Tanzania, South Africa
- Philodromus breviductus Dondale & Redner, 1969 – Jamaica
- Philodromus browningi Lawrence, 1952 – Zimbabwe, South Africa, Eswatini
- Philodromus bucaensis (Logunov & Kunt, 2010) – Turkey
- Philodromus buchari Kubcová, 2004 – Europe, Georgia
- Philodromus buxi Simon, 1884 – Europe, Russia (Europe to Far East), Kazakhstan, Iran
- Philodromus calidus Lucas, 1846 – Morocco, Algeria, Libya
- Philodromus californicus Keyserling, 1884 – North America
- Philodromus cammarus Rossi, 1846 – Croatia
- Philodromus caporiaccoi Roewer, 1951 – Kenya
- Philodromus casseli Simon, 1900 – Mali
- Philodromus catagraphus Simon, 1870 – Spain
- Philodromus cavatus Dondale & Redner, 1969 – Mexico
- Philodromus cayanus Taczanowski, 1872 – French Guiana
- Philodromus cespitum (Walckenaer, 1802) – North America, Europe, North Africa, Turkey, Caucasus, Russia (Europe to Far East), Kazakhstan, Iran, Mongolia, China, Korea, Japan
- Philodromus chambaensis Tikader, 1980 – India, China
- Philodromus chamisis Schick, 1965 – United States, Mexico
- Philodromus cinereus O. Pickard-Cambridge, 1876 – Egypt
- Philodromus coachellae Schick, 1965 – United States, Mexico
- Philodromus collinus C. L. Koch, 1835 – Europe, Turkey, Caucasus
- Philodromus corradii Caporiacco, 1941 – Ethiopia
- Philodromus cubanus Dondale & Redner, 1968 – Cuba
- Philodromus cufrae Caporiacco, 1936 – Libya
- Philodromus daoxianen Yin, Peng & Kim, 1999 – China
- Philodromus decoratus Tikader, 1962 – India
- Philodromus denisi Levy, 1977 – Libya, Egypt
- Philodromus devhutai Tikader, 1966 – India
- Philodromus diablae Schick, 1965 – United States
- Philodromus digitatus Yang, Zhu & Song, 2005 – China
- Philodromus dilatatus Caporiacco, 1940 – Ethiopia
- Philodromus dilutus Thorell, 1875 – Ukraine, Russia (Europe)
- Philodromus dispar Walckenaer, 1826 – Europe, Turkey, Caucasus, Russia (Europe to South Siberia), Iran. Introduced to Canada, United States
- Philodromus distans Dondale & Redner, 1968 – United States
- Philodromus domesticus Tikader, 1962 – India
- Philodromus droseroides Schick, 1965 – United States
- Philodromus dubius Caporiacco, 1933 – Libya
- Philodromus durvei Tikader, 1980 – India
- Philodromus epigynatus Strand, 1909 – South Africa
- Philodromus erythrops Caporiacco, 1933 – Libya
- Philodromus exilis Banks, 1892 – Canada, United States
- Philodromus femurostriatus Muster, 2009 – Greece, Turkey
- Philodromus floridensis Banks, 1904 – United States
- Philodromus foucauldi Denis, 1954 – Algeria
- Philodromus frontosus Simon, 1897 – India
- Philodromus fuscolimbatus Lucas, 1846 – Mediterranean, Switzerland, Slovakia, Romania, Moldova, Turkey, Georgia
- Philodromus fuscomarginatus (De Geer, 1778) – Europe, Russia (Europe to Far East)
- Philodromus gertschi Schick, 1965 – United States
- Philodromus grazianii Caporiacco, 1933 – Libya
- Philodromus grosi Lessert, 1943 – DR Congo, Namibia, Zimbabwe, South Africa
- Philodromus guineensis Millot, 1942 – Guinea, Ivory Coast, South Africa
- Philodromus guiyang Long & Yu, 2022 – China
- Philodromus gyirongensis Hu, 2001 – China
- Philodromus hadzii Šilhavý, 1944 – North Macedonia
- Philodromus harrietae Dondale & Redner, 1969 – United States
- Philodromus hiulcus (Pavesi, 1883) – Ethiopia, Somalia
- Philodromus humilis Kroneberg, 1875 – Tajikistan
- Philodromus imbecillus Keyserling, 1880 – Canada, United States
- Philodromus immaculatus Denis, 1955 – Niger
- Philodromus infectus Dondale & Redner, 1969 – Mexico
- Philodromus infuscatus Keyserling, 1880 – Canada, United States
  - P. i. utus Chamberlin, 1921 – United States
- Philodromus insperatus Schick, 1965 – Canada, United States
- Philodromus insulanus Kulczyński, 1905 – Madeira
- Philodromus jabalpurensis Gajbe & Gajbe, 1999 – India
- Philodromus jimredneri Jiménez, 1989 – Mexico
- Philodromus johani Muster, 2009 – Greece
- Philodromus josemitensis Gertsch, 1934 – Canada, United States
- Philodromus juvencus Kulczyński, 1895 – Armenia
- Philodromus kalliaensis Levy, 1977 – Israel
- Philodromus ketani Gajbe, 2005 – India
- Philodromus keyserlingi Marx, 1890 – Canada, United States
- Philodromus kraepelini Simon, 1905 – Indonesia (Java)
- Philodromus krausi Muster & Thaler, 2004 – Albania, Greece, Turkey
- Philodromus laricium Simon, 1875 – Spain, France, Italy, Switzerland, Germany, Austria, Slovenia
- Philodromus lasaensis Yin, Peng, Bao & Kim, 2000 – China
- Philodromus laticeps Keyserling, 1880 – United States
- Philodromus legae Caporiacco, 1941 – Ethiopia
- Philodromus lhasana Hu, 2001 – China
- Philodromus lividus Simon, 1875 – Morocco, Algeria, Portugal, Spain (Balearic Is.), France, Italy, Malta, Croatia, Albania, Greece
- Philodromus longiductus Dondale & Redner, 1969 – Costa Rica
- Philodromus longipalpis Simon, 1870 – Switzerland, Hungary, southern Europe, Turkey, Ukraine, Russia (Europe), Georgia, Azerbaijan, Iraq, Iran
- Philodromus lugens (O. Pickard-Cambridge, 1876) – Egypt
- Philodromus lunatus Muster & Thaler, 2004 – Croatia, Albania, Greece, Cyprus, Turkey
- Philodromus luteovirescens Urquhart, 1893 – Australia (Tasmania)
- Philodromus lutulentus Gertsch, 1934 – United States
- Philodromus maculatovittatus Strand, 1906 – Ethiopia
- Philodromus maestrii Caporiacco, 1941 – Ethiopia
- Philodromus maghrebi Muster, 2009 – Algeria
- Philodromus maliniae Tikader, 1966 – India
- Philodromus manikae Tikader, 1971 – India
- Philodromus margaritatus (Clerck, 1757) – Europe, Turkey, Caucasus, Russia (Europe to Far East), Kazakhstan, Iran, Korea, Japan
- Philodromus marginellus Banks, 1901 – United States, Mexico
- Philodromus marmoratus Kulczyński, 1891 – Austria and Czechia to Greece and Russia (Europe), Turkey, Cyprus
- Philodromus marusiki (Logunov, 1997) – Russia (West and South Siberia), Mongolia
- Philodromus marxi Keyserling, 1884 – United States
- Philodromus mediocris Gertsch, 1934 – United States
- Philodromus melanostomus Thorell, 1895 – Myanmar
- Philodromus mexicanus Dondale & Redner, 1969 – Mexico
- Philodromus mineri Gertsch, 1933 – Canada, United States
- Philodromus minutus Banks, 1892 – Canada, United States
- Philodromus mississippianus Dondale & Redner, 1969 – United States
- Philodromus mohiniae Tikader, 1966 – India
- Philodromus molarius L. Koch, 1879 – Kazakhstan
- Philodromus monitae Muster & Van Keer, 2010 – Bulgaria, Greece
- Philodromus montanus Bryant, 1933 – United States
- Philodromus morsus Karsch, 1884 – West Africa
- Philodromus multispinus Caporiacco, 1933 – Libya
- Philodromus musteri Lecigne & Oger, 2020 – Turkey
- Philodromus nigrostriatipes Bösenberg & Strand, 1906 – Japan
- Philodromus niveus Vinson, 1863 – Madagascar
- Philodromus oneida Levi, 1951 – Canada, United States
- Philodromus orarius Schick, 1965 – United States, Mexico
- Philodromus otjimbumbe Lawrence, 1927 – Namibia, South Africa
- Philodromus paiki Jang, Lee, Yoo & Kim, 2024 – China, Korea
- Philodromus pali Gajbe & Gajbe, 2001 – India
- Philodromus panganii Caporiacco, 1947 – East Africa
- Philodromus parietalis Simon, 1875 – Spain, France
- Philodromus partitus Lessert, 1919 – Tanzania, Zimbabwe, South Africa
- Philodromus parvulus Zamani & Marusik, 2025 – Iran
- Philodromus pawani Gajbe, 2005 – India
- Philodromus pelagonus Šilhavý, 1944 – North Macedonia
- Philodromus peninsulanus Gertsch, 1934 – Canada, United States
- Philodromus pentheri Muster, 2009 – Albania, Azerbaijan
- Philodromus pericu Jiménez, 1989 – Mexico
- Philodromus pernix Blackwall, 1846 – Canada, United States
- Philodromus pesbovis Caporiacco, 1949 – Kenya
- Philodromus pinetorum Muster, 2009 – Portugal, Spain, France, Switzerland, Italy, Bulgaria, Greece, Turkey
- Philodromus pinyonelis Schick, 1965 – United States
- Philodromus placidus Banks, 1892 – North America
- Philodromus planus (L. Koch, 1875) – New Guinea, Australia (Queensland)
- Philodromus poecilus (Thorell, 1872) – Europe, Turkey, Caucasus, Russia (Europe to Far East), Central Asia
- Philodromus populicola Denis, 1958 – Afghanistan
- Philodromus praedatus O. Pickard-Cambridge, 1871 – Europe, Russia (Europe to South Siberia), Georgia, Azerbaijan, Iran
- Philodromus praelustris Keyserling, 1880 – Canada, United States
- Philodromus pratariae (Scheffer, 1904) – United States, Mexico
- Philodromus pratarioides Dondale & Redner, 1969 – Mexico
- Philodromus probolus Dondale & Redner, 1969 – United States, Mexico
- Philodromus psaronius Dondale & Redner, 1968 – Mexico
- Philodromus pseudanomalus Dondale & Redner, 1969 – Mexico
- Philodromus punctatissimus Roewer, 1962 – Afghanistan
- Philodromus punctisternus Caporiacco, 1940 – Ethiopia
- Philodromus pygmaeus Levy, 1977 – Israel
- Philodromus quercicola Schick, 1965 – United States
- Philodromus rajani Gajbe, 2005 – India
- Philodromus renarius Urita & Song, 1987 – China
- Philodromus rodecki Gertsch & Jellison, 1939 – Canada, United States
- Philodromus roseus Kishida, 1914 – Japan
- Philodromus rufus Walckenaer, 1826 – North America, Europe, Turkey, Caucasus, Russia (Europe to Far East), Kazakhstan, Iran, Central Asia, Mongolia, China, Korea, Japan
  - P. r. jenningsi Cutler, 2003 – United States
  - P. r. pacificus Banks, 1898 – Canada, United States
  - P. r. quartus Dondale & Redner, 1968 – North America
  - P. r. vibrans Dondale, 1964 – Canada, United States
- Philodromus sanjeevi Gajbe, 2004 – India
- Philodromus satullus Keyserling, 1880 – USA to Costa Rica
- Philodromus schicki Dondale & Redner, 1968 – United States
- Philodromus separatus Dondale & Redner, 1969 – Mexico
- Philodromus shaochui Yin, Peng, Bao & Kim, 2000 – China
- Philodromus shillongensis Tikader, 1962 – India
- Philodromus silvestrii Caporiacco, 1940 – Somalia
- Philodromus simillimus Denis, 1962 – Madeira
- Philodromus speciosus Gertsch, 1934 – Canada, United States
- Philodromus spectabilis Keyserling, 1880 – Canada, United States
- Philodromus spinitarsis Simon, 1895 – Russia (South Siberia, Far East), China, Korea, Japan
- Philodromus splendens Indzhov, 2020 – Bulgaria, Ukraine
- Philodromus sticticus Lucas, 1858 – Gabon
- Philodromus subaureolus Bösenberg & Strand, 1906 – Mongolia, China, Korea, Japan
- Philodromus tabupumensis Petrunkevitch, 1914 – Myanmar
- Philodromus thanatellus Strand, 1909 – South Africa
- Philodromus tortus Dondale & Redner, 1969 – United States
- Philodromus traviatus Banks, 1929 – Panama, Aruba, Curaçao, Bonaire, Venezuela
- Philodromus undarum Barnes, 1953 – United States
- Philodromus utotchkini Marusik, 1991 – Russia (South Siberia, Far East)
- Philodromus v-notatus Caporiacco, 1947 – Ethiopia
- Philodromus vagulus Simon, 1875 – Europe
- Philodromus validus (Gertsch, 1933) – Canada, United States
- Philodromus venustus O. Pickard-Cambridge, 1876 – Libya, Egypt
- Philodromus verityi Schick, 1965 – United States
- Philodromus victor Lessert, 1943 – Congo
- Philodromus vinokurovi Marusik, 1991 – Russia (Urals to South Siberia), China
- Philodromus vulgaris (Hentz, 1847) – Canada, United States
- Philodromus vulpio Simon, 1910 – South Africa
- Philodromus uljin Jang, Lee, & Kim, 2026 - South Korea

=== Dubious names ===
Nomina dubia (dubious names) include:

- Philodromus depriesteri (Braun, 1965)
- Philodromus micans (Menge, 1875)
