= Philodromus laticeps =

Scientific classification
- Kingdom: Animalia
- Phylum: Arthropoda
- Subphylum: Chelicerata
- Class: Arachnida
- Order: Araneae
- Infraorder: Araneomorphae
- Family: Philodromidae
- Genus: Philodromus
- Species: P. laticeps

Binomial name
- Philodromus laticeps Keyserling, 1880

Species of spider

Philodromus laticeps is a species of running crab spider belonging to the family Philodromidae. It is found in the United States.
