= Philodromus bosmansi =

Scientific classification
- Kingdom: Animalia
- Phylum: Arthropoda
- Subphylum: Chelicerata
- Class: Arachnida
- Order: Araneae
- Infraorder: Araneomorphae
- Family: Philodromidae
- Genus: Philodromus
- Species: P. bosmansi

Binomial name
- Philodromus bosmansi Muster & Thaler, 2004

Species of spider

Philodromus bosmansi is a spider species found in Algeria and Sardinia.
