= Philodromus johani =

Scientific classification
- Kingdom: Animalia
- Phylum: Arthropoda
- Subphylum: Chelicerata
- Class: Arachnida
- Order: Araneae
- Infraorder: Araneomorphae
- Family: Philodromidae
- Genus: Philodromus
- Species: P. johani

Binomial name
- Philodromus johani Muster, 2009

Species of spider

Philodromus johani is a spider species found in Greece.
