= Philodromus femurostriatus =

Scientific classification
- Kingdom: Animalia
- Phylum: Arthropoda
- Subphylum: Chelicerata
- Class: Arachnida
- Order: Araneae
- Infraorder: Araneomorphae
- Family: Philodromidae
- Genus: Philodromus
- Species: P. femurostriatus

Binomial name
- Philodromus femurostriatus Muster, 2009

Species of spider

Philodromus femurostriatus is a spider species found in Greece and Turkey.
