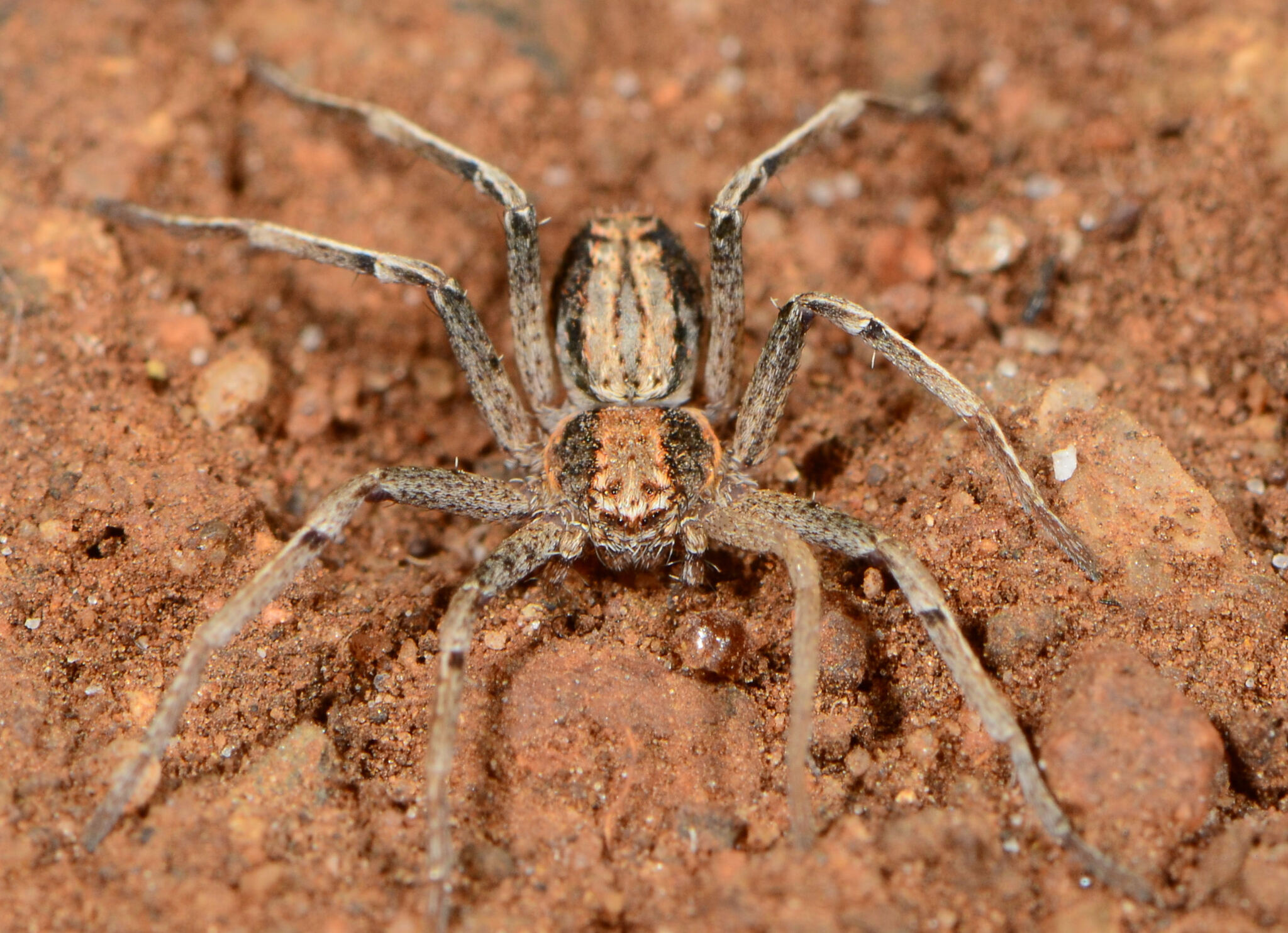
- female
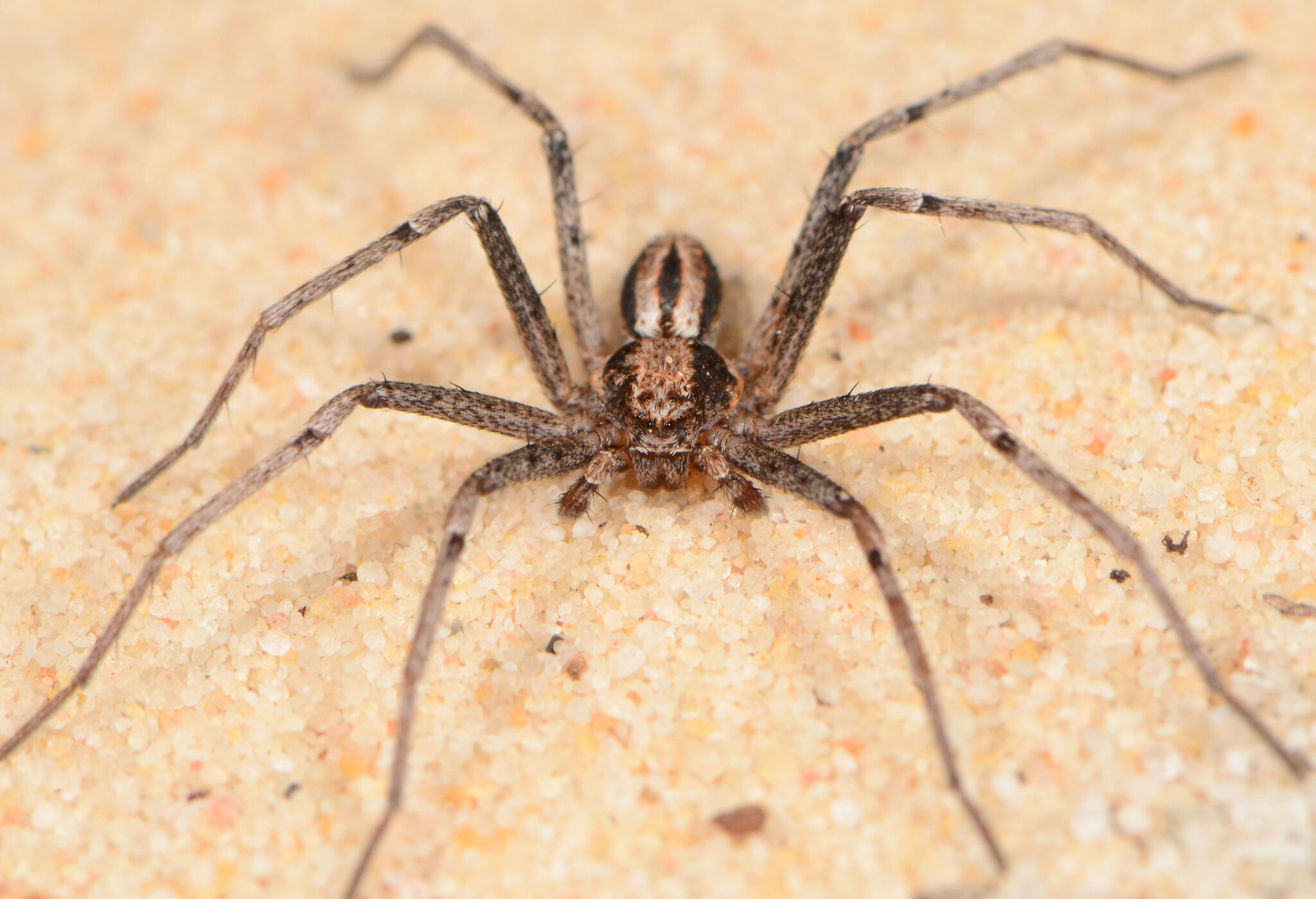
- male

Scientific classification
- Kingdom: Animalia
- Phylum: Arthropoda
- Subphylum: Chelicerata
- Class: Arachnida
- Order: Araneae
- Infraorder: Araneomorphae
- Family: Philodromidae
- Genus: Philodromus
- Species: P. grosi

Binomial name
- Philodromus grosi Lessert, 1943

= Philodromus grosi =

Oval Bodied Running Spider

Species of spider

Philodromus grosi is a species of spider in the family Philodromidae. It is commonly known as the oval bodied running spider.

== Distribution ==
Philodromus grosi is known from Congo, Zimbabwe, Namibia, and South Africa. In South Africa, it is recorded from five provinces including more than 10 protected areas, with an altitudinal range of 59-1909 m above sea level.

== Habitat and ecology ==
These are free-living plant dwellers sampled from soil surface from the Fynbos, Grassland and Savanna biomes.

== Description ==
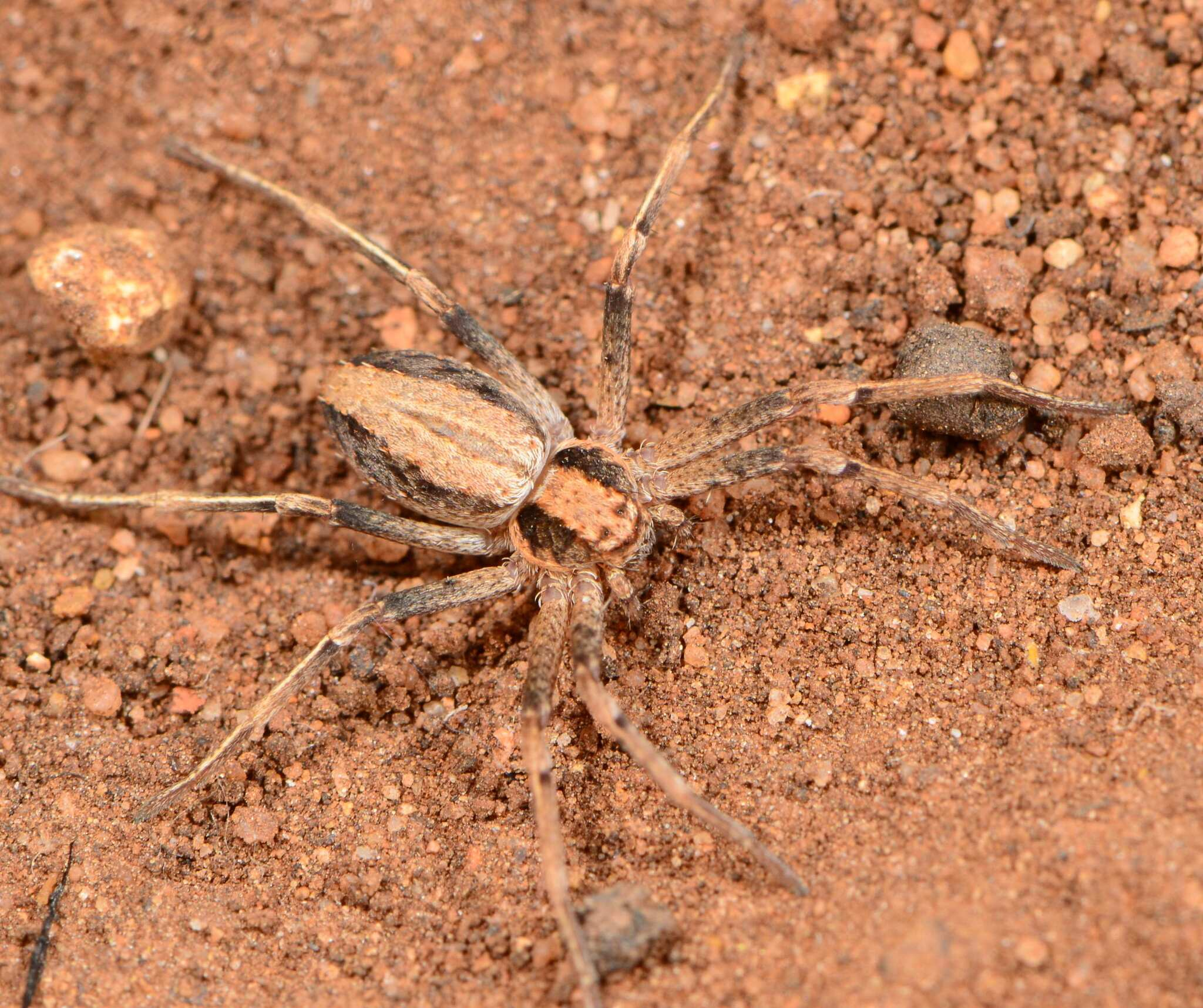
female

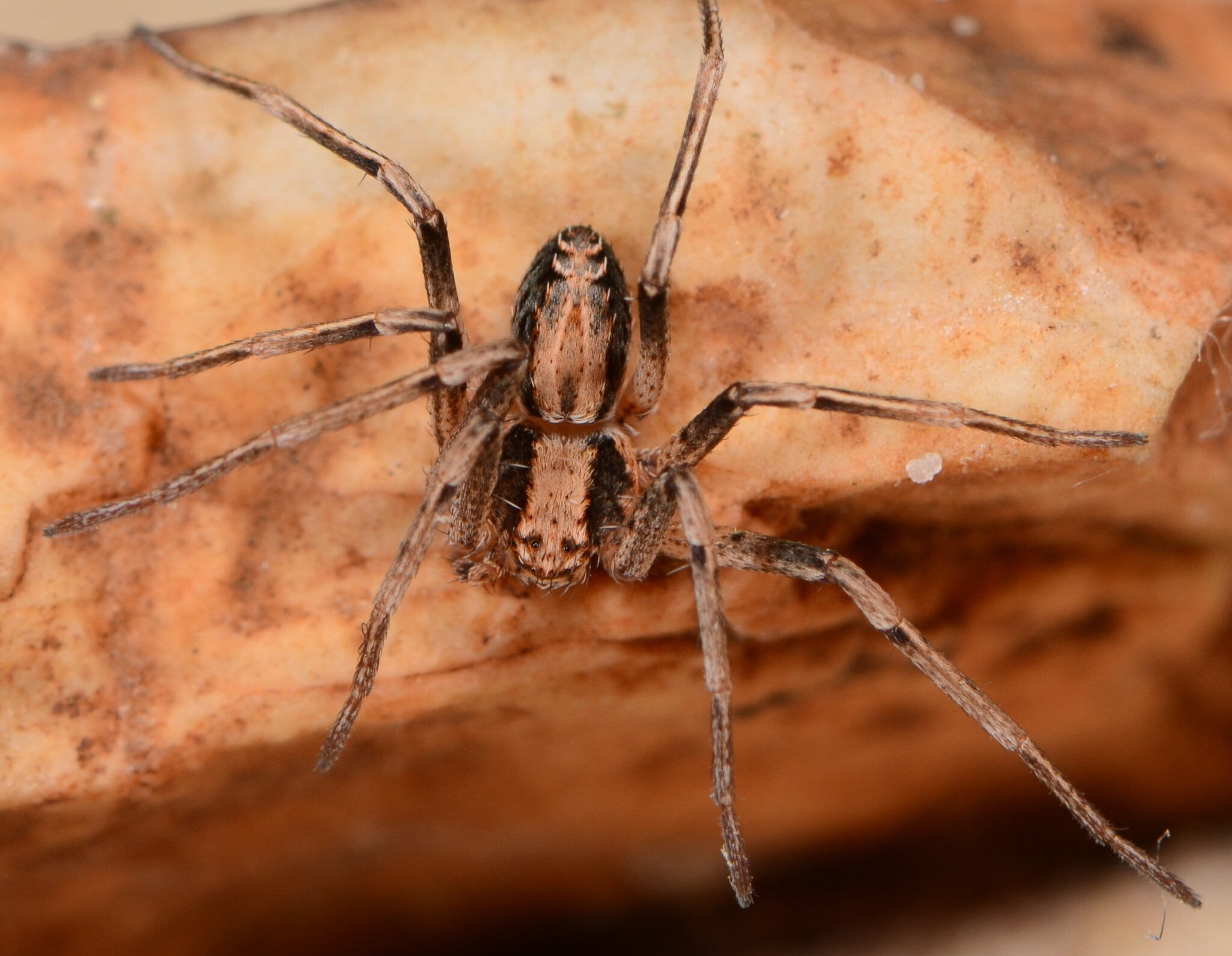
male

== Conservation ==
Philodromus grosi is listed as Least Concern by the South African National Biodiversity Institute due to its wide range. The species is protected in more than 10 protected areas.

== Taxonomy ==
The species was originally described by Lessert (1943) from the Congo Republic. The genus has not been revised and the species is known only from the male.
