= Philodromus laricium =

Scientific classification
- Kingdom: Animalia
- Phylum: Arthropoda
- Subphylum: Chelicerata
- Class: Arachnida
- Order: Araneae
- Infraorder: Araneomorphae
- Family: Philodromidae
- Genus: Philodromus
- Species: P. laricium

Binomial name
- Philodromus laricium Simon, 1875

Species of spider

Philodromus laricium is a spider species found in Spain, France, Italy, Switzerland, Germany, Austria, and Slovenia.
