= Philodromus anomalus =

Scientific classification
- Domain: Eukaryota
- Kingdom: Animalia
- Phylum: Arthropoda
- Subphylum: Chelicerata
- Class: Arachnida
- Order: Araneae
- Infraorder: Araneomorphae
- Family: Philodromidae
- Genus: Philodromus
- Species: P. anomalus

Binomial name
- Philodromus anomalus Gertsch, 1934

Species of spider

Philodromus anomalus is a spider in the family Philodromidae ("running crab spiders"), in the infraorder Araneomorphae ("true spiders"). It is found in the USA.
