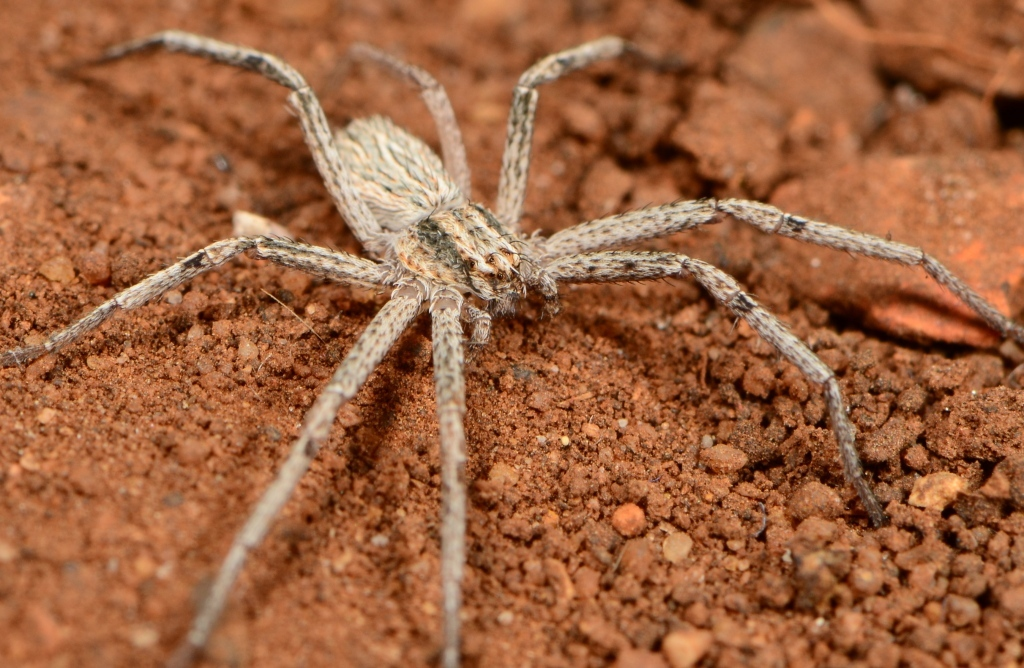
- female
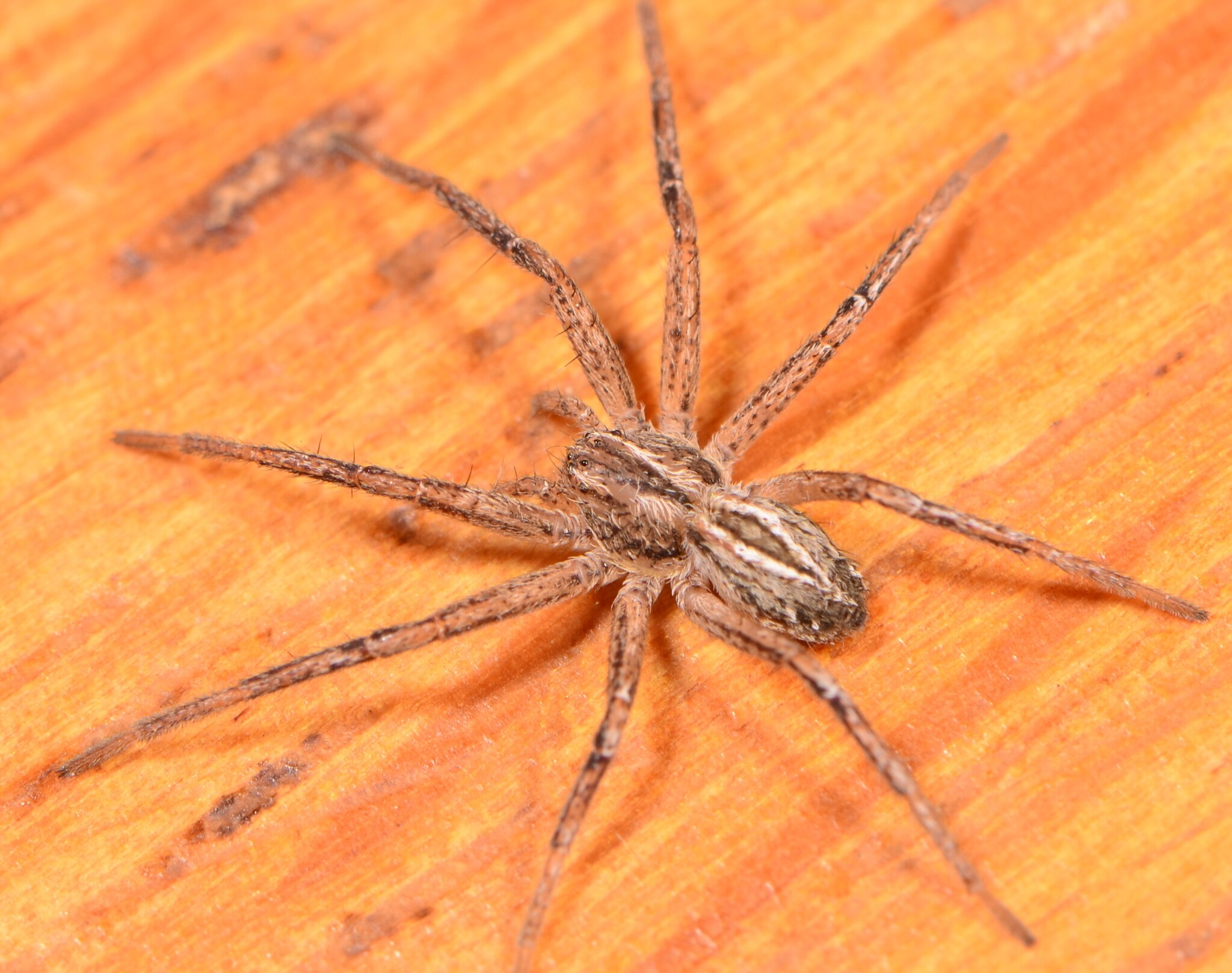
- female

Scientific classification
- Kingdom: Animalia
- Phylum: Arthropoda
- Subphylum: Chelicerata
- Class: Arachnida
- Order: Araneae
- Infraorder: Araneomorphae
- Family: Philodromidae
- Genus: Philodromus
- Species: P. brachycephalus

Binomial name
- Philodromus brachycephalus Lawrence, 1952

= Philodromus brachycephalus =

Spotted Running Spider

Species of spider

Philodromus brachycephalus is a species of spider in the family Philodromidae. It is commonly known as the spotted running spider.

== Distribution ==
Philodromus brachycephalus is known from Tanzania and South Africa. In South Africa, it is known from four provinces including six protected areas, with an altitudinal range of 48 to 1,730 m (157 to 5,676 ft) above sea level.

== Habitat and ecology ==
The species are free-living plant dwellers sampled from vegetation. The species has been sampled from the Grassland, Savanna and Thicket biomes, and was also sampled from avocado and macadamia orchards.

== Description ==
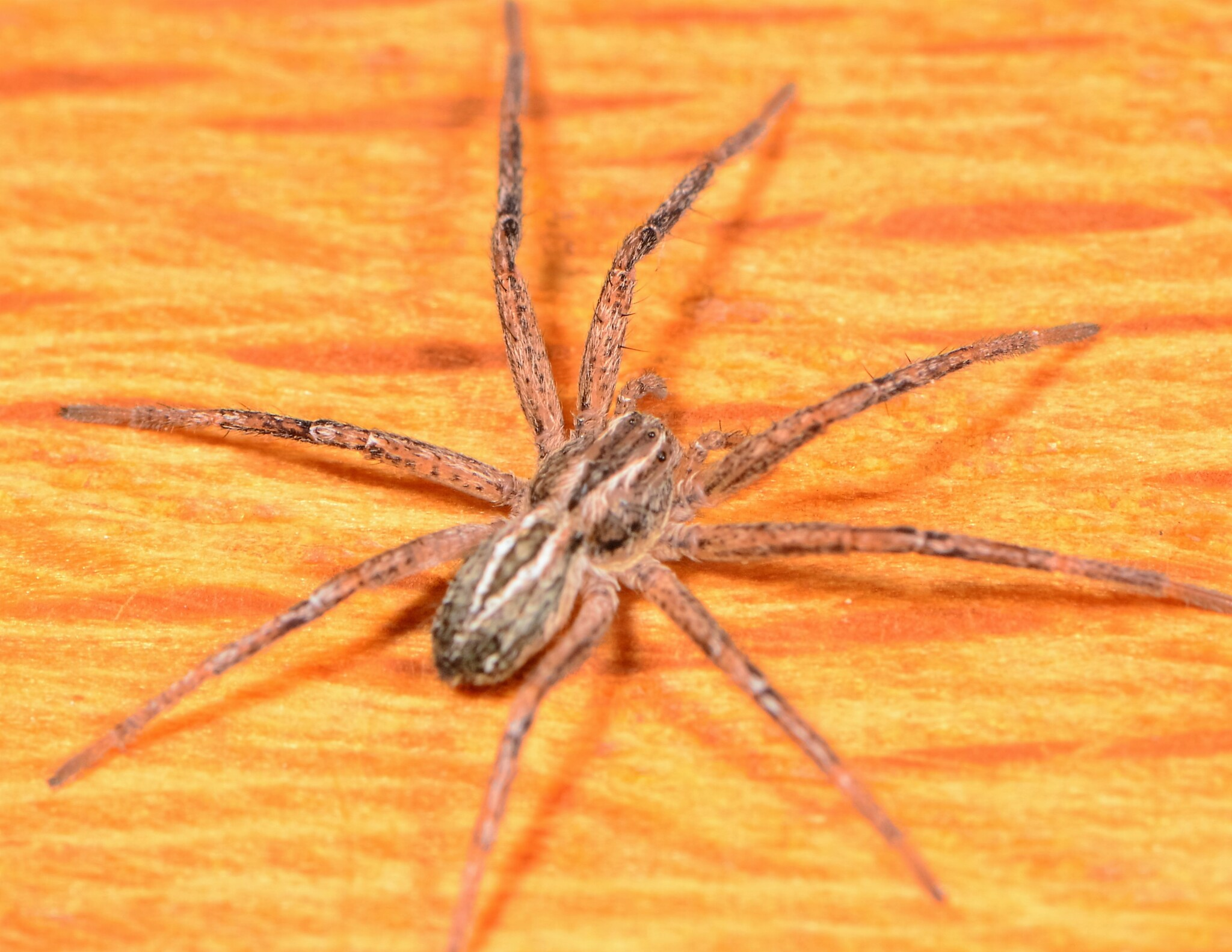
female

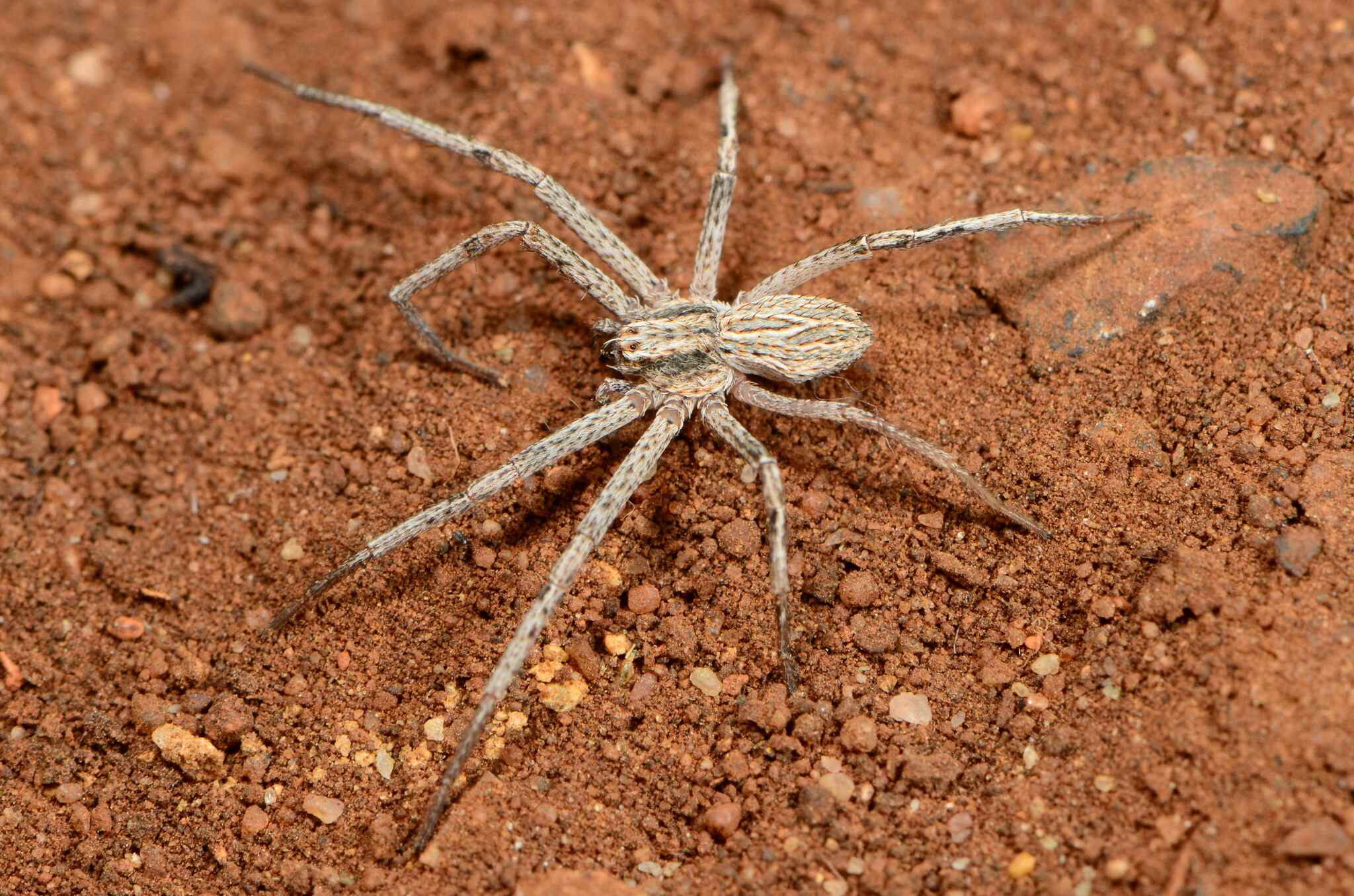
female

== Conservation ==
Philodromus brachycephalus is listed as Least Concern by the South African National Biodiversity Institute due to its wide range. The species is protected in six protected areas.

== Etymology ==
The specific name means "short-headed" in Greek.

== Taxonomy ==
The species was originally described by Lawrence (1952) from Pietermaritzburg in South Africa. The genus has not been revised and the species is known only from the female.
