= Philodromus parietalis =

Scientific classification
- Kingdom: Animalia
- Phylum: Arthropoda
- Subphylum: Chelicerata
- Class: Arachnida
- Order: Araneae
- Infraorder: Araneomorphae
- Family: Philodromidae
- Genus: Philodromus
- Species: P. parietalis

Binomial name
- Philodromus parietalis Simon, 1875

Species of spider

Philodromus parietalis is a spider species found in Spain and France.
