= Philodromus blanckei =

Scientific classification
- Kingdom: Animalia
- Phylum: Arthropoda
- Subphylum: Chelicerata
- Class: Arachnida
- Order: Araneae
- Infraorder: Araneomorphae
- Family: Philodromidae
- Genus: Philodromus
- Species: P. blanckei

Binomial name
- Philodromus blanckei (Wunderlich, 1995)

Species of spider

Philodromus blanckei is a spider species found in Corsica, Sardinia and Italy.
