= Ebo evansae =

Scientific classification
- Kingdom: Animalia
- Phylum: Arthropoda
- Subphylum: Chelicerata
- Class: Arachnida
- Order: Araneae
- Infraorder: Araneomorphae
- Family: Philodromidae
- Genus: Ebo
- Species: E. evansae

Binomial name
- Ebo evansae Sauer & Platnick, 1972

Species of spider

Ebo evansae is a species of running crab spider in the family Philodromidae. It is found in the United States and Mexico.
