= Pulchellodromus pardalis =

Scientific classification
- Kingdom: Animalia
- Phylum: Arthropoda
- Subphylum: Chelicerata
- Class: Arachnida
- Order: Araneae
- Infraorder: Araneomorphae
- Family: Philodromidae
- Genus: Pulchellodromus
- Species: P. pardalis

Binomial name
- Pulchellodromus pardalis (Muster & Bosmans, 2007)

Synonyms
- Philodromus pardalis Muster & Bosmans

Species of spider

Pulchellodromus pardalis is a spider species found in Europe (Portugal, Spain) and North Africa (Algeria to Egypt).
