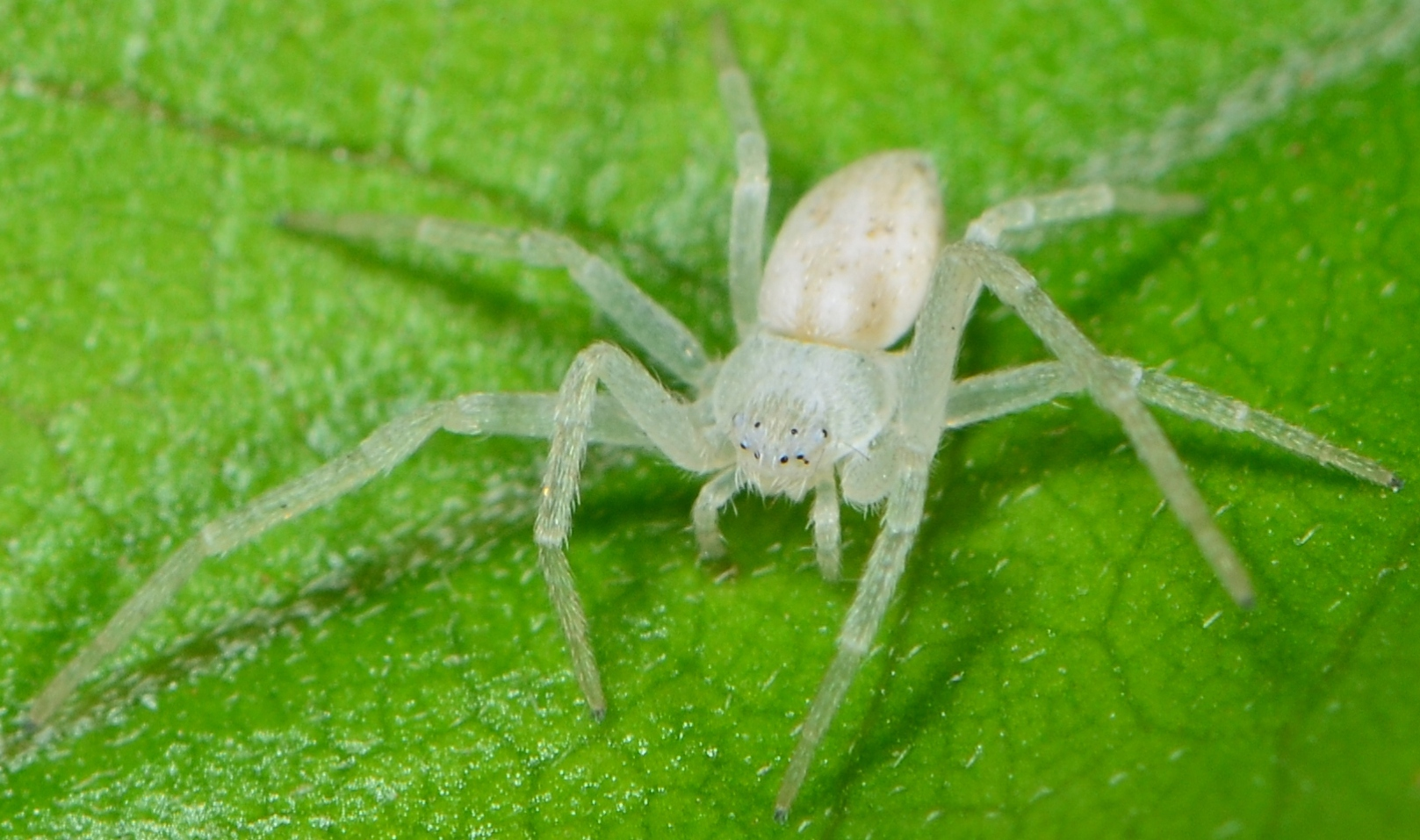
- female
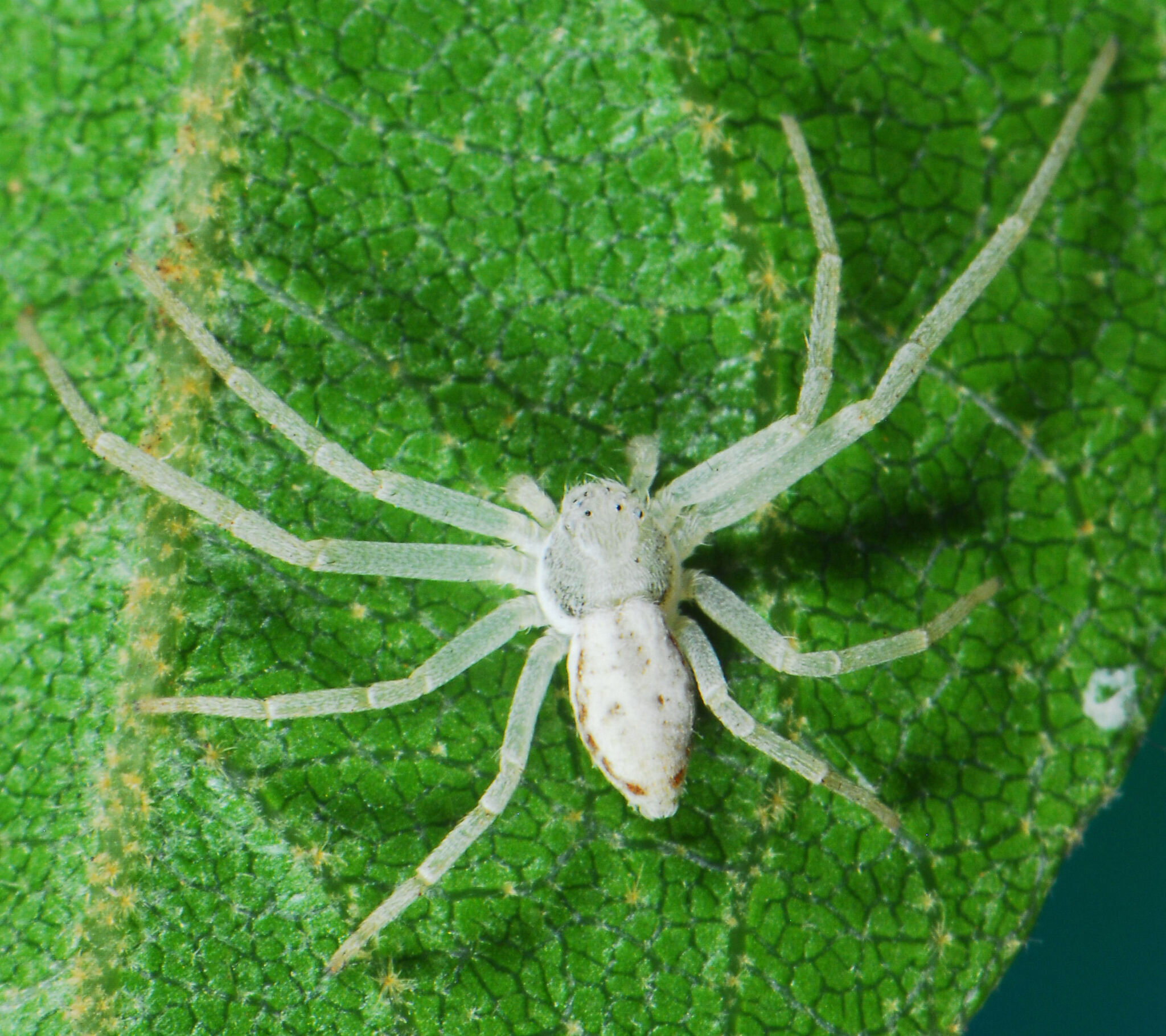
- female

Scientific classification
- Kingdom: Animalia
- Phylum: Arthropoda
- Subphylum: Chelicerata
- Class: Arachnida
- Order: Araneae
- Infraorder: Araneomorphae
- Family: Philodromidae
- Genus: Gephyrota
- Species: G. glauca

Binomial name
- Gephyrota glauca (Jézéquel, 1966)

= Gephyrota glauca =

White Running Spider

Species of spider

Gephyrota glauca is a species of spider in the family Philodromidae. It is commonly known as the white running spider.

== Distribution ==
Gephyrota glauca has a wide distribution across several African countries including Cameroon, Ivory Coast, and South Africa. In South Africa, the species occurs in eight provinces including the Eastern Cape, Free State, Gauteng, KwaZulu-Natal, Limpopo, Mpumalanga, Northern Cape, and Western Cape.

== Habitat and ecology ==
The species inhabits multiple biomes including Fynbos, Indian Ocean Coastal Belt, Savanna, and Thicket biomes, at altitudes ranging from 4 to 1730 m above sea level.

Gephyrota glauca are free-living plant dwellers commonly found in sweep net samples from vegetation. They have been recorded from protected areas and also sampled from crops such as macadamia, maize, pistachio, sunflower and tomatoes.

== Description ==
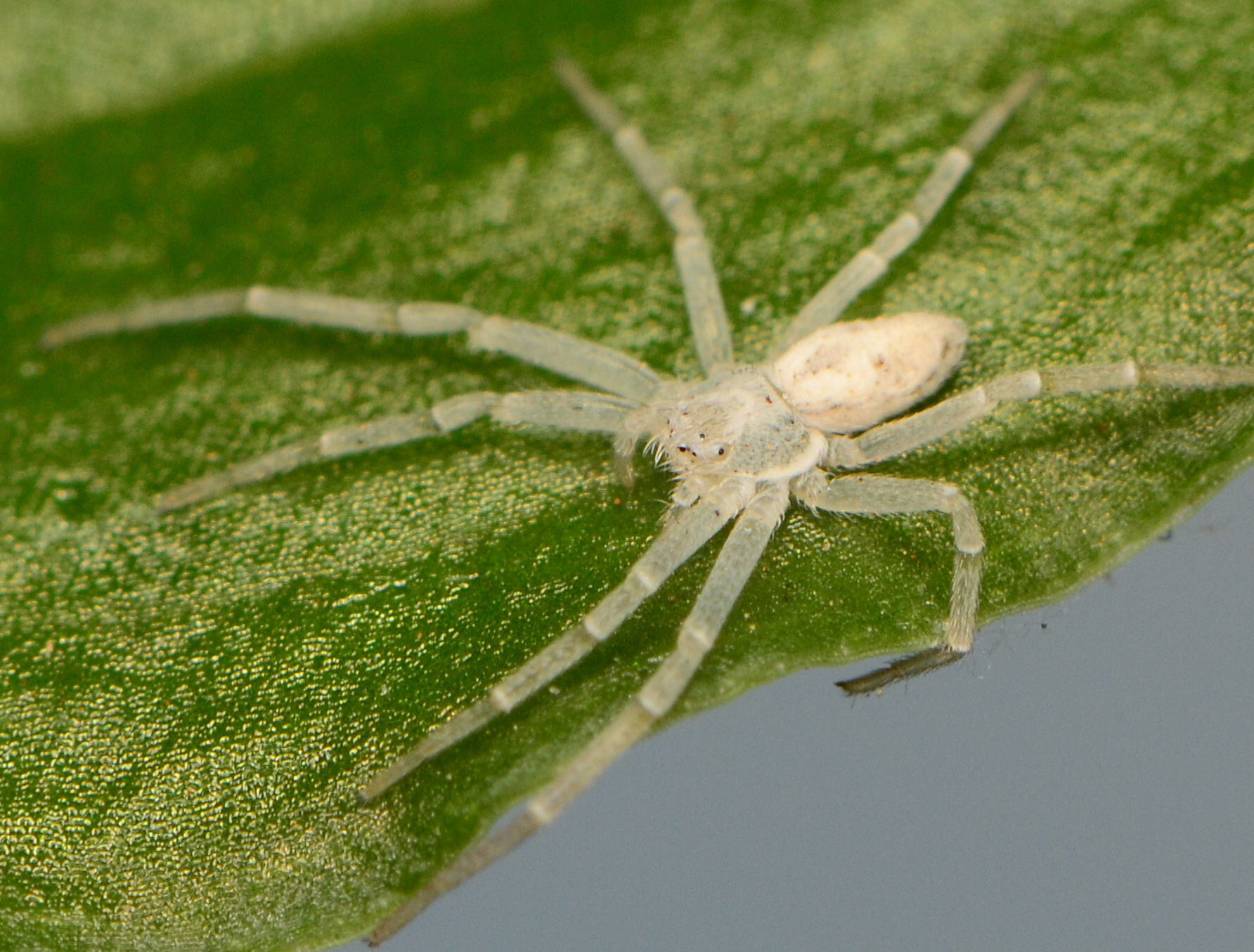
female

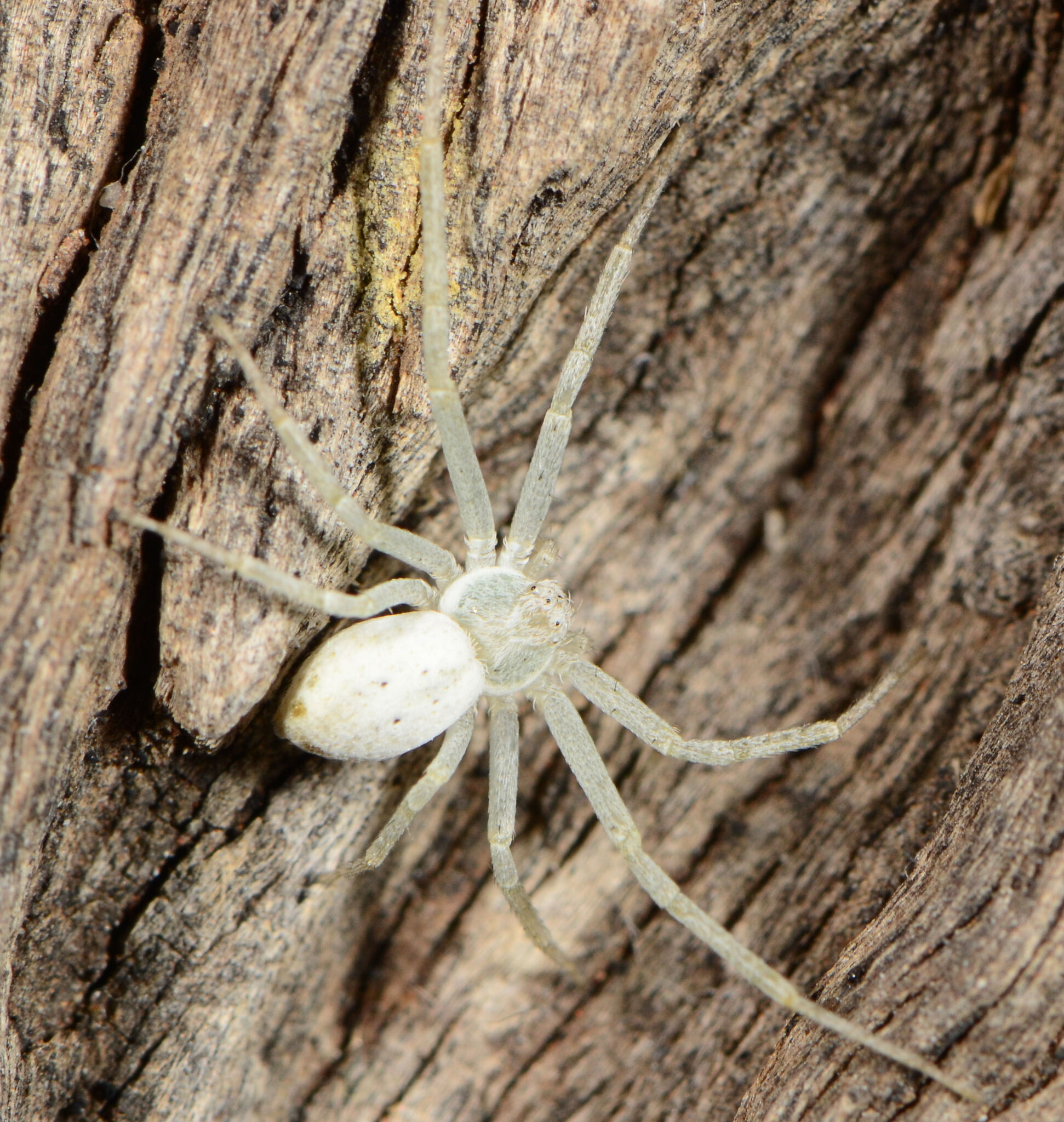
female

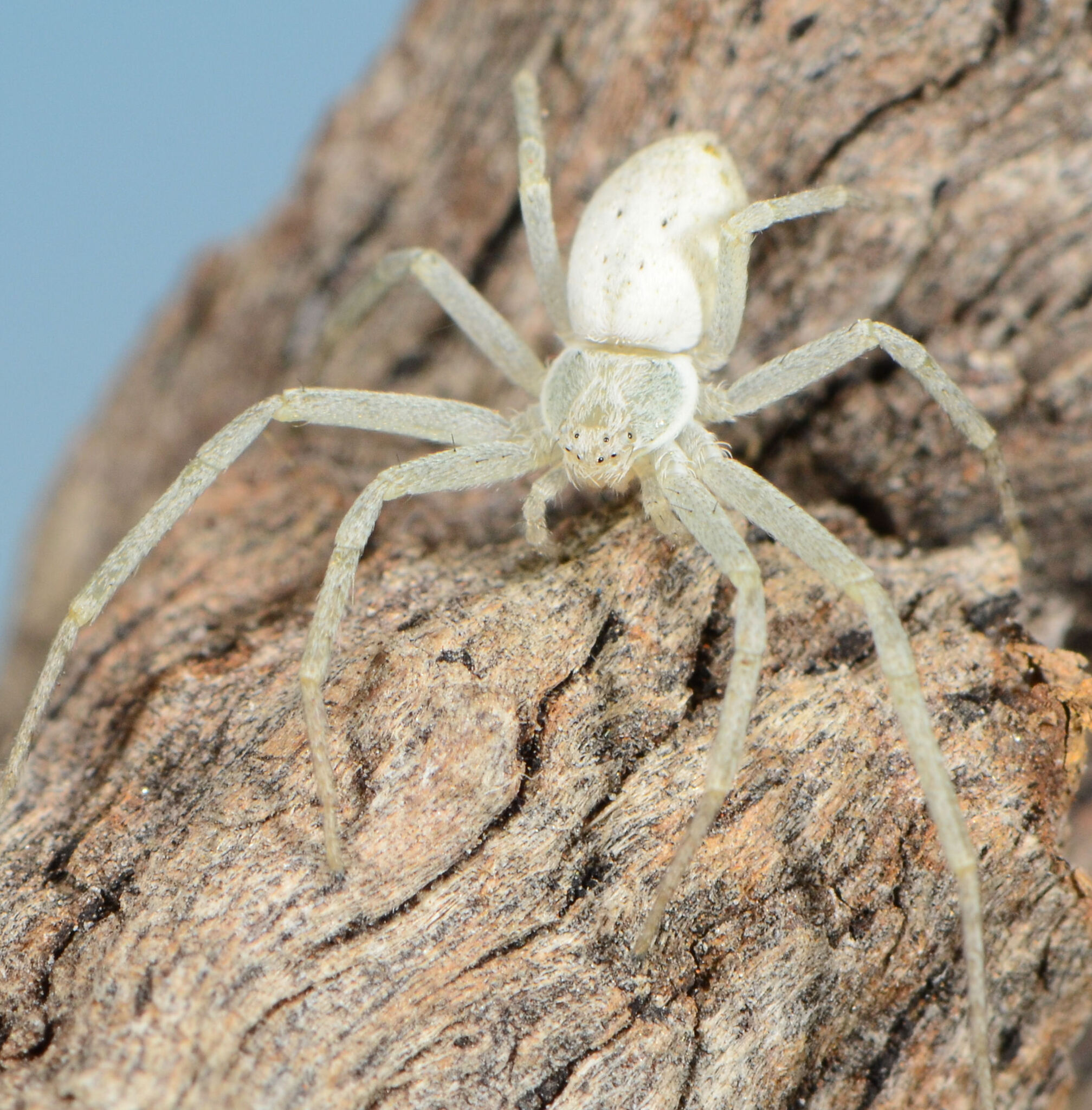
female

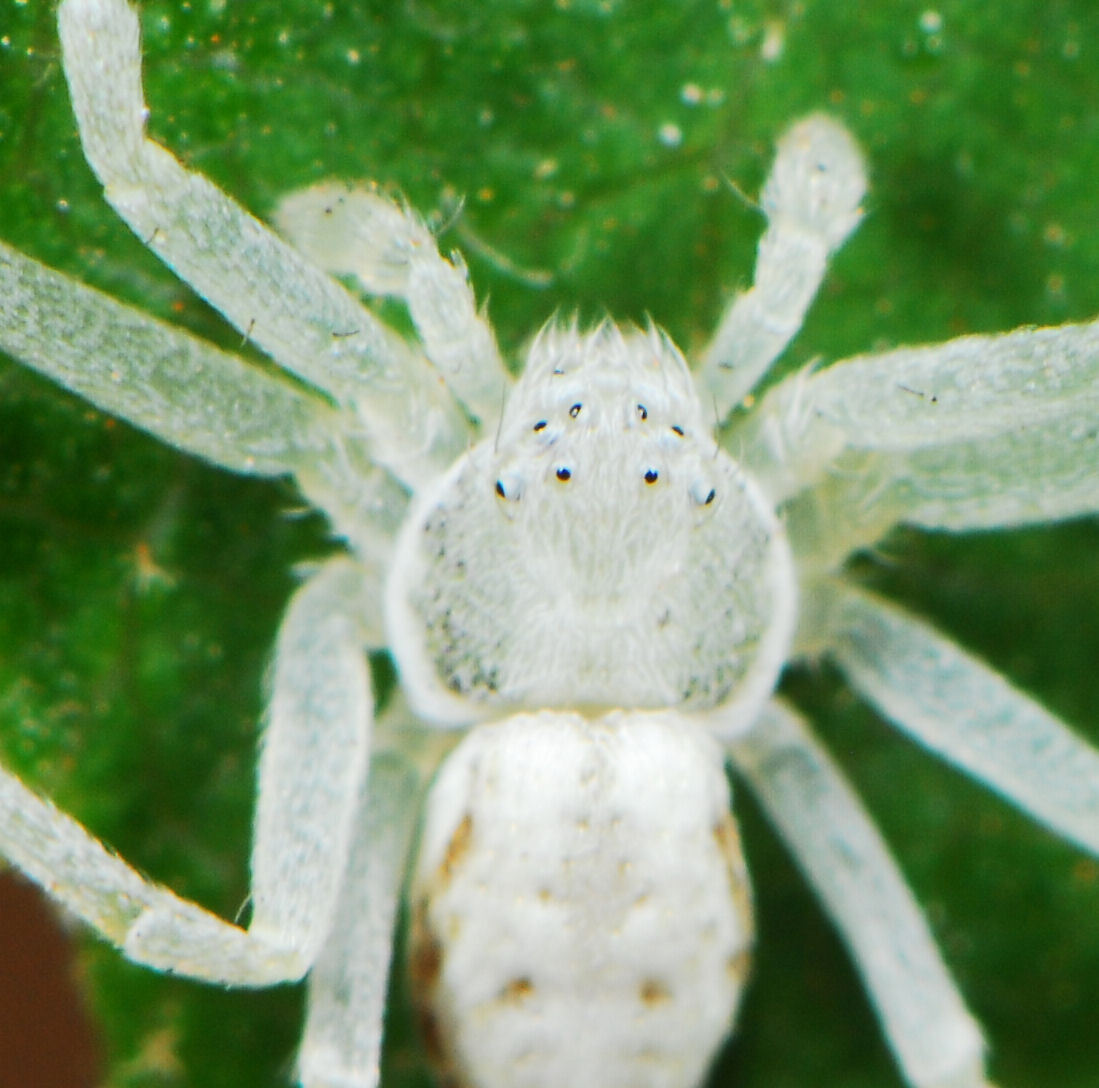
female

== Conservation ==
Gephyrota glauca is listed as Least Concern by the South African National Biodiversity Institute due to its wide range. The species is protected in more than 10 protected areas including Blouberg Nature Reserve, Nylsvley Nature Reserve, Tswalu Game Reserve and Amanzi Nature Reserve.

== Taxonomy ==
The species was originally described by Jézéquel (1966) as Gephyra glauca from Ivory Coast. It has not been revised and is known from both sexes.
