= Pulchellodromus medius =

Scientific classification
- Kingdom: Animalia
- Phylum: Arthropoda
- Subphylum: Chelicerata
- Class: Arachnida
- Order: Araneae
- Infraorder: Araneomorphae
- Family: Philodromidae
- Genus: Pulchellodromus
- Species: P. medius

Binomial name
- Pulchellodromus medius (O. Pickard-Cambridge, 1872)

Synonyms
- Philodromus medius O. Pickard-Cambridge, 1872

Species of spider

Pulchellodromus medius is a spider species found in Europe (Italy, Greece, Cyprus, Ukraine) and Asia (Turkey, Israel, Iran, Azerbaijan).
