= Pulchellodromus simoni =

Scientific classification
- Kingdom: Animalia
- Phylum: Arthropoda
- Subphylum: Chelicerata
- Class: Arachnida
- Order: Araneae
- Infraorder: Araneomorphae
- Family: Philodromidae
- Genus: Pulchellodromus
- Species: P. simoni

Binomial name
- Pulchellodromus simoni (Mello-Leitão, 1929)

Synonyms
- Philodromus pernix Simon, 1875 (preoccupied); Philodromus simoni Mello-Leitão, 1929

Species of spider

Pulchellodromus simoni is a spider species found in Portugal, Spain and Algeria.

The species was first described in 1875 by Eugène Simon as Philodromus pernix. However, this name had already been used, so in 1929, Mello-Leitão gave it the replacement name Philodromus simoni. It was later moved to the genus Pulchellodromus.
