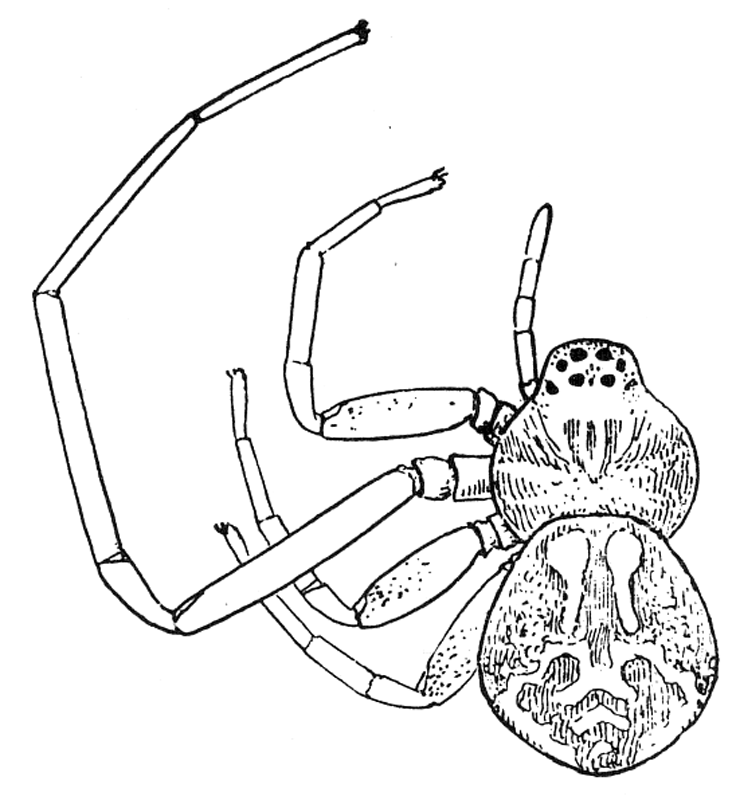

Scientific classification
- Kingdom: Animalia
- Phylum: Arthropoda
- Subphylum: Chelicerata
- Class: Arachnida
- Order: Araneae
- Infraorder: Araneomorphae
- Family: Philodromidae
- Genus: Ebo
- Species: E. latithorax

Binomial name
- Ebo latithorax Keyserling, 1884

= Ebo latithorax =

Species of spider

Ebo latithorax is a species of running crab spider in the family Philodromidae. It is found in the United States and Canada.
