= Rhysodromus alascensis =

Scientific classification
- Domain: Eukaryota
- Kingdom: Animalia
- Phylum: Arthropoda
- Subphylum: Chelicerata
- Class: Arachnida
- Order: Araneae
- Infraorder: Araneomorphae
- Family: Philodromidae
- Genus: Rhysodromus
- Species: R. alascensis

Binomial name
- Rhysodromus alascensis Keyserling, 1884

Species of spider

Rhysodromus alascensis is a species of running crab spider in the family Philodromidae. It is found in North America, Russia (Siberia), Kazakhstan, and China.
