= Apollophanes texanus =

Scientific classification
- Domain: Eukaryota
- Kingdom: Animalia
- Phylum: Arthropoda
- Subphylum: Chelicerata
- Class: Arachnida
- Order: Araneae
- Infraorder: Araneomorphae
- Family: Philodromidae
- Genus: Apollophanes
- Species: A. texanus

Binomial name
- Apollophanes texanus Banks, 1904

Species of spider

Apollophanes texanus is a species of running crab spider in the family Philodromidae. It is found in the USA and Mexico.
