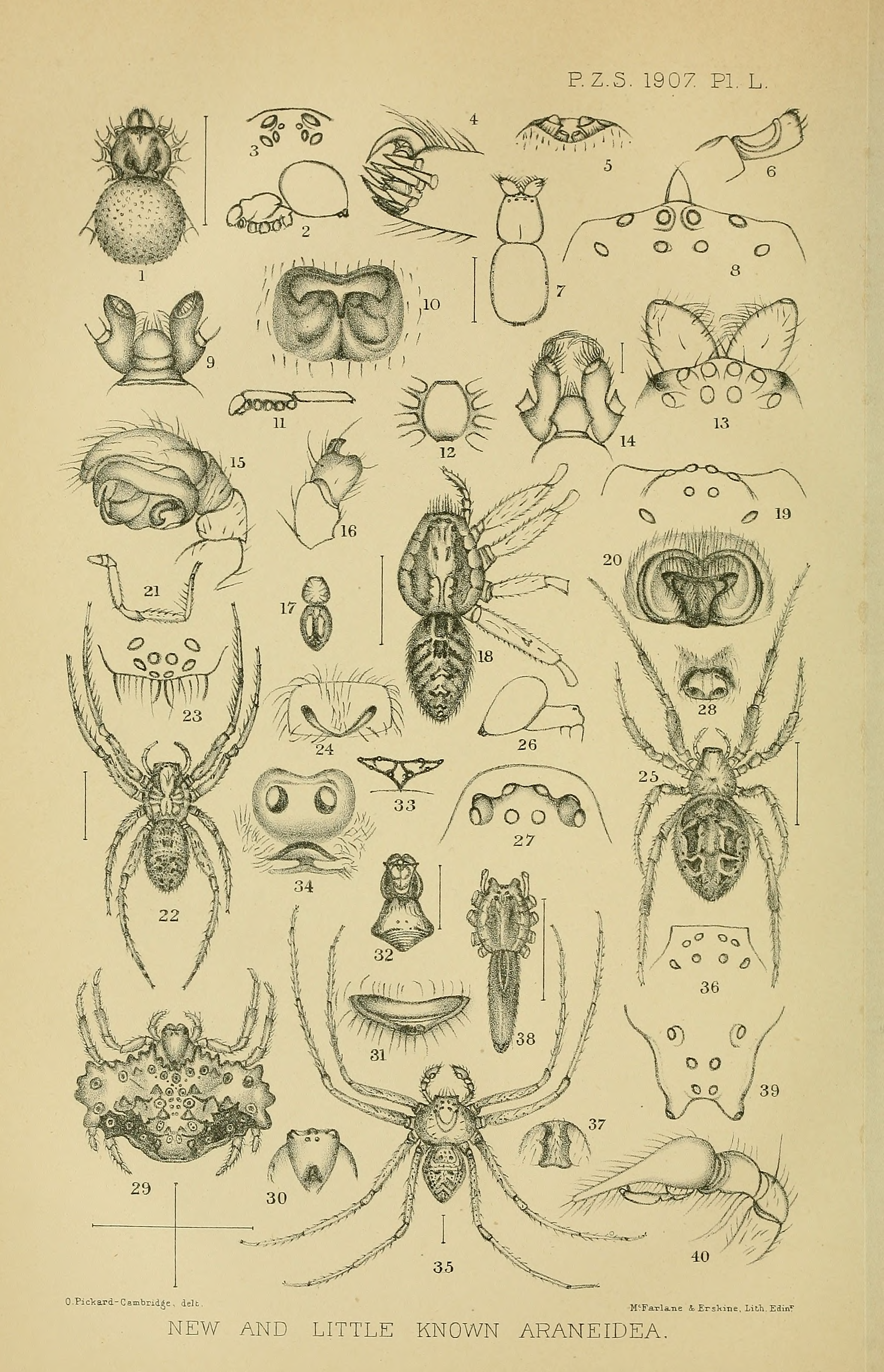
- "35-37 Philodromus punctigerus Pickard-Cambridge"

Scientific classification
- Kingdom: Animalia
- Phylum: Arthropoda
- Subphylum: Chelicerata
- Class: Arachnida
- Order: Araneae
- Infraorder: Araneomorphae
- Family: Philodromidae
- Genus: Pulchellodromus
- Species: P. punctiger

Binomial name
- Pulchellodromus punctiger O. P.-Cambridge, 1908

Synonyms
- Philodromus punctiger[us] O. Pickard-Cambridge, 1908

= Pulchellodromus punctiger =

Species of spider

Pulchellodromus punctiger is a spider species found in the Canary Islands and Spain.
