= Gephyrota virescens =

Scientific classification
- Kingdom: Animalia
- Phylum: Arthropoda
- Subphylum: Chelicerata
- Class: Arachnida
- Order: Araneae
- Infraorder: Araneomorphae
- Family: Philodromidae
- Genus: Gephyrota
- Species: G. virescens

Binomial name
- Gephyrota virescens (Simon, 1906)

Species of spider

Gephyrota virescens, is a species of spider of the genus Gephyrota. It is endemic to Sri Lanka.
