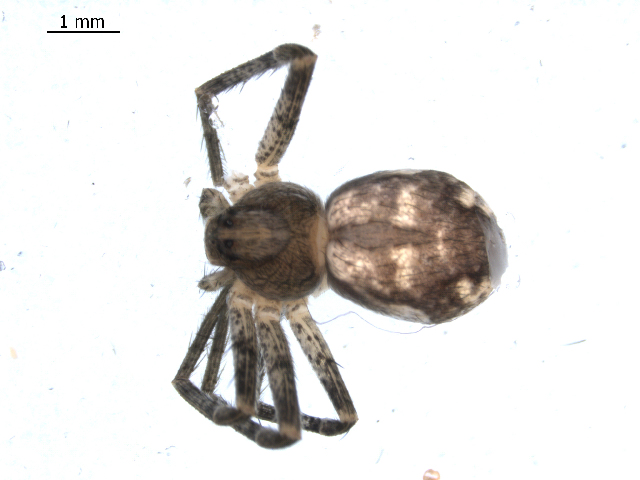
- Found in Canada

Scientific classification
- Kingdom: Animalia
- Phylum: Arthropoda
- Subphylum: Chelicerata
- Class: Arachnida
- Order: Araneae
- Infraorder: Araneomorphae
- Family: Philodromidae
- Genus: Apollophanes
- Species: A. margareta

Binomial name
- Apollophanes margareta Lowrie & Gertsch, 1955

= Apollophanes margareta =

Species of spider

Apollophanes margareta is a species of running crab spider in the family Philodromidae. It is found in the United States and Canada.
