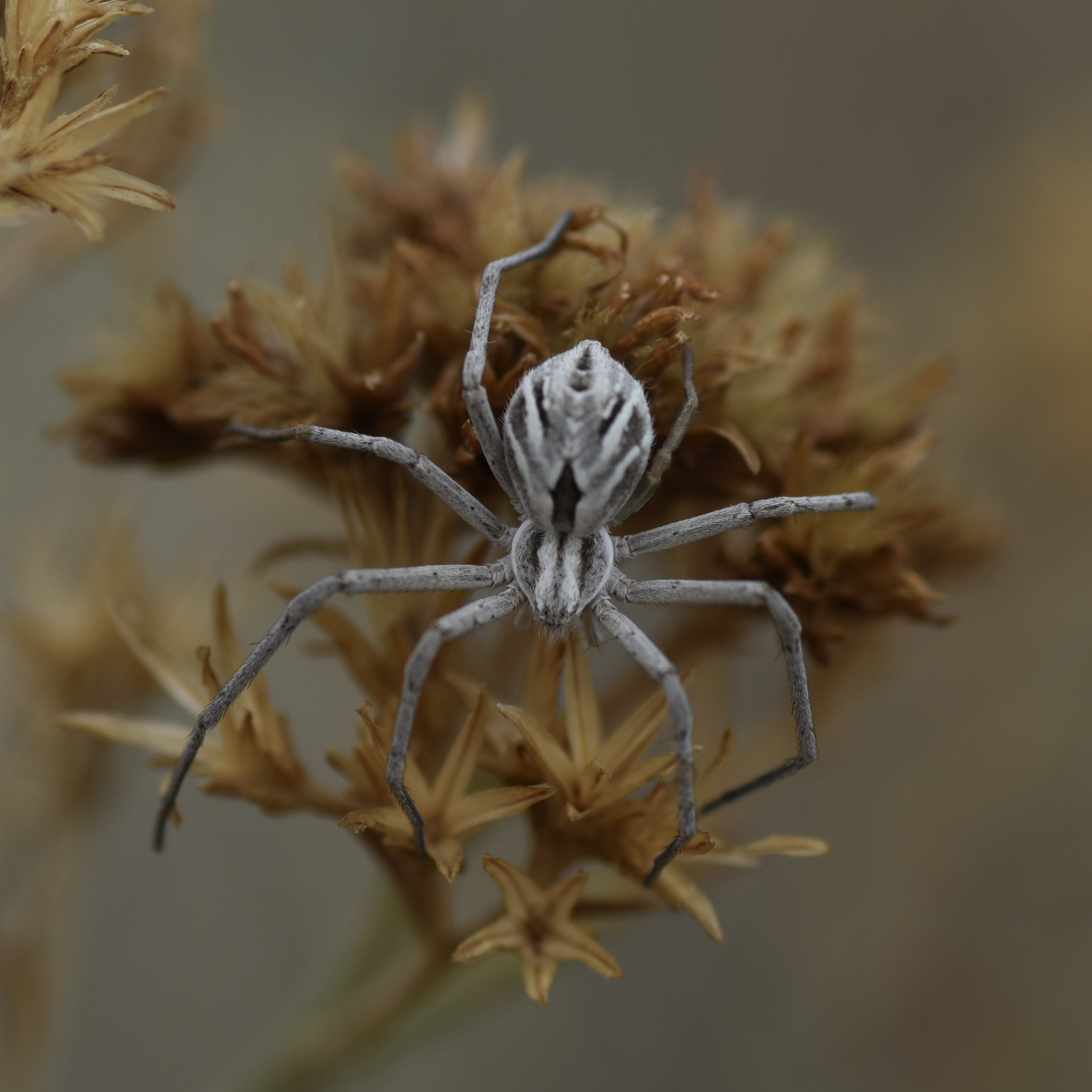

Scientific classification
- Kingdom: Animalia
- Phylum: Arthropoda
- Subphylum: Chelicerata
- Class: Arachnida
- Order: Araneae
- Infraorder: Araneomorphae
- Family: Philodromidae
- Genus: Rhysodromus
- Species: R. histrio

Binomial name
- Rhysodromus histrio (Latreille, 1819)

Synonyms
- Several, including: Thomisus histrio Latreille, 1819; Philodromus elegans Blackwall, 1859; Philodromus histrio Simon, 1875; Rhysodromus elegans (Blackwall, 1859)

= Rhysodromus histrio =

Species of spider

Rhysodromus histrio is a species of spider in the family Philodromidae. It is the type species of its genus. It is found in North America, Europe, Turkey, Caucasus, Russia (Siberia), Central Asia and China.

This species is distributed in:

- North America
- Europe
- Turkey
- Caucasus
- Russia
- Europe to Far East
- Central Asia
- People's Republic of China
