= Rhysodromus mysticus =

Scientific classification
- Domain: Eukaryota
- Kingdom: Animalia
- Phylum: Arthropoda
- Subphylum: Chelicerata
- Class: Arachnida
- Order: Araneae
- Infraorder: Araneomorphae
- Family: Philodromidae
- Genus: Rhysodromus
- Species: R. mysticus

Binomial name
- Rhysodromus mysticus Dondale & Redner, 1975

Species of spider

Rhysodromus mysticus is a species of running crab spider in the family Philodromidae. It is found in Russia, the United States, and Canada.
