= Halodromus =

Scientific classification
- Kingdom: Animalia
- Phylum: Arthropoda
- Subphylum: Chelicerata
- Class: Arachnida
- Order: Araneae
- Infraorder: Araneomorphae
- Family: Philodromidae
- Genus: Halodromus; Muster, 2009

Type species
- H. patellidens (Levy, 1977)

Species
- 6, see text

Genus of spiders

Halodromus is a genus of running crab spiders that was first described by C. Muster in 2009.

== Species ==
As of June 2019 it contains six species, found only in Asia, Africa, and Spain:

- Halodromus barbarae Muster, 2009 – Canary Is., Spain, Egypt, Israel, Saudi Arabia
- Halodromus deltshevi Muster, 2009 – Yemen
- Halodromus gershomi Muster, 2009 – Eritrea
- Halodromus patellaris (Wunderlich, 1987) – Cape Verde Is., Canary Is., Spain, Tunisia, Israel
- Halodromus patellidens (Levy, 1977) (type) – Cape Verde, Algeria to Middle East
- Halodromus vanharteni Logunov, 2011 – United Arab Emirates
