= Gephyrina =

Scientific classification
- Kingdom: Animalia
- Phylum: Arthropoda
- Subphylum: Chelicerata
- Class: Arachnida
- Order: Araneae
- Infraorder: Araneomorphae
- Family: Philodromidae
- Genus: Gephyrina; Simon, 1895

Type species
- G. alba Simon, 1895

Species
- 5, see text

Genus of spiders

Gephyrina is a genus of running crab spiders that was first described by Eugène Louis Simon in 1895.

== Species ==
As of June 2019 it contains five species, found in Bolivia, Brazil, Venezuela, and on the Windward Islands:

- Gephyrina alba Simon, 1895 (type) – Venezuela
- Gephyrina albimarginata Mello-Leitão, 1929 – Brazil
- Gephyrina imbecilla Mello-Leitão, 1917 – Brazil
- Gephyrina insularis Simon, 1898 – St. Vincent
- Gephyrina nigropunctata Mello-Leitão, 1929 – Brazil, Bolivia
