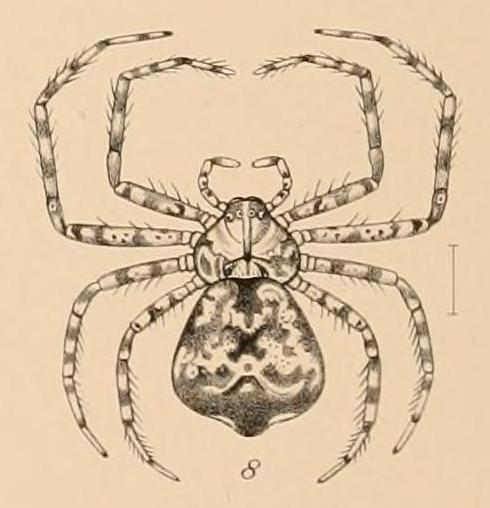
- Pagiopalus personatus

Scientific classification
- Kingdom: Animalia
- Phylum: Arthropoda
- Subphylum: Chelicerata
- Class: Arachnida
- Order: Araneae
- Infraorder: Araneomorphae
- Family: Philodromidae
- Genus: Pagiopalus; Simon, 1900

Type species
- P. atomarius Simon, 1900

Species
- 4, see text

= Pagiopalus =

Genus of spiders

Pagiopalus is a genus of Hawaiian running crab spiders that was first described by Eugène Louis Simon in 1900.

== Species ==
As of June 2019 it contains four species, found only on Hawaii:

- Pagiopalus apiculus Suman, 1971 – Hawaii
- Pagiopalus atomarius Simon, 1900 (type) – Hawaii
- Pagiopalus nigriventris Simon, 1900 – Hawaii
- Pagiopalus personatus Simon, 1900 – Hawaii
