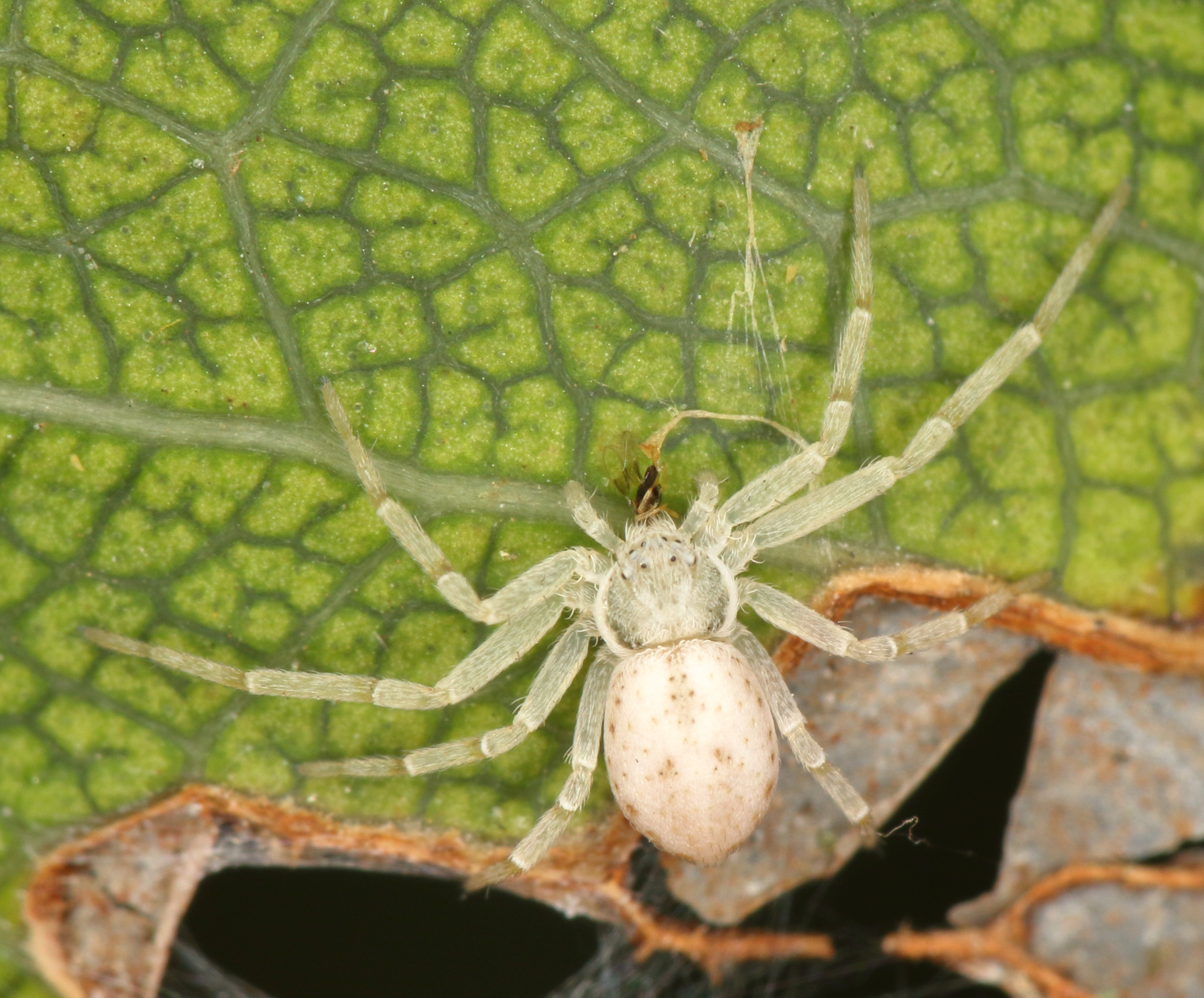
- G. glauca
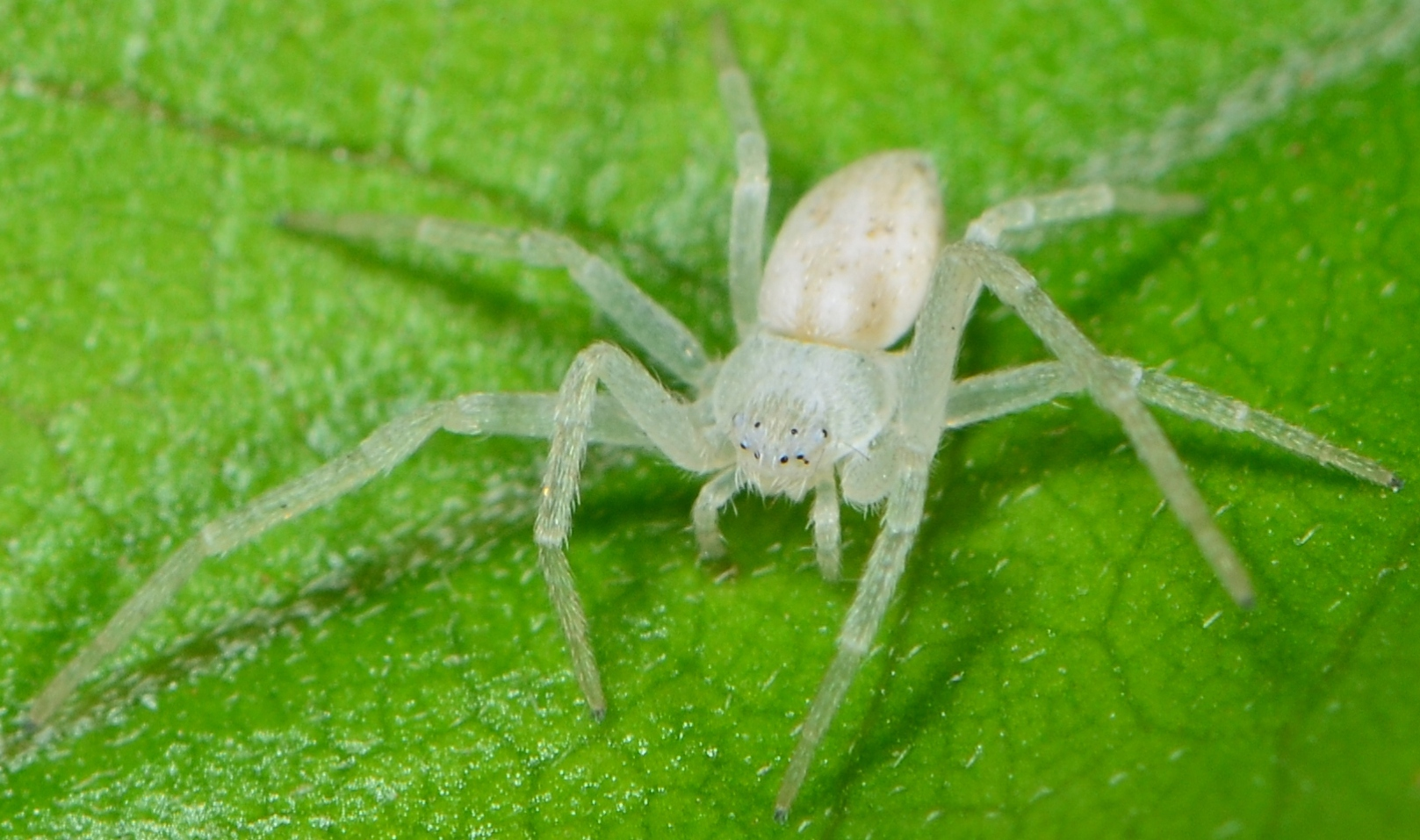
- female G. glauca

Scientific classification
- Kingdom: Animalia
- Phylum: Arthropoda
- Subphylum: Chelicerata
- Class: Arachnida
- Order: Araneae
- Infraorder: Araneomorphae
- Family: Philodromidae
- Genus: Gephyrota; Strand, 1932

Type species
- G. limbata (L. Koch, 1875)

Species
- 6, see text

= Gephyrota =

Genus of spiders

Gephyrota is a genus of running crab spiders that was first described by Embrik Strand in 1932.

== Distribution ==
Species in this genus are found in Asia and Africa, with one species found in Australia.

== Species ==
As of October 2025, this genus includes six species:

- Gephyrota candida (Simon, 1895) – Cambodia, Vietnam
- Gephyrota glauca (Jézéquel, 1966) – Ivory Coast, Cameroon, Zimbabwe, South Africa
- Gephyrota limbata (L. Koch, 1875) – Australia (Queensland) (type species)
- Gephyrota nigrolineata (Simon, 1909) – Vietnam
- Gephyrota pudica (Simon, 1906) – India
- Gephyrota virescens (Simon, 1906) – Sri Lanka
