= Rhysodromus =

Scientific classification
- Domain: Eukaryota
- Kingdom: Animalia
- Phylum: Arthropoda
- Subphylum: Chelicerata
- Class: Arachnida
- Order: Araneae
- Infraorder: Araneomorphae
- Family: Philodromidae
- Genus: Rhysodromus; Schick

Type species
- Rhysodromus histrio

Species
- 28, see text

Genus of spiders

Rhysodromus is a genus of spiders in the family Philodromidae. It was first described in 1965 by Schick. As of 2022, it contains 28 species.

== Species ==
Rhysodromus comprises the following species:

- Rhysodromus ablegminus (Szita & Logunov, 2008) – Kazakhstan
- Rhysodromus alascensis (Keyserling, 1884) – North America, Russia (Urals to Far East), Kazakhstan, China
- Rhysodromus angulobulbis (Szita & Logunov, 2008) – Russia (South Siberia)
- Rhysodromus caspius (Ponomarev, 2008) – Kazakhstan
- Rhysodromus cinerascens (O. Pickard-Cambridge, 1885) – India, China (Yarkand)?
- Rhysodromus fallax (Sundevall, 1833) – Europe, North Africa, Turkey, Caucasus, Russia (Europe to Far East), Kazakhstan, Iran, Central Asia, Mongolia, China
- Rhysodromus genoensis (Zamani & Marusik, 2021) – Iran
- Rhysodromus halophilus (Levy, 1977) – Israel
- Rhysodromus hierosolymitanus (Levy, 1977) – Israel, United Arab Emirates, Iran
- Rhysodromus hierroensis (Wunderlich, 1992) – Canary Is.
- Rhysodromus histrio (Latreille, 1819) – North America, Europe, Turkey, Caucasus, Russia (Europe to Far East), Central Asia, China
- Rhysodromus hui (Yang & Mao, 2002) – China
- Rhysodromus lanchowensis (Schenkel, 1936) – Russia (West Siberia to Far East), China, Korea, Japan
- Rhysodromus lepidus (Blackwall, 1870) – Mediterranean to India
- Rhysodromus leucomarginatus (Paik, 1979) – China, Korea
- Rhysodromus medes (Zamani & Marusik, 2021) – Iran
- Rhysodromus mysticus (Dondale & Redner, 1975) – Russia (Middle Siberia to Far East), USA, Canada
- Rhysodromus naxcivanicus (Logunov & Huseynov, 2008) – Azerbaijan
- Rhysodromus petrobius (Schmidt & Krause, 1995) – Cape Verde Is.
- Rhysodromus pictus (Kroneberg, 1875) – Central Asia to China
- Rhysodromus rikhteri (Logunov & Huseynov, 2008) – Armenia, Azerbaijan
- Rhysodromus signatus (O. Pickard-Cambridge, 1870) – St. Helena
- Rhysodromus sinaiticus (Levy, 1977) – Egypt
- Rhysodromus timidus (Szita & Logunov, 2008) – Russia (Caucasus), Kazakhstan, Pakistan
- Rhysodromus triangulatus (Urita & Song, 1987) – Kazakhstan to China
- Rhysodromus tuvinensis (Szita & Logunov, 2008) – Russia (West and South Siberia), Kazakhstan, Mongolia
- Rhysodromus xerophilus (Szita & Logunov, 2008) – Russia (Central Asia, South Siberia), Kazakhstan
- Rhysodromus xinjiangensis (Tang & Song, 1987) – Azerbaijan, Kazakhstan, Central Asia, China
