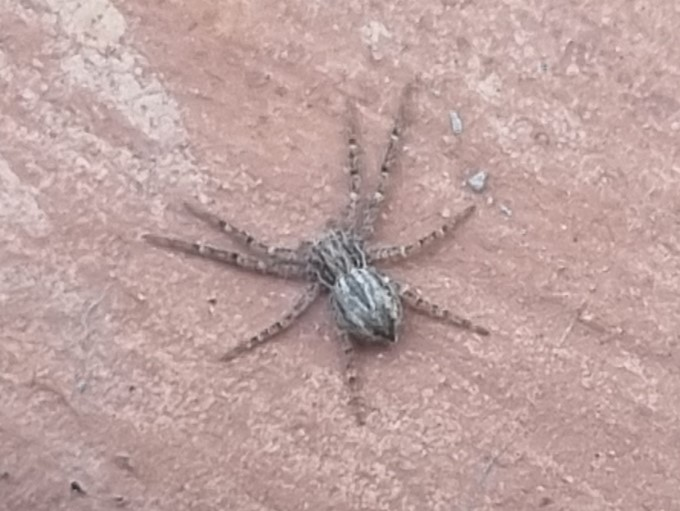

Scientific classification
- Kingdom: Animalia
- Phylum: Arthropoda
- Subphylum: Chelicerata
- Class: Arachnida
- Order: Araneae
- Infraorder: Araneomorphae
- Family: Philodromidae
- Genus: Petrichus; Simon, 1886

Type species
- P. marmoratus Simon, 1886

Species
- 14, see text

= Petrichus =

Genus of spiders

Petrichus is a genus of South American running crab spiders that was first described by Eugène Louis Simon in 1886.

== Species ==
As of May 2022 it contains fourteen species, found in Brazil, Argentina, Ecuador, Chile, Peru, Colombia and on the Falkland Islands:

- Petrichus anomalus (Mello-Leitão, 1938) – Argentina
- Petrichus eremicus Griotti & Grismado, 2022 – Chile
- Petrichus funebris (Nicolet, 1849) – Chile, Argentina
- Petrichus griseus Berland, 1913 – Colombia, Ecuador, Peru
- Petrichus junior (Nicolet, 1849) – Chile, Argentina
- Petrichus marmoratus Simon, 1886 (type) – Argentina
- Petrichus meridionalis (Keyserling, 1891) – Brazil
- Petrichus niveus (Simon, 1895) – Chile, Argentina, Falkland Is.
- Petrichus patagoniensis Griotti & Grismado, 2022 – Argentina
- Petrichus roijunenti Griotti & Grismado, 2022 – Chile, Argentina
- Petrichus sordidus Tullgren, 1901 – Argentina
- Petrichus spira Griotti & Grismado, 2022 – Argentina
- Petrichus tobioides Mello-Leitão, 1941 – Argentina
- Petrichus tullgreni Simon, 1902 – Chile, Argentina, Falkland Is.
