= Pedinopistha =

Scientific classification
- Kingdom: Animalia
- Phylum: Arthropoda
- Subphylum: Chelicerata
- Class: Arachnida
- Order: Araneae
- Infraorder: Araneomorphae
- Family: Philodromidae
- Genus: Pedinopistha; Karsch, 1880

Type species
- P. finschi Karsch, 1880

Species
- 5, see text

Synonyms
- Adrastidia Simon, 1900; Proernus Simon, 1900

Genus of spiders

Pedinopistha is a genus of Hawaiian running crab spiders that was first described by Ferdinand Anton Franz Karsch in 1880.

== Species ==
As of June 2019 it contains five species, found only on Hawaii:

- Pedinopistha aculeata (Simon, 1900) – Hawaii
- Pedinopistha finschi Karsch, 1880 (type) – Hawaii
- Pedinopistha longula (Simon, 1900) – Hawaii
- Pedinopistha schauinslandi (Simon, 1899) – Hawaii
- Pedinopistha stigmatica (Simon, 1900) – Hawaii
