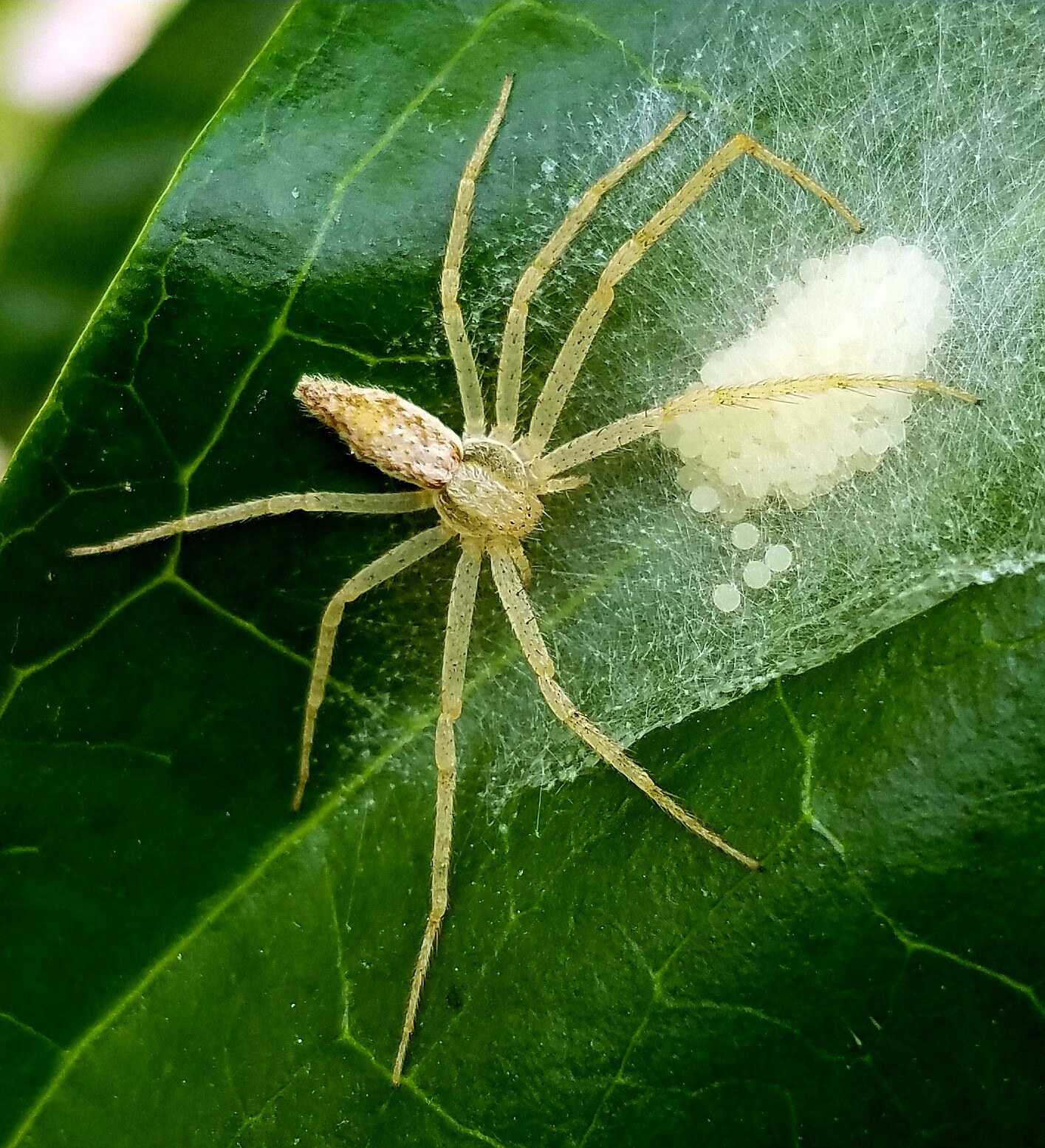
- A. punctipes in Guatemala
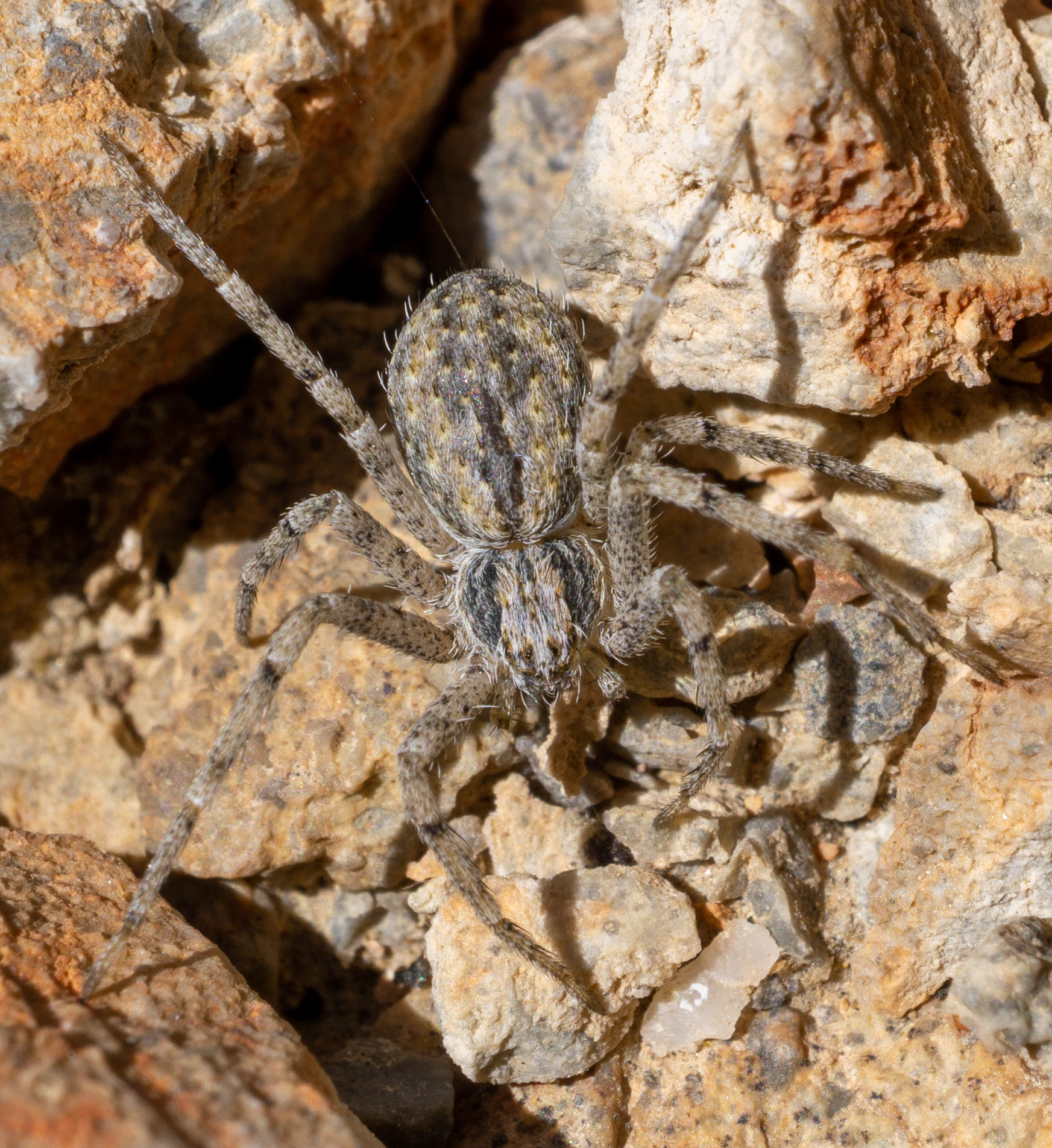
- A. texanus in California

Scientific classification
- Kingdom: Animalia
- Phylum: Arthropoda
- Subphylum: Chelicerata
- Class: Arachnida
- Order: Araneae
- Infraorder: Araneomorphae
- Family: Philodromidae
- Genus: Apollophanes; O. Pickard-Cambridge, 1898

Type species
- A. punctipes (O. Pickard-Cambridge, 1891)

Species
- 14, see text

Synonyms
- Horodromus Chamberlin, 1924; Pelloctanes Schick, 1965

= Apollophanes (spider) =

Genus of spiders

Apollophanes is a genus of running crab spiders that was first described by Octavius Pickard-Cambridge in 1898.

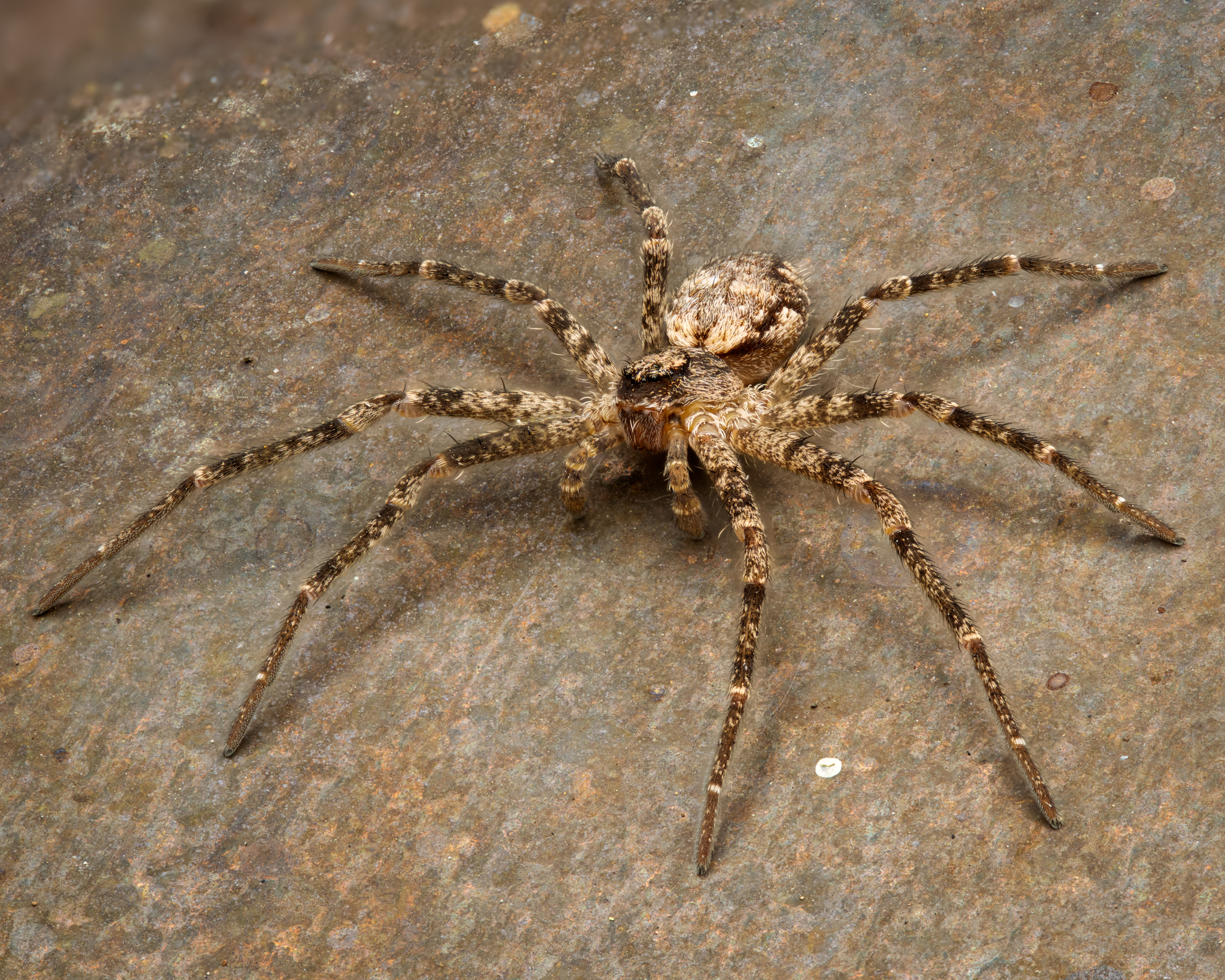
A. margareta in North America

== Species ==
As of September 2022 it contains fourteen species, found in the Caribbean, South America, Asia, Canada, Mexico, the United States, and Panama:

- Apollophanes aztecanus Dondale & Redner, 1975 – Mexico
- Apollophanes caribaeus Dondale & Redner, 1975 – Trinidad
- Apollophanes crispus Dondale & Redner, 1975 – Panama
- Apollophanes erectus Dondale & Redner, 1975 – Mexico
- Apollophanes fitzroyi Baert, 2013 – Ecuador (Galapagos Is.)
- Apollophanes gaucho Francisco, Ott & Teixeira, 2016 – Brazil
- Apollophanes indistinctus Gertsch, 1933 – Mexico
- Apollophanes lonesomegeorgei Baert, 2013 – Ecuador (Galapagos Is.)
- Apollophanes longipes (O. Pickard-Cambridge, 1896) – Mexico
- Apollophanes macropalpus (Paik, 1979) – Russia (West Siberia to Far East), Korea
- Apollophanes margareta Lowrie & Gertsch, 1955 – USA, Canada
- Apollophanes punctatus (Bryant, 1948) – Hispaniola
- Apollophanes punctipes (O. Pickard-Cambridge, 1891) (type) – USA to Panama
- Apollophanes texanus Banks, 1904 – USA, Mexico
