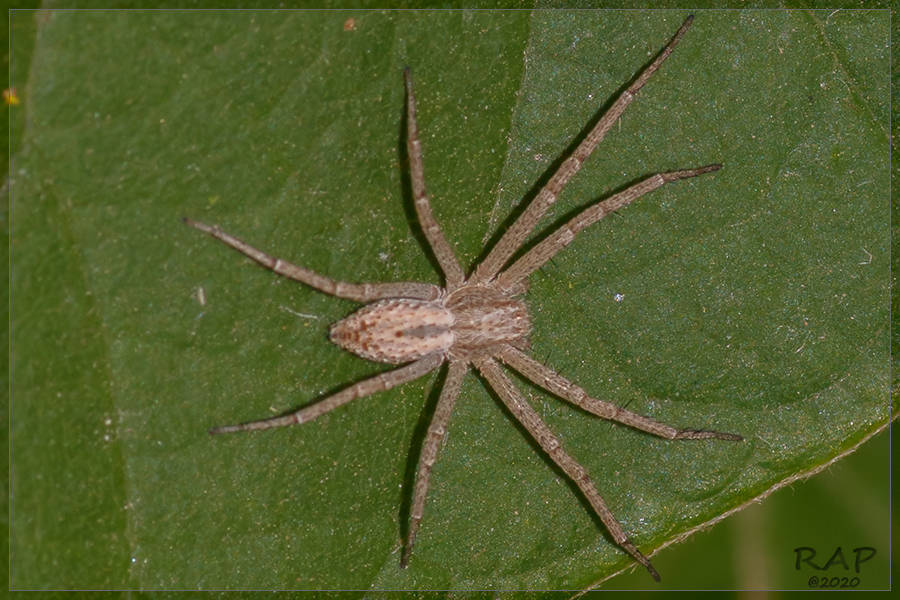

Scientific classification
- Kingdom: Animalia
- Phylum: Arthropoda
- Subphylum: Chelicerata
- Class: Arachnida
- Order: Araneae
- Infraorder: Araneomorphae
- Family: Philodromidae
- Genus: Paracleocnemis; Schiapelli & Gerschman, 1942

Type species
- P. termalis Schiapelli & Gerschman, 1942

Species
- P. apostoli Mello-Leitão, 1945 – Argentina; P. termalis Schiapelli & Gerschman, 1942 – Argentina

= Paracleocnemis =

Genus of spiders

Paracleocnemis is a genus of Argentinian running crab spiders that was first described by R. D. Schiapelli & B. S. Gerschman in 1942. As of June 2019 it contains only two species, found only in Argentina: P. apostoli and P. termalis.
