= Tibitanus =

Scientific classification
- Kingdom: Animalia
- Phylum: Arthropoda
- Subphylum: Chelicerata
- Class: Arachnida
- Order: Araneae
- Infraorder: Araneomorphae
- Family: Philodromidae
- Genus: Tibitanus; Simon, 1907

Type species
- T. sexlineatus Simon, 1907

Species
- T. nomas Simon, 1910 – Namibia; T. sexlineatus Simon, 1907 – Guinea-Bissau, Guinea

Genus of spiders

Tibitanus is a genus of African running crab spiders that was first described by Eugène Louis Simon in 1907. As of June 2019 it contains only two species, found only in Africa and Namibia: T. nomas and T. sexlineatus.
