= Sinodromus =

Scientific classification
- Kingdom: Animalia
- Phylum: Arthropoda
- Subphylum: Chelicerata
- Class: Arachnida
- Order: Araneae
- Infraorder: Araneomorphae
- Family: Philodromidae
- Genus: Sinodromus; Yao & Liu, 2024

Type species
- S. fujianensis Yao & Liu, 2024

Species
- 3, see text

Genus of spiders

Sinodromus is a genus of spiders in the family Philodromidae.

== Distribution ==
All Sinodromus species are endemic to China.

== Etymology ==
The genus name is a combination of "sino" (China) and the related genus Philodromus.

== Species ==
As of January 2026, this genus includes three species:

- Sinodromus fujianensis Yao & Liu, 2024 – China
- Sinodromus lanyue J. S. Zhang, C. W. Zhang & Zhong, 2025 – China
- Sinodromus perbrevis Yao & Liu, 2024 – China
