= Pulchellodromus =

Scientific classification
- Kingdom: Animalia
- Phylum: Arthropoda
- Subphylum: Chelicerata
- Class: Arachnida
- Order: Araneae
- Infraorder: Araneomorphae
- Family: Philodromidae
- Genus: Pulchellodromus; Wunderlich, 2012

Type species
- P. pulchellus (Lucas, 1846)

Species
- 13, see text

Genus of spiders

Pulchellodromus is a genus of running crab spiders that was first separated from Philodromus by J. Wunderlich in 2012.

== Distribution ==
Spiders in this genus are found in parts of Africa, Europe and Asia.

== Species ==
As of October 2025, this genus includes thirteen species:

- Pulchellodromus afroglaucinus (Muster & Bosmans, 2007) – Algeria
- Pulchellodromus bistigma (Simon, 1870) – Mediterranean
- Pulchellodromus glaucinus (Simon, 1870) – Mediterranean
- Pulchellodromus lamellipalpis (Muster, 2007) – Algeria
- Pulchellodromus mainlingensis (Hu & Li, 1987) – Tibet
- Pulchellodromus medius (O. Pickard-Cambridge, 1872) – Portugal, Italy, Greece, Turkey, Ukraine, Caucasus (Russia, Georgia, Azerbaijan), Iran
- Pulchellodromus navarrus Kastrygina, Kovblyuk & Polchaninova, 2016 – Spain
- Pulchellodromus pardalis (Muster & Bosmans, 2007) – Portugal, Spain, Algeria to Egypt
- Pulchellodromus pulchellus (Lucas, 1846) – Mediterranean (type species)
- Pulchellodromus punctiger (O. Pickard-Cambridge, 1908) – Canary Islands, Spain
- Pulchellodromus ruficapillus (Simon, 1885) – Mediterranean to Kazakhstan
- Pulchellodromus simoni (Mello-Leitão, 1929) – Portugal, Spain, Algeria
- Pulchellodromus wunderlichi (Muster & Thaler, 2007) – Canary Islands

In synonymy:

- P. glaucinoides (Wunderlich, 1987) = Pulchellodromus punctiger (O. Pickard-Cambridge, 1908)
- P. glaucinus (Strand, 1913) = Pulchellodromus pulchellus (Lucas, 1846)
- P. marionschmidti (Schmidt, 1990) = Pulchellodromus pulchellus (Lucas, 1846)
- P. salinarum (Denis, 1939) = Pulchellodromus glaucinus (Simon, 1870)
- P. torquatus (O. Pickard-Cambridge, 1873) = Pulchellodromus pulchellus (Lucas, 1846)
