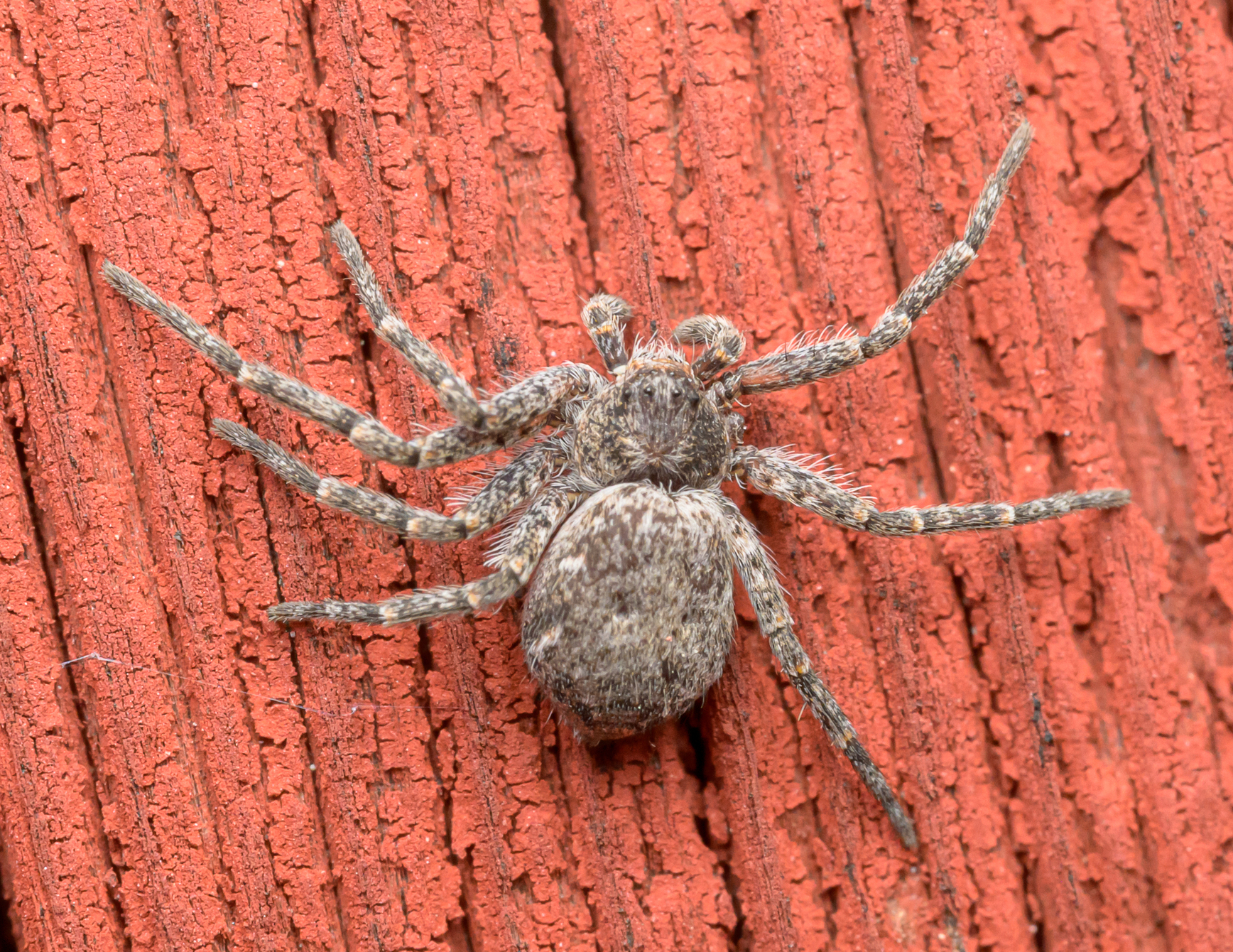
- female E. emarginatus in Sweden
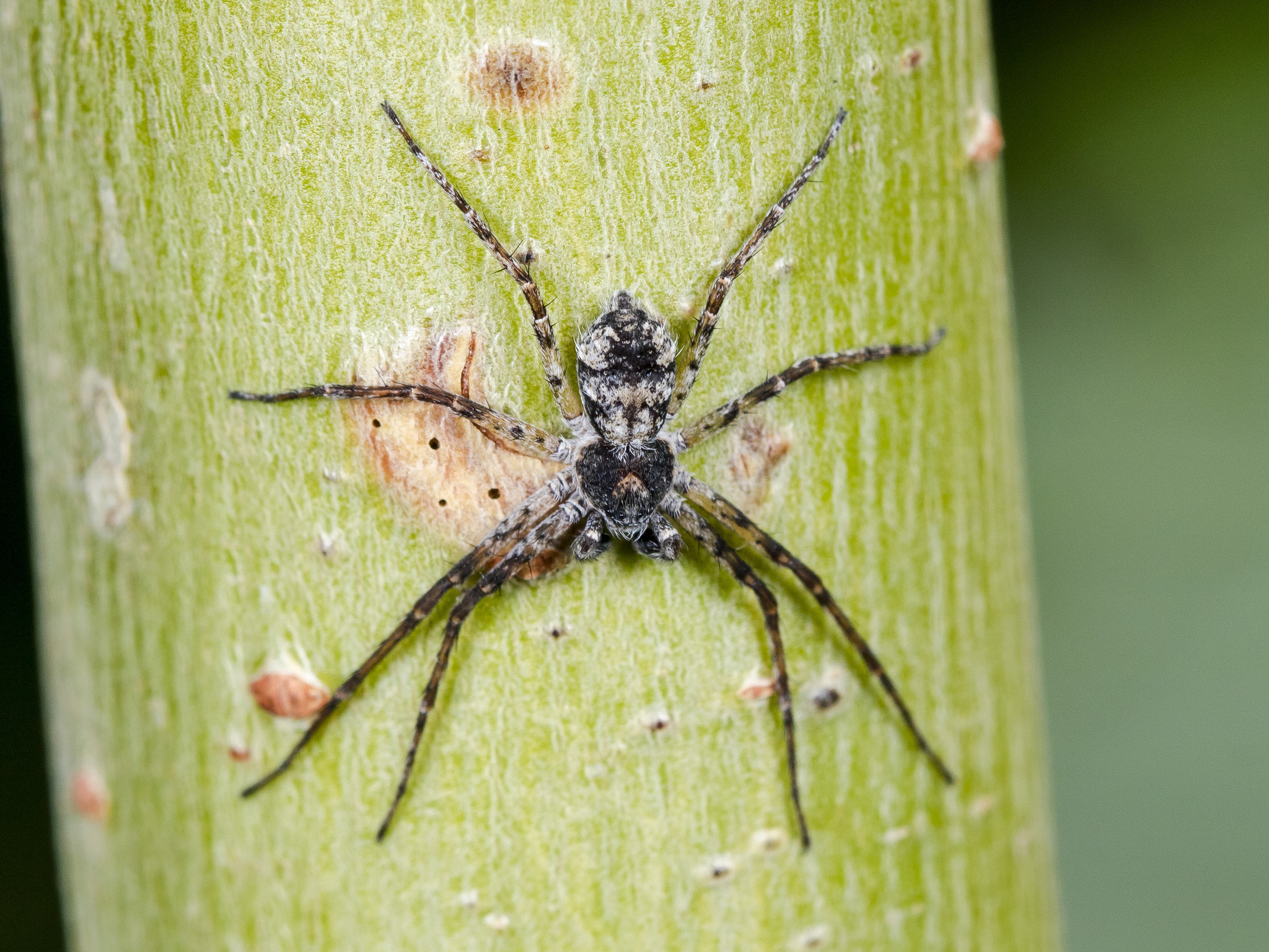
- male E. emarginatus in Kazakhstan

Scientific classification
- Kingdom: Animalia
- Phylum: Arthropoda
- Subphylum: Chelicerata
- Class: Arachnida
- Order: Araneae
- Infraorder: Araneomorphae
- Family: Philodromidae
- Genus: Emargidromus; Wunderlich, 2012

Type species
- Aranea emarginata Schrank, 1803

Species
- 3, see text

= Emargidromus =

Genus of spiders

Emargidromus is a genus of spiders in the family Philodromidae.

== Distribution ==
Emargidromus is found from Europe to China.

== Lifestyle ==
Spiders in this genus dwell in higher strata, mainly of needle trees.

== Species ==
As of January 2026, this genus includes three species:

- Emargidromus emarginatus (Schrank, 1803) – Europe, Caucasus, Russia (Europe to Far East), Kazakhstan, Iran, Central Asia, Mongolia, China, Korea, Japan
- Emargidromus lusitanicus (Kulczyński, 1911) – Portugal
- Emargidromus orientalis (Schenkel, 1963) – China
