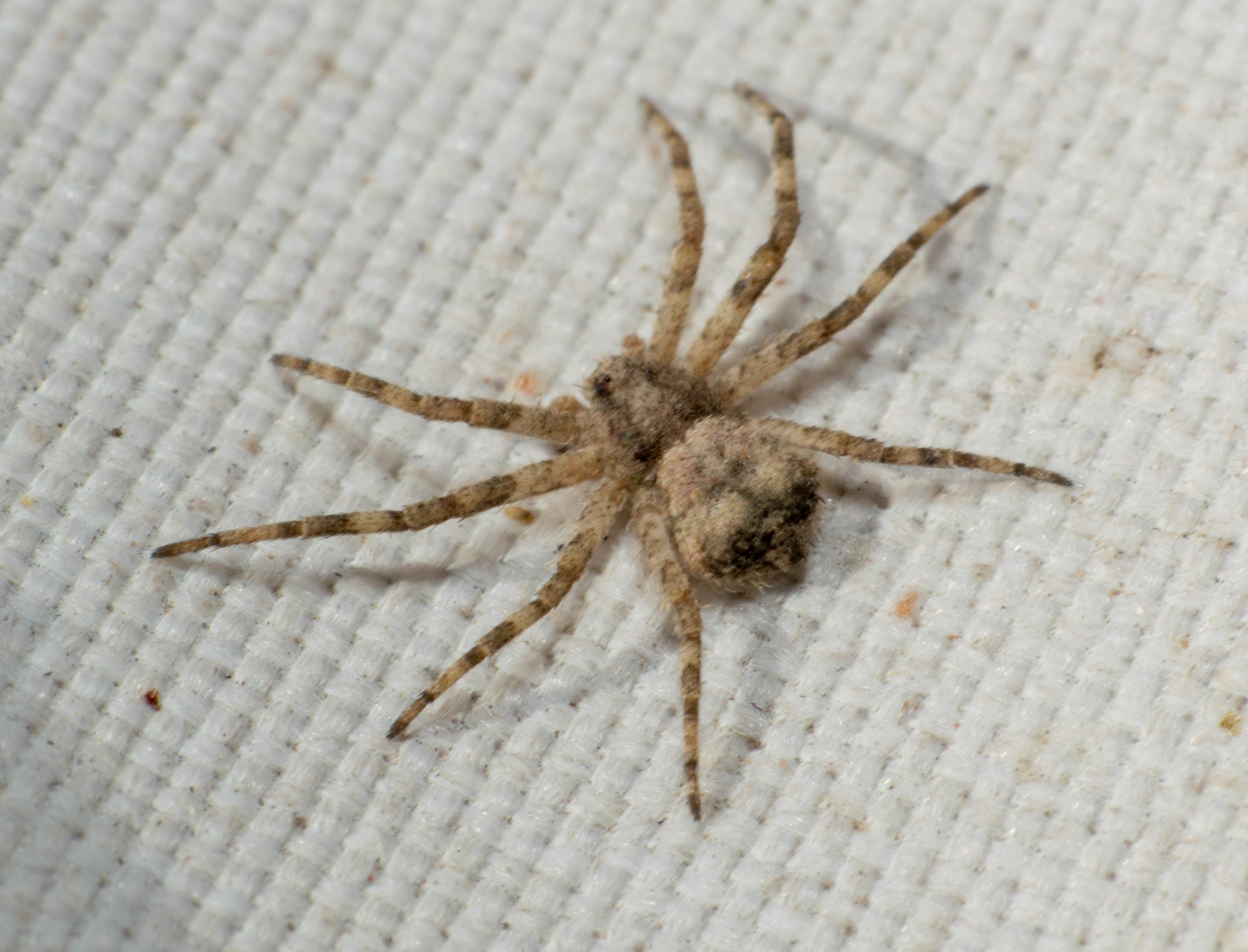
- Fageia moschata

Scientific classification
- Kingdom: Animalia
- Phylum: Arthropoda
- Subphylum: Chelicerata
- Class: Arachnida
- Order: Araneae
- Infraorder: Araneomorphae
- Family: Philodromidae
- Genus: Fageia; Mello-Leitão, 1929

Type species
- F. amabilis Mello-Leitão, 1929

Species
- 6, see text

= Fageia =

Genus of spiders

Fageia is a genus of running crab spiders that was first described by Cândido Firmino de Mello-Leitão in 1929.

== Species ==
As of September 2022 it contains six species, found only in Brazil and Argentina:

- Fageia amabilis Mello-Leitão, 1929 (type) – Brazil
- Fageia clara Mello-Leitão, 1937 – Brazil
- Fageia concolor Mello-Leitão, 1947 – Brazil
- Fageia meridionalis Mello-Leitão, 1943 – Brazil
- Fageia moschata Mello-Leitão, 1943 – Brazil
- Fageia rosea Mello-Leitão, 1944 – Argentina
