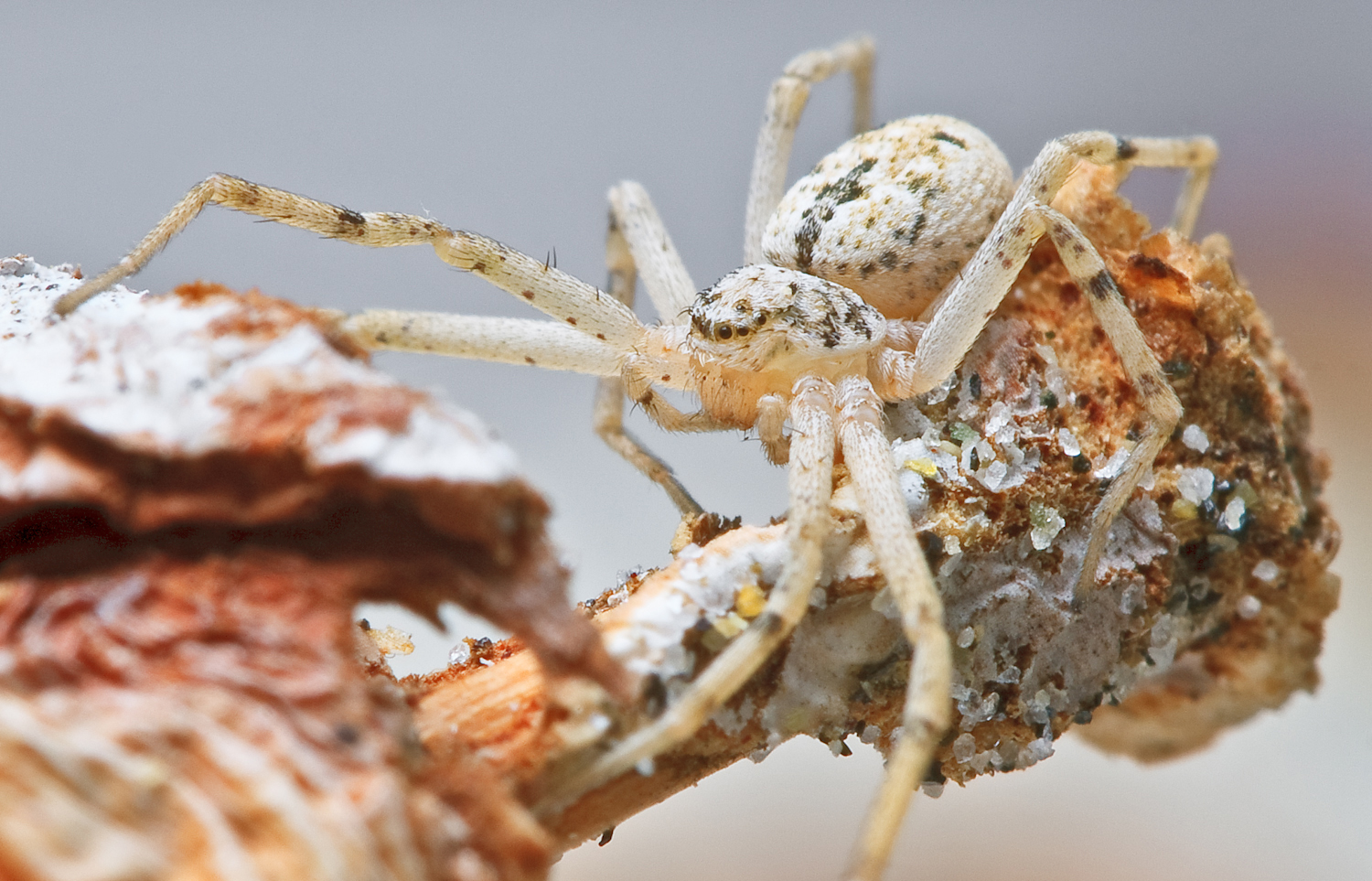
- Female Ebo pepinensis

Scientific classification
- Kingdom: Animalia
- Phylum: Arthropoda
- Subphylum: Chelicerata
- Class: Arachnida
- Order: Araneae
- Infraorder: Araneomorphae
- Family: Philodromidae
- Genus: Ebo; Keyserling, 1884

Type species
- E. latithorax Keyserling, 1884

Species
- 13, see text

= Ebo (spider) =

Genus of spiders

Ebo is a genus of running crab spiders that was first described by Eugen von Keyserling in 1884.

== Species ==
As of June 2019 it contains thirteen species, found only in North America, Asia, and Argentina:

- Ebo bharatae Tikader, 1965 – India (mainland, Andaman Is.)
- Ebo bucklei Platnick, 1972 – Canada
- Ebo carmineus Mello-Leitão, 1944 – Argentina
- Ebo contrastus Sauer & Platnick, 1972 – USA
- Ebo distinctivus Lyakhov, 1992 – Kazakhstan, Russia (South Siberia)
- Ebo evansae Sauer & Platnick, 1972 – USA, Mexico
- Ebo fuscus Mello-Leitão, 1943 – Argentina
- Ebo iviei Sauer & Platnick, 1972 – USA, Canada
- Ebo latithorax Keyserling, 1884 (type) – USA, Canada
- Ebo meridionalis Mello-Leitão, 1942 – Argentina
- Ebo merkeli Schick, 1965 – USA
- Ebo pepinensis Gertsch, 1933 – USA, Canada
- Ebo punctatus Sauer & Platnick, 1972 – USA
