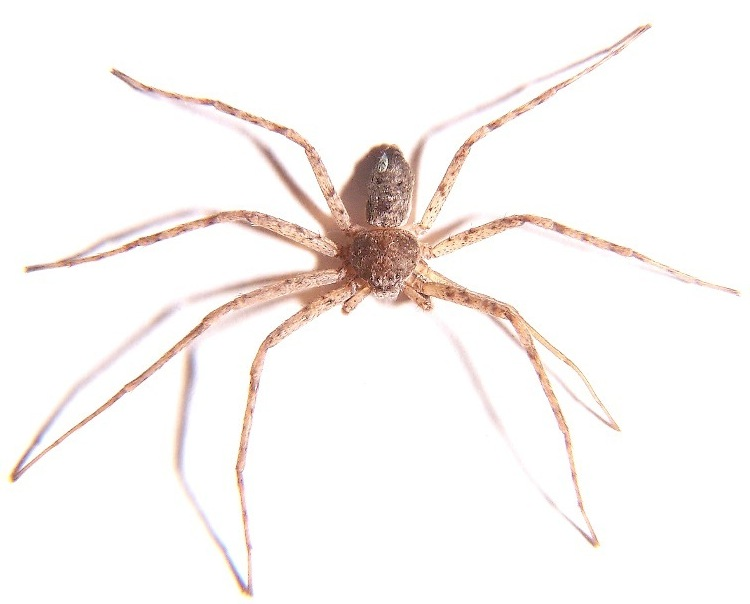
- Philodromus sp.
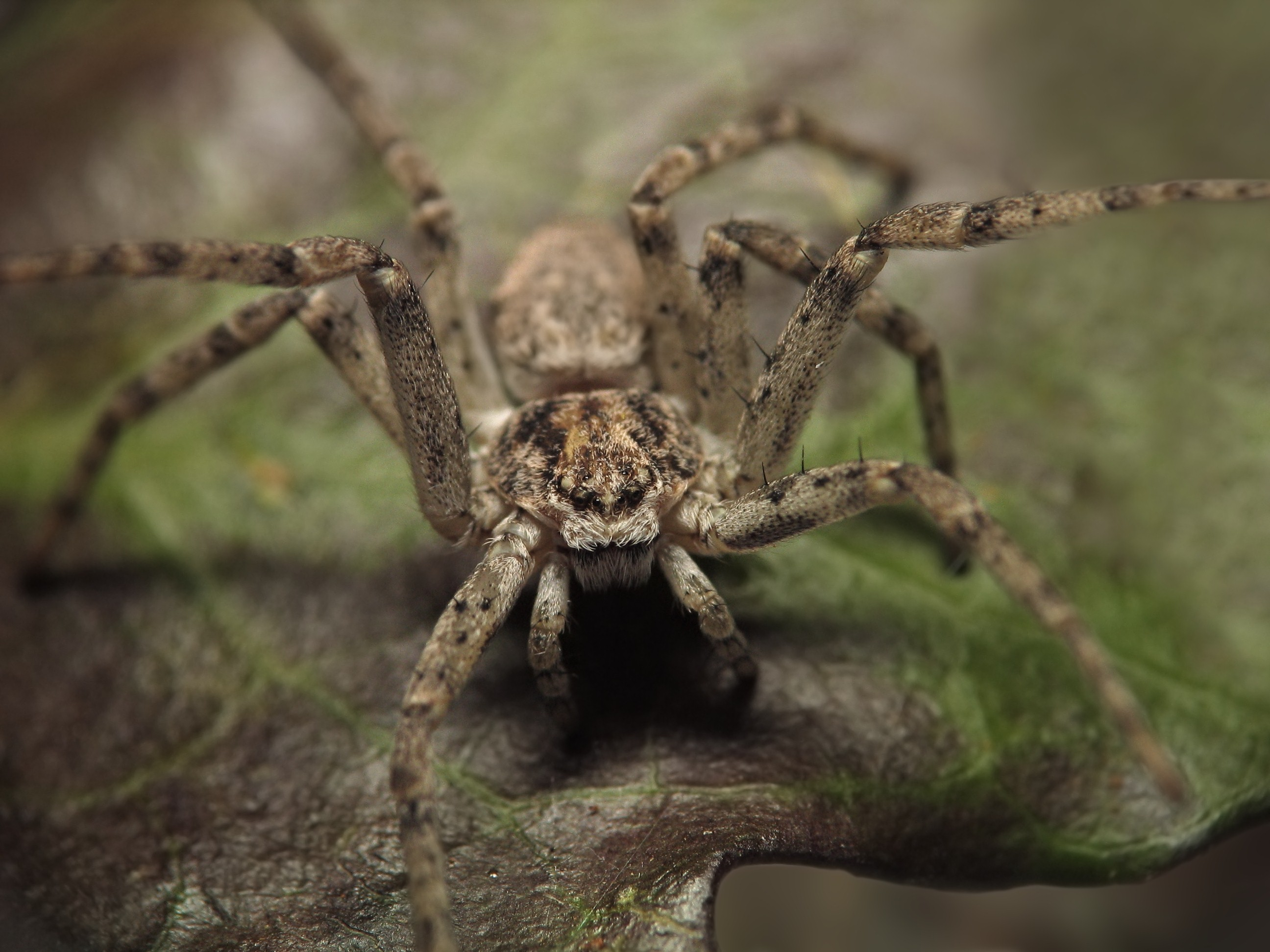
- Running crab spider

Scientific classification
- Kingdom: Animalia
- Phylum: Arthropoda
- Subphylum: Chelicerata
- Class: Arachnida
- Order: Araneae
- Infraorder: Araneomorphae
- Family: Philodromidae; Thorell, 1870

Diversity
- 31 genera, 531 species
- blue: reported countries (WSC) green: observation hotspots (iNaturalist)

= Philodromidae =

Running crab spiders Temporal range: Cretaceous–present

Family of spiders

Philodromidae, also known as philodromid crab spiders and running crab spiders, is a family of araneomorph spiders first described by Tord Tamerlan Teodor Thorell in 1870 (then known as subfamily Philodrominae within Thomisidae). It contains over 500 species in about thirty genera.

The most common genus is Philodromus which is widespread, similar to Ebo. Other common genera include the elongate grass-dwelling Tibellus and the widespread Thanatus, which includes the house crab spider that commonly captures flies on and in buildings.

== Description ==
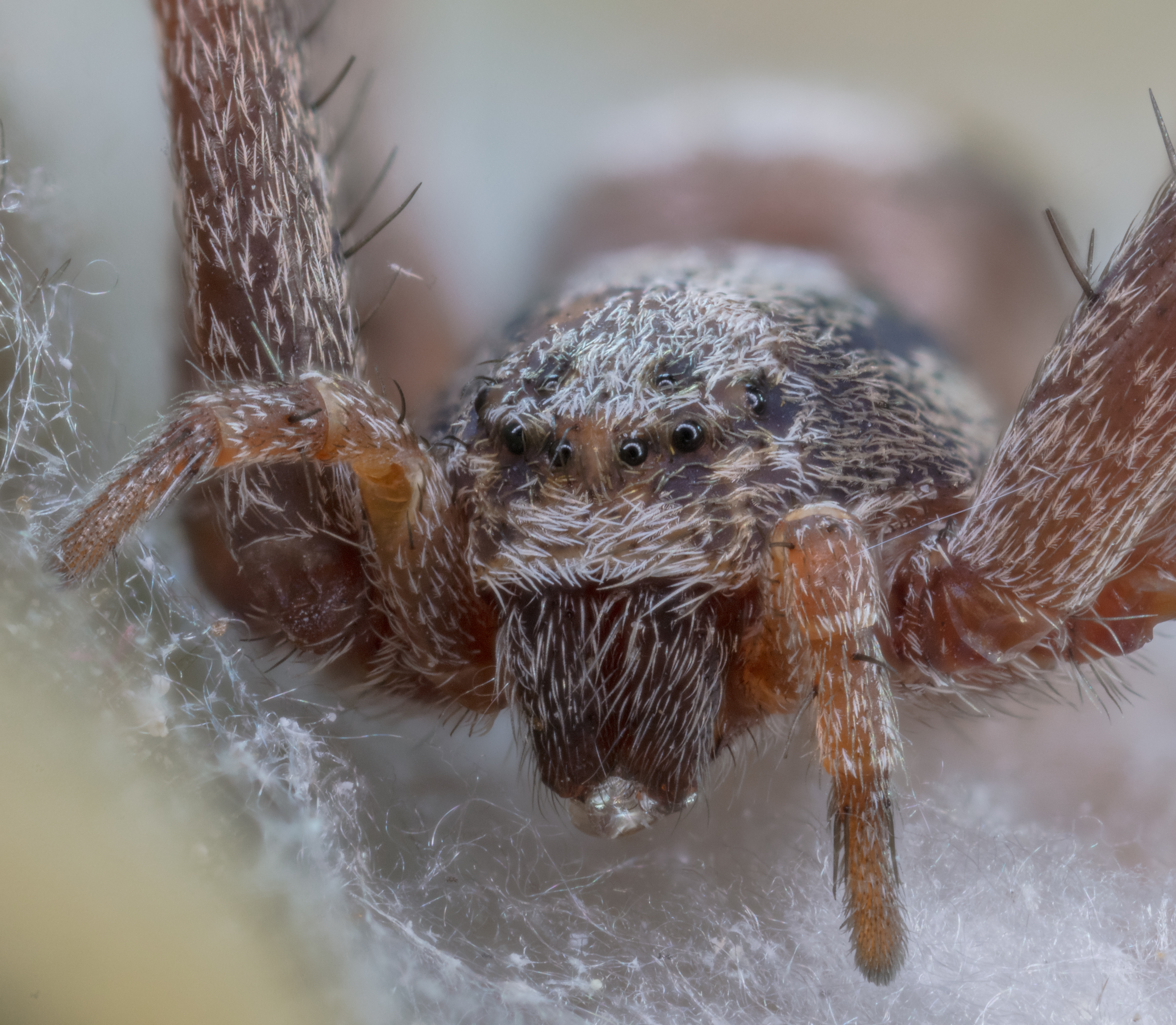
P. aureus

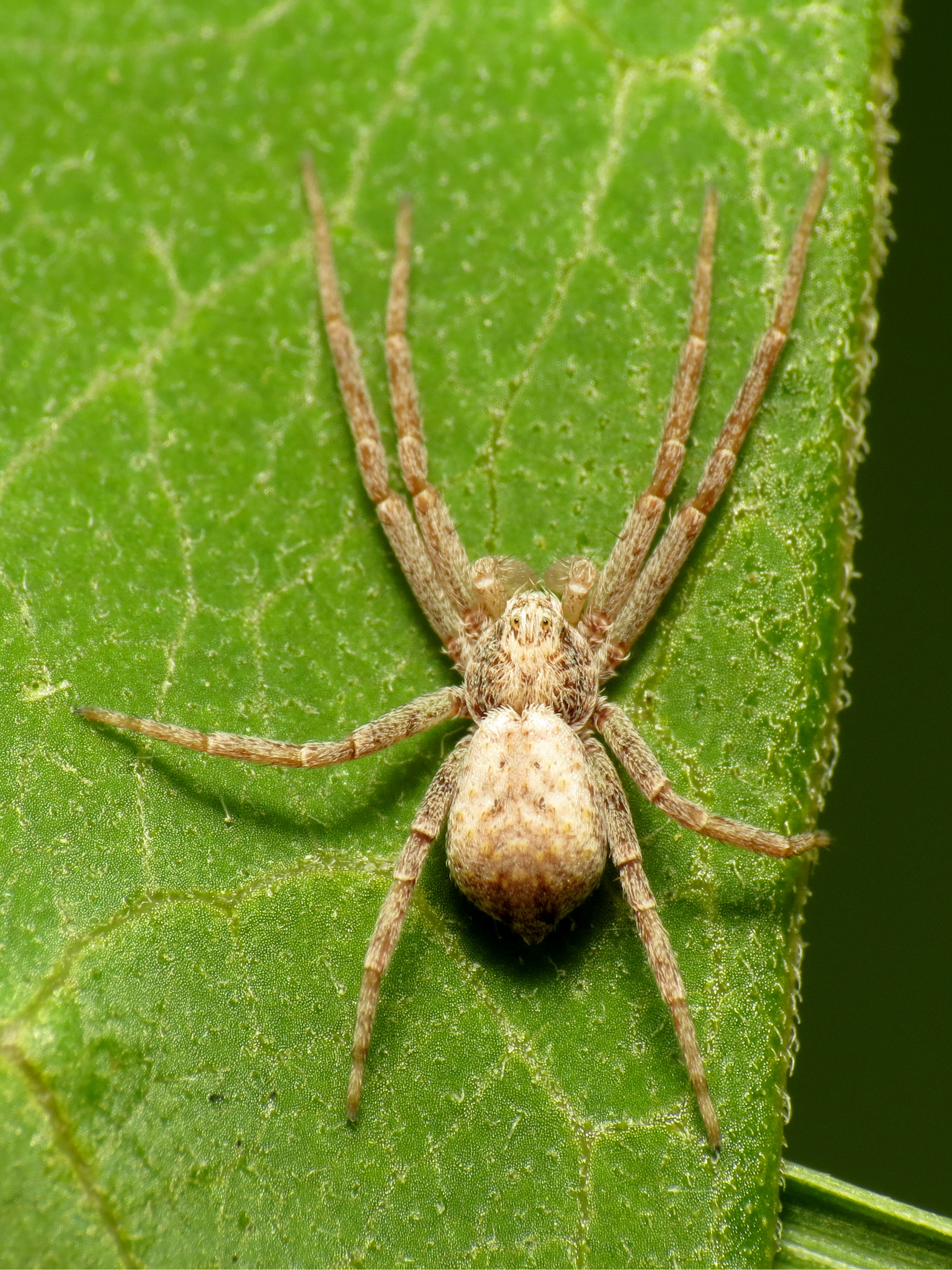
Philodromid in Washington, USA

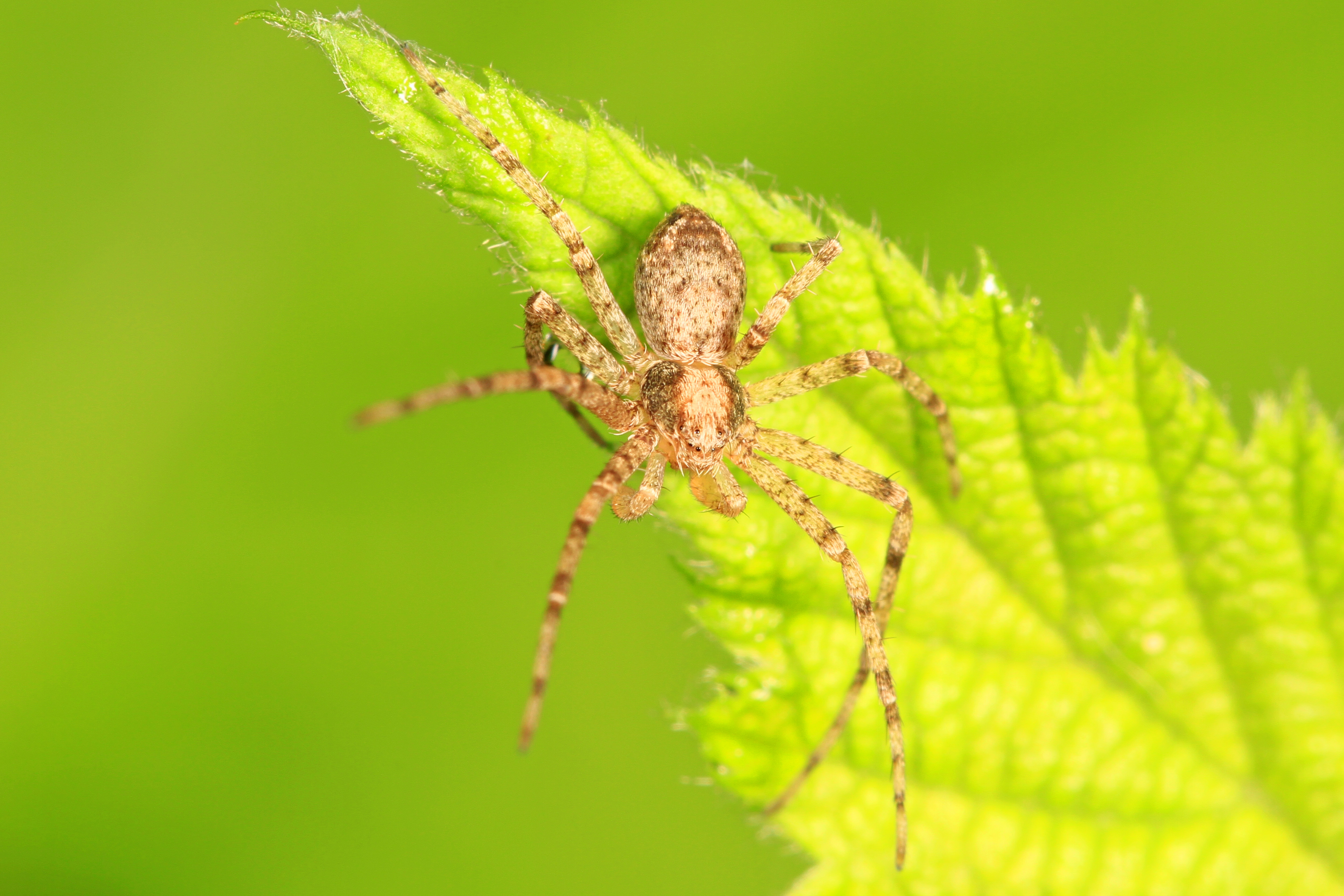
Philodromus sp. from Maryland, USA

Philodromids have a crab-like shape due to the first two pairs of legs being oriented sideways (laterigrade). This is superficially similar to the "true" crab spiders (Thomisidae), such as Misumena vatia, but these families are not as closely related as previously thought.

Unlike crab spiders, the legs are generally similar in size, though the second leg pair may be significantly longer than the first pair. This is most evident in Ebo, where the second pair of legs are twice as long as the first pair in some species.

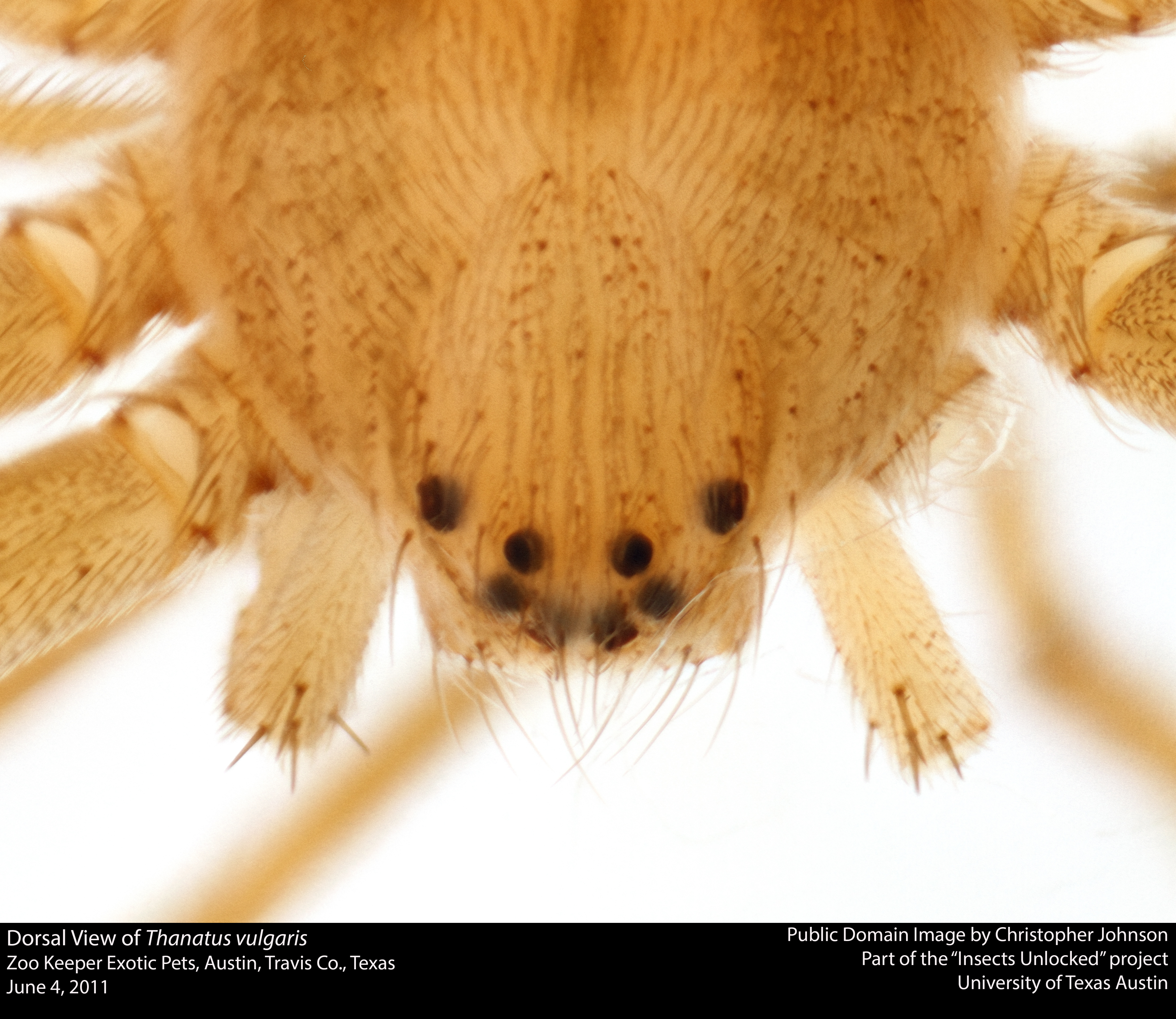
Thanatus vulgaris

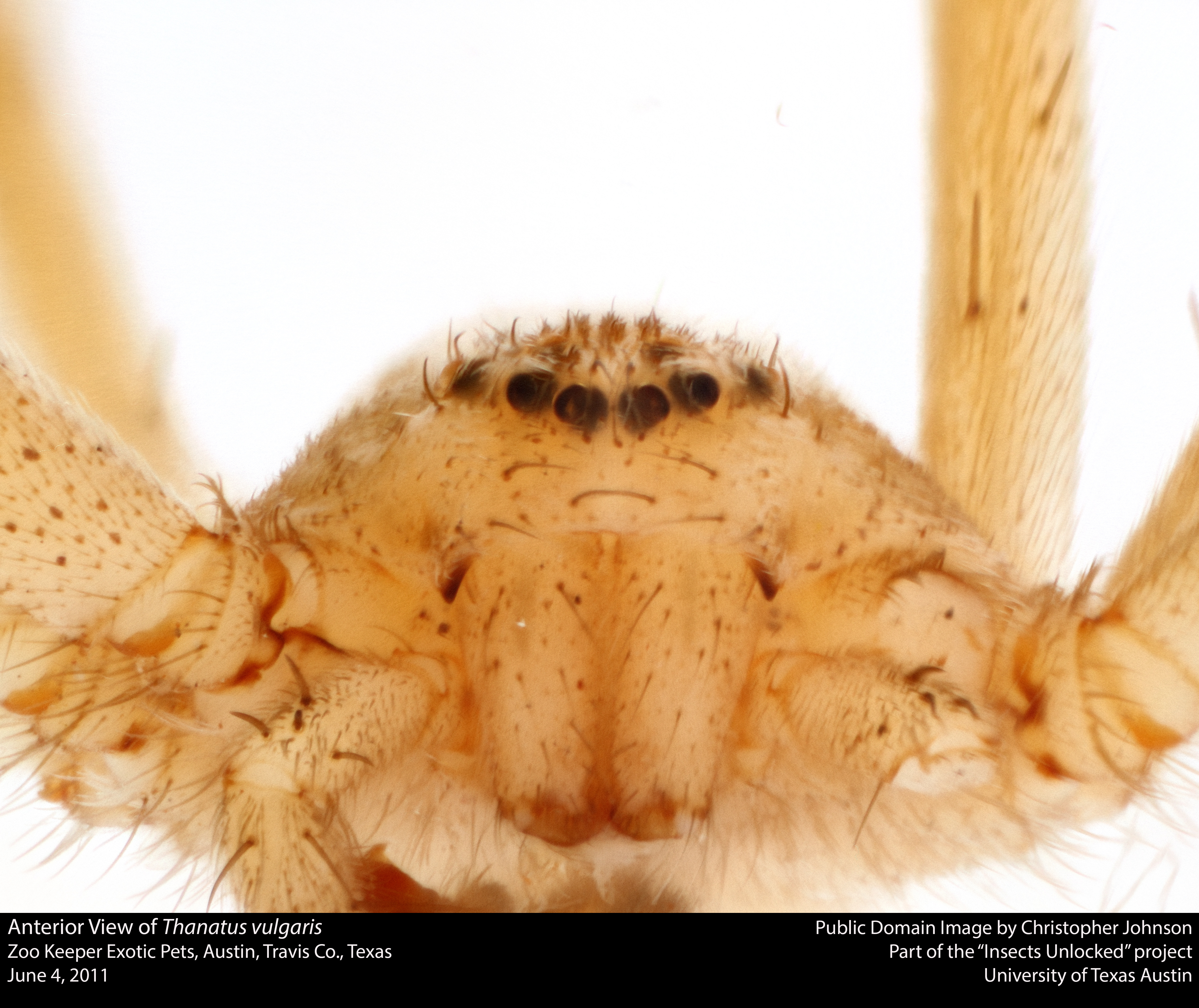

Philodromids have scopula only at the tips of the tarsi (unlike sparassids) and the eyes are in two curved rows with the posterior row wider than the anterior row. In terms of colouration, they are usually cream to light brown and have faint longitudinal stripes.

== Ecology ==
Philodromidae are active predators and often occur on the stems and leaves of plants. Some occur only on deciduous trees and others only on conifers. A small number of species live in deserts. Instead of building webs to catch prey, they hunt by ambush.

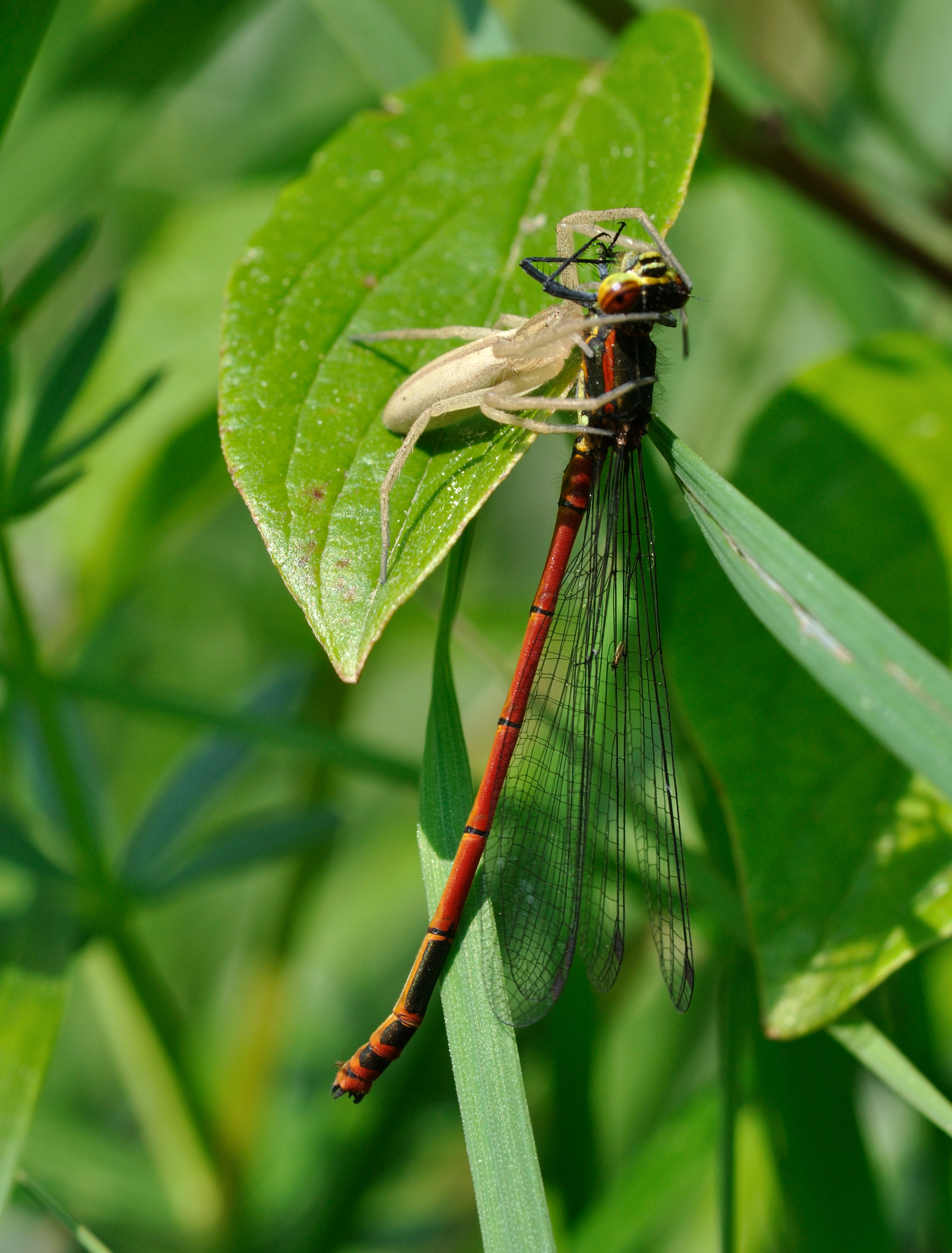
Tibellus oblongus with damselfly prey

== Genera ==
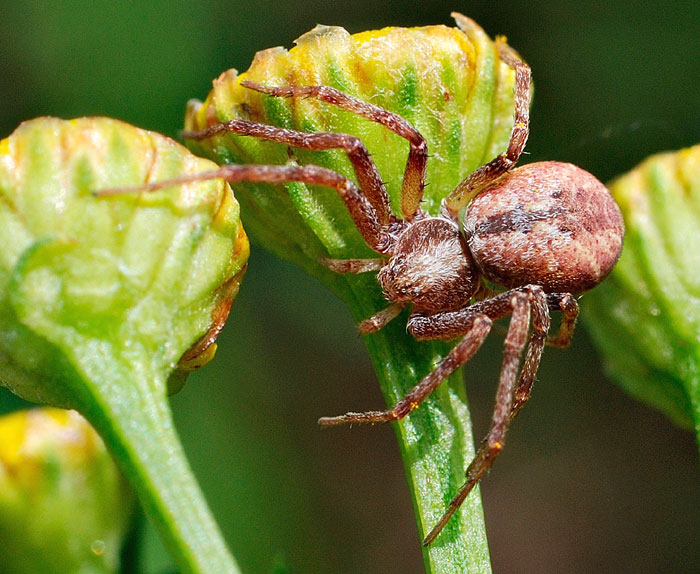
Philodromus cespitum

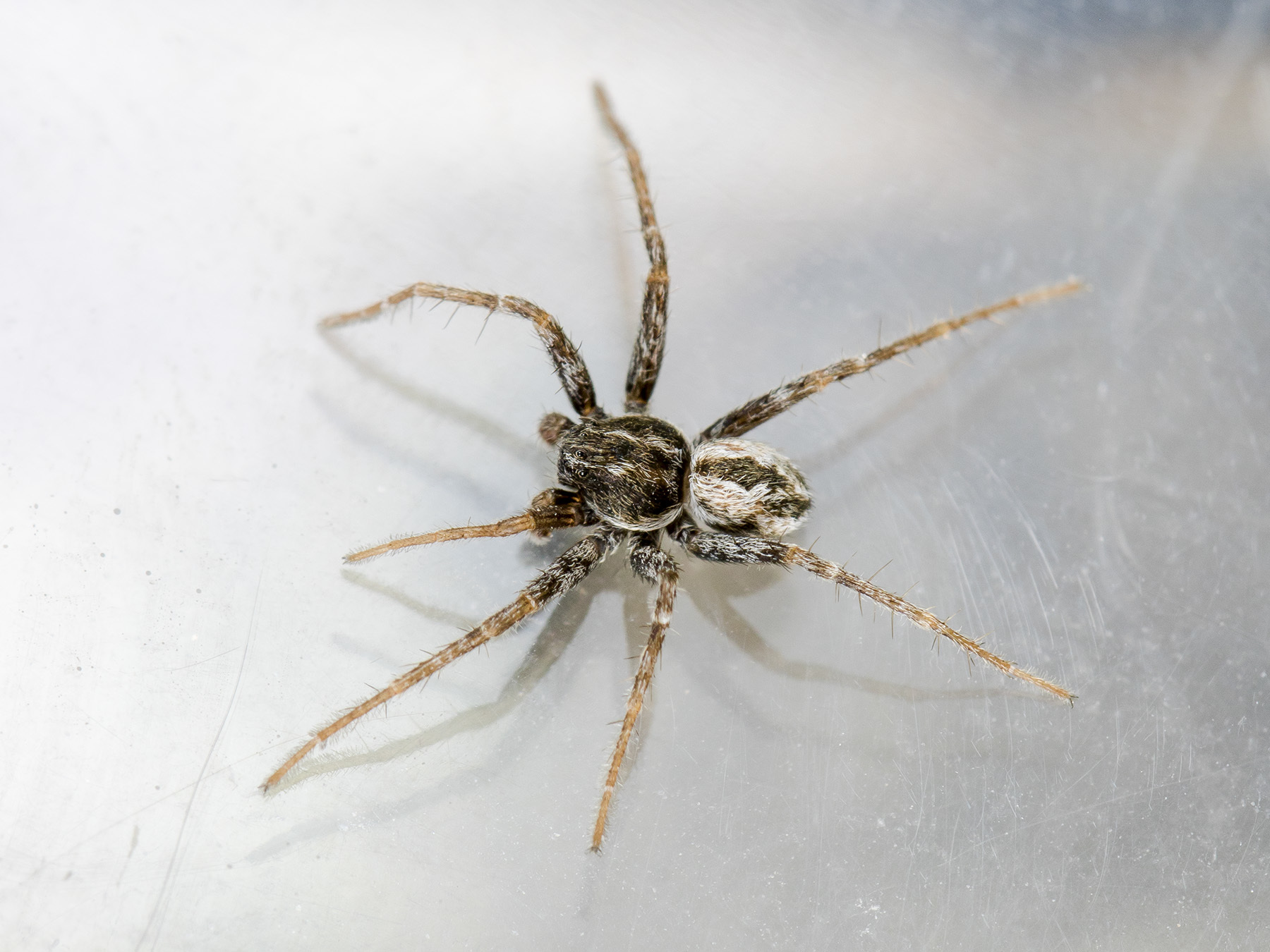
Thanatus atratus

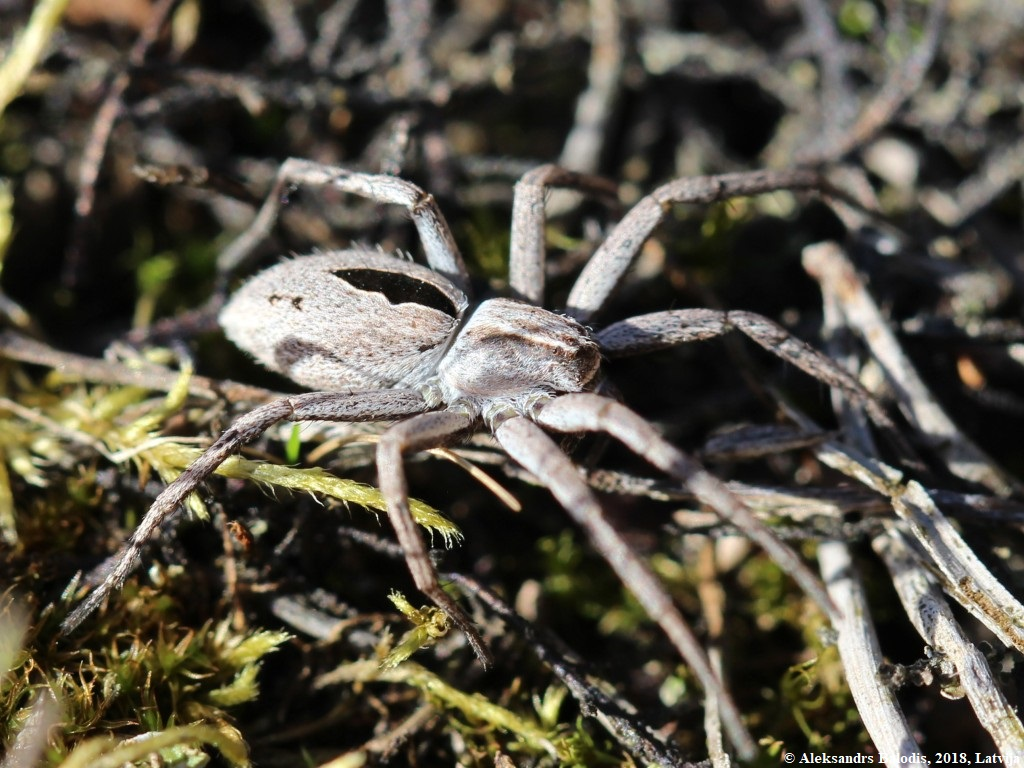
Thanatus formicinus

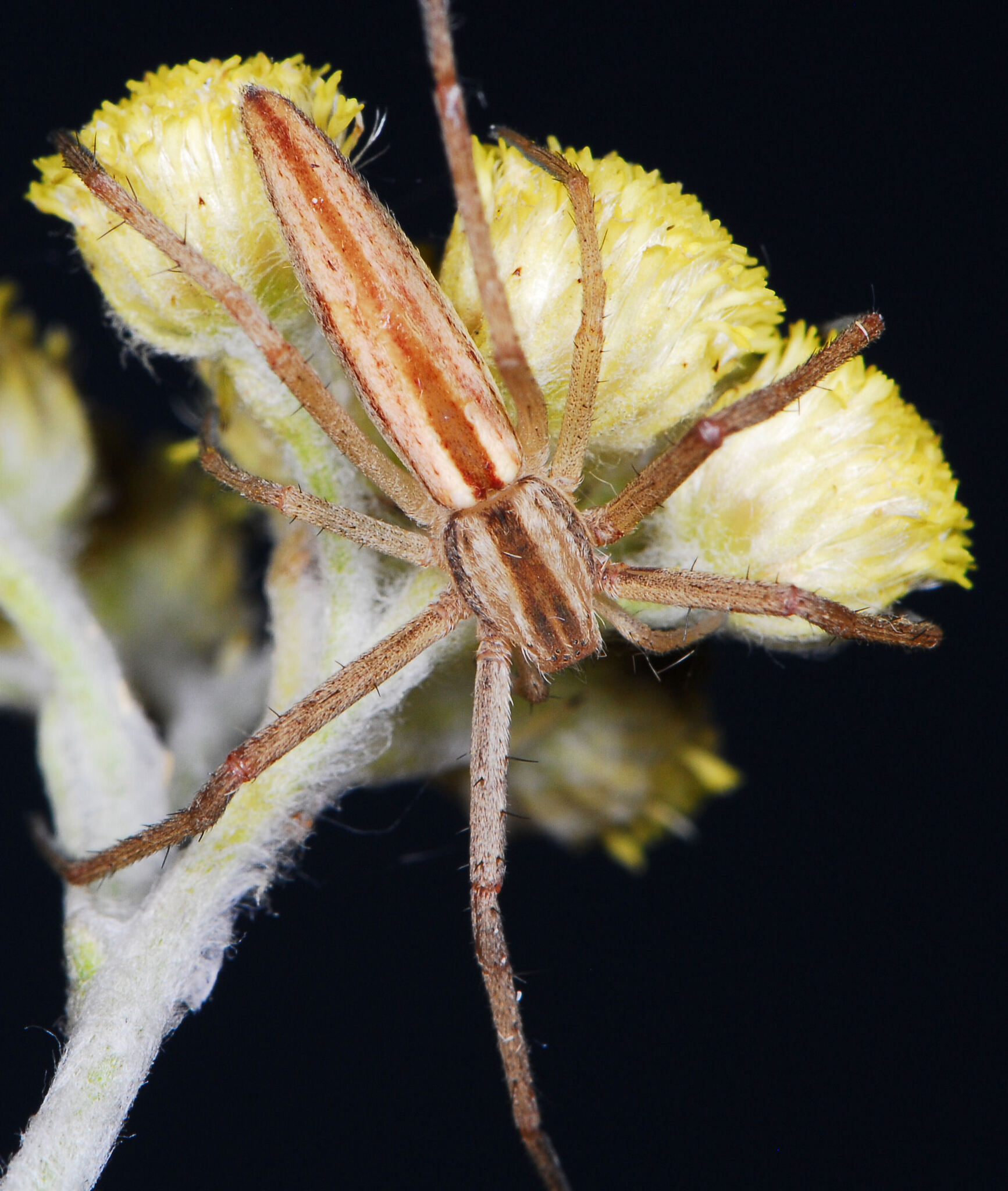
Tibellus hollidayi

As of January 2026, this family includes 31 genera and 531 species:

- Apollophanes O. Pickard-Cambridge, 1898 – China, Korea, Russia, North to South America
- Celerrimus Lecigne, Cornic, Oger & Van Keer, 2019 – Spain, France
- Cleocnemis Simon, 1886 – Argentina, Brazil
- Ebo Keyserling, 1884 – India, Kazakhstan, Russia, North America, Argentina
- Emargidromus Wunderlich, 2012 – Asia, Russia, Portugal
- Eminella Özdikmen, 2007 – Argentina
- Fageia Mello-Leitão, 1929 – Panama, South America
- Gephyrellula Strand, 1932 – South America
- Gephyrina Simon, 1895 – St. Vincent, Bolivia, Brazil, Venezuela
- Gephyrota Strand, 1932 – Africa, Cambodia, Vietnam, India, Sri Lanka, Australia
- Halodromus Muster, 2009 – North Africa to Middle East, Western Asia, Canary Islands, Spain
- Hirriusa Strand, 1932 – Botswana, Namibia, South Africa
- Pagiopalus Simon, 1900 – Hawaii
- Paracleocnemis Schiapelli & Gerschman, 1942 – Argentina
- Pedinopistha Karsch, 1880 – Hawaii
- Petrichus Simon, 1886 – South America
- Philodromops Mello-Leitão, 1943 – Brazil
- Philodromus Walckenaer, 1826 – Worldwide
- Procleocnemis Mello-Leitão, 1929 – Brazil
- Psellonus Simon, 1897 – China, Philippines, India
- Pseudopsellonus Balogh, 1936 – New Guinea
- Pulchellodromus Wunderlich, 2012 – Mediterranean to Kazakhstan, Iran, Tibet
- Rhysodromus Schick, 1965 – Egypt, Cape Verde, St. Helena, Asia, Canary Islands, Russia, Greece, North America, Central Asia to China, Mediterranean to India, North Africa
- Sinodromus Yao & Liu, 2024 – China
- Suemus Simon, 1895 – Mozambique, Eswatini, South Africa, Zimbabwe, Sierra Leone, Vietnam, East Africa
- Thanatus C. L. Koch, 1837 – Africa, Asia, Europe, North America, Peru, East Africa, Europe to Kazakhstan, North Africa. Introduced to South Africa, Australia
- Tibelloides Mello-Leitão, 1939 – South America
- Tibellus Simon, 1875 – Africa, Asia, Moldova, Romania, Russia, Italy, France, Cuba, North America, Australia, Argentina, Chile, North Africa, Sub-Saharan Africa
- Tibitanus Simon, 1907 – Namibia, South Africa, Guinea, Guinea-Bissau
- Titanebo Gertsch, 1933 – North America
- Vacchellia Caporiacco, 1935 – Pakistan

=== Incertae sedis ===
- Euthanatus Petrunkevitch, 1950 † (fossil)
- Filiolella Petrunkevitch, 1955 † (fossil)
- Medela Petrunkevitch, 1942 † (fossil)
