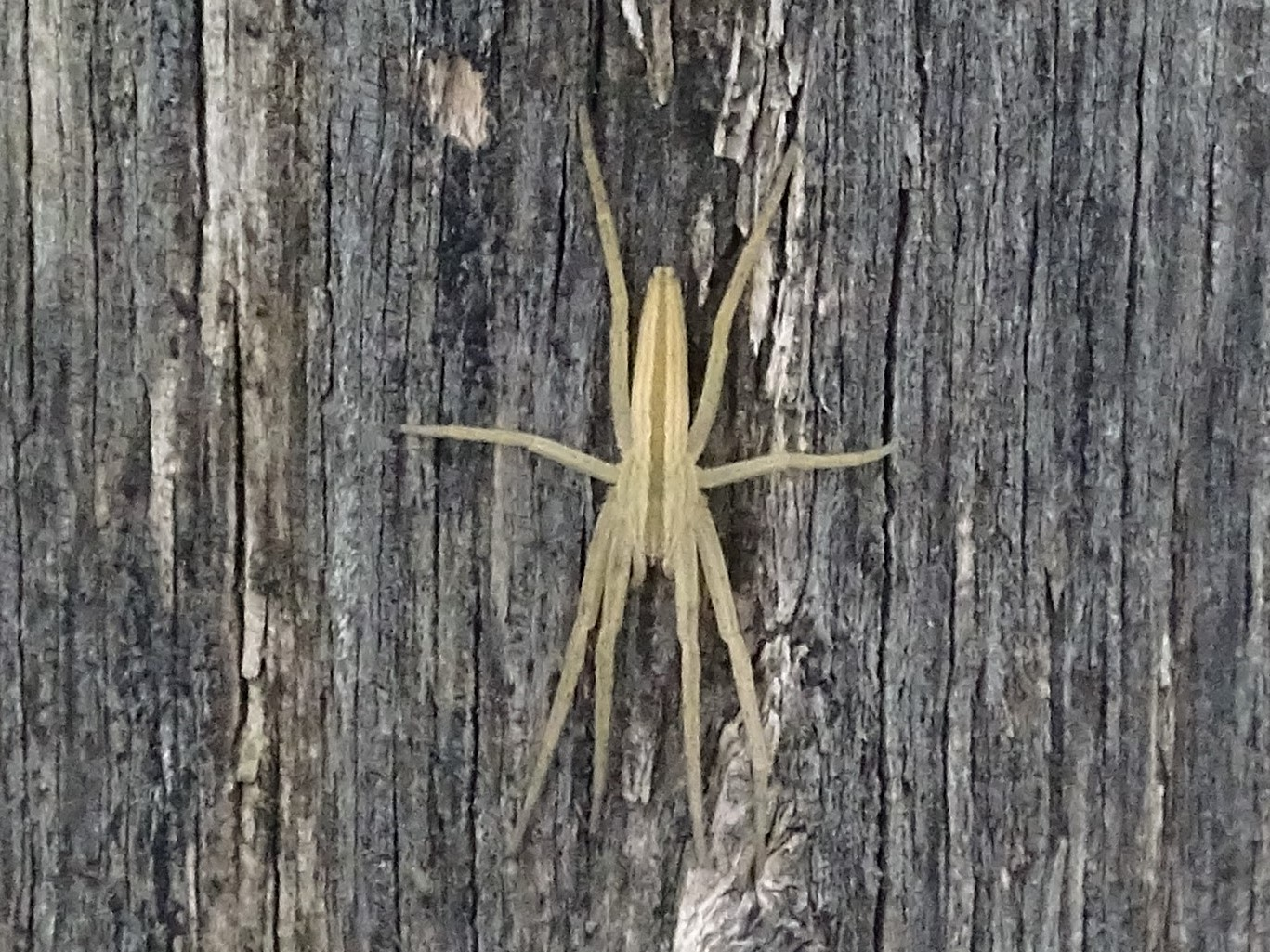
- In Ottawa, Canada

Scientific classification
- Domain: Eukaryota
- Kingdom: Animalia
- Phylum: Arthropoda
- Subphylum: Chelicerata
- Class: Arachnida
- Order: Araneae
- Infraorder: Araneomorphae
- Family: Philodromidae
- Genus: Tibellus
- Species: T. maritimus

Binomial name
- Tibellus maritimus (Menge, 1875)

= Tibellus maritimus =

Species of spider

Tibellus maritimus is a species of running crab spider in the family Philodromidae. It is found in North America, Europe, Caucasus, Russia, Central Asia, and China.

== Identification ==
Tibellus maritimus can be reliably distinguished from some similar species such as T. oblongus and T. asiaticus by the absence of two dark spots on the dorsal abdomen. T. maritimus is the only Tibellus in the Canadian portion of its range that does not have these spots.
