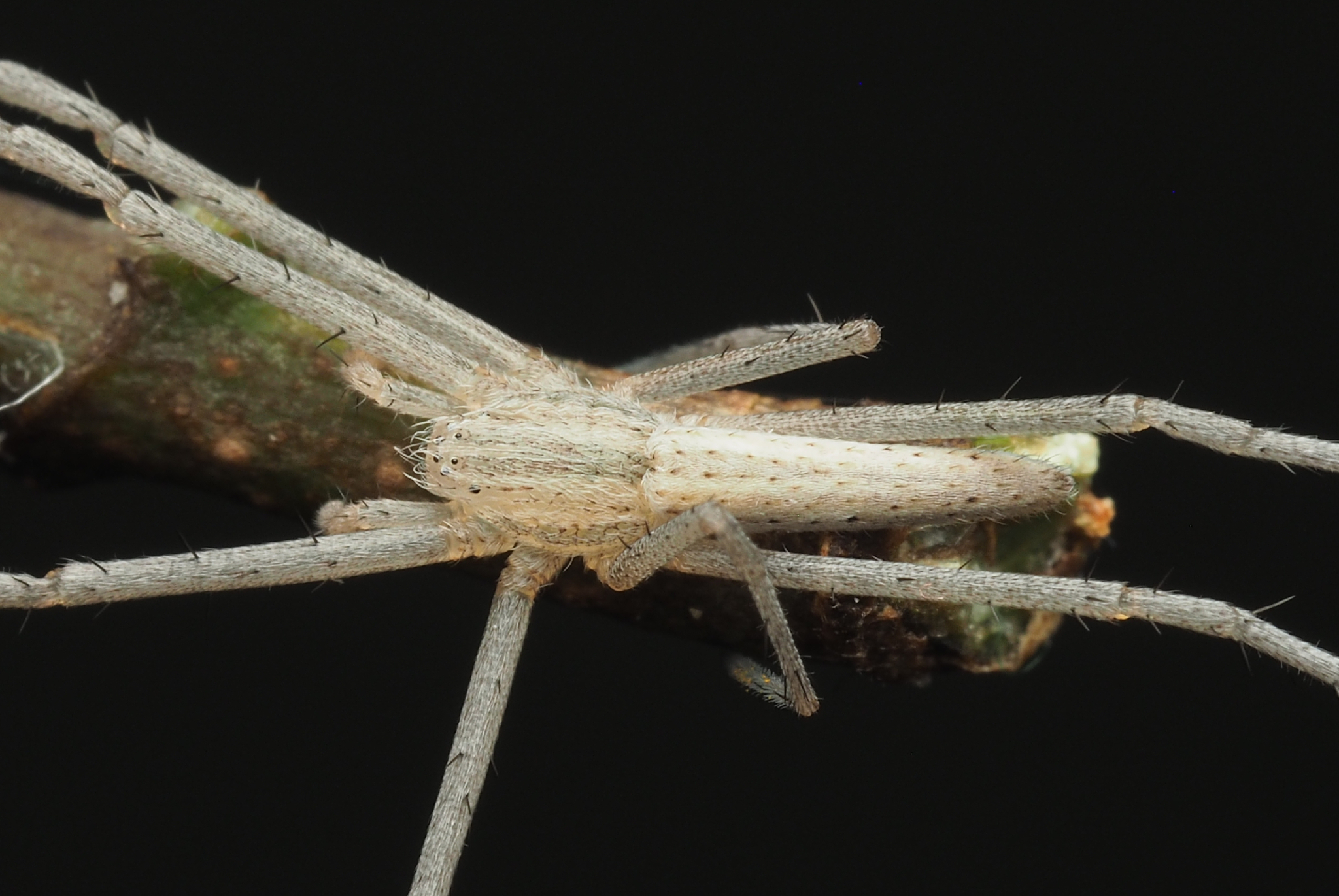
- specimen from Queensland

Scientific classification
- Kingdom: Animalia
- Phylum: Arthropoda
- Subphylum: Chelicerata
- Class: Arachnida
- Order: Araneae
- Infraorder: Araneomorphae
- Family: Philodromidae
- Genus: Tibellus
- Species: T. tenellus

Binomial name
- Tibellus tenellus (L. Koch, 1876)

Synonyms
- Thanatus tenellus L. Koch, 1876

= Tibellus tenellus =

Stretched Philodromid

Species of spider

Tibellus tenellus is a species of running crab spider in the family Philodromidae. It is endemic to Australia, specifically known from Queensland.

== Taxonomy ==
The species was originally described as Thanatus tenellus by Ludwig Carl Christian Koch in 1876 based on a female specimen collected from Peak Downs, Queensland. It was later transferred to the genus Tibellus and is currently classified in the family Philodromidae (running crab spiders).

Many records of T. tenellus from Asia have been determined to be misidentifications of other species in the genus, particularly Tibellus japonicus and Tibellus orientis.

== Distribution ==
T. tenellus is endemic to Australia and has been recorded from Queensland. The holotype was collected from Peak Downs, a region in central Queensland located in what is now the Central Highlands Region.

== Description ==
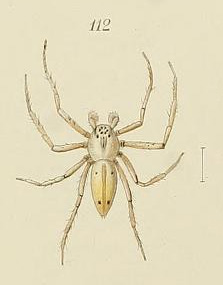
Drawing of female from Bösenberg & Strand (1906)

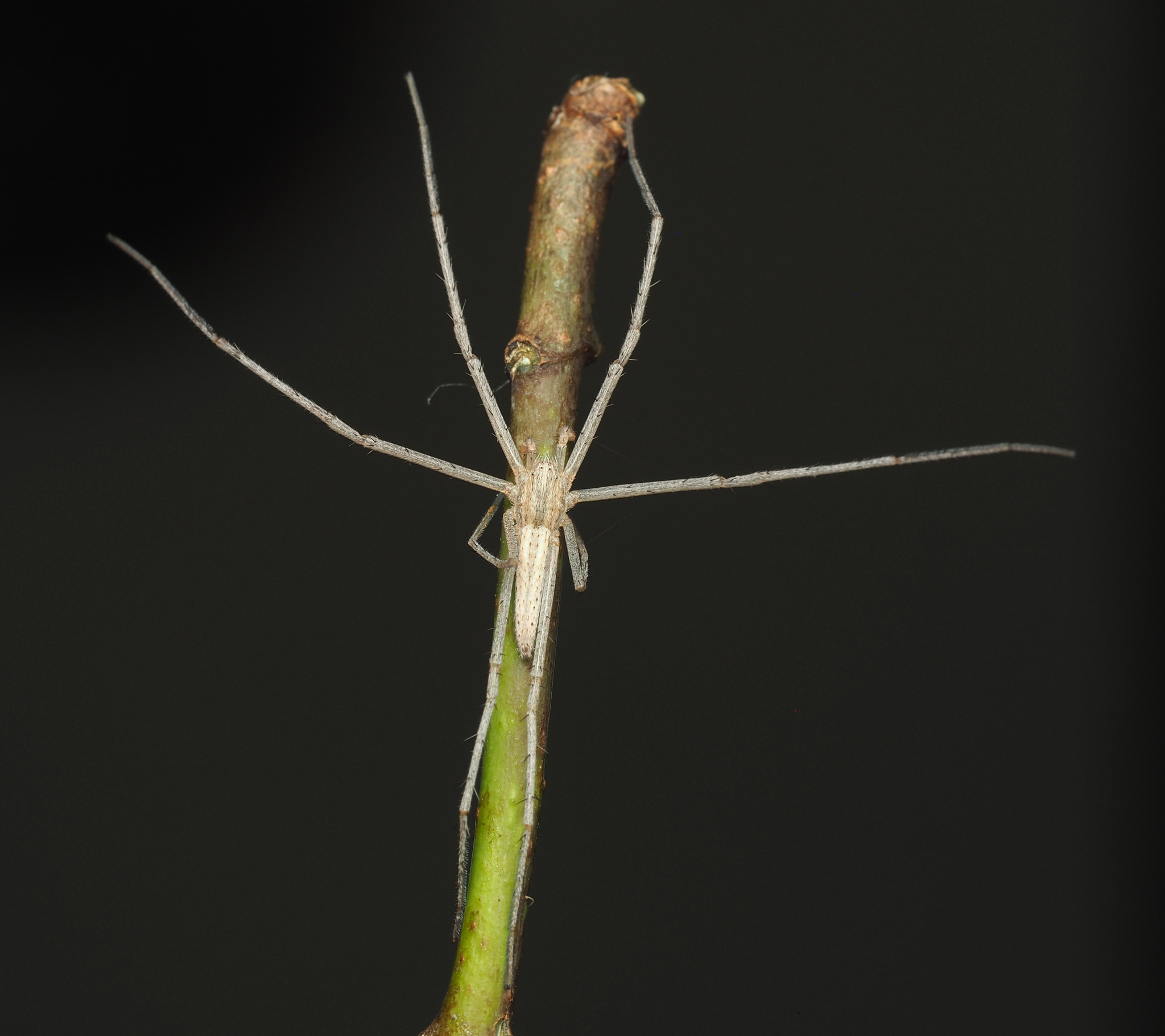
live specimen

The species is distinguished from the similar Tibellus oblongus by having a more elongated opisthosoma (approximately five times as long as wide) compared to T. oblongus which has a shorter abdomen (three times as long as wide). Females possess large spermathecae positioned on a wide base, with copulatory spermathecal gland ducts positioned in front of the spermathecae, whereas T. oblongus has smaller spermathecae on elongated bases with spermathecal gland ducts positioned to the side.
