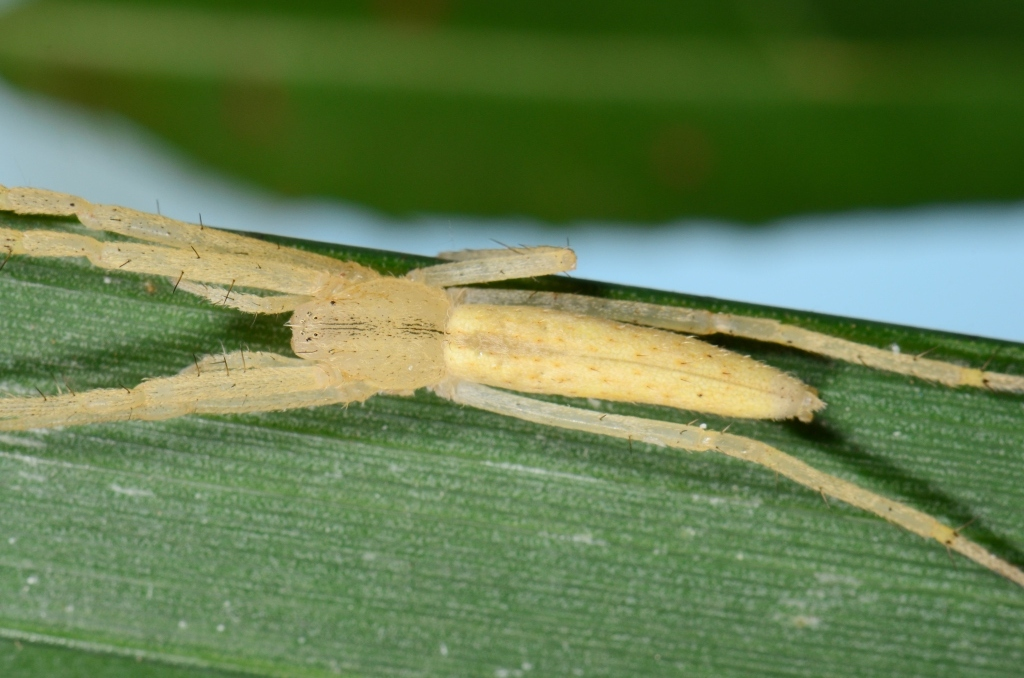
- female
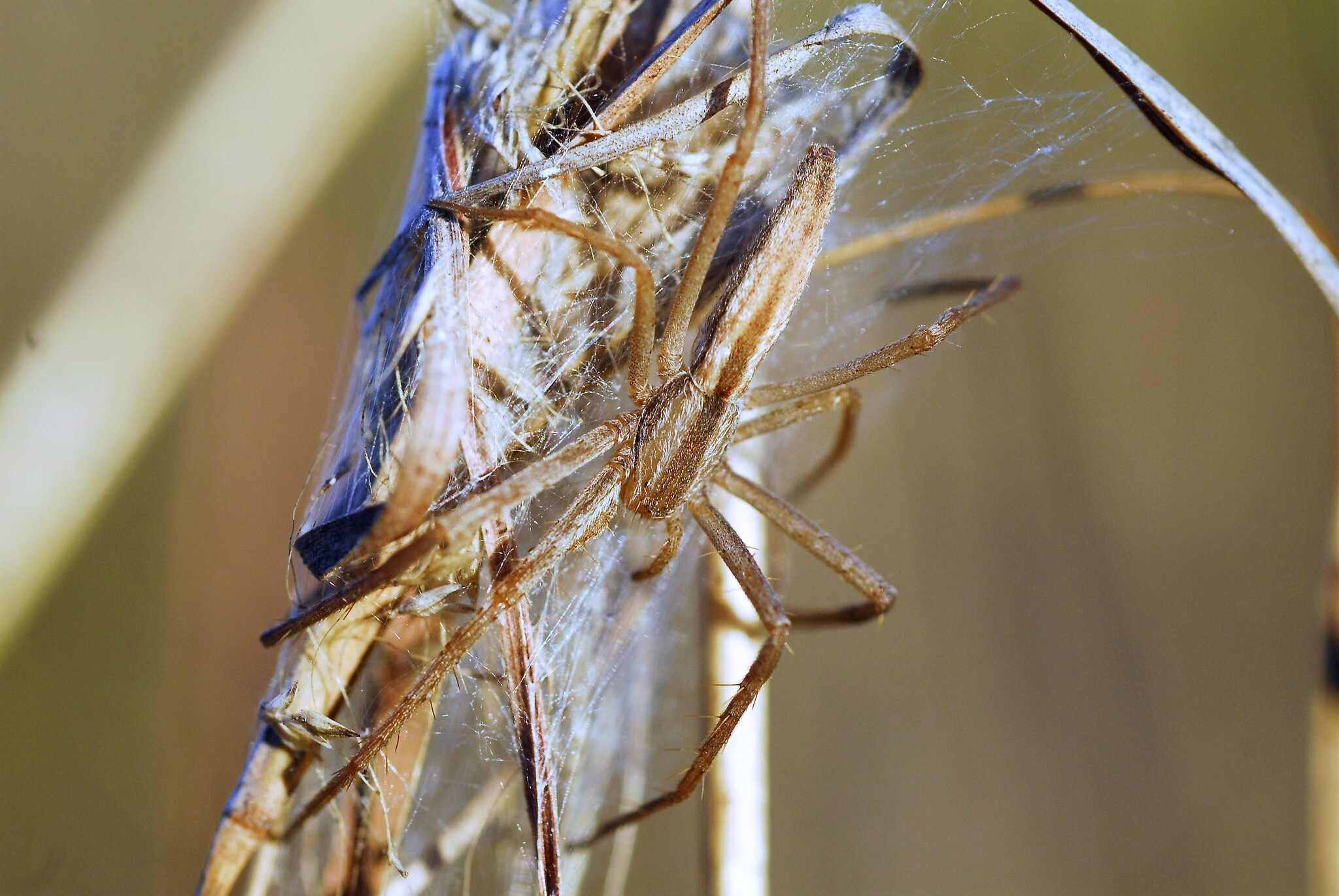
- female

Scientific classification
- Kingdom: Animalia
- Phylum: Arthropoda
- Subphylum: Chelicerata
- Class: Arachnida
- Order: Araneae
- Infraorder: Araneomorphae
- Family: Philodromidae
- Genus: Tibellus
- Species: T. minor

Binomial name
- Tibellus minor Lessert, 1919

Synonyms
- Tibellus vossioni minor Lessert, 1919

= Tibellus minor =

Common Grass Running Spider

Species of spider

Tibellus minor is a species of spider in the family Philodromidae. It is found throughout sub-Saharan Africa and is commonly known as the common grass running spider.

== Distribution ==
Tibellus minor is an African species with a wide distribution throughout Africa. In South Africa, the species is known from eight provinces including more than ten protected areas.

== Habitat and ecology ==
The species inhabits Fynbos, Grassland, Indian Ocean Coastal Belt, Nama Karoo, Savanna, Succulent Karoo and Thicket biomes, occurring at altitudes ranging from 7 to 2,020 m above sea level. Tibellus minor are free-living plant dwellers commonly found on bushes and tall grass. The species has also been sampled from crops such as cotton, maize and vineyards.

== Description ==
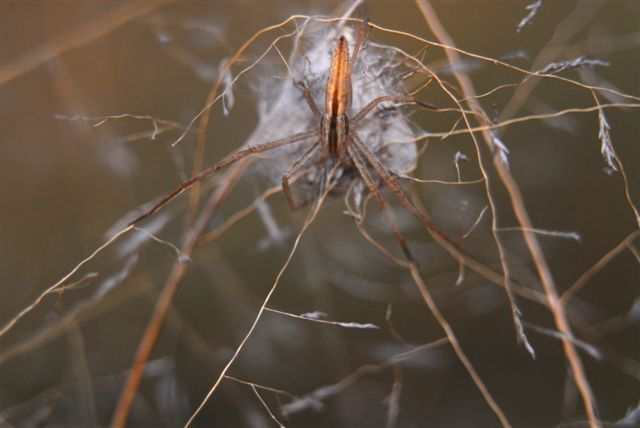
female

== Conservation ==
Tibellus minor is listed as Least Concern by the South African National Biodiversity Institute due to its wide geographical range. The species is protected in more than ten protected areas and there are no obvious threats.

== Taxonomy ==
The species was originally described by Roger de Lessert in 1919 from Tanzania as a subspecies of Tibellus vossioni. It was elevated to species status by Van den Berg and Dippenaar-Schoeman in 1994.
