= Tibellus sunetae =

Sunet's Grass Running Spider

Conservation status
- Least Concern (SANBI Red List)

Scientific classification
- Kingdom: Animalia
- Phylum: Arthropoda
- Subphylum: Chelicerata
- Class: Arachnida
- Order: Araneae
- Infraorder: Araneomorphae
- Family: Philodromidae
- Genus: Tibellus
- Species: T. sunetae

Binomial name
- Tibellus sunetae Van den Berg & Dippenaar-Schoeman, 1994

Species of spider

Tibellus sunetae is a species of spider in the family Philodromidae. It is found in southern Africa and is commonly known as Sunet's grass running spider.

== Distribution ==
Tibellus sunetae is a southern African species known from Mozambique, Zimbabwe, and South Africa. In South Africa, the species is known from three provinces including four protected areas.

== Habitat and ecology ==
The species inhabits the Savanna biome, occurring at altitudes ranging from 47 to 1,412 m above sea level. Tibellus sunetae are free-living plant dwellers commonly found on bushes and tall grass.

== Description ==
Tibellus sunetae is known from both sexes.

== Conservation ==
Tibellus sunetae is listed as Least Concern by the South African National Biodiversity Institute due to its wide geographical range. The species is protected in three reserves including Ndumo Game Reserve, Tembe Elephant Park, and Lhuvhondo Nature Reserve.

== Taxonomy ==
The species was described by Van den Berg and Dippenaar-Schoeman in 1994 from Ndumo Game Reserve in KwaZulu-Natal.
