= Tibellus armatus =

Central Africa Grass Running Spider

Conservation status
- Least Concern (SANBI Red List)

Scientific classification
- Kingdom: Animalia
- Phylum: Arthropoda
- Subphylum: Chelicerata
- Class: Arachnida
- Order: Araneae
- Infraorder: Araneomorphae
- Family: Philodromidae
- Genus: Tibellus
- Species: T. armatus

Binomial name
- Tibellus armatus Lessert, 1928

Species of spider

Tibellus armatus is a species of spider in the family Philodromidae. It is found in Africa and is commonly known as the Central Africa grass running spider.

== Distribution ==
Tibellus armatus is an African species with a wide distribution across six African countries: Democratic Republic of the Congo, Tanzania, Botswana, Zimbabwe, Mozambique, and South Africa. In South Africa, the species is known from KwaZulu-Natal and Free State provinces.

== Habitat and ecology ==
The species inhabits Forest, Indian Ocean Coastal Belt and Savanna biomes, occurring at altitudes ranging from 27 to 1,593 m above sea level. Tibellus armatus are free-living plant dwellers commonly found on bushes and tall grass.

== Description ==
Tibellus armatus is known from both sexes.

== Conservation ==
Tibellus armatus is listed as Least Concern by the South African National Biodiversity Institute due to its wide geographical range. There are no obvious threats to the species and no conservation actions are recommended.

== Taxonomy ==
The species was originally described by Roger de Lessert in 1928 from the Democratic Republic of the Congo as a subspecies of Tibellus vossioni. It was elevated to species status and revised by Van den Berg and Dippenaar-Schoeman in 1994.
