= Tibellus vitilis =

Scientific classification
- Kingdom: Animalia
- Phylum: Arthropoda
- Subphylum: Chelicerata
- Class: Arachnida
- Order: Araneae
- Infraorder: Araneomorphae
- Family: Philodromidae
- Genus: Tibellus
- Species: T. vitilis

Binomial name
- Tibellus vitilis Simon, 1906

Species of spider

Tibellus vitilis, is a species of spider of the genus Tibellus. It is found only in India and Sri Lanka.
