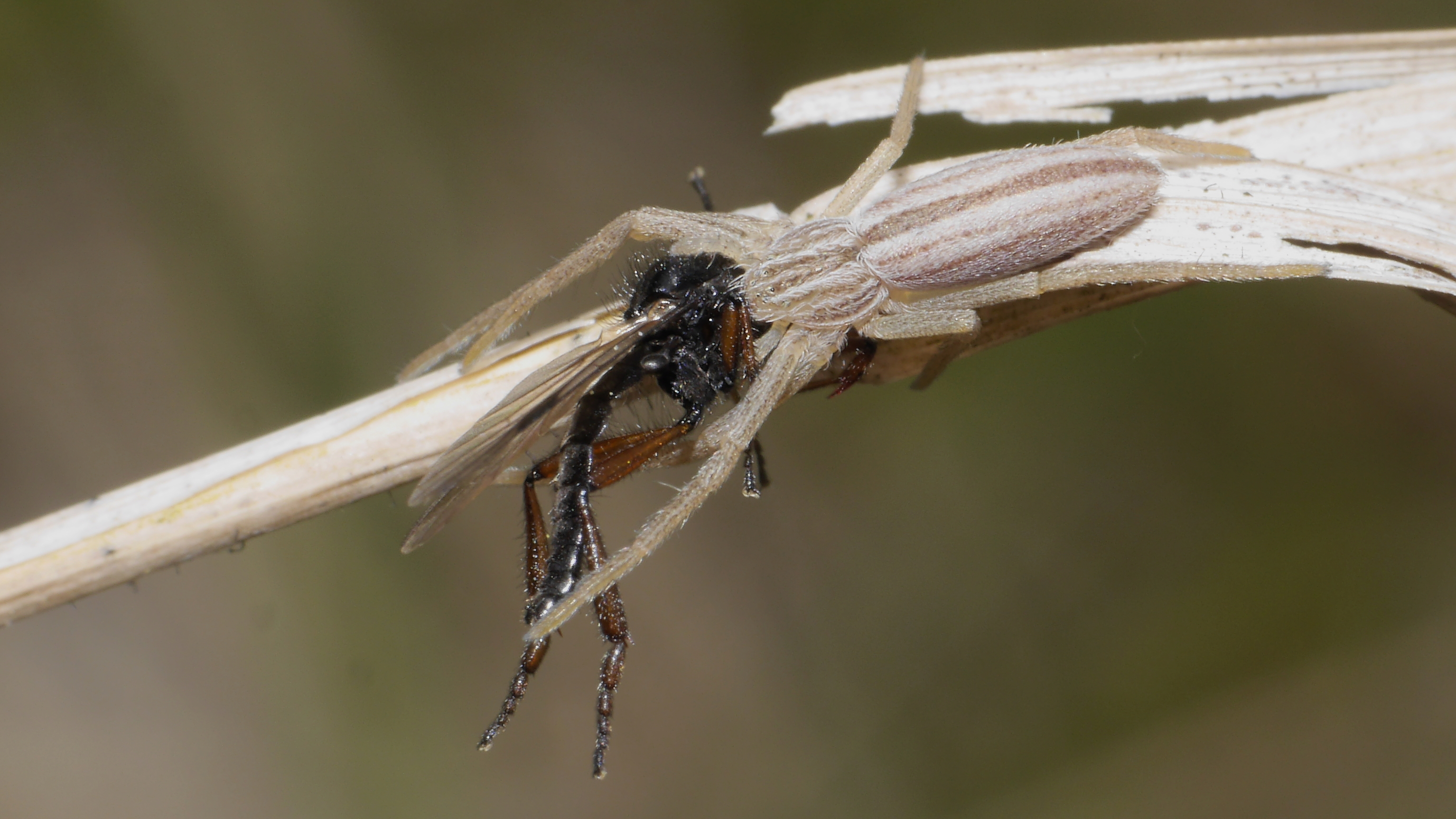
- T. oblongus
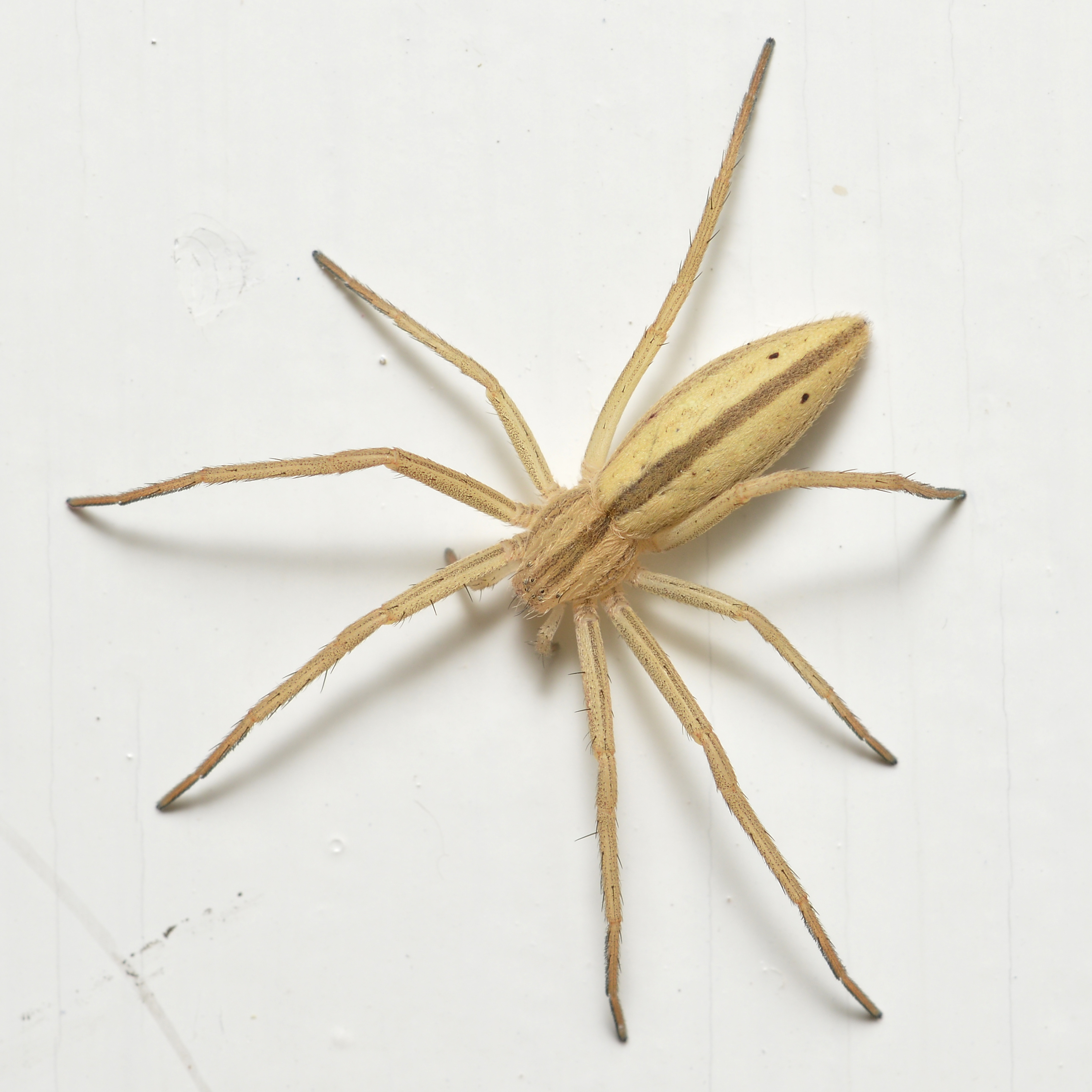
- Tibellus sp. from Norway

Scientific classification
- Kingdom: Animalia
- Phylum: Arthropoda
- Subphylum: Chelicerata
- Class: Arachnida
- Order: Araneae
- Infraorder: Araneomorphae
- Family: Philodromidae
- Genus: Tibellus; Simon, 1875

= Tibellus =

Genus of spiders

Tibellus is a genus of slender crab spiders described by Simon in 1875, belonging to the order Araneae, family Philodromidae. Species of this genus are present in Eurasia, Africa, Americas and Australia.

== Description ==
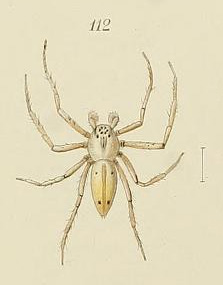
Drawing of female T. tenellus from Bösenberg & Strand (1906)

Adult members of this genus can reach 4–15 millimetres (0.16–0.59 in) of length and can mostly be encountered above the soil surface (epigeal organism) on low vegetation, foliage or herbaceous plants, where they actively pursue their preys, as they do not make webs. This genus, which includes active hunters, was once considered a subfamily within the sedentary 'crab spiders' (Thomisidae species).

The basic color of the body is light brown or pale yellow. It is elongate and slender (hence the common name), the carapace (prosoma) and the cylindrical abdomen (opisthosoma) show a large brown stripe in the midline of the back. The long and thin legs are more or less equal in length and they usually are stretched out along grass stems or leaves, the first two pairs forwardly directed.

They generally have eight black equal-sized eyes in two horizontal rows of four each, with posterior median ones close to each other.

== Species list ==
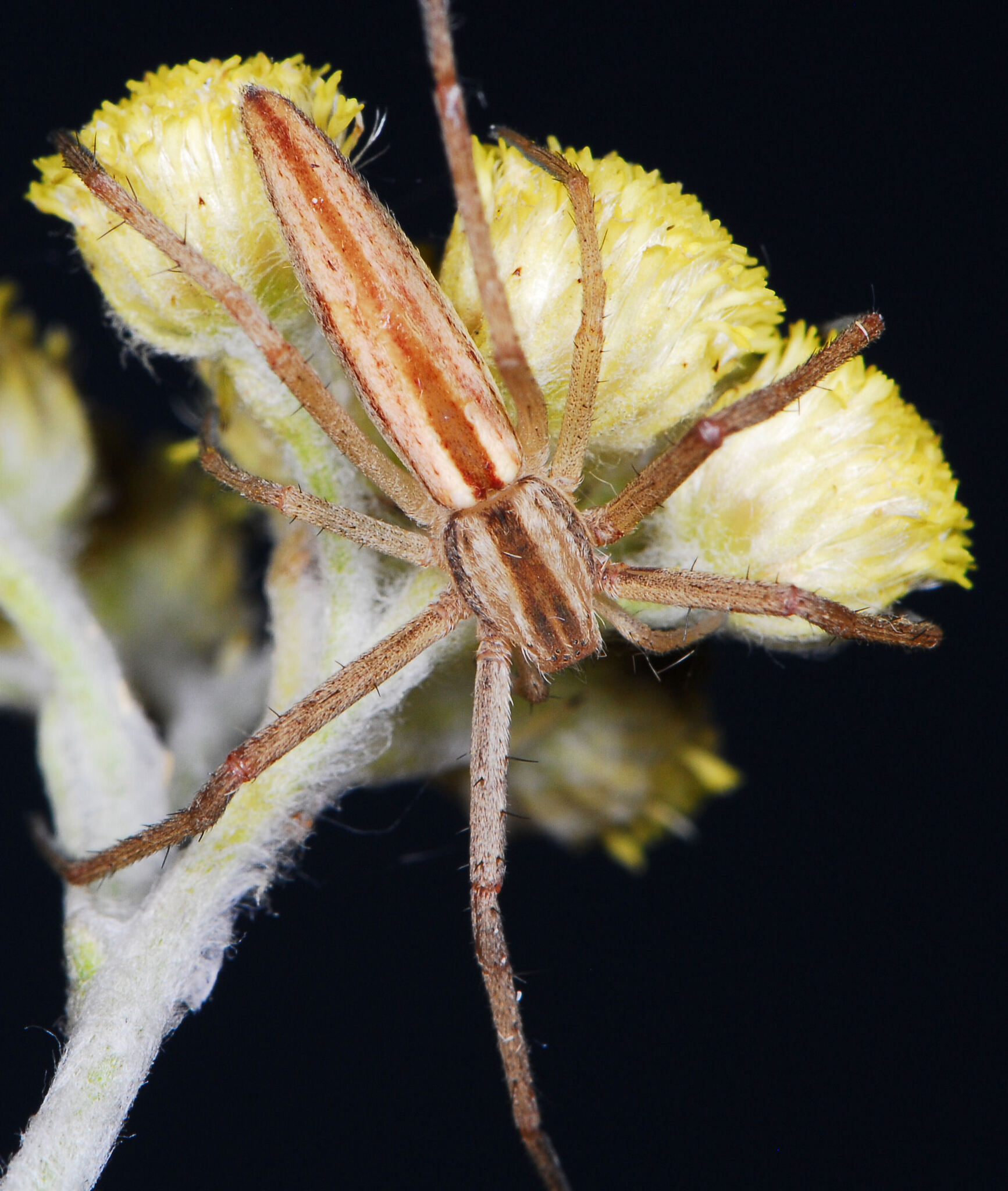
T. hollidayi

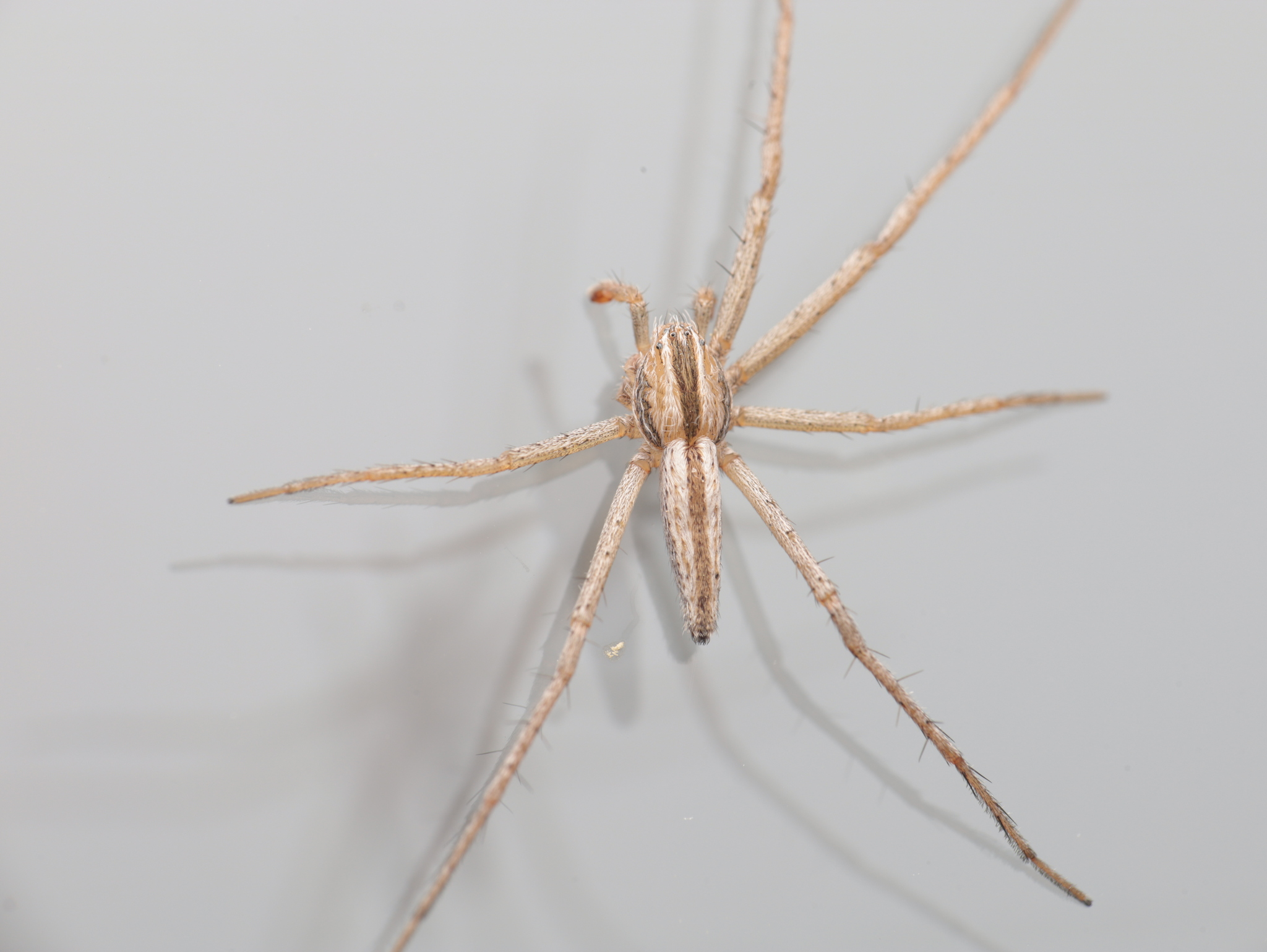
T. macellus

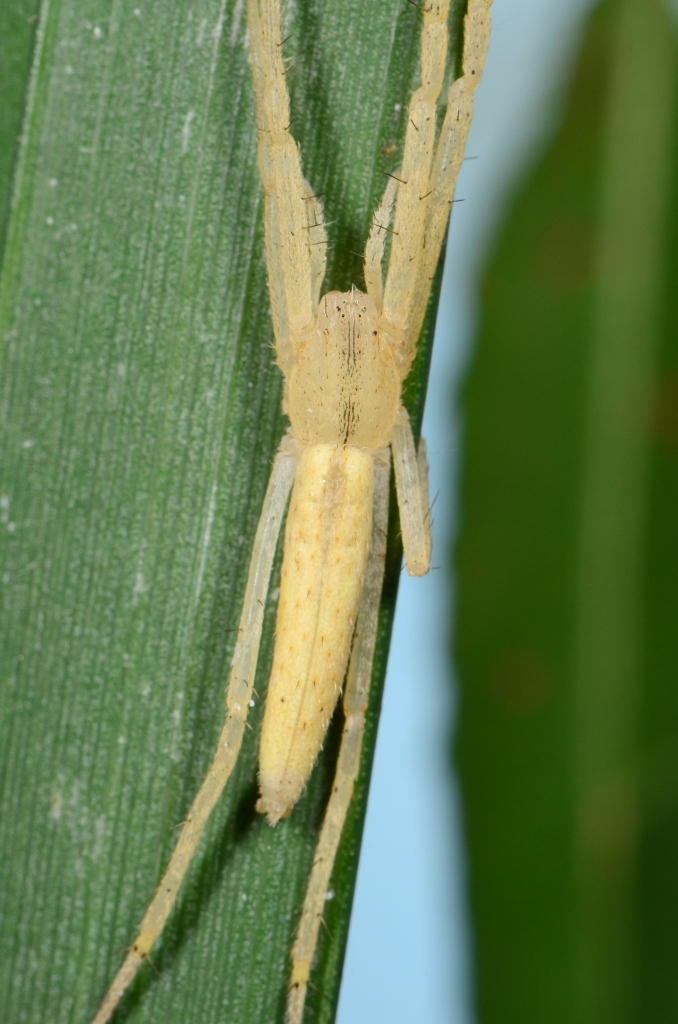
T. minor

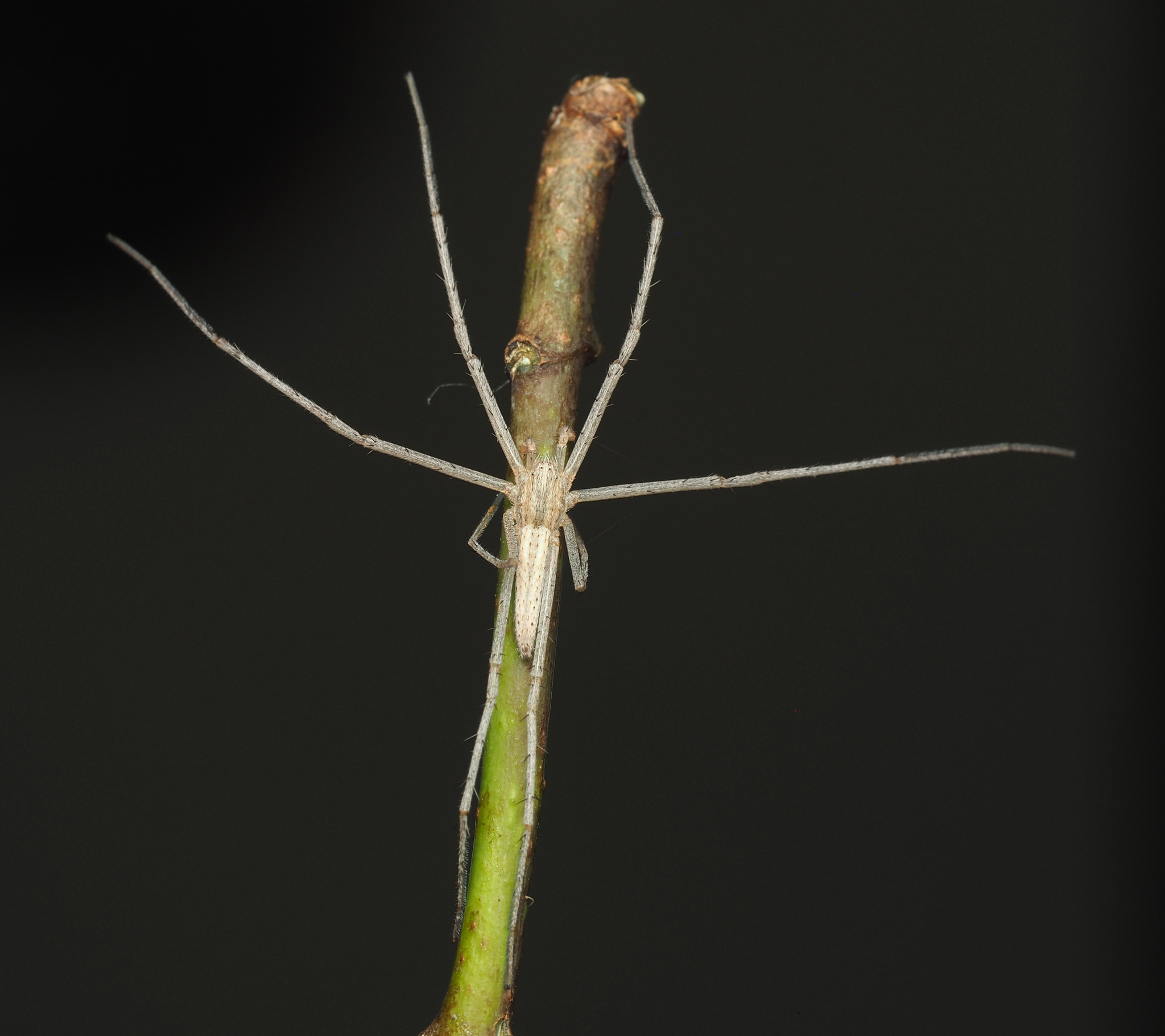
T. tenellus

As of October 2026, this genus includes 52 species and two subspecies:

- Tibellus affinis O. Pickard-Cambridge, 1898 – Mexico
- Tibellus armatus Lessert, 1928 – DR Congo, Tanzania, Botswana, Zimbabwe, Mozambique, South Africa
- Tibellus asiaticus Kulczyński, 1908 – Russia (Middle Siberia to Far East), North America
- Tibellus aspersus Danilov, 1991 – Russia, Far East)
- Tibellus australis (Simon, 1910) – Botswana, Zimbabwe, South Africa
- Tibellus bagerhatensis Biswas, 2026 – Bangladesh
- Tibellus bruneitarsis Lawrence, 1952 – Zimbabwe, South Africa
- Tibellus californicus Schick, 1965 – United States
- Tibellus chamberlini Gertsch, 1933 – Canada, United States
- Tibellus chaturshingi Tikader, 1962 – India
- Tibellus chilensis Mello-Leitão, 1943 – Chile
- Tibellus cobusi Van den Berg & Dippenaar-Schoeman, 1994 – Somalia, Mozambique, South Africa
- Tibellus cucurbitus Yang, Zhu & Song, 2005 – China
- Tibellus demangei Jézéquel, 1964 – Ivory Coast, South Africa
- Tibellus deokjeok Jang, Lee, Yoo, Bae & Kim, 2023 – Korea
- Tibellus duttoni (Hentz, 1847) – Canada, United States, Mexico
- Tibellus fengi Efimik, 1999 – Russia (Far East), China, Korea, Japan
- Tibellus flavipes Caporiacco, 1939 – Somalia, Kenya, Tanzania, Mozambique, South Africa
- Tibellus gerhardi Van den Berg & Dippenaar-Schoeman, 1994 – Sudan, DR Congo, Botswana, Zimbabwe, Mozambique, South Africa
- Tibellus gimcheon Jang, Lee, Yoo, Bae & Kim, 2023 – Korea
- Tibellus hollidayi Lawrence, 1952 – Ethiopia, DR Congo, Rwanda, Tanzania, Zimbabwe, South Africa
- Tibellus insularis Gertsch, 1933 – Cuba
- Tibellus jabalpurensis Gajbe & Gajbe, 1999 – India
- Tibellus japonicus Efimik, 1999 – Russia, (Far East), China, Korea, Japan
- Tibellus katrajghatus Tikader, 1962 – India
- Tibellus kibonotensis Lessert, 1919 – Burkina Faso, Uganda, Rwanda, Tanzania, Malawi, Zimbabwe, Mozambique, South Africa
- Tibellus kimi Kim & Seong, 2015 – Korea
- Tibellus macellus Simon, 1875 – Europe, Turkey, Caucasus, Russia, (Europe to Far East), Kazakhstan
  - Tibellus macellus georgicus Mcheidze, 1997 – Georgia
- Tibellus maritimus (Menge, 1875) – North America, Europe, Caucasus, Russia (Europe to Far East), Central Asia, China
- Tibellus minor Lessert, 1919 – Sub-Saharan Africa
- Tibellus nigeriensis Millot, 1942 – Cabo Verde, Mali
- Tibellus nimbaensis Van den Berg & Dippenaar-Schoeman, 1994 – Guinea
- Tibellus oblongus (Walckenaer, 1802) – North America, Europe, North Africa, Turkey, Israel, Caucasus, Russia, (Europe to Far East), Kazakhstan, Iran, Central Asia, Mongolia, China, Korea, Japan (type species)
  - Tibellus oblongus maculatus Caporiacco, 1950 – Italy
- Tibellus orientis Efimik, 1999 – Russia ( Far East), China
- Tibellus pashanensis Tikader, 1980 – India
- Tibellus pateli Tikader, 1980 – India
- Tibellus poonaensis Tikader, 1962 – India
- Tibellus propositus Roewer, 1951 – China, (Yarkand)
- Tibellus rothi Schick, 1965 – United States
- Tibellus septempunctatus Millot, 1942 – Guinea
- Tibellus seriepunctatus Simon, 1907 – Sub-Saharan Africa
- Tibellus shikerpurensis Biswas & Raychaudhuri, 2003 – Bangladesh
- Tibellus sihwa Jang, Lee, Yoo, Bae & Kim, 2023 – Korea
- Tibellus somaliensis Van den Berg & Dippenaar-Schoeman, 1994 – Somalia, Zimbabwe
- Tibellus spinosus Schiapelli & Gerschman, 1941 – Argentina
- Tibellus sunetae Van den Berg & Dippenaar-Schoeman, 1994 – Zimbabwe, Mozambique, South Africa
- Tibellus tenellus (L. Koch, 1876) – Australia (Queensland)
- Tibellus utotchkini Ponomarev, 2008 – France, Romania, Moldova, Russia, Caucasus)
- Tibellus vitilis Simon, 1906 – India, Sri Lanka
- Tibellus vossioni Simon, 1884 – Egypt, Ethiopia, Sudan, Ivory Coast, DR Congo, South Africa, Saudi Arabia
- Tibellus yeongdong Jang, Lee, Yoo, Bae & Kim, 2023 – Korea
- Tibellus zhui Tang & Song, 1989 – China

== Bibliography ==
- A Van den Berg - A revision of the Afrotropical species of the genus Tibellus Simon (Araneae: Philodromidae) - A. S A.S. Dippenaar-Schoeman - Vol 37, No 1 (1994)
- L. Watson and M. J. Dallwitz - The Families of Spiders Represented in the British Isles - Philodromidae
- Michael J Roberts - The spiders of Great Britain and Ireland
