= Tibellus demangei =

Ivory Coast Grass Running Spider

Conservation status
- Least Concern (SANBI Red List)

Scientific classification
- Kingdom: Animalia
- Phylum: Arthropoda
- Subphylum: Chelicerata
- Class: Arachnida
- Order: Araneae
- Infraorder: Araneomorphae
- Family: Philodromidae
- Genus: Tibellus
- Species: T. demangei

Binomial name
- Tibellus demangei Jézéquel, 1964

Species of spider

Tibellus demangei is a species of spider in the family Philodromidae. It is found in Africa and is commonly known as the Ivory Coast grass running spider.

== Distribution ==
Tibellus demangei is an African endemic described from the Ivory Coast and also recorded from South Africa. This species is under-collected and suspected to occur in more countries. In South Africa, the species is recorded only from KwaZulu-Natal.

== Habitat and ecology ==
The species inhabits the Indian Ocean Coastal Belt biome, occurring at an altitude of 78 m above sea level. Tibellus demangei are free-living plant dwellers commonly found on bushes and tall grass.

== Description ==
Tibellus demangei is known from both sexes.

== Conservation ==
Tibellus demangei is listed as Least Concern by the South African National Biodiversity Institute due to its wide geographical range. There are no obvious threats to the species and no conservation actions are recommended.

== Taxonomy ==
The species was originally described by J.-F. Jézéquel in 1964 from the Ivory Coast. It was revised by Van den Berg and Dippenaar-Schoeman in 1994.
