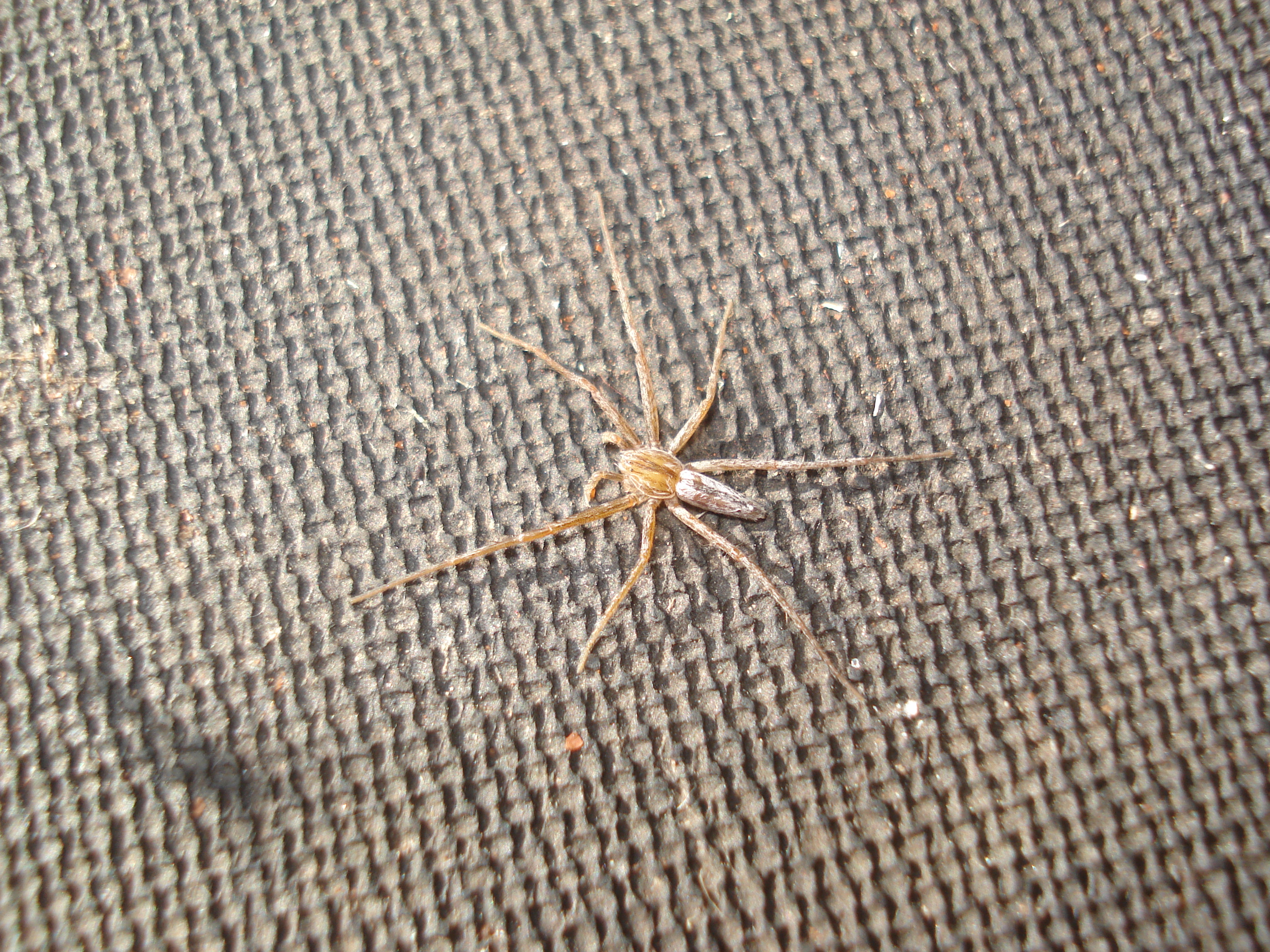

Conservation status
- Critically Endangered (IUCN 3.1)

Scientific classification
- Kingdom: Animalia
- Phylum: Arthropoda
- Subphylum: Chelicerata
- Class: Arachnida
- Order: Araneae
- Infraorder: Araneomorphae
- Family: Philodromidae
- Genus: Tibellus
- Species: T. macellus

Binomial name
- Tibellus macellus Simon, 1875

Subspecies
- Tibellus macellus georgicus Mcheidze, 1997 — Georgia

= Tibellus macellus =

Species of spider

Tibellus macellus is a spider found from Europe to Central Asia.
