= Tibellus bruneitarsis =

Umhahli Grass Running Spider

Conservation status
- Least Concern (SANBI Red List)

Scientific classification
- Kingdom: Animalia
- Phylum: Arthropoda
- Subphylum: Chelicerata
- Class: Arachnida
- Order: Araneae
- Infraorder: Araneomorphae
- Family: Philodromidae
- Genus: Tibellus
- Species: T. bruneitarsis

Binomial name
- Tibellus bruneitarsis Lawrence, 1952

Species of spider

Tibellus bruneitarsis is a species of spider in the family Philodromidae. It is found in southern Africa and is commonly known as the Umhahli grass running spider.

== Etymology ==
The species is named after Umhlali, a town in KwaZulu-Natal where the species was first collected.

== Distribution ==
Tibellus bruneitarsis is a southern African species known from Zimbabwe and South Africa. In South Africa, it occurs in Limpopo and KwaZulu-Natal provinces and is protected in the Polokwane Nature Reserve.

== Habitat and ecology ==
The species inhabits the Indian Ocean Coastal Belt and Savanna biomes, occurring at altitudes ranging from 18 to 1,310 m above sea level. Tibellus bruneitarsis are free-living plant dwellers commonly found on bushes and tall grass.

== Description ==
Tibellus bruneitarsis is known only from females.

== Conservation ==
Tibellus bruneitarsis is listed as Least Concern by the South African National Biodiversity Institute due to its wide geographical range. The species is protected in the Polokwane Nature Reserve.

== Taxonomy ==
The species was originally described by Reginald Frederick Lawrence in 1952 from Umhlali in KwaZulu-Natal. It was revised by Van den Berg and Dippenaar-Schoeman in 1994.
