= Tibellus cobusi =

Cobus's Grass Running Spider

Conservation status
- Least Concern (SANBI Red List)

Scientific classification
- Kingdom: Animalia
- Phylum: Arthropoda
- Subphylum: Chelicerata
- Class: Arachnida
- Order: Araneae
- Infraorder: Araneomorphae
- Family: Philodromidae
- Genus: Tibellus
- Species: T. cobusi

Binomial name
- Tibellus cobusi Van den Berg & Dippenaar-Schoeman, 1994

Species of spider

Tibellus cobusi is a species of spider in the family Philodromidae. It is found in parts of Africa and is commonly known as Cobus's grass running spider.

== Distribution ==
Tibellus cobusi is an African species known from Mozambique, Somalia, and South Africa. In South Africa, the species is known only from Limpopo province.

== Habitat and ecology ==
The species inhabits the Savanna biome, occurring at altitudes ranging from 894 to 1,261 m above sea level. Tibellus cobusi are free-living plant dwellers commonly found on bushes and tall grass.

== Description ==
Tibellus cobusi is known only from males..

== Conservation ==
Tibellus cobusi is listed as Least Concern by the South African National Biodiversity Institute. Although the species is presently known only from one sex, it has a wide geographical range. The species is protected in the Blouberg Nature Reserve and Malebogo Nature Reserve.

== Taxonomy ==
The species was described by Van den Berg and Dippenaar-Schoeman in 1994 from Potgietersrus (now Mokopane) in Limpopo.
