= Tibellus duttoni =

Scientific classification
- Domain: Eukaryota
- Kingdom: Animalia
- Phylum: Arthropoda
- Subphylum: Chelicerata
- Class: Arachnida
- Order: Araneae
- Infraorder: Araneomorphae
- Family: Philodromidae
- Genus: Tibellus
- Species: T. duttoni

Binomial name
- Tibellus duttoni (Hentz, 1847)

Species of spider

Tibellus duttoni is a species of running crab spider in the family Philodromidae. It is found in the United States and Mexico.
