= Tibellus vossioni =

African Grass Running Spider

Conservation status
- Least Concern (SANBI Red List)

Scientific classification
- Kingdom: Animalia
- Phylum: Arthropoda
- Subphylum: Chelicerata
- Class: Arachnida
- Order: Araneae
- Infraorder: Araneomorphae
- Family: Philodromidae
- Genus: Tibellus
- Species: T. vossioni

Binomial name
- Tibellus vossioni Simon, 1884

Species of spider

Tibellus vossioni is a species of spider in the family Philodromidae. It is found in Africa and the Arabian Peninsula and is commonly known as the African grass running spider.

== Distribution ==
Tibellus vossioni is known from Saudi Arabia and several African countries, namely Democratic Republic of the Congo, Egypt, Ethiopia, Ivory Coast, Sudan, and South Africa. In South Africa, the species is known from two provinces and is protected in the Roodeplaatdam Nature Reserve.

== Habitat and ecology ==
The species inhabits Fynbos and Savanna biomes. Tibellus vossioni are free-living plant dwellers found on bushes and tall grass.

== Description ==
Tibellus vossioni is known only from males.

== Conservation ==
Tibellus vossioni is listed as Least Concern by the South African National Biodiversity Institute due to its wide geographical range, but the species is under-sampled in South Africa. There are no obvious threats and no conservation actions are recommended.

== Etymology ==
The species is named after collector M. Vossion.

== Taxonomy ==
The species was originally described by Eugène Simon in 1884 from Sudan. It was revised by Van den Berg and Dippenaar-Schoeman in 1994.
