= Tibellus kibonotensis =

Tanzania Grass Running Spider

Conservation status
- Least Concern (SANBI Red List)

Scientific classification
- Kingdom: Animalia
- Phylum: Arthropoda
- Subphylum: Chelicerata
- Class: Arachnida
- Order: Araneae
- Infraorder: Araneomorphae
- Family: Philodromidae
- Genus: Tibellus
- Species: T. kibonotensis

Binomial name
- Tibellus kibonotensis Lessert, 1919

Species of spider

Tibellus kibonotensis is a species of spider in the family Philodromidae. It is found in Africa and is commonly known as the Tanzania grass running spider.

== Distribution ==
Tibellus kibonotensis is an African endemic known from nine countries: Burkina Faso, East Africa, Malawi, Mozambique, Rwanda, Tanzania, Uganda, Zimbabwe, and South Africa. In South Africa, the species has been sampled from four provinces and is protected in the Ezemvelo Nature Reserve.

== Habitat and ecology ==
The species inhabits Grassland, Savanna and Thicket biomes, occurring at altitudes ranging from 18 to 1,722 m above sea level. Tibellus kibonotensis are free-living plant dwellers commonly found on bushes and tall grass.

== Description ==
Tibellus kibonotensis is known from both sexes.

== Conservation ==
Tibellus kibonotensis is listed as Least Concern by the South African National Biodiversity Institute due to its wide geographical range. There are no obvious threats to the species and no conservation actions are recommended.

== Taxonomy ==
The species was originally described by Roger de Lessert in 1919 from Tanzania. It was revised by Van den Berg and Dippenaar-Schoeman in 1994.
