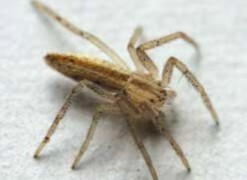
- female

Scientific classification
- Kingdom: Animalia
- Phylum: Arthropoda
- Subphylum: Chelicerata
- Class: Arachnida
- Order: Araneae
- Infraorder: Araneomorphae
- Family: Philodromidae
- Genus: Tibellus
- Species: T. flavipes

Binomial name
- Tibellus flavipes Caporiacco, 1939

Synonyms
- Tibellus vossioni flavipes Caporiacco, 1941

= Tibellus flavipes =

Zululand Grass Running Spider

Species of spider

Tibellus flavipes is a species of spider in the family Philodromidae. It is found in Africa and is commonly known as the Zululand grass running spider.

== Distribution ==
Tibellus flavipes is an African species known from Kenya, Mozambique, Somalia, Tanzania, and South Africa. In South Africa, the species is known only from KwaZulu-Natal, including six protected areas.

== Habitat and ecology ==
The species inhabits the Savanna and Indian Ocean Coastal Belt biomes, occurring at altitudes ranging from 18 to 150 above sea level. Tibellus flavipes are free-living plant dwellers commonly found on bushes and tall grass.

== Description ==
Tibellus flavipes is known from both sexes. Tibellus flavipes has an abdomen with three black spots. Their copulatory opening guides broaden at their bases.

== Conservation ==
Tibellus flavipes is listed as Least Concern by the South African National Biodiversity Institute due to its wide geographical range. The species is protected in several reserves in South Africa including Hluhluwe Nature Reserve, iSimangaliso Wetland Park, and Ndumo Game Reserve.

== Taxonomy ==
The species was originally described by Lodovico di Caporiacco in 1939 from Kenya. It was originally described as a subspecies of Tibellus vossioni but was elevated to species status by Van den Berg and Dippenaar-Schoeman in 1994.
