= Tibellus australis =

Botswana Grass Running Spider

Conservation status
- Least Concern (SANBI Red List)

Scientific classification
- Kingdom: Animalia
- Phylum: Arthropoda
- Subphylum: Chelicerata
- Class: Arachnida
- Order: Araneae
- Infraorder: Araneomorphae
- Family: Philodromidae
- Genus: Tibellus
- Species: T. australis

Binomial name
- Tibellus australis (Simon, 1910)

Species of spider

Tibellus australis is a species of spider in the family Philodromidae. It is found in southern Africa and is commonly known as the Botswana grass running spider.

== Distribution ==
Tibellus australis has a limited distribution across three southern African countries: Botswana, Zimbabwe, and South Africa. In South Africa, the species is known only from Limpopo province, where it occurs in the Blouberg Nature Reserve and Little Leigh in the Western Soutpansberg.

== Habitat and ecology ==
The species inhabits the Savanna biome, where it lives as a free-living plant dweller commonly found on bushes and tall grass. It occurs at altitudes ranging from 894 to 1,372 m above sea level.

== Description ==
Tibellus australis is known only from females.

== Conservation ==
Tibellus australis is listed as Least Concern by the South African National Biodiversity Institute due to its wide geographical range across southern Africa. The species is protected within the Blouberg Nature Reserve.

== Taxonomy ==
The species was originally described by Eugène Simon in 1910 from Botswana. It was revised by Van den Berg and Dippenaar-Schoeman in 1994. More sampling is needed to find the male of this species.
