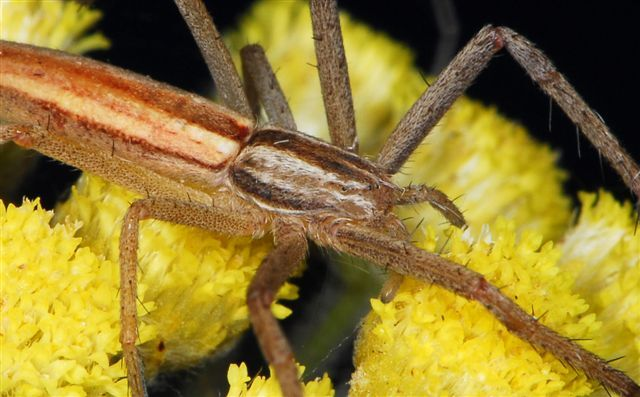
- female
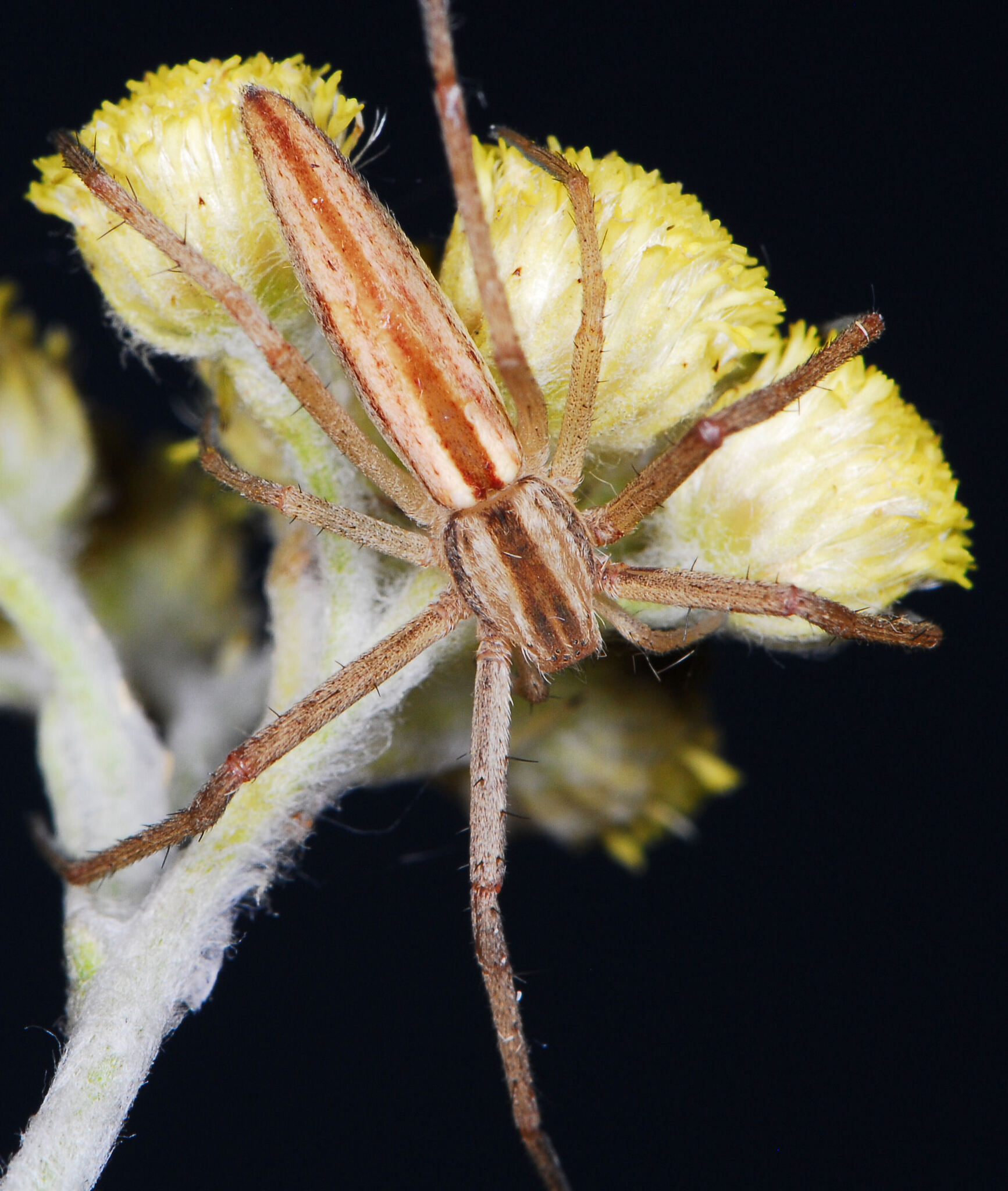
- female

Scientific classification
- Kingdom: Animalia
- Phylum: Arthropoda
- Subphylum: Chelicerata
- Class: Arachnida
- Order: Araneae
- Infraorder: Araneomorphae
- Family: Philodromidae
- Genus: Tibellus
- Species: T. hollidayi

Binomial name
- Tibellus hollidayi Lawrence, 1952

= Tibellus hollidayi =

Pietermaritzburg Grass Running Spider

Species of spider

Tibellus hollidayi is a species of spider in the family Philodromidae. It is found in Africa and is commonly known as the Pietermaritzburg grass running spider.

== Distribution ==
Tibellus hollidayi is an African spider known from Democratic Republic of the Congo, Ethiopia, Rwanda, Tanzania, Zimbabwe, and South Africa. In South Africa, the species is known from eight provinces including more than ten protected areas.

== Habitat and ecology ==
The species inhabits Fynbos, Grassland, Nama Karoo, and Savanna biomes, occurring at altitudes ranging from 47 to 1,919 m above sea level. Tibellus hollidayi are free-living plant dwellers commonly found on bushes and tall grass.

== Conservation ==
Tibellus hollidayi is listed as Least Concern by the South African National Biodiversity Institute due to its wide geographical range. The species is protected in more than ten protected areas and there are no obvious threats.

== Taxonomy ==
The species was originally described by Reginald Frederick Lawrence in 1952 from Pietermaritzburg in KwaZulu-Natal. It was revised by Van den Berg and Dippenaar-Schoeman in 1994.
