= Tibellus seriepunctatus =

Spotted Grass Running Spider

Conservation status
- Least Concern (SANBI Red List)

Scientific classification
- Kingdom: Animalia
- Phylum: Arthropoda
- Subphylum: Chelicerata
- Class: Arachnida
- Order: Araneae
- Infraorder: Araneomorphae
- Family: Philodromidae
- Genus: Tibellus
- Species: T. seriepunctatus

Binomial name
- Tibellus seriepunctatus Simon, 1907

Species of spider

Tibellus seriepunctatus is a species of spider in the family Philodromidae. It is found throughout sub-Saharan Africa and is commonly known as the spotted grass running spider.

== Distribution ==
Tibellus seriepunctatus is an African species with a wide distribution throughout Africa. In South Africa, the species is known from two provinces and is protected in the Mkambati Nature Reserve.

== Habitat and ecology ==
The species inhabits Grassland, Savanna and Thicket biomes, occurring at altitudes ranging from 1 to 1,415 m above sea level. Tibellus seriepunctatus are free-living plant dwellers commonly found on bushes and tall grass.

== Description ==
Tibellus seriepunctatus is known from both sexes.

== Conservation ==
Tibellus seriepunctatus is listed as Least Concern by the South African National Biodiversity Institute due to its wide geographical range. There are no obvious threats to the species and no conservation actions are recommended.

== Taxonomy ==
The species was originally described by Eugène Simon in 1907 from Sierra Leone. It was revised by Van den Berg and Dippenaar-Schoeman in 1994.
