= Tibellus gerhardi =

Loskopdam Grass Running Spider

Conservation status
- Least Concern (SANBI Red List)

Scientific classification
- Kingdom: Animalia
- Phylum: Arthropoda
- Subphylum: Chelicerata
- Class: Arachnida
- Order: Araneae
- Infraorder: Araneomorphae
- Family: Philodromidae
- Genus: Tibellus
- Species: T. gerhardi

Binomial name
- Tibellus gerhardi Van den Berg & Dippenaar-Schoeman, 1994

Species of spider

Tibellus gerhardi is a species of spider in the family Philodromidae. It is found in Africa and is commonly known as the Loskopdam grass running spider.

== Distribution ==
Tibellus gerhardi is an African endemic known from seven countries: Botswana, Democratic Republic of the Congo, Mozambique, Sudan, Zimbabwe, and South Africa. In South Africa, the species is known from five provinces including four protected areas.

== Habitat and ecology ==
The species inhabits Grassland and Savanna biomes, occurring at altitudes ranging from 91 to 1,698 above sea level. Tibellus gerhardi are free-living plant dwellers commonly found on bushes and tall grass.

== Description ==
Tibellus gerhardi is known from both sexes.

== Conservation ==
Tibellus gerhardi is listed as Least Concern by the South African National Biodiversity Institute due to its wide geographical range. The species is protected in four reserves including Roodeplaatdam Nature Reserve, Tembe Elephant Park, Polokwane Nature Reserve, and Rustenburg Nature Reserve.

== Taxonomy ==
The species was described by Van den Berg and Dippenaar-Schoeman in 1994 from Loskop Dam in Mpumalanga.
