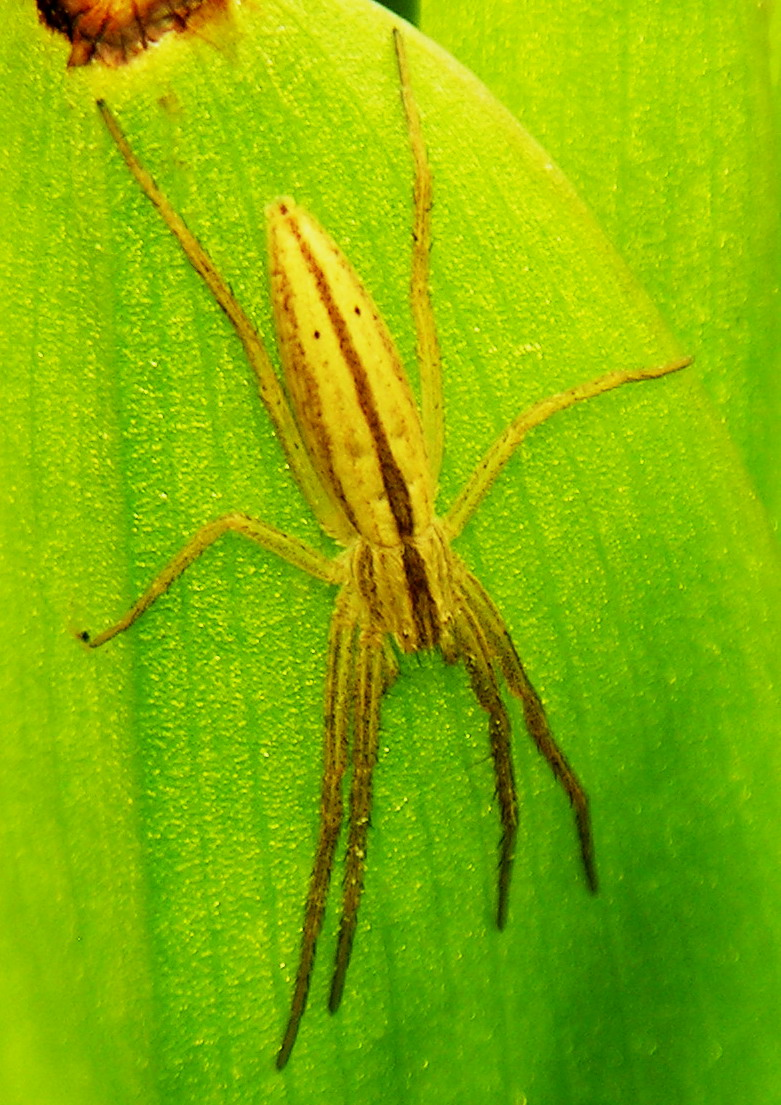

Scientific classification
- Domain: Eukaryota
- Kingdom: Animalia
- Phylum: Arthropoda
- Subphylum: Chelicerata
- Class: Arachnida
- Order: Araneae
- Infraorder: Araneomorphae
- Family: Philodromidae
- Genus: Tibellus
- Species: T. oblongus

Binomial name
- Tibellus oblongus (Walckenaer, 1802)

Subspecies
- Tibellus oblongus maculatus Caporiacco, 1950 — Italy

Synonyms
- Aranea oblonga Walckenaer, 1802; Tibellus punctatus Hull, 1955; Tibellus longicephalus Utochkin, 1981; Tibellus lineatus Utochkin, 1981

= Tibellus oblongus =

Species of spider

Tibellus oblongus, also called the oblong running spider or slender crab spider, is a spider with a Holarctic distribution. It does not spin webs, but instead actively hunts small insects, which it kills with venom. T. oblongus lives in grassy habitats and can be preyed upon by larger spiders, such as wolf spiders like Hogna baltimoriana.

== See also ==
- List of Philodromidae species
