= Endraum =

German band

Endraum is a German darkwave band founded in 1989 by Hovi Miskovics and Roman Rütten in Frankfurt am Main.

== Background ==
The group emerged from the previous band Crux Ansata, who released an album independently in 1989. Although Endraum's roots are in guitar-oriented post-punk and dark wave, their music, mostly by Ruetten, was mainly electronic from the beginning.

In contrast to Goethes Erben or Das Ich, Endraum never had a large commercial breakthrough. Their concerts are infrequent, and tend to be in Europe. They have held concerts in Germany, Italy, Russia, Greece, Poland, Belgium, occasionally with a bassist as a guest musician. Unlike many electronic-oriented bands, Endraum's concerts use live instruments. Only the rhythms come from DAT.

After releasing their first two albums on the Danse Macabre label, Endraum founded their own label Weisser Herbst Produktion in 1994. The label is now a part of the Trisol Music Group, which includes such bands as The Frozen Autumn, End of Orgy and Sea of Tranquility.

== Musical style ==
Endraum, along with the likes of Goethes Erben and Das Ich, was part of the late 1980s German darkwave movement called Neue Deutsche Todeskunst. In the mid-1990s, Endraum's style moved increasingly towards ambient and electronica.

The complexity of their compositions and frequent use of natural-sounding piano and string voices give Endraum a very "organic" sound. The vocals are usually Hovi Miskovics' calm German spoken word lyrics, which often contain surrealist puns and allusions. Miskovics also designs the CD artwork in a Surrealist style reminiscent of Cubist paintings. Several of their albums have guest musicians such as Laura Carleton from Sea of Tranquility or Yvon Million and Dominique Oudiou from the French coldwave band Neutral Project.

== Other ==
Endraum produced a soundtrack for the two-part ARD documentary "Hitlers Stellvertreter -- Aufstieg und Fall des Rudolf Heß" (first broadcast on May 18, 2005) More music productions for German TV followed ("Zug um Zug" theme night on Arte, first broadcast on 31 May 2005, and "Der Tag als ich mein Herz schlagen hörte" for Frankfurt Radio, first broadcast on July 4, 2005).

== Discography ==
=== Demos ===
- Phantastisch Zwecklos (1991, re-released 1998)
- Sehnsucht (1991, re-released 1998)
- Der Rosengarten (1992)

=== Albums ===
- Zeitenlicht (1993)
- In flimmernder Nacht (1993)
- Morgenröte (1994)
- Appell an die Muse (1994)
- Innerlichkeit (1996)
- Der blaue Kreis - Remixe (1996)
- blauK (1996, live recording from May 26 1995, Festival Dahee, Paris)
- Nachtstrahl (1998)
- Blauhauch (1999)
- Der Leanderkern (2001, DoCD)
- Herzklang spiegelt am Strassenrand (2001)
- Traumstaub (2004, CD with DVD)
- Zeitfäden (2008, limited to 300 hand-numbered CDs)

=== Fan club CDs ===
Endraum maintain a mailing list to keep in touch with their supporters and in recent years have a regular fan meeting in Frankfurt. There, attendees have the opportunity to receive special CDs of mostly unpublished material, limited to 10-20 copies.

- Weimar 99 (2000, live recording)
- Der Leanderkern (2000, CD 2 of the 2001 release Der Leanderkern)
- Crux Ansata – I Feel the Atmosphere (2001, 4-track recording of pre-Endraum projects)
- Herzklang (2001, instrumental version of Herzklang spiegelt am Strassenrand)
- Eine Nacht im Traumstaub (2002, recorded one night in the studio, in memory of Yvon Million)
- Es ist ein Augenblick (2003, recording of a 2001 Moscow concert)
- Filmmusik 2005 (2005, Soundtracks of the TV productions "Hitlers Stellvertreter" and "Der Tag, als ich mein Herz schlagen hörte")
