= Bruno Kramm =

German musician (1967–2026)

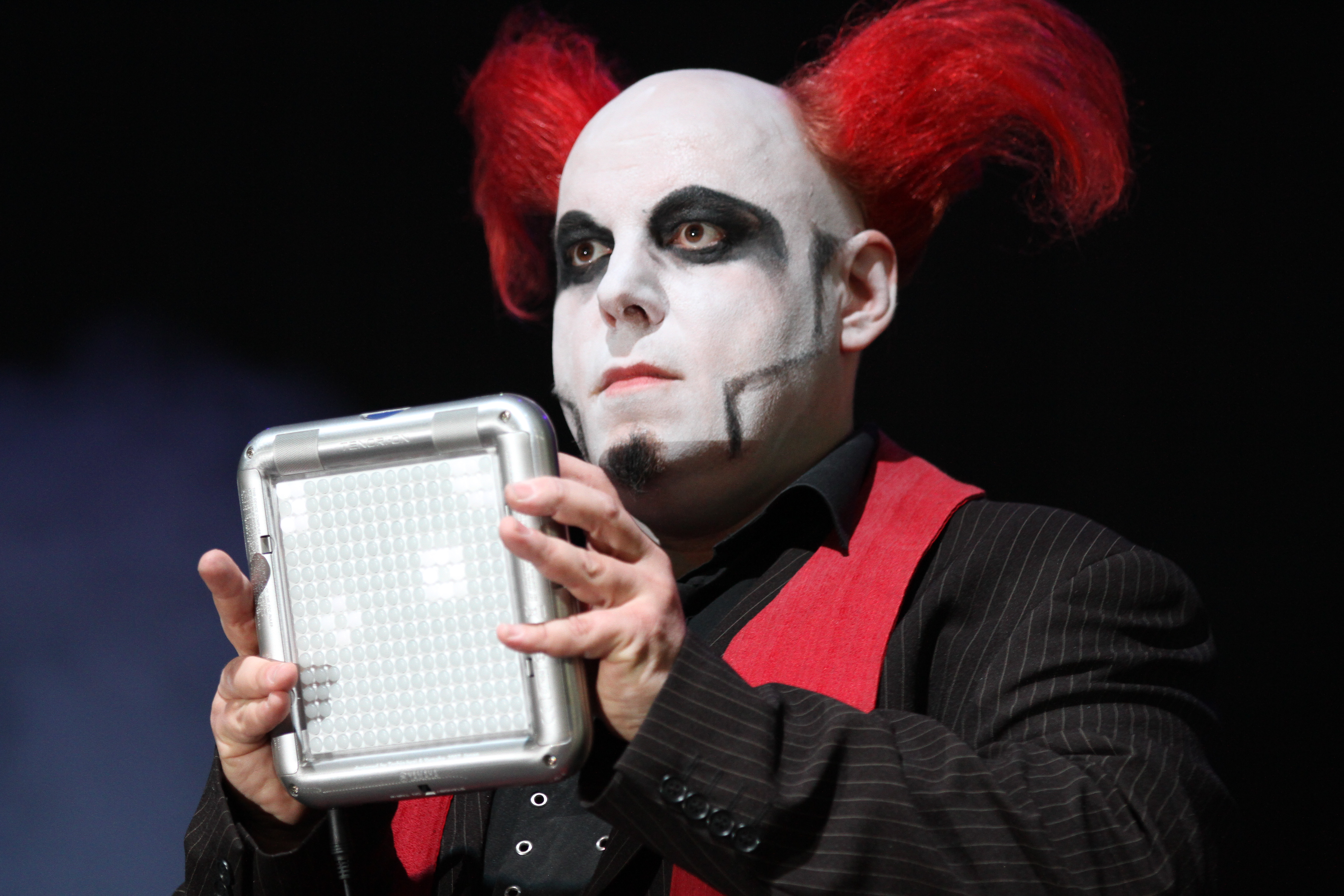
- Kramm in 2013

Background information
- Born: Bruno Kramm; 13 October 1967; Munich, Bavaria, West Germany
- Died: 25 September 2026 (aged 58) Granada, Spain
- Genre: Electro-industrial
- Occupations: Singer-songwriter; record producer
- Instruments: Keyboards; synthesizer; backup vocals
- Years active: 1980–2026
- Labels: Danse Macabre; Metropolis; Massacre
- Formerly of: Das Ich

Bruno Gert Kramm (13 October 1967 – 25 September 2026) was a German musician known for music programming, playing synthesizers and keyboards, and co-fronting and performing backup vocals for the electro-industrial duo Das Ich, alongside Stefan Ackermann. Kramm was a multi-instrumentalist, singer-songwriter, and founder of the German goth club Generation Gothic. He was also a record producer for a number of musical projects.

Known for his iconic devil-horn hair, Kramm would sport a dark outfit during Das Ich performances, often being significantly more made-up than vocalist Ackermann. His vocals brought a deep and intense feel that contrasted with Ackermann's fast-paced, shrill, and excited voice.

Kramm was an active member of the Pirate Party Germany and was appointed by its board as federal commissioner on copyright issues. In September 2016, Kramm stepped down as party chairman and rejoined Alliance '90/The Greens.

Kramm died on 25 September 2026, at the age of 58, shortly after performing in Granada, Spain.
