= Illuminate (band) =

German band

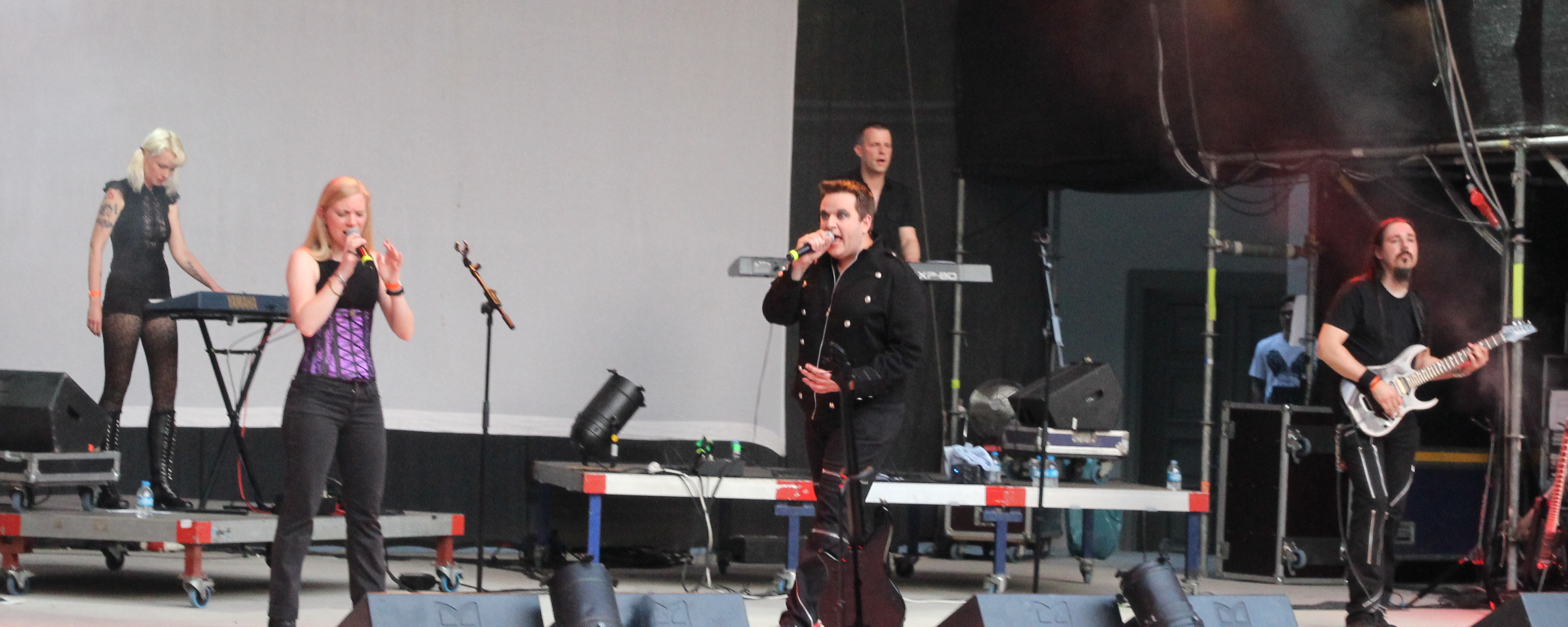
- Illuminate at Wave-Gotik-Treffen 2014

Background information
- Origin: Germany
- Genres: Electropop, gothic rock, dark wave, neoclassical darkwave, Neue Deutsche Todeskunst
- Years active: 1993–present
- Members: Johannes Berthold; Jörn Langenfeld; Johannes Knees; Mareike Makosch; Fenja Makosch
- Past members: Carmen R. Schäfer; Anja Krone; Daniela Dietz; Conny Schindler; Markus Nauli; Sylvia Berthold; Christian Olbert; Laura Dragoi; Ulrike Schneidewind; Cindy Vogel; Mathias Kurth
- Website: illuminate.de

Illuminate was a German band from Karlsruhe formed in 1993 by Johannes Berthold.

== History ==
They played M'era Luna in 2000, 2003 and 2010. Their song "Dunkellicht" was on the German Alternative Charts for eight weeks in 2000, peaking at No. 4. Their 2004 album Augenblicke was released on Nuclear Blast records as well as Johannes Berthold's Gallery label. Ex-Mystic Prophecy Drummer Stefan Dittrich joined the band in 2009 after Mathias Kurth quit for personal reasons

== Musical style ==
Illuminate's early albums are often associated with Neue Deutsche Todeskunst (literally, New German Death Art), especially their 1996 album Verfall. Their music has fewer rock elements and much catchier tunes than more typical Gothic and Darkwave bands. Illuminate's melodies often have piano accompaniment, and their later albums included more electropop elements. Their songs often have themes such as love, loss, longing and the transience of existence.

== Members ==
=== Current ===
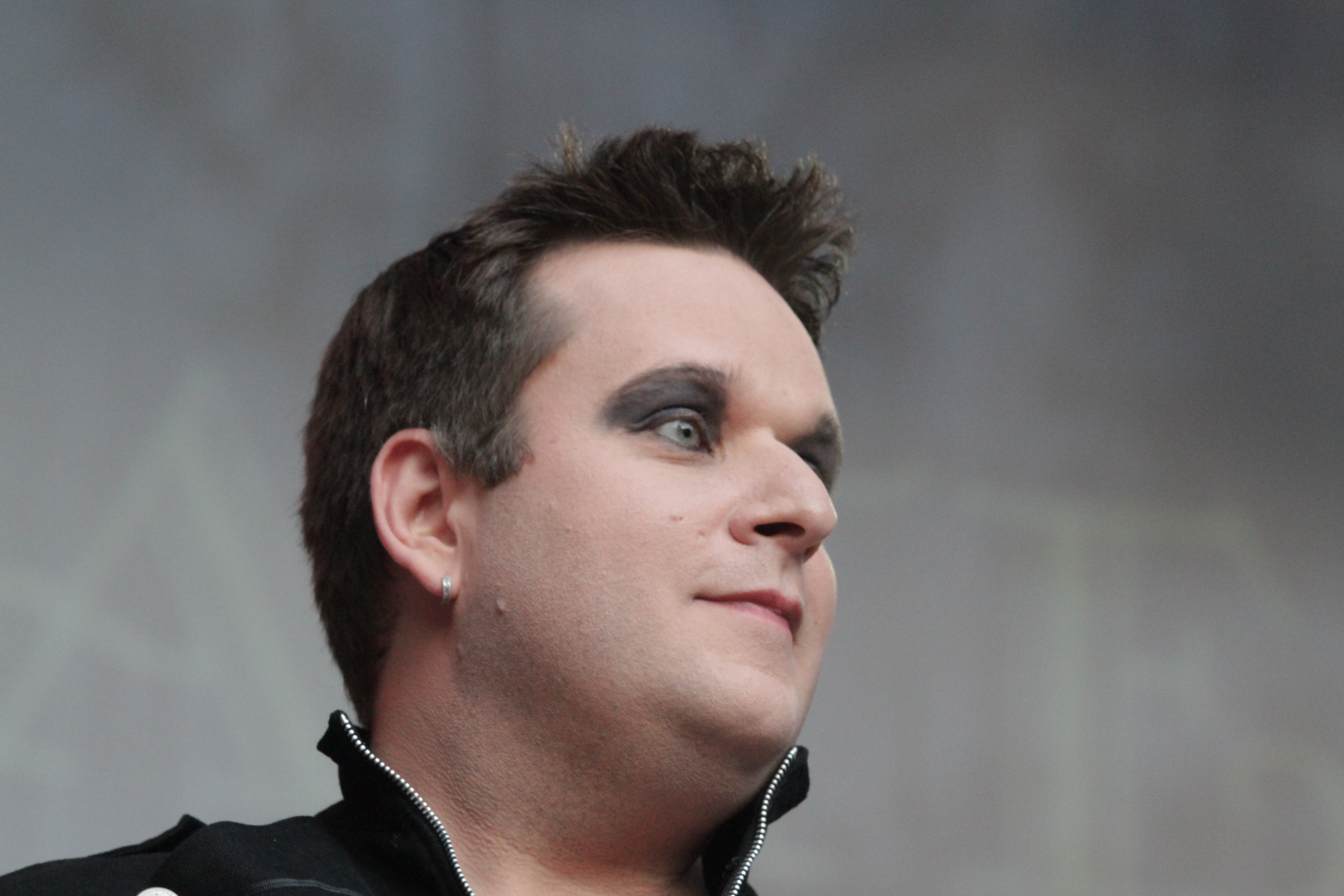
Johannes Berthold (2014)

- Johannes Berthold – Vocals, Piano Keyboards, Programming, Bass Guitar
- Jörn Langenfeld – Guitar
- Johannes Knees – Keyboards
- Mareike Makosch – Vocals
- Fenja Makosch – Vocals

=== Support ===
- Manja Wagner – Vocals
- Sylvia Berthold – Vocals

=== Former ===
- Carmen R. Schäfer – drums
- Conny Schindler – Vocals
- Mathias Kurth – Drums
- Stefan Dittrich – Drums
- Anja Krone – Vocals
- Daniela Dietz – Vocals
- Markus Nauli – Keyboard
- Cindy Vogel – Performer
- Christian Olbert – Performer
- Laura Dragoi – Performer
- Ulrike Schneidewind – Performer

== Discography ==
=== Albums ===
Verfall (1996)
1. Intro - 3:26
2. Apokalypse - 7:00
3. Verfall - 6:13
4. Welke Chrysanthemen - 4:55
5. Love Never Dies! - 6:56
6. Todesengel - 4:30
7. Leidenschaft - 4:59
8. Outro - 3:18
Erinnerungen (1997)
1. Intro: "Der Sturm Fährt Durchs Tal" - 4:36
2. Im Antlitz Der Sonne - 7:43
3. Blütenstaub - 6:17
4. Der Vampir Des Eigenen Herzens - 5:27
5. Epilog: "... Geschweige Denn Ein Wort" - 4:00
6. Intro: "Im Alten Haus" - 3:36
7. Der Torweg - 5:45
8. Die Spieluhr - 6:57
9. Haus Der Zeit - 6:49
10. Outro: "Das Wesen Im Turm" - 3:05
Erwachen (1998)
1. Intro: "Die Rückkehr Des Wesens" - 1:55
2. Ein Erwachen - 5:45
3. Der Traum Des Tänzers (Backing Vocals – Anja Seipold) - 6:10
4. Kühles Wasser - 4:20
5. Geheimes Leben (Vocals – Sonja Schödl) - 6:35
6. Dort Am Fenster - 6:30
7. Traumtanz (Vocals – Peter Herrmann) - 4:45
8. Nazareths Sohn - 7:25
9. Eine Symphonie Des Daseins (Backing Vocals – Peter Herrmann) - 10:51
10. Der Torweg (Live Erfurt "PH" 27 February 1998) - 5:39
Letzter Blick zurück (1999)
1. Intro: "Die Geburt Der Ozeaniden" - 4:35
2. Nur Für Dich - 5:22
3. Stern Der Ungeborenen - 5:35
4. Letzter Blick Zurück - 5:55
5. Energie - 4:57
6. Verlorener Moment - 6:20
7. Zweiter Weg - 6:25
8. In Einer Sommernacht - 6:35
9. Outro: "Cryo" - 5:47
Ein neuer Tag (2000)
1. Intro: "Manchmal Noch..." - 3:23
2. Ein Neuer Tag - 4:49
3. Leuchtfeuer - 3:47
4. Abgeschminkt - 4:36
5. Dunkellicht - 3:44
6. Verlorene Sommer Der Kindheit - 4:12
7. Über Deinem Schlaf - 6:10
8. Jade - 6:00
9. Weg Ins Licht - 4:56
10. Nachtmusik - 5:25
11. Outro: "Alles, Was Blieb" - 4:36
Kaltes Licht (2001)
1. Intro: "Von Eisverwehten Nächten..." - 3:15
2. Eisgang - 4:09
3. Bittersüßes Gift - 5:14
4. Coulez Mes Larmes - 4:24
5. Du Liebst Mich Nicht! - 4:18
6. ...Über Den Kalten Horizont... - 4:52
7. Unerreichte Welt - 4:10
8. Ferne Städte - 5:55
9. Kaltes Verlangen - 6:40
10. Outro: "...Hin Zum Licht Im Eis" - 4:14
11. Der Tanz Beginnt! - 5:14
12. Manchmal Noch... (Dancefloor-Mix) - 3:30
Augenblicke (2004)
1. Intro: "Augenblick... Verweile Doch!" - 2:53
2. Verzeih' Mir! - 3:25
3. Sonnenkind - 4:43
4. Meine Zeit - 4:24
5. Am Ufer - 4:14
6. Abschied - 4:38
7. Ich Glaub' An Dich! - 5:13
8. Ich Kenn' Die Welt Nicht Mehr - 4:46
9. Augenblick - 6:31
10. Outro: "Für Immer Fort" - 3:41
- Bonus Tracks:
- Nach Dem Erwachen - 5:13
- Nach Dem Erwachen (Kurzfilm)
Zwei Seelen (2006)

(2-CD set)
Zwei Seelen	In Metal – Live in Mexico City
1. Geist Aus Der Vergangenheit - 5:58; 2. Wer Lieben Will... - 3:17; 3. Tote Gärten - 3:48; 4. Es Brennt Die Welt - 3:58; 5. Bevor Du Gehst - 4:19; 6. Man Sagt... - 4:06; 7. Kein Hauch Von Leben - 4:26; 8. Siehst Du Mich In Dir? - 5:10; 9. Zwei Seelen - 6:08	1. Intro - 1:32; 2. Verzeih' Mir! - 3:26; 3. Der Torweg - 5:08; 4. Du Liebst Mich Nicht! - 4:14; 5. Es Brennt Die Welt - 4:03; 6. Der Tanz Beginnt - 4:58; 7. Guitar-Solo - 3:09; 8. Ich Kenn' Die Welt Nicht Mehr! - 4:47; 9. Leuchtfeuer - 5:02; 10. Sonnenkind - 4:42; 11. Am Ufer - 4:21; 12. Bittersüßes Gift - 5:32; 13. Augenblick - 6:43

Zeit der Wölfe (2008)
1. Intro: Stiller Schrei - 4:49
2. Sturmwind - 4:19
3. Leben, Wo Gehst Du Hin? - 3:53
4. Zeit Der Wölfe - 4:25
5. Schließ' Die Augen! - 3:37
6. Wenn Alle Engel Fallen - 3:43
7. Menschenwolf - 4:12
8. Ein Letztes Märchen - 6:32
9. Requiem - 8:31
10. Outro: Am Ende Des Weges - 4:25
Ohne Worte (2009)
1. Der Himmel Über Dir - 5:40
2. Schatten Der Vergangenheit (Outro Verfall) - 3:15
3. Ein Morgen Am Meer - 4:56
4. Die Geburt Der Ozeaniden - 4:36
5. Vergessene Träume - 4:33
6. Verlorene Sommer Der Kindheit - 4:04
7. Für Immer Fort - 3:27
8. Der Vorhang Fällt - 5:37
9. Alles, Was Blieb - 4:33
10. Weil Du Es Bist - 3:46
Grenzgang (2011)
- Hinab - 1:27
- Mein Leben Ohne Mich - 6:27

Kapitel 1: Neubeginn

- Gemeinsam - 4:19
- Neuland - 3:51
- Traum Meines Lebens - 4:26

Kapitel 2: Krise

- Nebenrolle - 4:35
- Morgen Ein Stück Weiter - 4:37
- Lauf, Wenn Du Kannst - 5:54

Kapitel 3: Katastrophe

- Götterdämmerung - 4:36
- Am Rande des Seins - 1:42
- Ausgezählt - 4:45
- ...Zurück nach oben - 2:00
ZwischenWelten (2012)
1. Intro "Die im Dunkeln..."
2. ZwischenWelten
3. Du bist alles
4. Neue Welt
5. WoAnders
6. Es gab uns einst
7. Ultima Phoenix
8. Krank
9. Verloren
GeZeichnet (2015)
1. Intro
2. Gezeichnet
3. Wir sind okay!
4. In leeren Räumen
5. Glaubst du?
6. Ich lass' dich nicht mehr los!
7. Die ersten Tropfen fallen
8. Neue Regel
9. Fernab des Weges

=== Compilation albums ===
- 10 x 10 (2003)
- Splitter (2009)

=== Singles ===
- "Poesie" (1993)
- "Es atmet!" (1994)
- "Nur für dich" (1999)
- "Dunkellicht" (2000)
- "Bittersüßes" Gift (2001)
- "GemEinsam" (2011)
