= Neue Deutsche Todeskunst =

Musical genre that developed in Germany in the late 1980s

- Stylistic origins: Dark wave; gothic rock; neoclassical dark wave
- Cultural origins: Late 1980s, Germany
- Typical instruments: Guitar; bass; synthesizer; drums

Other topics
- Neue Deutsche Welle; Music of Germany

Neue Deutsche Todeskunst (NDT, lit. "New German Death Art") is a musical genre that developed in Germany in the late 1980s. It is credited with establishing the German language in the dark wave movement, although there were already such German bands as Xmal Deutschland, Geisterfahrer, and Malaria!.

== History ==
In the late 1980s, a number of German musicians combined music in neo-classical, gothic rock, and darkwave styles with German philosophical texts and a highly theatrical stage show. The music was based on post-punk, cold wave, and gothic rock of bands such as Joy Division, The Cure, and Siouxsie and the Banshees, and the synthesizer-based new wave sound of bands like Depeche Mode. The words often paid deep homage to German philosophers like Andreas Gryphius, Johann Wolfgang von Goethe, Friedrich Nietzsche and Gottfried Benn, as well as international poets such as Georg Trakl, Edgar Allan Poe, Charles Baudelaire, and Jean-Paul Sartre. The concerts of these groups put a great emphasis on costumes, lights and pyrotechnics. The performances were designed to stimulate all the senses and convey an overall dark, brooding atmosphere. Lyrical themes include transience, evil, nihilism, surrealism, expressionism, existential philosophy, criticism of religion, violence, madness, isolation, depression, and especially death. As part of this movement, a number of bands use classical Latin for their lyrics and album names.

The greatest Neue Deutsche Todeskunst hits include "Gottes Tod" by Das Ich (1990), "Verflucht" by Relatives Menschsein (1991), "Der Ketzer" by Lacrimosa (1991), "Das Ende" by Goethes Erben (1992) and "Regentanz" by Endraum (1992). Many NDT artists gravitated to the Danse Macabre record label.

== Origin ==
The expression "Neue Deutsche Todeskunst" was first used in 1991 by Danse Macabre's label magazine MagazinOphon. It was picked up by Sven Freuen, a journalist for the Zillo magazine, who used it to classify bands like Relatives Menschsein, Das Ich and Goethes Erben.

== See also ==
- Neue Deutsche Welle
- Neue Deutsche Härte
