= Goethes Erben =

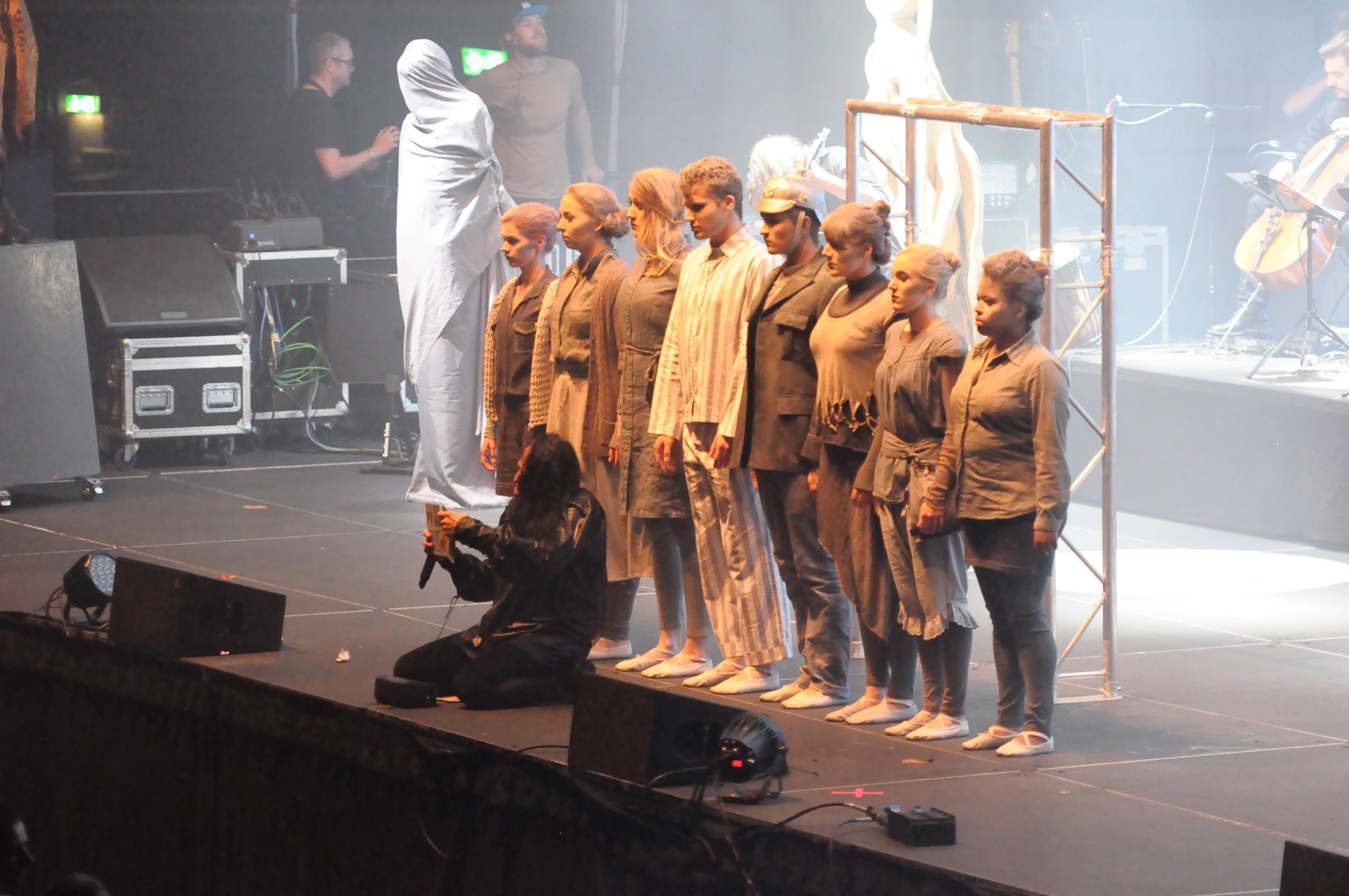
Goethes Erben, Amphi festival 2015

Goethes Erben (Goethe's Heirs) is a musical group from Germany started in 1989 by Oswald Henke and Peter Seipt.

== History ==
The founding idea for Goethes Erben was to combine German spoken words with musical theater. They are one of the first Neue Deutsche Todeskunst bands.

By 1991, Peter had left the band and was replaced by American Mindy Kumbalek in February. Their debut album Das Sterben ist ästhetisch bunt was released in 1991.

The band's unique blend of music and theater lends itself well to multimedia releases, and they have used DVDs with pictures, interviews and concert footage since 2001.

Goethes Erben have established themselves as favorite festival band, playing at M'era Luna 2001, the Eurorock Festival in Belgium, and Wave-Gotik-Treffen 2002. Their album Nichts Bleibt Wie Es War was on the 2002 German Alternative Charts for 7 weeks, peaking at #3.

In July 2006, the band announced that they would have 2 concerts on the 14th and 15 September 2007, and that these would be their last concerts for a long time. The concerts sold out very quickly, and an additional concert was scheduled for September 13. On December 15, 2007, Mindy Kumbalek and Oswald Henke posted an open letter on their website explaining that the band would be going on indefinite hiatus.

== Discography ==
=== Compact Cassettes ===
- 1990 Live
- 1990 Der Spiegel, dessen Weg durch stumme Zeugen zum Ende führt
- 1991 Live - Festival d'Etage
- 1991 Das schwarze Wesen

=== Albums ===
- 1992: Das Sterben ist ästhetisch bunt
- 1992: Der Traum an die Erinnerung
- 1993: Leben im Niemandsland (live recording from June 10, 1993, at Club Zwischenfall, Bochum)
- 1994: Tote Augen sehen Leben
- 1994: Erstes Kapitel (reissue of Der Spiegel, dessen Weg durch stumme Zeugen zum Ende führt and Live Recording)
- 1995: Goethes Erben (The "Blue" Album)
- 1997: Schach ist nicht das Leben
- 1999: Gewaltberechtigt? (re-release of "Die Brut" and "Sitz der Gnade")
- 1999: Kondition: Macht! – Das Musikwerk
- 2001: Nichts bleibt wie es war
- 2005: Dazwischen
- 2018: Am Abgrund

=== Singles ===
- 1993: "Die Brut"
- 1995: "Der Die Das"
- 1997: "Sitz der Gnade"
- 1998: "Marionetten"
- 2001: "Der Eissturm"
- 2001: "Glasgarten"
- 2005: "Alptraumstudio" (500 copy limited edition)
- 2006: "Tage des Wassers" (500 copy limited edition)

=== Other publications ===
- 1996: Live im Planetarium (semi-official, limited to 1000 copies of a live show on September 15, 1995, at the Zeiss Planetarium in Jena)
- 1998: Kondition: Macht! – Das Musiktheaterstück (Live double CD, limited to 2000 copies)
- 1999: Epochenspiel (VHS)
- 1999: Goethes Erben - 10 Jahre (3-CD Box Set, limited to 1000 signed copies)
- 2000: Bittersüß und schmerzvoll (Vinyl, 500 copies)
- 2000: Königlich und doch rebellisch (Vinyl, 500 copies)
- 2000: Gewalttätige Gedanken (Vinyl, 500 copies)
- 2001: 1302 km Island – Auf der Suche nach dem Glasgarten (DVD, limited to 1000 copies)
- 2002: Was war bleibt (DVD, all videos from Nichts bleibt, wie es war to Fleischschuld)
- 2002: Iphigenies Tagebuch
- 2003: Leibhaftig (DVD/CD)
- 2004: Blau Rebell & Gewinn für die Vergangenheit (DVD)
- 2006: Traumaspiele (DVD)
- 2010: Zeitlupe (Best-Of Compilation)
