= Das Ich =

German dark wave/gothic-industrial band

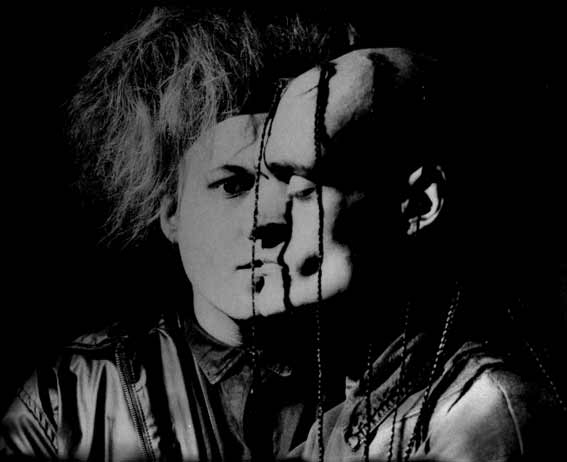

Background information
- Origin: Bavaria, Germany
- Genres: NDT; dark wave; gothic; electro-industrial
- Years active: 1989–present
- Labels: Danse Macabre; Metropolis; Massacre; Etherhaus; Facedown (Europe)
- Members: Stefan Ackermann
- Past members: Bruno Kramm

Das Ich is a German dark wave/gothic-industrial band formed in 1989. The group, fronted by Stefan Ackermann and Bruno Kramm, were one of the prominent founders of and contributors to "Neue Deutsche Todeskunst" (New German Death Art) a musical movement in the early 1990s. The band is known for having a classically inspired gothic-industrial style, for their on-stage theatrics, and their almost exclusive use of German-language lyrics. The German term Das Ich makes reference to the Freudian concept James Strachey translated as "ego" (lit. "The I").

== History ==
Bruno Kramm and Stefan Ackermann met in Bayreuth, Germany in 1989 at a nightclub called the "Crazy Elephant". Bruno had already been involved in several band projects, and after some hours of socializing the two decided to begin a project together.

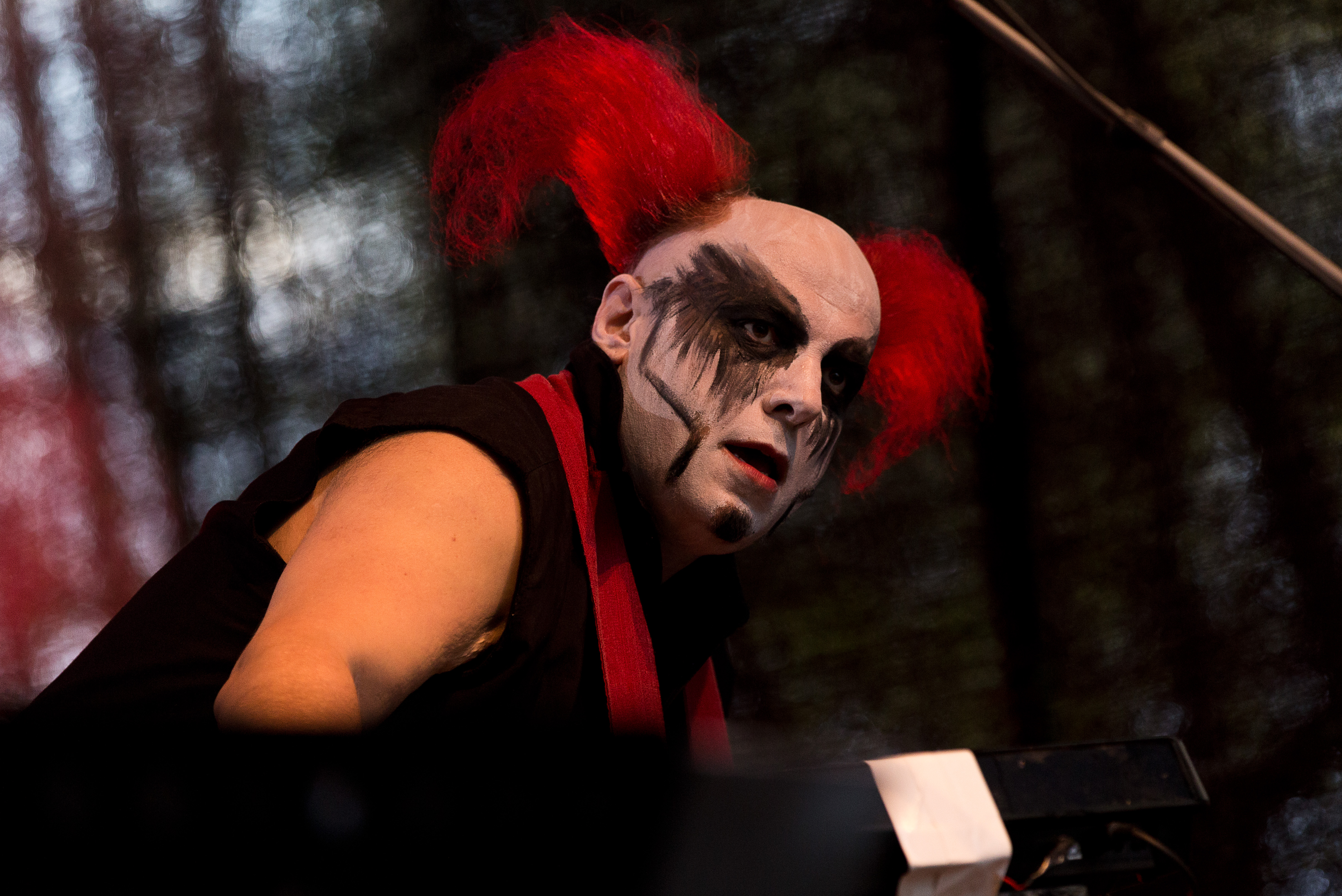
Bruno Kramm at the 10. Nocturnal Culture Night festival (2015)

In 1989, the members of Das Ich founded the Danse Macabre record label which released their first EP, Satanische Verse, and their first album, Die Propheten. Die Propheten was released in Germany in 1991 and was reissued in the US in 1997, selling over 30,000 copies. Their second album, Staub, was released in 1994 and charted in Germany for 11 weeks. 1994 also saw the release of the Stigma EP which featured a more industrial-dance sound with remixes of the album track "Von der Armut." The band played many live shows in Europe but made its first US tour in June 1995 and a second, longer US tour of 13 shows, in 1997.

In 1998, the album Egodram, saw the group moving towards a more rhythmic, industrial dance-oriented sound, resulting in the club singles "Kindgott" and "Destillat". The album was followed by a tour in 1998 in the US and Mexico. Later in 1998, the band released their next album, Morgue, a concept album with lyrics based on the poems of expressionist writer Gottfried Benn.

In 1999, they released a remix album, Re-Laborat, that included Das Ich songs remixed by popular electro-industrial bands including And One, Funker Vogt, Wumpscut, and VNV Nation. The album ranked #31 on the German Alternative Chart's Top 50 Albums chart for 1999, while the U.S. re-issue peaked at #7 on the CMJ RPM Charts in 2001. Bruno Kramm released his solo spin-off Coeur in 2000.

In 2002, Das Ich released the album Antichrist, which is a critical reflection on world politics post-9-11. In 2003, the best-of album Relikt was released.

In 2004, they released the double album Lava, made of:
Lava:Glut: Disc with more instrumental than industrial tracks.
Lava:Asche: Disc with dance versions of songs from Lava:Glut.
Lava:Addendum: Bonus DVD packaged with some versions of the release.

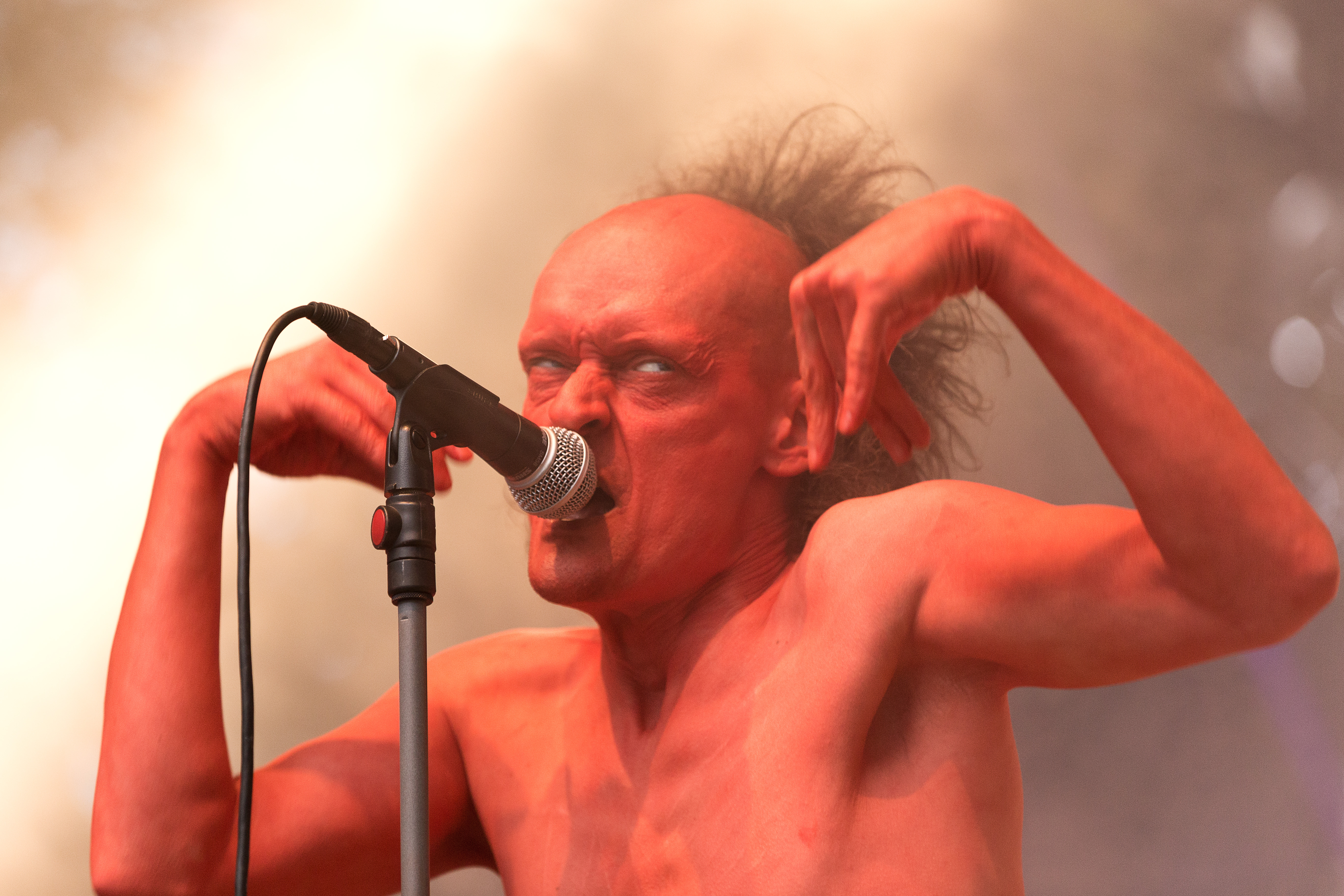
Stefan Ackermann at the 10. Nocturnal Culture Night festival (2015)

In 2006, they released an additional dual album:
Cabaret: Disc with circus style songs, like the name implies, and more instrumental.
Varieté: Disc with versions of songs from Cabaret remixed by bands including Stillste Stund, Metallspürunde, FabrikC, etc. In the same year, they released a new DVD, Panopticum.

After 2010, the band underwent a short hiatus due to the health problems suffered by lead singer Stefan Ackermann, but the band had a revival with their performance at the Wave-Gotik-Treffen in 2013.

In 2017, the band remastered and re-released their first EP, Satanische Verse, as a limited-edition (500 copies) vinyl with additional tracks.

In 2018, an announcement about creating new album appeared on official website, originally scheduled for release in 2017 or 2018, that has yet to be released.

In March 2023, the band announced a South American tour — the seventh of their career — beginning in São Paulo, Brazil.

On 20 June 2025, they announced the date "31.10.2025" through a short video on social media pointing that they would release a new album titled Fanal on October 31st after nearly two decades without new music. Later on, in August and September they released two singles: Lazarus and Brutus, which featured a female voiceover at the beginning stating that they would not release Fanal on Spotify or any streaming platforms. The voiceover was later removed. The album explores topics such as misanthropy, nihilism, societal decay, and the critique of power. They cite Friedrich Nietzsche, Gottfried Benn, and the German Expressionist movement as direct influences. Band member Bruno Kramm has stated that Fanal is a response to our post-factual age and a time "when belief counts more than facts".

Kramm died on 25 September 2026, at the age of 58, shortly after performing in Granada, Spain.

== Band members ==
=== Current members ===
- Stefan Ackermann – lead vocals (1989–present)

=== Past members ===
- Bruno Kramm – keyboards, synthesizers, programming, backing vocals (1989–2026; his death)

=== Live band members ===
- Stefan Siegl (Sissy) (2006)
- Kain Gabriel Simon (2000–2006, 2016)
- Daniel Galda (1994–1999)
- Chad Blinman (1994–1996)
- Jakob Lang (1998–1999)
- Michael Schmid (1999–2000)
- Ringo Müller (2006)
- Damian "Plague" Hrunka (2000–2008)
- Martin Söffker - keyboards, backing vocals (2008–present)

== In film ==
Music by Das Ich made up the soundtrack of the movie Das Ewige Licht ("The Eternal Light"), directed and produced by Hans Helmut Häßler. The soundtrack was released as Das innere Ich in 1996.

== Discography ==
=== Studio albums ===
- 1990: Satanische Verse ("Satanic Verses")
- 1991: Die Propheten ("The Prophets") (re-released in 2009)
- 1994: Staub ("Dust")
- 1998: Egodram
- 1998: Morgue
- 2002: Anti'christ
- 2004: LAVA:Glut ("LAVA:Ember")
- 2006: Cabaret (limited box set issued featuring remix album Varieté and DVD Panopticum)
- 2025: Fanal

=== Extended plays ===
- 2008: Kannibale

=== Remix albums ===
- 2000: Re-Laborat
- 2004: LAVA:Asche (remixes of Lava:Glut; "LAVA:Ash")

=== Singles ===
- 1994: "Stigma"
- 1998: "Kindgott" ("Child God")
- 1998: "Destillat"

=== Soundtracks ===
- 1996: Das innere Ich ("The Inner Self")
- 1997: Wing Commander Prophecy Video Game OST ("The Awakening")

=== Compilations ===
- 1999: Re-Kapitulation (compilation, US only)
- 2003: Relikt (compilation; "Relic")
- 2007: Alter Ego (best-of compilation)
- 2007: Addendum (compilation of remixes, rare tracks and alternate versions)

=== Live albums ===
- 1995: Feuer ("Fire")

=== Video ===
- 2002: Momentum (VCD/DVD)

=== Side projects ===
- 1995: Die Liebe (feat. Atrocity, LP; "The Love")
- 2000: Coeur (CD) (solo project released as "Kramm")
