= Biohazzard Records =

German independent record label

Biohazzard Records is a German Independent record label founded by music journalist Sascha Bahn and Alexander C.H. Lorenz.

Biohazzard is a sublabel of Danse Macabre Records. Its distribution companies are AL!VE and Kontor Media (digital distribution).

Since late 2007 the label has distributed promotional mp3 songs with BitTorrent. Biohazzard disapproves of restrictive rights like DRM and distribute all their material without Digital Rights Management.

Schatten. TV is one of the oldest and largest German scene-television-company's which publish interviews of bands, important people around the gothic-scene over an own Internet Television channel. They have had an Internet Radio station since January 2008.

== Releases ==
- 2000: Sinnflut - Vergessene Melodien
- 2001: Sinnflut - Wortlosigkeit
- 2003: Silence - The p/o/u/r letters
- 2003: Sinnflut - Gefüge (Part I & II)
- 2004: Sinnflut - Im Anblick meines Augenblicks
- 2006: Eisenfunk - Funkferngesteuert
- 2006: Sanity Obscure - Resurrection
- 2007: Silence - the badtime stories e.p.
- 2007: Eisenfunk - Eisenfunk
- 2007: adoptedCHILD - geliebt-getötet (Digital Release)
- 2008: Agapèsis - Sacrilege
- 2008: MUMM! Compilation One - head//shot
- 2008: Piscide - elekktroshokk
- 2008: Sinnflut - Epik
- 2008: Eisenfunk - 300 (limited Edition)
- 2008: concrete/rage - [un]natural

== Artists ==
- Eisenfunk
- Silence
- Sinnflut
- Concrete/Rage
- Noctiferia
