= Empire of Dark Salvation =

2005 studio album by Gothminister

Studio album by Gothminister
- Released: April 4, 2005
- Recorded: 2004
- Studio: Satan Studios, Sarpsborg; Is It Art? Studios, Kølviken
- Genre: Gothic metal, gothic rock, industrial metal
- Length: 40:00; 52:55 (with Live Video)
- Language: English
- Label: BMG, Drakkar, e-Wave, Tatra, Tuba
- Producer: Rico Darum, Peder "Goatfather" Kjellsby, and Gothminister

Gothminister chronology
Gothic Electronic Anthems (2003)	Empire of Dark Salvation (2005)	Happiness in Darkness (2008)

Empire of Dark Salvation is the second studio album by Norwegian gothic metal band Gothminister. It was released in 2005. It was rereleased in 2014 by the German record label, AFM records.

== Track listing ==
All tracks are written by Bjørn Alexander Brem.

No.	Title	Length
1.	"Dark Salvation"	4:05
2.	"Welcome"	0:41
3.	"Monsters"	3:12
4.	"The Calling"	3:36
5.	"Daughter of S"	0:34
6.	"Forgotten"	3:59
7.	"Nachtzehrer"	5:33
8.	"Leviathan"	4:25
9.	"Swallowed by the Earth"	4:53
10.	"We Die in Dreams"	3:19
11.	"Gates of Salvation"	0:20
12.	"Happiness in Darkness"	5:23
Total length:		40:00

=== Live video ===
No.	Title	Length
1.	"Dark Salvation"
2.	"Hatred" (with Eric Burton)
3.	"Monsters"
Total length:		12:55

== Notes ==
- Drum recording by Lars Klokkerhaug in Sub Sonic Society Studios, Oslo
  Live sound recordings by Guido Fricke at M'Era Luna Festival 2004 in Hildesheim, Germany
