= Danse Macabre Records =

German record label

- Founded: 1989
- Founder: Bruno Kramm, Norbert Juhas
- Genre: Futurepop, hellektro, Neue Deutsche Härte, Neue Deutsche Todeskunst, alternative rock, darkwave, dark electro, Gothic, Gothic rock, Gothic metal, coldwave
- Country of origin: Germany
- Location: Wirsberg, Germany
- Official website: http://www.dansemacabre.de

Danse Macabre Records is a record label based in Wirsberg, Germany and founded by members of Das Ich. It gained popularity in the early 1990s, at the same time that the German Dark Wave movement experienced a marked upswing.

== Deutsche Alternative Charts ==
Danse Macabre has had several albums chart on the DAC over the years:

Year	Album	Artist	Peak Position	Weeks on the DAC
2006	XtraX Clubtrax Vol. 2	Various Artists	2	5
2007	XtraX Clubtrax Vol. 2	Various Artists	?	8
2008	Eisenfunk	Eisenfunk	2	8
2008	A Stranger To Tears	The Beauty Of Gemina	3	8
2008	Terror From The Sky	Suicide Booth	4	8
2008	11:11	Inline.Sex.Terror	7	7
2009	Dark Alliance Vol. 3	Various Artists	1	8
2009	Schmerzfrequenz	Eisenfunk	2	8
2009	Skold Vs. KMFDM	Tim Skold & Sascha Konietzko	3	8
2009	Chaos Nation	Concrete/Rage	3	8
2009	Sehn:Sucht	Stereomotion	5	8
2009	Ausverkauf	QEK Junior	6	8

== Roster ==
According to the label's website on 20 septembre 2026

- A Pale Moon
- A.T.Mödell
- Adrian H. & The Wounds
- Aeternitas
- Ari Mason
- Astari Nite
- Beati Mortui
- Berliner Bomben Chor
- Bettina Bormann
- Blitzmaschine
- Butzemann
- Cell Division
- Christ Vs. Warhol
- Cold Cold Ground
- ConcreteRage
- Dark Minimal Project
- Das Ich
- Deathless Legacy
- Defence Mechanism
- Delica-m
- Desdemona
- Devilskiss
- Eden Weint Im Grab
- Effter
- Eisenfunk
- ErilaZ
- Extinction Front
- Faith & The Muse
- Felsenreich
- Gothika
- Gothminister
- Hardwire
- Irrlicht
- Masquerade
- Metallspürhunde
- Midnight Caine
- Model Kaos
- Monica Richards
- Nano Infect
- Nehl Aëlin
- Nova-Spes
- Oberer Totpunkt
- Opioids
- Otto Dix
- Partly Faithful
- Place4tears
- PTYL
- Rabbit at War
- Schneewittchen
- Schwarzbund
- Shadow Image
- Silent Scream
- Stereomotion
- Stoneman
- Substaat
- Sweet Sister Pain
- Symbiotic Systems
- Synthetica
- The Beauty of Gemina
- The Breath Of Life
- The Daughters of Bristol
- The Drowning Man
- The Flood
- The Mescaline Babies
- The Raven
- The Spiritual Bat
- Theodor Bastard
- Tragic Black
- Unterschicht
- Vic Anselmo
- Virgin in Veil
- Waves under Water
- X-In June
