= Gothic Electronic Anthems =

Studio album by Gothminister
- Released: April 14, 2003
- Recorded: 2002–2003
- Studios: Refried Studios, Norway; Oas Bunker, Norway; Is It Art Studios, Sweden
- Genres: Gothic metal, industrial metal, gothic rock
- Length: 39:03
- Language: English
- Labels: BMG, Drakkar, Soulfood, Tatra
- Producers: Bjørn Alexander Brem, Machine

Gothminister chronology
Angel Demo (2001)	Gothic Electronic Anthems (2003)	Empire of Dark Salvation (2005)

Gothic Electronic Anthems is the debut studio album by Norwegian gothic metal band Gothminister, released in 2003. The album was rereleased in 2014 by the German music label AFM records.

== Track listing ==
All tracks are written by Bjørn Alexander Brem.

No.	Title	Length
1.	"Gothic Anthem"	3:48
2.	"Angel"	3:31
3.	"The Holy One"	4:33
4.	"Pray"	3:29
5.	"The Possession"	1:18
6.	"Devil"	3:05
7.	"Shadows of Evil Sins"	3:35
8.	"Hatred"	3:33
9.	"March of the Dead"	4:11
10.	"Wish" (Additional Vocals by Nell Sigland)	4:13
11.	"Post Ludium"	3:22
Total length:		39:03

European edition bonus track
No.	Title	Length
12.	"Angel (Club Version)"	4:48
Total length:		43:51

== Personnel ==
Band

- Bjørn Alexander Brem - vocalsv, instruments
- Bjørn Aadland - guitar
- Goatfather - guitar, choir
- Rico Darum - guitar
- Sjur "Sick" Miljeteig - choir

Production

- Sandra Jensen - art direction, design, photography
- Bjørn Alexander Brem - programming
- Andy Moxnes - producer, recording, programming (Additional)
- Peder Kjellsby - producer, recording, programming (Additional)
- Rico Darum - producer, recording, programming (Additional)
- Sjur Miljeteig - producer, recording, programming (Additional)
- Superdead - producer, recording, programming (Additional)
- Thrawn Llåvslaavk - mastering
