= Sinnflut (band) =

Musical project

SINNFLUT
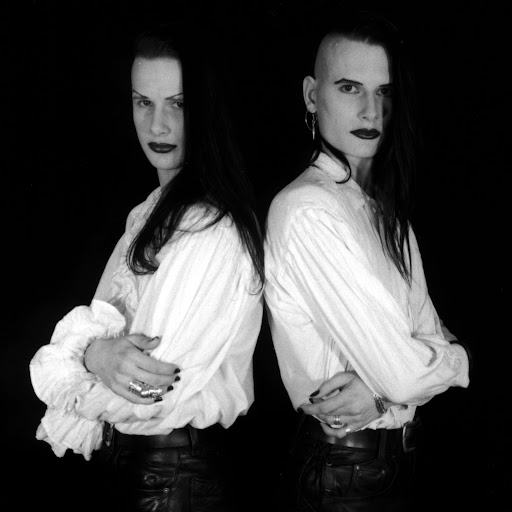
- Original band line-up SINNFLUT 1998

Background information
- Origin: Saxony, Germany
- Genres: Dark wave, gothic rock, electronic music, neoclassical
- Years active: 1998–present
- Labels: Icare Media; 2007 Biohazzard Records; 2021 Danse Macabre Records
- Members: Manuel Bartsch
- Past members: Magnus Bartsch
- Website: www.traenendes-herz.com

Sinnflut is a German band. The name means flood of sense. The pronunciation is similar to the Great Flood and plays with meaning of the church.

== History ==
From its beginning, Sinnflut has had only two members - Magnus Bartsch, songwriter, vocalist and piano player, and Manuel Bartsch, songwriter, vocalist, lyricist and programmer. The band is mostly associated with "Neue Deutsche Todeskunst" (New German Death Art) along with Das Ich and Relatives Menschsein. Since their first release "Vergessene Melodien" they were valid as sleeper in their genre.

== Other work ==
Manuel Bartsch also wrote the soundtrack for The Alps Experience - Across the Alps on a mountainbike, a documentary film by Roland Schymik (2004, 2007).

== Discography ==
- 2021 - SCHNEE
- 2008 - Epik
- 2004 - Im Anblick meines Augenblicks
- 2003 - GEFÜGE 1
- 2003 - GEFÜGE 2
- 2001 - Das Vermächtnis
- 2001 - Wortlosigkeit
- 2000 - Vergessene Melodien

=== Sampler ===
- 2005 Voices of Darkness II
- 2004 SL-Sampler 1
- 2004 Voices of Darkness
- 2002 Astan Sampler 15

== Articles ==
- Amboss-Mag (Reviews, Interviews)
- Obliveon (Reviews, Interviews)
- Darkweb (Review)
