= Fatum Aeternum =

Israeli rock and metal band

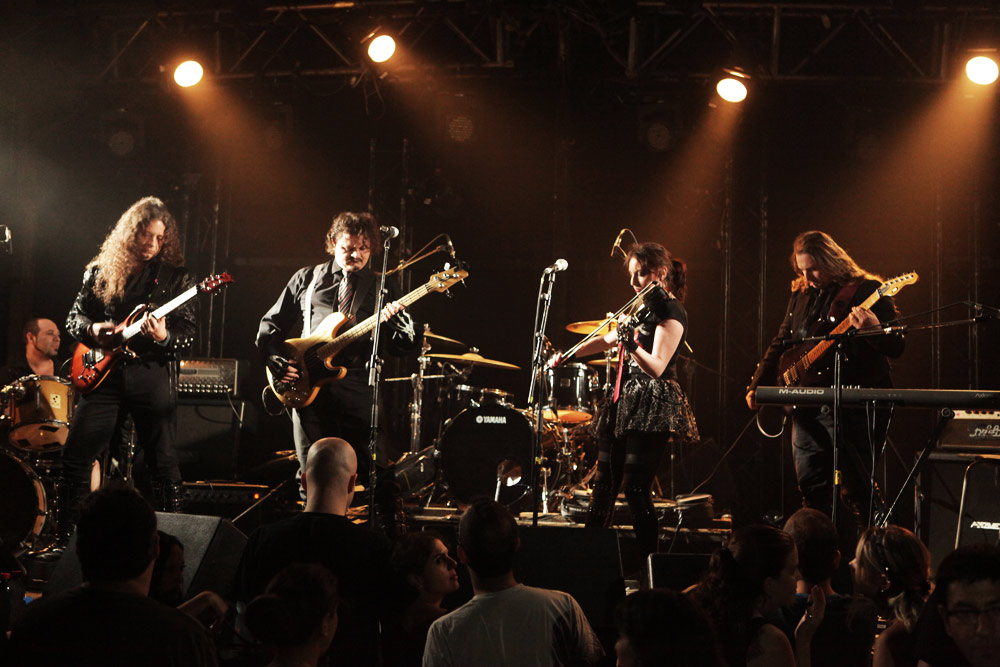

Background information
- Origin: Tel Aviv, Israel
- Genres: Crossover metal, gothic metal, doom metal
- Years active: 2006–present
- Members: Steve Gershin; Evelyn Shor; George Falk
- Past members: Olga Braverman; Ze'ev Gut; Ilya Surnin; Alexey Yudin; Vadim Schuhmann; Rivka Aizenberg; Mark Muzykant; Kirill Beznosov; Tal Leshetz; Dan Yoffe; Igor Sherman; Vadim Weinstein; Igor May
- Website: www.fatum-aeternum.com

Fatum Aeternum (Lt.: "Fate Eternal") is an Israeli gothic rock and gothic metal band, founded in 2006. The band went through major line-up changes during its first years, until the current line-up formed. Up to date, the band released 3 EPs, 1 full-length album and a Maxi-Single, including international collaborations and performances. The band shared the stage with bands like Waves under Water, Diary of Dreams and Apoptygma Berzerk.

== Early history ==
The band first gathered as a folk band consisted of Steve Gershin (mandolin, bass and vocal), Ze'ev Gut (fiddle and vocal) and Olga Braverman (flute and vocal), describing them as renaissance metal, due to frequent use of renaissance and medieval motives, played in a metal-crossover style, using such instruments as mandolin, fiddle and flute. The very first line-up was completed by Iliya Surnin (drums), Dan Yoffe (guitar) and Rivka Aizenberg (viola). The band became immediately active with live performances, which offered them an invitation to a music festival at the Sea of Galilee, Kursik 2006, which was a popular event arranged by and for the Russian-speaking community of Israel. During the years 2006–2009, Steve Gershin wrote songs and worked on them with the constantly changing line-up, performing in various venues in Israel. Olga decided to quit the band in 2007, followed by the departure of Ze'ev in 2008. He remained a good friend of the band, participating in various concerts and recordings as guest musician. For reasons of practicality and economy, Fatum Aeternum changed from being a fully live band to become a partially live band, with all keyboards and classical instruments recorded onto a backing tape.

== Dark Glamour and hiatus ==
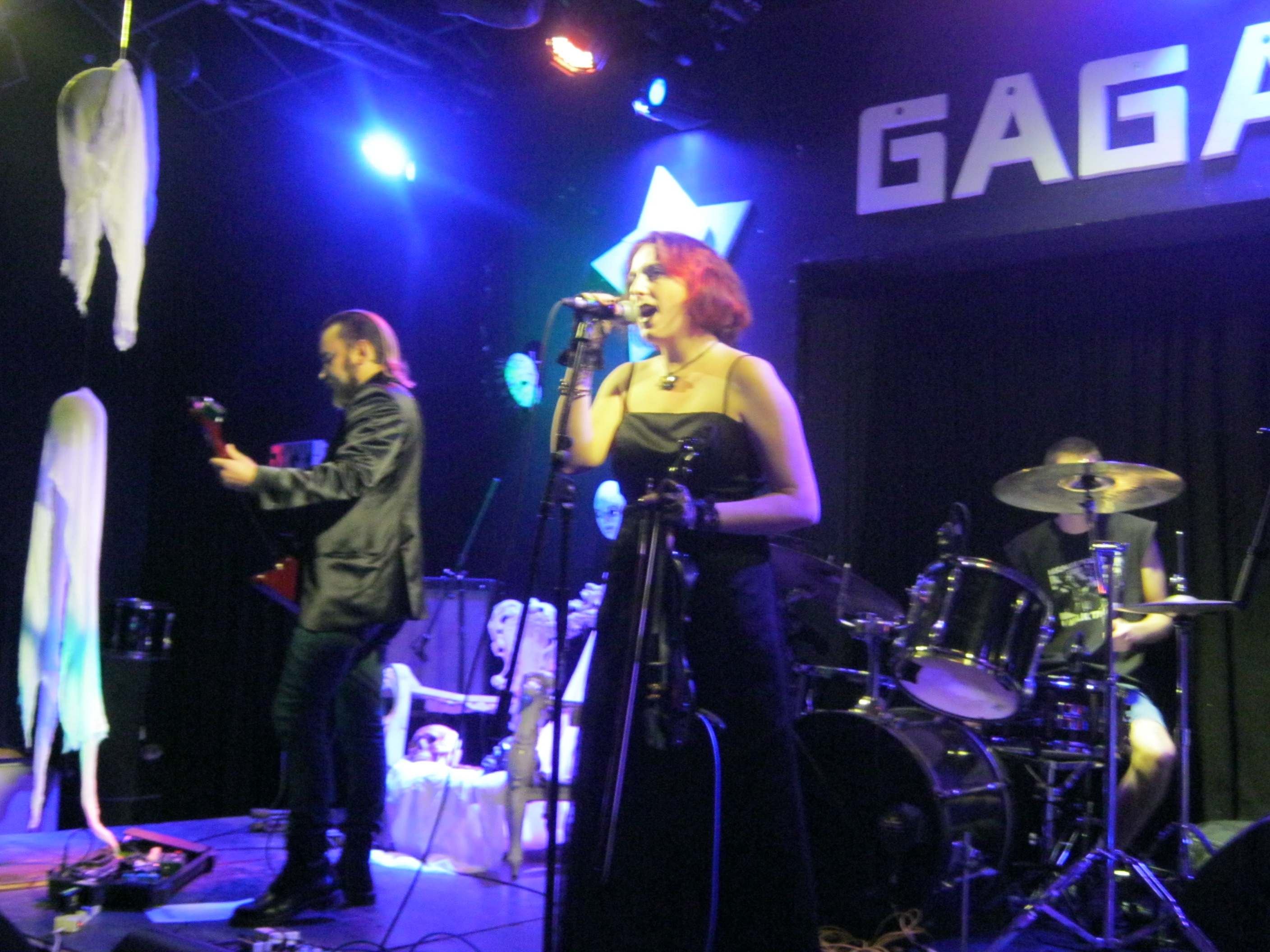
Fatum Aeternum 2015, Tel-Aviv

During that time, the EP "Dark Glamour" was recorded in pop rock/synthpop genre, which surprised the band's audience. The next unexpected twist was the desire of Steve to perform no matter what, which he achieved by doing intimate acoustic performances around Israel, accompanied by different musicians each time. Later, Steve stated that the reason for the instability was the desire of each band member to be in the center of attention, which failed to be fulfilled. In 2009 Steve got tired of the instability in the band, and decided to disband Fatum Aeternum.

== This Dream is Dead ==
Steve decided to record songs that were played during the years, to create a "memorial album", which was well reflected on this release. Eventually, the album became a fresh start for the band, characterized by stable line-up. Dan Yoffe and Igor Sherman were invited to play the guitar parts, and Evelyn Shor, a violinist and vocalist, was invited for recording the female vocals, and eventually stayed as a permanent member. From this point and on, all the new material was created with the participation of all band members. During 2010 the band worked on the album, as well as performing in various venues over Israel. The album was re-recorded and changed many times, first released as a digital release only. But the band wasn't satisfied with the result, and kept working on it until 2011, when it was officially released as a CD. The band decided to self-release it, without seeking a record deal. The album received cold shower from the critics around Europe, claiming it has catastrophic-muddy production, standard keyboard and violin sounds, powerless riffs and boring midtempo songs.

In 2011 Fatum Aeternum held its first international appearance, performing on the annual, 12th Gothic Festival "Children of the Night" in Kyiv, Ukraine on September 24. The band shared the stage with known acts, such as Waves under Water and Diary of Dreams. The show received warm feedback from the local press:

"Especially rocked the Israeli Fatum Aeternum (dark metal), since they were the only guests of the festival where violin was heard. The stage had turned to a real hell and the heat were taking on the musicians themselves, as well as the audience which danced gladly and happily took the wave of music and raved to the rhythmic guitar riffs. The vocalist\bassist himself was so heated up by the performance that he started to take off his costume, and indeed, it was pretty hot for him, wearing the heavy leather coat, but his image, along with the fine figure, he left a great impression. In contrast to him, the female vocalist\violinist looked like a little fragile fairy-girl, which moved quickly on the stage, flickering here and there through the stage smoke. And though the band started the performance from a welcome speech in English, it turned out later that they speak fluent Russian, which brought the audience even closer to the guest-stars."

— SHODKA portal, 2011

"The next guests of the festival were from Israel. The virtuosic band Fatum Aeternum. It is worth mentioning, that prior their performance, the musicians hanged out in the crowd, and behaved just like any regular visitors – they communicated, danced, and enjoyed themselves. The crowd was ready for more entertainment and dancing, so it greeted them with shouts and applause. The Israelis started their performance very lovely, with the words that they're happy to be in Kyiv, and that they thinks that the autumn in the city is beautiful, especially when leaves are turning to yellow. And of course, they really enjoyed the city and were happy to be here. It is notable, that both the vocalists spoke Russian perfectly. But it turned to be not their only talent. The back-vocalist, who's also the guitarist had heated up the audience in an original way – after a few songs he took off his tie, later – his cloak, and by the end of the show he even unbuttoned his shirt. The crowd went crazy, and the fans cheered up. In general, the show was simply beautiful. The female vocalist played the electric violin amazingly, and the delicate blend of heavy music and trembling violin was mind-blowing."

— Best Club – Internet Music Portal, 2011

== 2012 ==
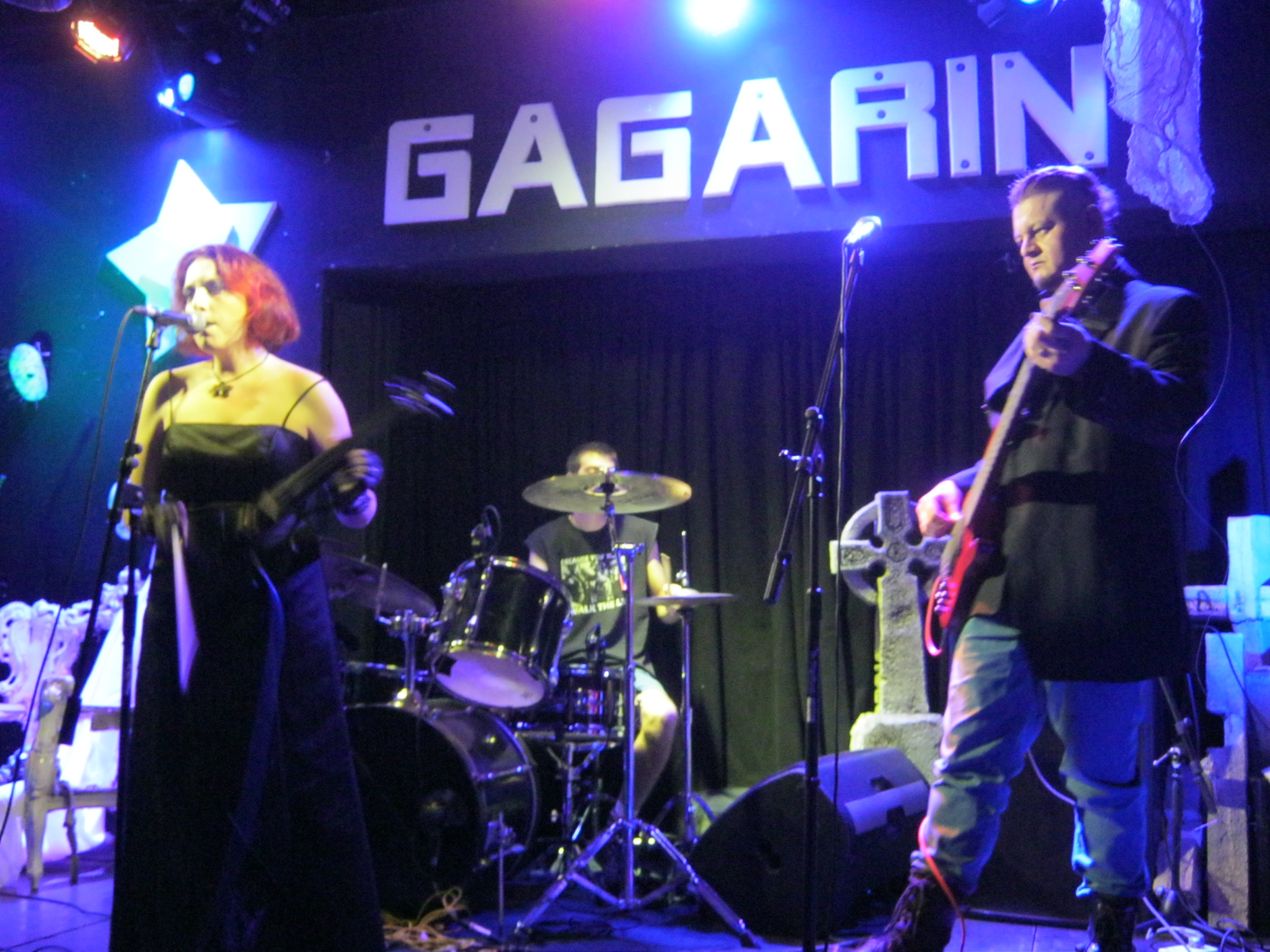
Fatum Aeternum 2015, Tel-Aviv

In 2012, the band filmed a first video, presenting a strong visual of the message hidden behind the song "Apocalypse Now". The video was launched on YouTube on April 6. It was submitted for broadcast on MTV Israel in June, and broadcast on the last episode in "Betzefer's Headbangers Ball" show on June 28.
In the second half of the year, the band recorded its next EP The Sermon. The recording took place in The Lodge Recording Studio in Northampton, UK, which had a rich resume, including Kim Wilde, Paradise Lost, Fields of the Nephilim and others. The drummer chosen for the session was Matt Snowden, who had excellent credits as a session drummer and sound engineer, previously worked with Amy Winehouse, Pete Townshend, Julian Lennon, MTV /Comedy Central, Faith and Hope Records, and others. The EP was self-released in September 2012.

The same month, Fatum Aeternum performed as a warm-up act for the Norwegian Electronic rock band Apoptygma Berzerk.

By the end of the year, it became obvious that the band's progress reached dead end, and it was decided to split up. 2013 was a year of hiatus.

== 2014 ==
In early 2014 Steve and Evelyn welcomed aboard two new band members: George Falk and Igor May.

In April the band released their new single "One Bastard" followed by local gigs.

== 2015 ==
In early 2015 the band released a maxi Single "The Pain" and an EP "The Darkest Hour".

== Members ==
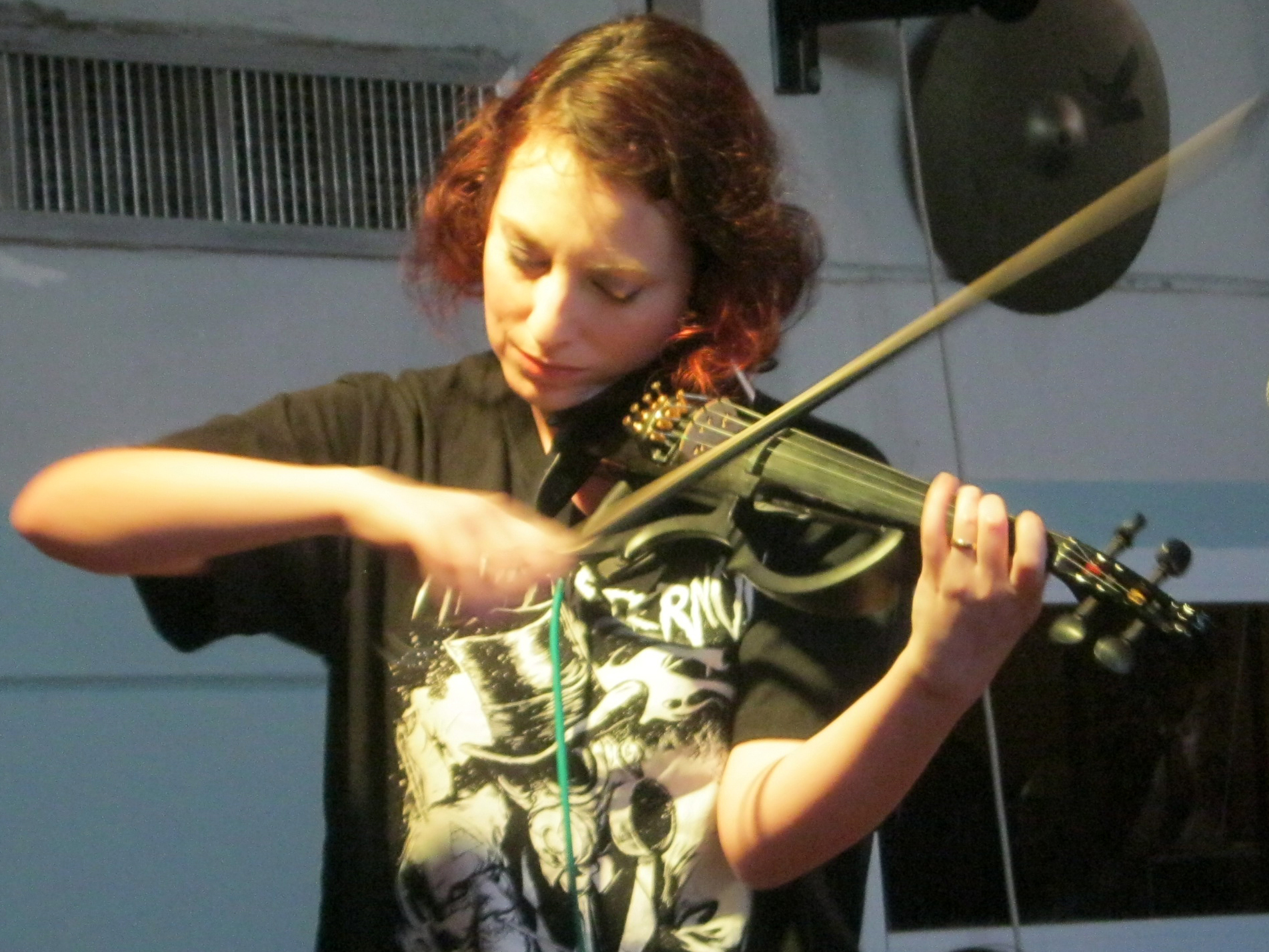
Evelyn Shor, 2016

=== Current line-up ===
- Steve Gershin (vocal, bass, keyboards)
- Evelyn Shor (vocal, violin)
- Mark Muzykant (drums)
- Alex Zvulun (Guitar)

=== Past members ===
- Olga Braverman (vocal, flute)
- Ze'ev Gut (vocal, violin, mandolin, viola pomposa)
- Ilya Surnin (drums)
- Alexey Yudin (guitar)
- Vadim Schuhmann (drums)
- Rivka Rozenberg (viola)
- Kirill Beznosov (guitar)
- Tal Leshetz (drums)
- Igor May (drums)
- George Falk (guitar)

== Discography ==
=== EP ===
- Dark Glamour (2008)
- The Sermon (2012)
- The Pain (Maxi-Single) (2014)
- The Darkest Hour (2015)
- Mass Suicide of Human Race (2017)
- Singing Songs of Desperation (2020)

=== Albums ===
- This Dream is Dead (2011)
