= Anima Inferna =

Studio album by Gothminister
- Released: 25 March 2011
- Genre: Gothic metal, industrial metal
- Length: 40:09
- Language: English
- Label: BMG, Drakkar, e-Wave

Gothminister chronology
Happiness in Darkness (2008)	Anima Inferna (2011)	Utopia (2013)

Professional ratings
Review scores
Source	Rating
Metal Storm	7.3

Anima Inferna is the fourth studio album by Norwegian gothic metal band Gothminister. The album came in a standard jewel case, as well as the limited edition "Box From Hell" released in Germany, which came with a limited digipak version of Anima Inferna, a T-shirt (available in M, L, XL sizes), and a 32+1 Gothminister Draw- poker gambling card deck, from Alterburger. The album was produced by Grammy Award winner Neil Kernon. It was rereleased in 2014 through AFM Records.

== Track listing ==
All tracks are written by Bjørn Alexander Brem

No.	Title	Length
1.	"Stonehenge"	5:20
2.	"Liar"	3:39
3.	"Juggernaut"	5:42
4.	"616"	3:22
5.	"Solitude"	3:27
6.	"The Beauty of Fanatism"	4:16
7.	"Anima Inferna"	4:09
8.	"Fade"	0:54
9.	"The Beast"	3:54
10.	"Hell Opens the Gates"	1:45

Bonus track
No.	Title	Length
11.	"Liar" (Goatmanifest Remix)	3:39

== Personnel ==
Band

- Bjørn Alexander Brem - vocals
- Eirik "Pezzmaur" Øien - bass
- Ketil Eggum - guitar
- Glenn Nilsen - guitar
- Christian Svendsen - drums

Additional members

- M.J.K. – Additional vocals (tracks: 2, 3, 6)

Production

- Bjørn Alexander Brem - editing, programming, producer
- Peder Kjellsby - programming
- Neil Kernon - mixing
- Alan Douches - mastering
- Mina Winter - cover
