= Happiness in Darkness =

Studio album by Gothminister
- Released: 25 November 2008
- Studio: Deadends Rehearsal Room; Caliban Studios
- Genre: Gothic metal, industrial metal, electronic rock
- Length: 38:31; 50:59 (with live video)
- Language: English
- Label: AFM Records, E-Wave Records, Drakkar, Irond
- Producer: Bjørn Alexander Brem; Rico Darum

Gothminister chronology
Empire of Dark Salvation (2005)	Happiness in Darkness (2008)	Anima Inferna (2011)

Professional ratings
Review scores
Source	Rating
Reflections of Darkness	8/10

Happiness in Darkness is the third studio album by Norwegian gothic metal band Gothminister, released 25 November 2008 through German record label E-Wave Records. The album was rereleased in 2014 by AFM records.

== Track listing ==
All tracks are written by Bjørn Alexander Brem, except where noted

No.	Title	Writer(s)	Length
1.	"Dusk Till Dawn"		4:42
2.	"Darkside"		3:56
3.	"Your Saviour" (with Nell Sigland)		3:50
4.	"Freak"		4:02
5.	"Sideshow"		4:59
6.	"The Allmighty" (with Sigland)		2:07
7.	"Beauty After Midnight"		4:20
8.	"Emperor" (with Sigland)		4:26
9.	"Mammoth"		3:45
10.	"Thriller"	Rod Temperton	3:45

Live video
No.	Title	Length
1.	"Forgotten"
2.	"Gothic Anthem"
3.	"Devil"
Total length:		12:28

- Tracks 3, 6, and 8 have additional vocals by Ragnhild Westgaard "Nell" Sigland
- Live Video Clips are taken from M'Era Luna Festival 2006 in Hildesheim, Germany
- An extended version of track 10 exists that includes a three-minute outro, ending with the second half of Vincent Price's spoken-word sequence from the original Michael Jackson song.

== Personnel ==
Band

- Bjørn Alexander Brem - vocals
- Eirik "Pezzmaur" Øien - Bass
- Bjørn "Machine" Aadland - guitar
- Glenn Nilsen - guitar
- Levi Gawron - guitar
- Christian Svendsen - drums
- Tom Kalstad - keyboards

Production

- Bjørn Alexander Brem - programming, recording (drums), producer
- Peder Kjellsby - mixing, orchestral arrangements, programming (Additional)
- Rico Darum - producer, recording, programming (Additional)
- Glenn Nilsen - recording (guitar)
- Bjørn Aadland - recording (guitar)
- Ollis - recording (guitar)
- Bengt Brattegaard - recording (drums)
- Christian Svendsen - recording (drums)
- Morten Lund - mastering
- Sebastian Ludvigsen - cover
- Trine + Kim Design Studio - design, layout, cover
