= The Beauty of Gemina =

Swiss electronic/alternative rock band

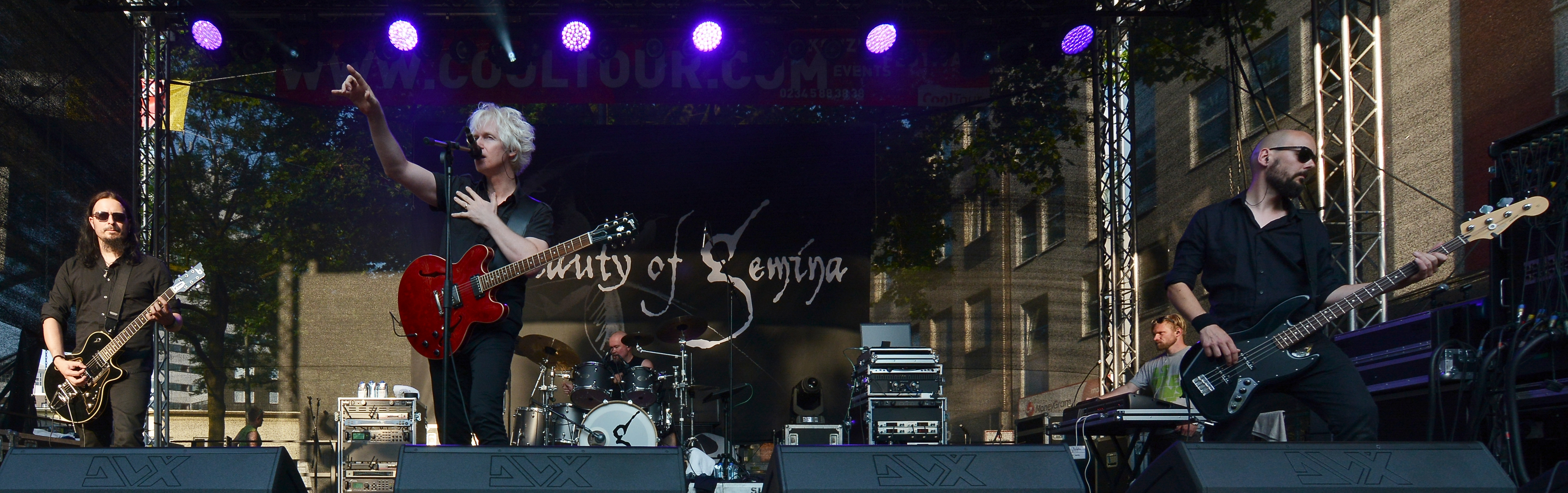
- The Beauty of Gemina at Bochum Total 2015

Background information
- Origin: Zürich, Switzerland
- Genres: Electronic rock, gothic rock, alternative rock, indie rock, dark wave
- Years active: 2006–present
- Labels: Metropolis Records, Danse Macabre Records
- Members: Michael Sele; Mac Vinzens
- Website: http://www.thebeautyofgemina.com

The Beauty of Gemina is a Swiss electronic/alternative rock band founded by Michael Sele in 2006.

== History ==
The Beauty of Gemina was started after the dissolution of Michael Sele's old band, Nuuk. On their debut album, the song "Suicide Landscape" became a number one hit on the World Gothic Charts. For this song, a video was shot at the San Bernardino Pass which was played on VIVA (MTV Europe) and put into rotation on Schweizer Fernsehen.

In the spring of 2008, they were the supporting act for The Smashing Pumpkins in the Zurich Hallenstadion. In May, they played at Wave-Gotik-Treffen in Leipzig. After a tour with the German rock band ASP and some concerts in England, they completed their second album A Stranger to Tears. It was released in Switzerland under their own label tBoG Music, and in Austria and Germany with Danse Macabre Records, the label of Bruno Kramm of Das Ich. The video for the song "This Time" was again aired on VIVA Switzerland and Schweizer Fernsehen. The album hit number three on the Deutsche Alternative Charts. In both 2011 and 2012, they were in Hildesheim to play at the M'era Luna festival.

== Musical style and development ==
The band mixes elements from electronic rock, dark rock, metal and electronic music. Classical elements are integrated into many songs, thus one finds a sample from a Mozart composition in "Victims of Love" from their first album. Influences include techno/trance ("Victims of Love", "Shadow Dancer" and "Galilee Song") and gothic rock/dark wave (guitar on "This Time") that could already be seen in Michael Sele's predecessor band Nuuk.

For their third album At The End Of The Sea, The Beauty of Gemina added more guitars to the foreground, including new wave and post-punk sounds of the 1980s (for example, in "Obscura", "Rumours" and "Narcotica") and alternative rock riffs from the 1990s in such songs as "Black Cat Nights" and "Counting Tears". However, their music still features the fusion of different genres of rock and electronic dance music. For instance, "King's Men Come", "Narcotica" and "La Mer – Rythme Eternel" have breakbeat and trip hop rhythms, while "In Silence" features a typical techno beat from a Roland TR-909 bass drum.

When the band released Iscariot Blues in 2012, the album saw a shift in musical style that would later be developed on subsequent releases. This album saw an increased reliance on acoustic guitar and a sparser, lighter atmosphere. Songs such as "Stairs" and "Badlands" fused elements of folk and blues to their established sound, and Michael Sele's arrangements began to mature. This diverse approach was fully realised on 2016's Minor Sun, which drew on every facet of the band's sound. 2018's Flying With the Owl pushed the band further from its roots into semi-acoustic territory.

The band's next album, Skeleton Dreams, was released on 4 September 2020. The album was met with acclaim, and reintroduced more electric instrumentation largely absent from the previous release. Michael Sele performed a selection of material acoustically for a live-streamed studio session in November 2020. The session was released on vinyl in 2021.

Following delays due to the COVID-19 pandemic, the band embarked on a European tour for Skeleton Dreams in 2022, followed by the XV: 15 Years Anniversary Tour into 2023. The anniversary tour saw the reintroduction of earlier material into their live sets.

In February 2023, the band released the single "When the Night Is Back In Me" - its first new material in over two years, marking the longest gap between recorded works. Another new recording - a reimagining of "One Step to Heaven" from Diary of a Lost - was released in March 2023. The band performed live at the HR Giger Museum in June 2023, as part of the museums 25th anniversary celebrations.

In October, the band announced a new album; Songs of Homecoming. Tour dates were announced for late summer 2024. The first single, "Whispers Of The Seasons", was released in June. Further singles "Veil of Rain", "Symphony of Solitude" and "Countless (There's No Home)" were released in advance of the album. Songs of Homecoming was released on 13 September 2024. The album continued the sound established on Skeleton Dreams, while also reintroducing electronic elements more prominent on earlier releases.

== Lyrics ==
Michael Sele's lyrics deal with issues such as suicide, depression, loneliness and heartache. He has also criticized the Catholic Church, specifically by releasing the songs "Victims of Love" and "Galilee Song" as free downloads during Easter 2009. A significant feature of most songs by The Beauty of Gemina is the amount of repetition in the text. Songs with the traditional style of verse and chorus are rare.

== Discography ==
=== Albums ===
- Diary of a Lost (2006)
- A Stranger to Tears (2008)
- At the End of the Sea (2010)
- Iscariot Blues (2012)
- The Myrrh Sessions (2013)
- Ghost Prayers (2014)
- Minor Sun (2016)
- Flying with the Owl (2018)
- Skeleton Dreams (2020)
- Songs of Homecoming (2024)

=== Live albums ===
- Live at Moods - A Dark Acoustic Night (2015)
- Minor Sun - Live in Zurich (2017)
- Michael Sele - Studio Live Session (2021)

=== DVDs ===
- Pictures of a Lost (2006)
- Live at Moods - A Dark Acoustic Night (2015)
- Minor Sun - Live in Zurich (2017)

Discography taken from The Beauty of Gemina webpage.
