= Pandemonium (Gothminister album) =

Studio album by Gothminister
- Released: 21 October 2022
- Genre: Industrial metal, gothic metal
- Length: 40:23
- Label: AFM Records
- Producer: Bjørn Alexander Brem

Gothminister chronology
The Other Side (2017)	Pandemonium (2022)	Pandemonium II: The Battle of the Underworlds (2024)

Singles from Pandemonium
- 1. "Pandemonium" Released: July 1, 2022; 2. "This is Your Darkness" Released: August 2022; 3. "Demons" Released: September 2022; 4. "Star" Released: September 7, 2022

Pandemonium is the seventh studio album by Norwegian gothic metal band Gothminister, released on 21 October 2022 by the record label AFM Records.

== Track listing ==
All tracks are written by Bjørn Alexander Brem.

No.	Title	Length
1.	"Abgrund (Abyss)"	0:35
2.	"Pandemonium"	5:35
3.	"Demons"	3:36
4.	"Star"	3:37
5.	"Sinister"	3:20
6.	"Kingdoms Rise"	3:42
7.	"Bloodride"	3:49
8.	"Norge"	4:05
9.	"Run Faster"	3:51
10.	"This is Your Darkness"	3:34
11.	"Mastodon"	4:39
