= A.T.Mödell =

Spanish electro-industrial band

- Also known as: Automatische Terroriv Mödell
- Origin: Valencia, Spain
- Genres: Electro-industrial, electronic rock
- Years active: 2009–present
- Labels: Creative Commons, Danse Macabre Records
- Members: Líyak (vocals and programming); Rumi (Keyboards and programming)
- Website: atmodell.com

A.T.Mödell is an electro-industrial Spanish band formed in 2009.

== Discography ==
According to the information available on the official website, the first album of the band, Noise Therapy, was distributed under a Creative Commons license in 2011, and on September 21, 2012 a special, remastered edition of Noise Therapy was released also under a Creative Commons license, labelled Noise Therapy (Special Treatment edition). This album included a bonus CD with remixes done by Julio Nexus (frontman of Interfront/Megabeat) and was named Nexus Therapy. This albums are available as a free download in the official website, among others. These albums were met with average reviews.

On May 24, 2013, their second studio album, Apocalyptophilia, was released through Danse Macabre Records.

On October 1, 2014, their third studio album, Wired for evil, was released through online services such as Amazon, Spotify and Google Play. This time the album has been self-produced. After some months it was released as a completely free of charge download at their website. It was met with positive reception.

On 30 October 2015, their fourth studio album, Epic Nightmares, was released directly as a free download at their website.

Their fifth album, Music is for fun, motherfuckers! was released on March 26, 2021 to mixed reviews.

Album	Release date	Format	Distribution
Noise Therapy	November 11, 2011	Studio album	Creative Commons NC-BY-SA
Noise Therapy (Special Treatment edition)	September 21, 2012	Double album	Creative Commons NC-BY-SA
Apocalyptophilia	May 24, 2013	Studio album	Danse Macabre Records
Wired for evil	October 1, 2014	Studio album	Self-produced
Epic Nightmares	October 30, 2015	Studio album	Self-produced
Music is for fun, motherfuckers!	March 26, 2021	Studio album	Self-produced
