= The Wakes =

Folk rock band

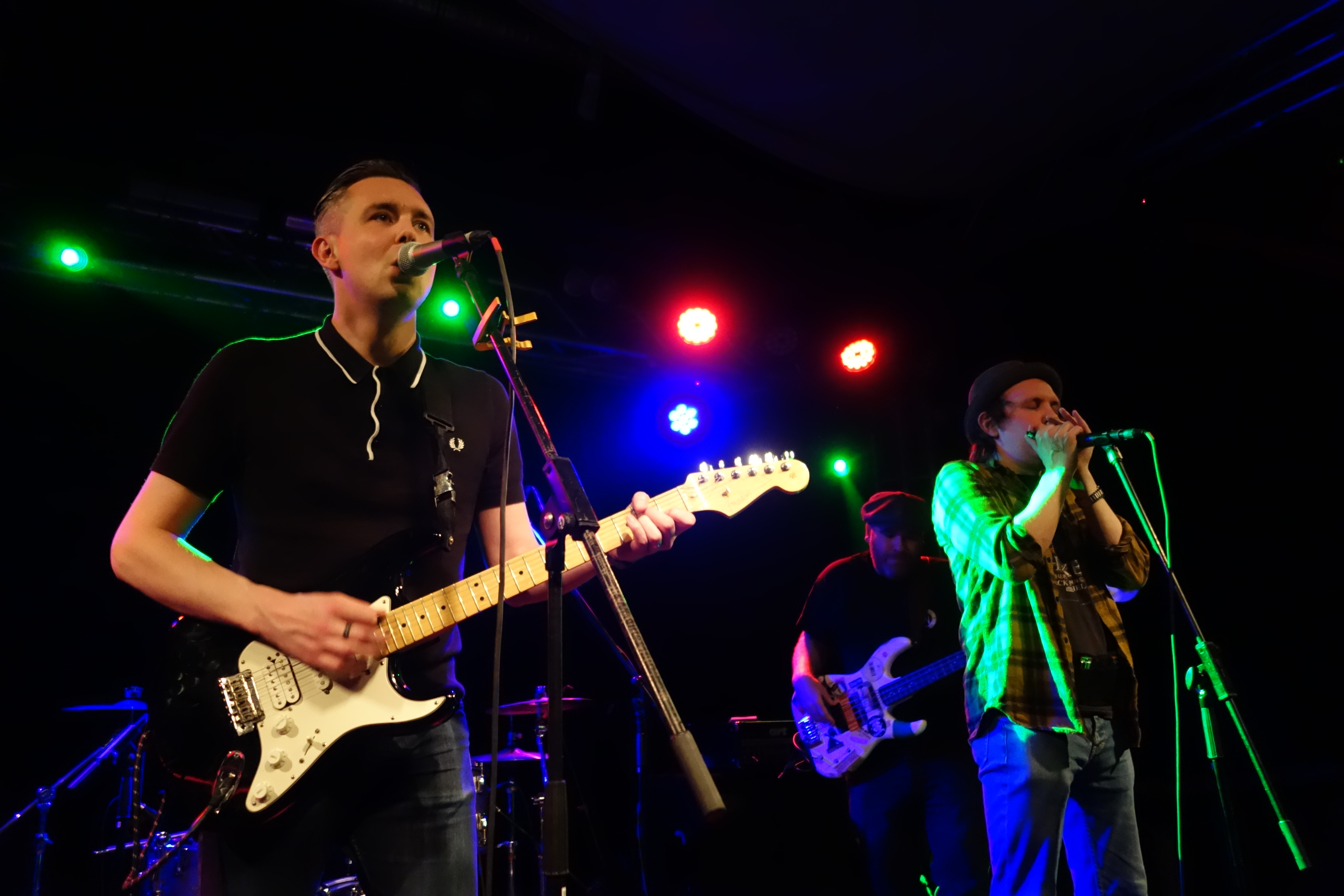
- The Wakes 2017 live in Frankfurt

Background information
- Origin: Glasgow, Scotland
- Genres: Folk rock; folk punk; traditional
- Years active: 2006–present
- Labels: Big Hooley Records; Drakkar Records
- Members: Paul Sheridan (guitar and vocals); Chris Cruickshank(bass guitar); Eamonn Maguire (drums); Christopher James Sheridan (harmonica); Danny McGuinness (whistle); Conor Markey (mandolin and banjo)
- Website: www.thewakes.info

The Wakes are a folk rock band from Glasgow, Scotland. The band's sound is a mixture of Celtic traditional music fused with punk rock and funk. The band's lyrics embrace their culture, heritage and surroundings. They cover all manner of subjects from anti-fascist politics, immigration and unemployment to uprising and rebellion in Scotland, Ireland and beyond. Musical influences include The Pogues, Dick Gaughan, The Clash, Dropkick Murphys and Bob Dylan.

== History ==
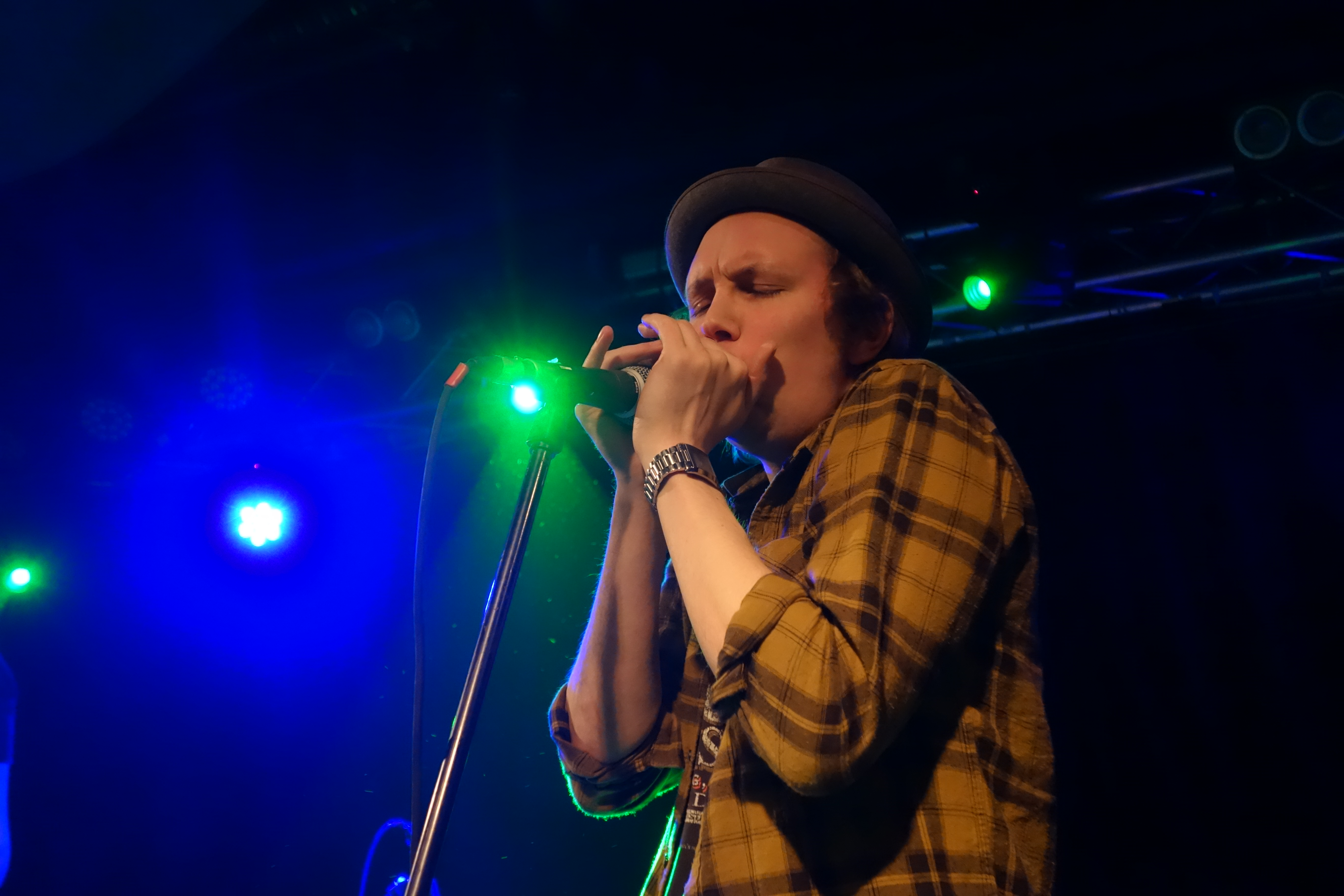
Christopher James Sheridan

Performing as Murphy's Law for most of 2006, The Wakes officially formed in early 2007, releasing their debut album These Hands that summer and pioneering the first of three Glasgow-based Big Hooley concerts in September.

Despite notable personnel changes (which saw Chris Cruickshank swap flute and mandolin duties for the bass guitar and Eamonn Maguire being drafted in on drums) in early February 2008, work began on the next album; released 18 months later as No Irish Need Apply on the band's own Big Hooley label. This album not only produced charity single The Uncrowned King of Football in memory of Glasgow Celtic legend Jimmy Johnstone, but also Pirates of the League, an ode to German football club FC St. Pauli – originally debuted by the band in Hamburg's Knust venue.

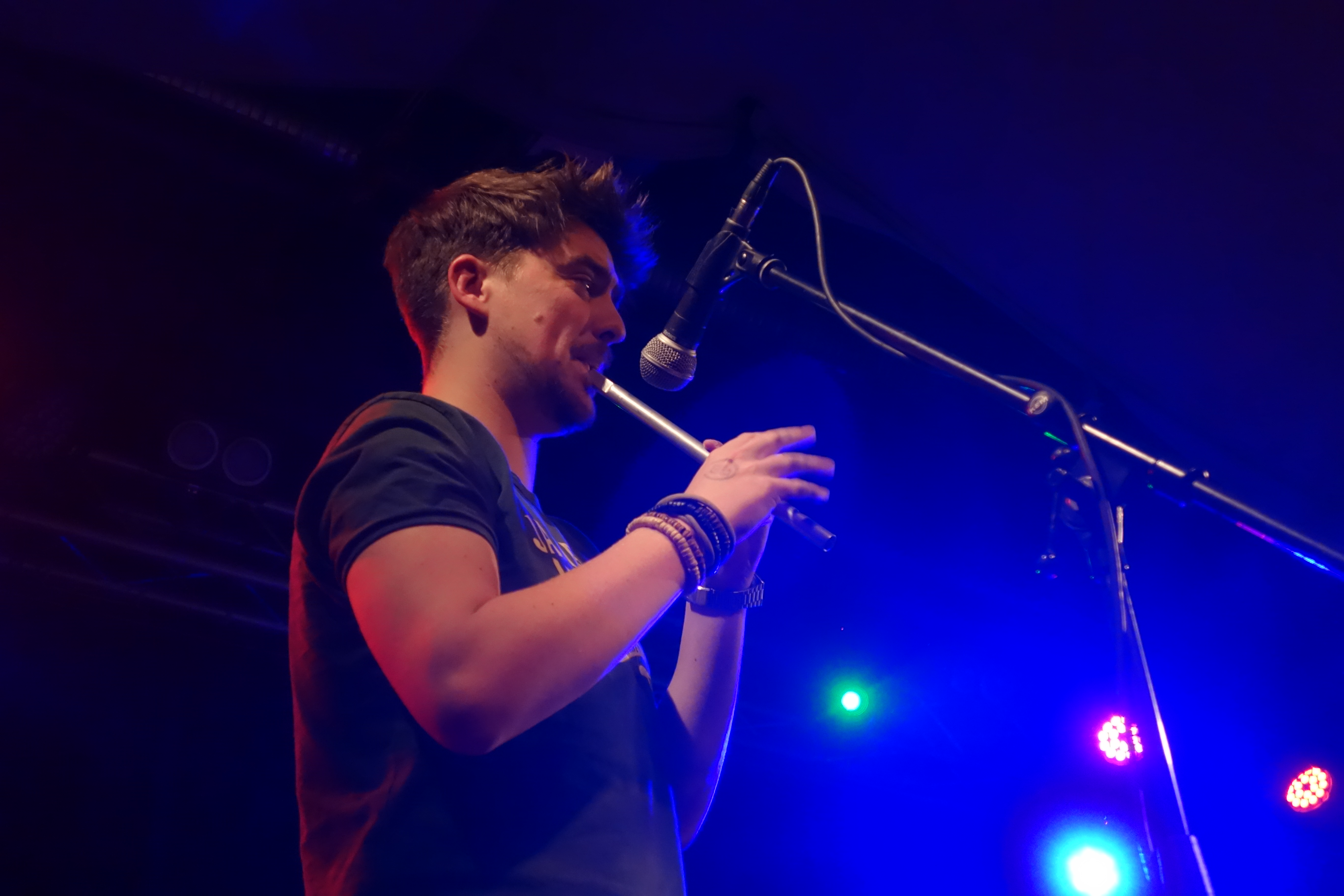
Danny McGuinness

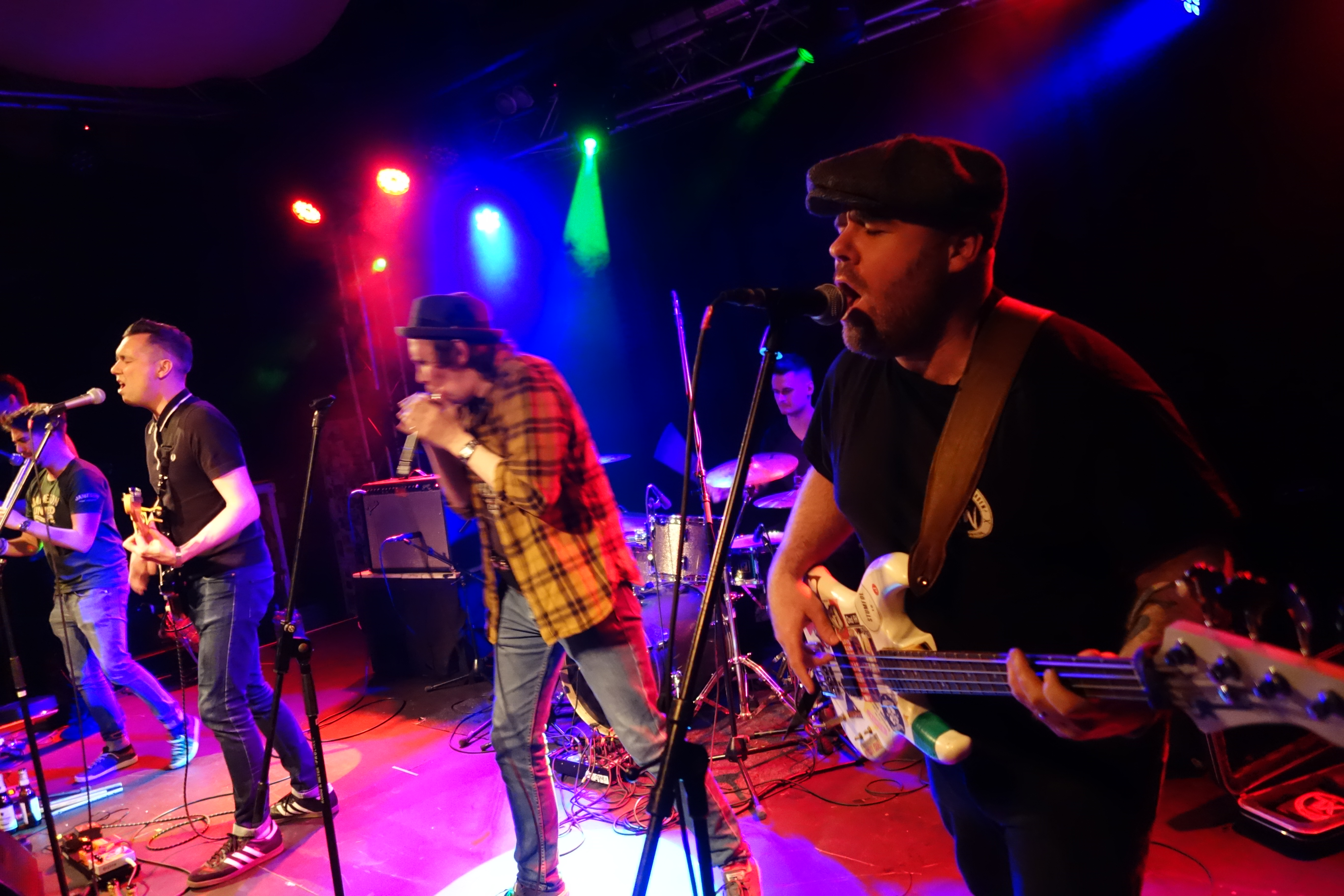
The Wakes 2017 live at "Das Bett" in Frankfurt

European tours continued throughout the coming months, and in May 2010 The Wakes found themselves back in Hamburg once again, this time as part of the centenary celebrations for St Pauli, culminating in a performance at a sold-out, day long music festival in the Millerntor Stadion, sharing the bill with reuniting punk-rock luminaries Slime and indie rockers Thees Uhlmann and Kettcar.

While the continued presence of electric instrumentation in The Wakes' material has provided the necessary edge to the group's rockier "folk 'n' roll" identity, they have long strived to maintain a tangible link to their traditional roots. In December 2011, they issued the entirely acoustic Stripped Back Sessions and in between their amplified sets, they still continue to perform acoustically, with appearances at Glasgow's Americana festival No Mean City (September 2012) and Celtic Connections (January 2013), and performances at Glasgow's Royal Concert Hall (December 2015) and at the city's Old Fruit Market and Oran Mor venues (early 2016).

In August 2013, the group released The Red and the Green, which like its No Irish… predecessor received favourable criticism in various music press, as the folk 'n' roll sound further deepened. This album was re-released in late 2015 when The Wakes signed with Hamburg-based Drakkar Records, with work beginning on Venceremos, the group's fifth LP and their second issued through the Drakkar label. Venceremos was launched in September 2016, becoming the band's most critically acclaimed recording so far.

== Current members ==
- Paul Sheridan: lead vocals and guitar
- Chris Cruickshank: bass, saxophone, flute and vocals
- Eamonn Maguire: drums
- Christopher James Sheridan: harmonica
- Danny McGuinness: whistle
- Conor Markey: banjo, mandolin and electric guitar

== Discography ==
=== Studio albums ===
- These Hands (2007)
- No Irish Need Apply (2009)
- Stripped Back Sessions Vol. 1 (2011)
- The Red and the Green (2013)
- The Red and the Green (2015) (re-release, Drakkar Records)
- Venceremos (2016)

=== Compilations and collaborations ===
- 100 Jahre St. Pauli - Jahr 100 Spiele
- No Pasaran! (They Shall Not Pass), Scots in the Spanish Civil War (2012)
- 10 Jahre Esperanza (2011)
- In Search of a Rose: Reels and Roses Live (2012)
- Don't Be Left Without Us: Morning Star Compilation (2016)

=== Singles/EPs ===
- The Uncrowned King of Football (2008)
- Colours (single) (2012)
- They're Building a Wall (2015)
- No Human is Illegal (2016)
- Paradise to Millerntor (2017)

=== DVDs ===
- 100 Jahre St. Pauli.Das Konzert. Die DVD

=== Videography ===
- Colours (2013)
- Myth of Return - acoustic version (2013)
- 8.30 A.M. Glasgow Cross (2013)
- No Human is Illegal (2016)
