= Aeon Gods =

German metal band

Aeon Gods is a German symphonic power metal band. They have released two albums.

Aeon Gods were formed after Aeternitas went inactive. The band signed with label Scarlet Records.

== Discography ==
- King of Gods (2024)
- Reborn to Light (2026)
