= Grantig =

German metal band

- Origin: Munich, Germany
- Genres: heavy metal, thrash metal
- Years active: 2004–2011
- Labels: Drakkar Entertainment
- Past members: Jonathan Schmid; Alex Negret; Jan Vogelbacher; Jonas Windwehr; Maximilian Zierer; Florian Albrecht; Oliver Diller
- Website: grantig.com

Grantig was a metal band from Munich, Germany. Their music is rooted in thrash metal, but is influenced by southern rock, blues and traditional heavy metal. The word grantig is of south German origin and translates into English as grouchy or angry.

== Biography ==
The band was formed in 2004. The first demo CD was recorded in 2005 without label support. Gigs with bands such as Schweisser followed. The second demo record opened doors for a record deal with German label Drakkar in August 2007. In the following months their full-length debut So muss es sein was written, recorded and released on February 1, 2008. In May 2009 the follow-up Medizin was released and the band opened for Sacred Reich and Suicidal Tendencies on their German tour. A third record was announced but not released. The band split up in May 2011.

== Style ==
The style of Grantig can usually be generalized to thrash metal, although they are influenced heavily by different genres such as hardcore, southern rock, blues and even jazz. The lyrics are written in German.

== Discography ==
- So Muss Es Sein (2008, Drakkar)
- Medizin (2009, Drakkar)
