= Utopia (Gothminister album) =

Studio album by Gothminister
- Released: 17 May 2013
- Genre: Gothic metal, industrial metal
- Length: 43:05
- Language: English
- Label: AFM Records
- Producer: Bjørn Alexander Brem

Gothminister chronology
Anima Inferna (2011)	Utopia (2013)	The Other Side (2017)

Utopia is the fifth studio album by Norwegian gothic metal band Gothminister, released on 17 May 2013 by the record label AFM Records. It is their first concept album to be released, following the signing with AFM in December 2012.

== Track listing ==
All tracks are written by Bjørn Alexander Brem

No.	Title	Length
1.	"The New Beginning" (instrumental)	0:47
2.	"Someone Is After Me"	3:50
3.	"Utopia"	3:43
4.	"March" (instrumental)	0:57
5.	"Horrorshow"	3:05
6.	"Nightmare"	5:53
7.	"Afterlife"	3:43
8.	"Helldemon" (instrumental)	1:42
9.	"All Alone"	4:10
10.	"Purgatory" (instrumental)	0:49
11.	"Eternal"	4:00
12.	"Raise the Dead"	4:33
13.	"Boogeyman"	6:08

== Reception ==
The album got a mixed review by Ulf Kubanke for the website laut.de while Eric May of the New Noise Magazine gave it a rather positive review.
