= The Other Side (Gothminister album) =

Studio album by Gothminister
- Released: 13 October 2017
- Genre: Gothic metal, industrial metal
- Length: 35:30
- Language: English, German
- Label: AFM Records
- Producer: Bjørn Alexander Brem

Gothminister chronology
Utopia (2013)	The Other Side (2017)	Pandemonium (2022)

The Other Side is the sixth studio album by Norwegian gothic metal band Gothminister, released on 13 October 2017 through the record label AFM Records. The album was produced by Henning Verlage, keyboard player of the band Unheilig.

== Track listing ==
All tracks are written by Bjørn Alexander Brem.

No.	Title	Length
1.	"Ich will alles"	3:50
2.	"The Sun"	3:05
3.	"Der fliegende Mann"	3:37
4.	"Aegir"	3:32
5.	"Red Christ"	4:42
6.	"We Are the Ones Who Rule the World"	2:49
7.	"All This Time"	3:19
8.	"Day of Reckoning"	4:10
9.	"Taking Over"	3:00
10.	"Somewhere in Time"	3:26

== Reception ==
Professional ratings
Review scores
Source	Rating
New Noise Magazine	4/5 stars
Reflections of Darkness	9/10

The album has received positive reviews from critics.
