= Pandemonium II: The Battle of the Underworlds =

Studio album by Gothminister
- Released: 3 May 2024
- Genres: Industrial metal; gothic metal
- Length: 39:02
- Label: AFM
- Producer: Bjørn Alexander Brem

Gothminister chronology
Pandemonium (2022)	Pandemonium II: The Battle of the Underworlds (2024)	We Are All Demons (2026)

Singles from Pandemonium II: The Battle of the Underworlds
- 1. "I Am the Devil" Released: 4 August 2023; 2. "Battle of the Underworlds" Released: 27 October 2023; 3. "We Come Alive" Released: 5 January 2024; 4. "One Dark Happy Nation" Released: 15 March 2024

Pandemonium II: The Battle of the Underworlds is the eighth studio album by Norwegian gothic metal band Gothminister. It was released on 3 May 2024 through AFM Records and was produced by Bjørn Alexander Brem, the band's lead vocalist.

== Track listing ==
Pandemonium II: The Battle of the Underworlds track listing
No.	Title	Length
1.	"Battle of the Underworlds"	5:22
2.	"We Live Another Day"	3:45
3.	"Creepy Shadows"	3:30
4.	"One Dark Happy Nation"	3:36
5.	"I Am the Devil"	4:13
6.	"The Procession"	0:52
7.	"I Will Drink Your Blood"	3:21
8.	"Aftermath"	1:10
9.	"Tonight"	3:04
10.	"We Are the Heroes"	3:05
11.	"Monostereo Creature"	3:59
12.	"We Come Alive"	3:01
Total length:		39:02

== Personnel ==
Gothminister

- Bjørn Alexander Brem – lead vocals, programming, production, drums, guitars, bass guitars
- Glenn Nilsen – guitars
- Ketil Eggum – guitars
