= We Are All Demons (album) =

Studio album by Gothminister
- Released: 16 October 2026
- Genres: Gothic metal; industrial metal
- Length: 36:14
- Label: Elevator
- Producer: Bjørn Alexander Brem

Gothminister chronology
Pandemonium II: The Battle of the Underworlds (2024)	We Are All Demons (2026)

Singles from We Are All Demons
- 1. "The Dark" Released: 29 May 2026; 2. "My Revenge" Released: 29 July 2026

Professional ratings
Review scores
Source	Rating
Earshot.at	8/10
Eternal Terror	4.5/6
Metal.de	6/10
Powermetal.de	6.5/10

We All Are Demons is the ninth studio album by Norwegian gothic metal band Gothminister. It was released on 16 October 2026 through Elevator Records and was recorded, produced, mixed, and mastered entirely by Bjørn Alexander Brem, the band's lead vocalist.

== Track listing ==
We Are All Demons track listing
No.	Title	Length
1.	"Darkest Side of Earth"	3:29
2.	"We Are All Demons"	2:21
3.	"Nightmare King"	3:05
4.	"The Dark"	3:46
5.	"The Spell"	2:52
6.	"Welcome to Hell"	3:29
7.	"Salsa"	3:01
8.	"My Revenge"	3:34
9.	"Darkness Is My Throne"	3:30
10.	"Fearless"	3:38
11.	"There's a Crown for All"	3:29
Total length:		36:14

== Personnel ==
- Bjørn Alexander Brem – lead vocals, programming, production, drums, guitars, bass
- Glenn Nilsen – guitars
- Ketil Eggum – guitars
