= Dezperadoz =

German heavy metal band

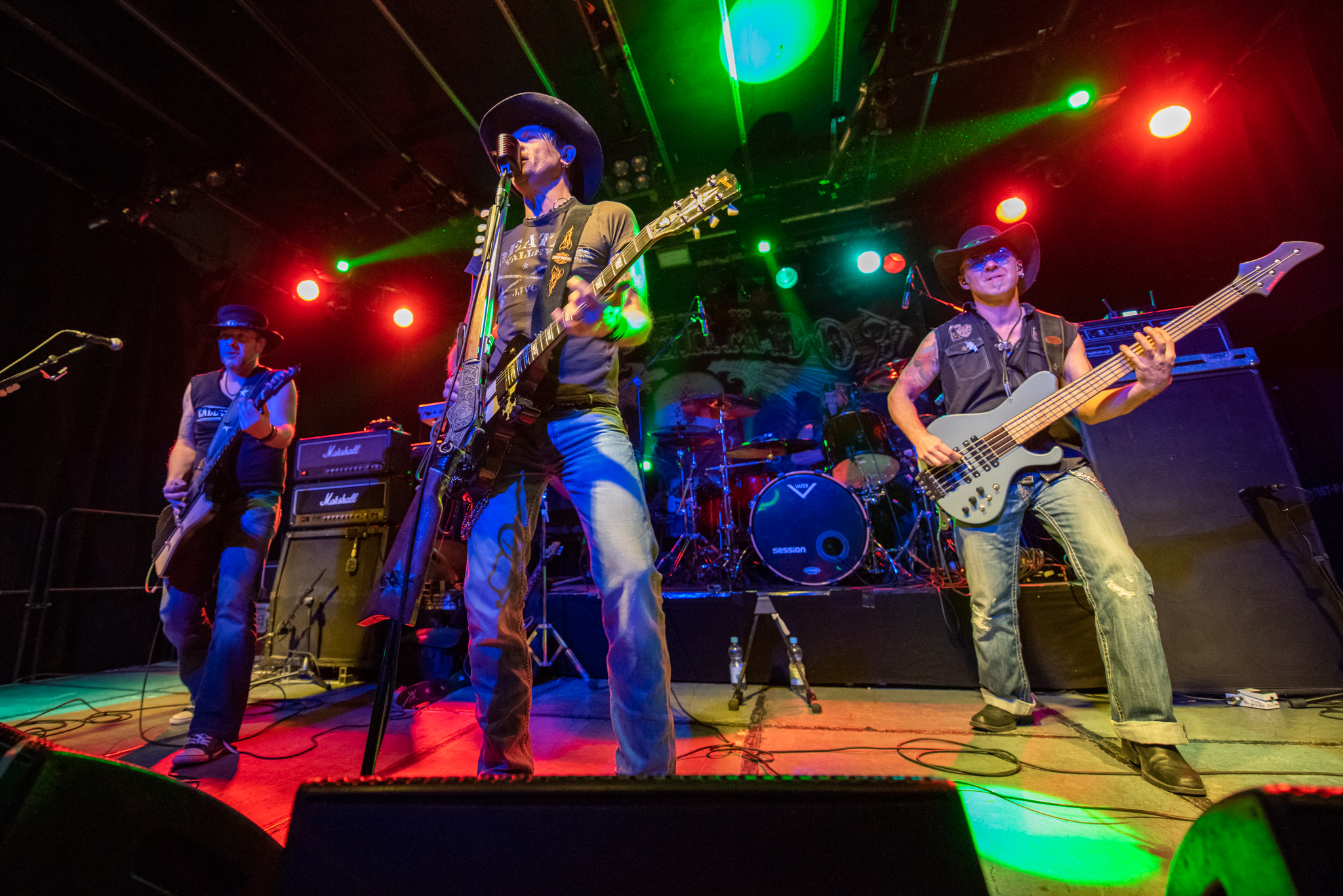
- Dezperadoz performing in 2017

Background information
- Also known as: Desperados
- Origin: Heidelberg, Baden-Württemberg, Germany
- Genres: Heavy metal; Southern rock
- Years active: 2000–present
- Labels: Drakkar, AFM
- Members: Alex Kraft; Lars Nippa; Manuel Mandrysch; Andi Kiesel
- Past members: Tom Angelripper; Dennis Ward; Volker Liebig; Ferdy Doernberg; Olli Lampertsdörfer; Sascha Tilger; Nils Stuerzer; Jochen J.R. Rautenstrauch; Wolfgang M. Sing
- Website: dezperadoz.net

Dezperadoz (formerly Desperados) is a German "Western metal" band and is the side project of Onkel Tom guitarist Alex Kraft. Formed in 2000, the band plays heavy metal music that is heavily influenced by the soundtracks of the 1960s and 1970s Spaghetti Western movies. Dezperadoz has released four albums, two on the German heavy metal label AFM. They have also had guest appearances by many notable heavy metal musicians including Michael Weikath, Tobias Sammet, Joacim Cans, and Doro Pesch.

== History ==
Alex Kraft (Onkel Tom, Sodom) started Dezperadoz originally as a project under the name "Desperados" with Tom Angelripper (Onkel Tom, Sodom) on vocals. The intention was to transfer the rough atmosphere of old Italo-Western movies into today's world of rock and metal.

After the release of Dawn of Dying (2000, Drakkar Records), Dezperadoz saw a longer work break and some lineup changes. Alex Kraft decided to take over the lead vocal part. In 2006, Dezperadoz release the second record, The Legend and the Truth, produced by Dennis Ward (Pink Cream 69) and published by AFM Records. The record turns out to be a concept album which brings to life the Western legend Wyatt Earp, musically. As special guests, Tobias Sammet, Michael Weikath, Doro and others are featured for some speaking parts. Support tours and festival shows followed.

In 2008, the third album, An Eye for an Eye, another concept album, was released. Traveling back in time to 1898, it tells the story of a man of belief and honor. Seeking bloody revenge, he kills his best friend and is ultimately sentenced to death. Through his eyes, we witness the last minutes of his life. Once more, the album was produced by Dennis Ward and published by AFM Records.

Throughout their career, Dezperados has supported artists such as Krokus, Gotthard, Thin Lizzy, Rage, Sodom, Doro, Volbeat, U.D.O., Tesla, and many others on stage. They have also performed at festival shows like Wacken Open Air, With Full Force, Earthshaker, Summerbreeze, and others gigs and tours through Europe and Russia.

In 2012, with a new record contract signed by their old companions, Drakkar Records, the fourth album, Dead Man's Hand, was released, as well as a new edition of the first record Dawn of Dying, which includes a bonus track.

In May 2017, after a few lineup changes, the band released the new album Call of the Wild, a concept album about Billy the Kid, who was known as an American gunfighter of the wild west.

== Members ==
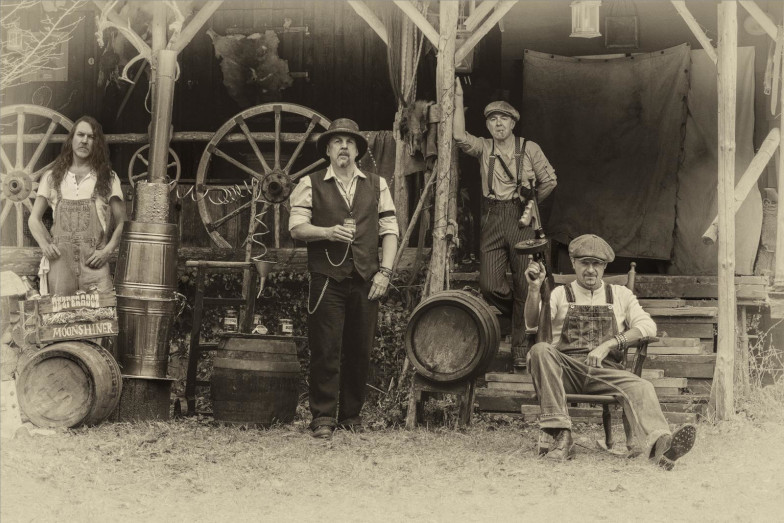
2024 promotional photo

Current

- Manuel Mandrysch – bass, backing vocals
- Lars Nippa – drums, backing vocals
- Andi Kiesel – guitars, backing vocals
- Alex Kraft – vocals, guitars (2000–present)

Former

- Volker Liebig – bass
- Olli Lampertsdörfer – drums
- Sascha Tilger – drums
- Dennis Ward – guitars
- Nils Stürzer – guitars, backing vocals
- Wolfgang Sing – guitars, backing vocals
- Ferdy Doernberg – piano
- Tom Angelripper – vocals
- Alex Weigand – bass
- Markus Kullmann – drums
- Jochen Rautenstrauch – drums

== Discography ==
Studio albums

- 2000: The Dawn of Dying
- 2006: The Legend and the Truth
- 2008: An Eye for an Eye
- 2012: Dead Man's Hand
- 2017: Call of the Wild
- 2024: Moonshiner
