= Aeternitas (band) =

German metal band

Aeternitas was a German symphonic metal band. They released six albums, among others two on Massacre Records.

In the 2020s, the band signed with label WormHoleDeath and changed singer to Miss ScarRed before eventually disbanding. In its wake, a new band Aeon Gods was formed.

== Discography ==
- Requiem (2000)
- La danse macabre (2004)
- Rappacinis Tochter (2009, Danse Macabre)
- House of Usher (2016, Massacre Records)
- Tales of the Grotesque (2018, Massacre Records)
- Haunted Minds (2020, WormHoleDeath)
