= Karelia (band) =

French heavy metal band

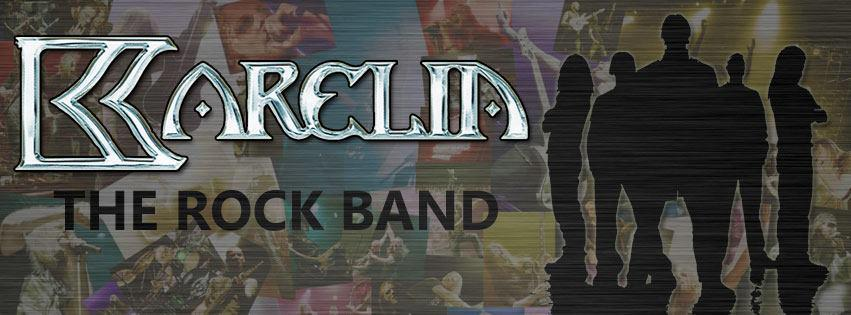

Background information
- Origin: Guebwiller, France
- Genres: Symphonic power metal
- Years active: 2000 - 2013
- Labels: Drakkar Productions, Season of Mist
- Members: Matthieu Kleiber; Erwan Morice; Gilles Thiebaut; Loïc Jenn; Jack Ruesch
- Past members: Chris Savourey; Claude Gasparini; Lionel Vest; Bertrand Maillot; Sébastien Fellmann
- Website: www.karelia.fr

Karelia were a French heavy metal band created in 2000 by Lionel Vest and Matthieu Kleiber.

== Biography ==
Karelia first released a self-titled demo in 2000.

Their first full-length album Usual Tragedy was released in 2004 on the German label Drakkar Records. The orchestral arrangements give it its symphonic heavy metal (or simply symphonic metal) tag. Lyricwise, Usual Tragedy is a concept album about a man who crossed both World Wars, lost his father during the first one, lost his beloved one during the second one, witnessed the violence and the madness of men, eventually lost his own sanity and died alone and anonymous in an hospital.

Their second studio album, Raise, released in 2005 on Drakkar Records as well, is not as orchestral as Usual Tragedy but has dark, melancholic atmospheres that could already be heard on the first album as well and that seem to be the band's trademark; that's why Karelia's music is also sometimes called gothic metal. The lyrics deal with various themes such as blinding and misleading of people by a charismatic leader ("Raise"), religion wars ("Cross and Crescent"), childhood ("Child Has Gone", "Unbreakable Cordon"), depression ("Breakdown").

In January 2007 keyboardist Bertrand Maillot left the band, and Jack Ruesch joined the band as second guitarist.

In June 2007 the band finished the recording of its third album Restless. It was first expected to be released in September/October 2007 (as stated in January 2007 on their still-working then website), but Karelia later announced on its MySpace that it would be released through the French label Season Of Mist; the label's website displays 21 April 2008 as the release date. The cover artwork hasn't been revealed yet. Restless will show new musical orientations, featuring industrial elements.

In autumn November 2007 Karelia opened for the well-known German hard rock band Scorpions for three of their shows in France.

Finally, on 26 August 2011, the album Golden Decadence was released, with the guest Rudolf Schenker of Scorpions playing guitar on two songs and Keep Watching Me The Way Across The Hills and 3 bonus tracks, including the resumption of Queen The Show Must Go On.

On 2 June 2012 the group were back on the stage with Scorpions for their last day in France at the outdoor amphitheater at the Zenith of Nancy Nancy Festival On The Rocks. In this concert, Lex, singer and leader of Koritni came to sing with the band the title of Misfits Attitude.

In May 2013, the band finally decided to break up.

== Influences ==
According to Karelia's frontman Matthieu Kleiber, the band members had various influences, citing, among others, classical music as well as hard rock bands like Guns N' Roses and Aerosmith for himself and ex-keyboardist Bertrand Maillot, hard rock such as Whitesnake for bassist Gilles Thiebaut, symphonic heavy metal bands for guitarist Erwan Morice and drummer Loïc Jenn.

== Members ==
=== Final lineup ===
- Matthieu Kleiber – backing vocals, vocals
- Erwan Morice – guitar
- Jack Ruesch – guitar
- Gilles Thiebaut – bass
- Loïc Jenn – drums
- Bobby Gu - record producer

=== Former members ===
- Bertrand Maillot – keyboard
- Chris Savourey – guitar
- Claude Gasparini – bass
- Lionel Vest – guitar, keyboard
- Sébastien Fellmann – guitar

== Discography ==
=== Studio albums ===
- Usual Tragedy (2004)
- Raise (2005)
- Restless (2008)
- Golden Decadence (2011)

=== Demo albums ===
- Karelia (2000)
