= Eisenfunk =

German band

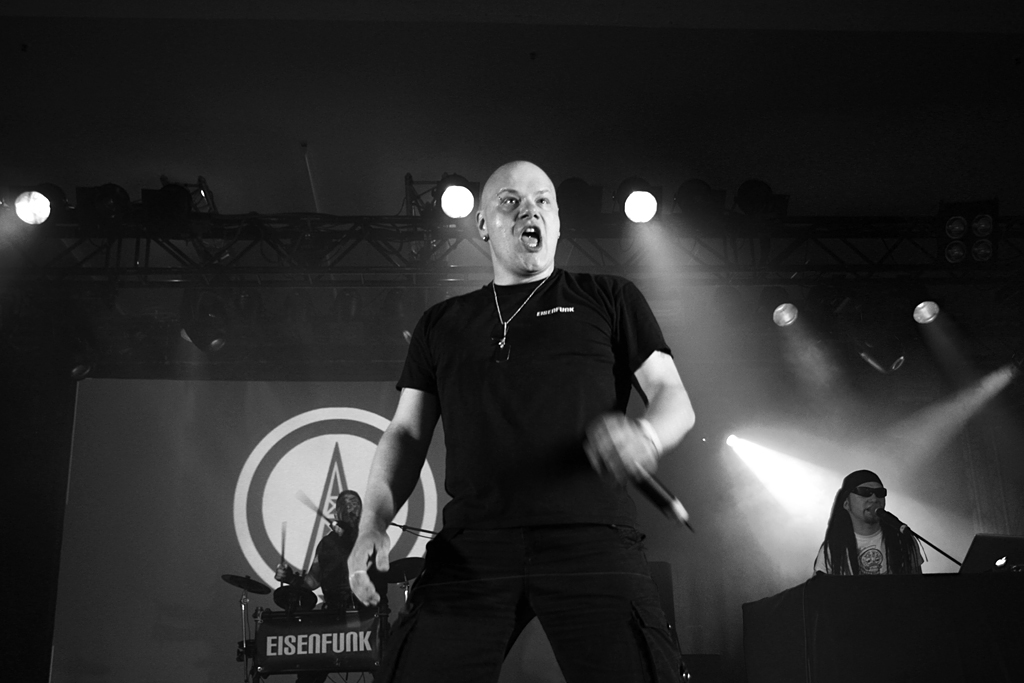
- Eisenfunk at the 2012 Amphi Festival

Background information
- Origin: Germany
- Genres: EBM, Industrial
- Years active: 2006–2014; 2024–present
- Labels: Biohazzard Records
- Members: Michael Mayer; Arthur Stauder; Toni Schulz
- Website: eisenfunk.de

Eisenfunk are a German electronic body music (EBM) band.

== History ==
The band was founded by Michael Mayer in early 2006. They published its first EP, Funkferngesteuert later that year. In 2007, Arthur Stauder and Toni Schulz joined the group. That same year the band released their first CD, the eponymous Eisenfunk, and began playing live shows.

In July 2012, the band played at the Amphi Festival in Cologne, Germany.

In May 2014 the band announced the end of the Eisenfunk project. Eisenfunk's last official concert took place on 17 May 2014, in Ingolstadt, Germany. Despite this, their music was still played online, and still gained popularity amongst new cybergoths.

In July 2024, more than 10 years since they had disbanded, Eisenfunk announced on their YouTube channel that they had reformed and would release an album, which they did later in the year.

== Discography ==
- Funkferngesteuert (EP, 2006)
- Eisenfunk (2007)
- 300 (EP, 2008)
- Schmerzfrequenz (2009)
- 8 Bit (2010)
- Pentafunk (2011)
- Superhelden (2024)
