= Concrete/Rage =

German electro-industrial music project

Concrete/Rage is a German electro-industrial project started by Benjamin Sohns in Kirn in 2005.

== History ==
Concrete/Rage has released two albums with Danse Macabre Records, both of which charted on the DAC. Their debut album (Un)natural reached number 10 while their second album Chaos Nation reached number 3 on the 2009 German Alternative Charts. A publicity campaign for the album Chaos Nation has brought attention from the music magazines Zillo, Sonic Seducer, and Gothic. Concrete/Rage made its stage debut on April 18, 2009 at the Elekktroshokk Festival in Adelsheim.

== Discography ==
- (Un)natural (2008)
- Chaos Nation (2009)
