= Waves under Water =

Swedish darkwave/synthpop band

- Origin: Stockholm, Sweden
- Genres: Darkwave; Synthpop
- Years active: 2007–present
- Labels: Calorique Records; Danse Macabre
- Spinoffs: LinaLaukaR
- Members: Angelica Segerbäck; Johan Svärdshammar Live members: Ursula Ewrelius
- Past members: Rickard Kretschmer
- Website: http://www.myspace.com/wavesunderwater

Waves under Water is a Swedish darkwave/synthpop band formed in October 2007 by the singer Angelica Segerbäck and the composer Johan Svärdshammar. The band has a romantic image which flirts with goth, steampunk and new romantic.

== Biography ==
The band recorded their first two songs "Winter Garden" and "My Cup" in 2007 on the first day, under the temporary name Hopscotch. Soon they changed their name to Waves under Water and in May 2008 they released their first demo titled Winter Garden. Their debut album Serpents and the Tree was released in October 2009 on their own label Calorique Records together with Danse Macabre. The album entered at number 8 in the Deutsche Alternative Charts. The main theme of the album is Norse pagan myths and the drama between winter and summer, and the album title refers to the tree Yggdrasil.

Apart from the founders Angelica Segerbäck and Johan Svärdshammar, there is also one live member, Ursula Ewrelius on synth. On stage, the band uses different kinds of instruments like synths, guitars, cello, glockenspiel and a bass played with a sickle.

Segerbäck and Svärdshammar also have the side project LinaLaukaR.

== Band members ==
- Angelica Segerbäck, (Vocals, Lyrics, Music, Glockenspiel, Cello)
- Johan Svärdshammar, (Music, Lyrics, Backing Vocals, Synth, Bass played with sickle, Guitar)

=== Live Band members ===
- Ursula Ewrelius, (Synth, Bass guitar) Live member from 2009

== Discography ==
=== Albums ===
- Winter Garden – (Demo) 2008
- A Short Presentation of – (Demo) 2009
- Serpents and the Tree – (CD Album) 2009 – Calorique Records, Danse Macabre
- All of Your Light – (CD Album) 2011 – Danse Macabre

=== Singles ===
- Winter Garden – (digital) 2009
- Red Red Star – (digital) 2010
- Tomorrow – (digital) 2011

=== Compilation appearances ===
- Dark Alliance vol. 3 – (CD) 2009, Track No. 1 "Serpents and the Tree" – Danse Macabre
- New Signs & Sounds 11/09 – (CD) 2009, Track No. 2 "Serpents and the Tree" – Zillo
- Sonic Seducer Cold Hands Seduction Vol. 100 (CD) 2009, Track No. 7 "Winter Garden" – Sonic Seducer
- Gothic Lifestyle 3 (CD) Nov 2009, Track No. 13 "Serpents and the Tree" – Gothic Magazine
- EXTREME traumfänger 10 (CD) Dec 2009, Track No. 9 "Nothing More" – UpScene
- Die Zillo-CD 05/2010 (CD) Apr 2010, Track No. 15 "Red Red Star" – Zillo
- Dark Alliance vol. 7 – (CD) 2010, Track No. 8 "Red Red Star" – Danse Macabre
- VA-Zillo New Signs & Sounds 02 – 2011 (CD) Feb 2011, Track No. 5 "Tomorrow" – Zillo
- Gothic Compilation 50 (2CD) Feb 2011, CD2 Track No. 15 – Gothic
