= Stoneman (band) =

Swiss rock band

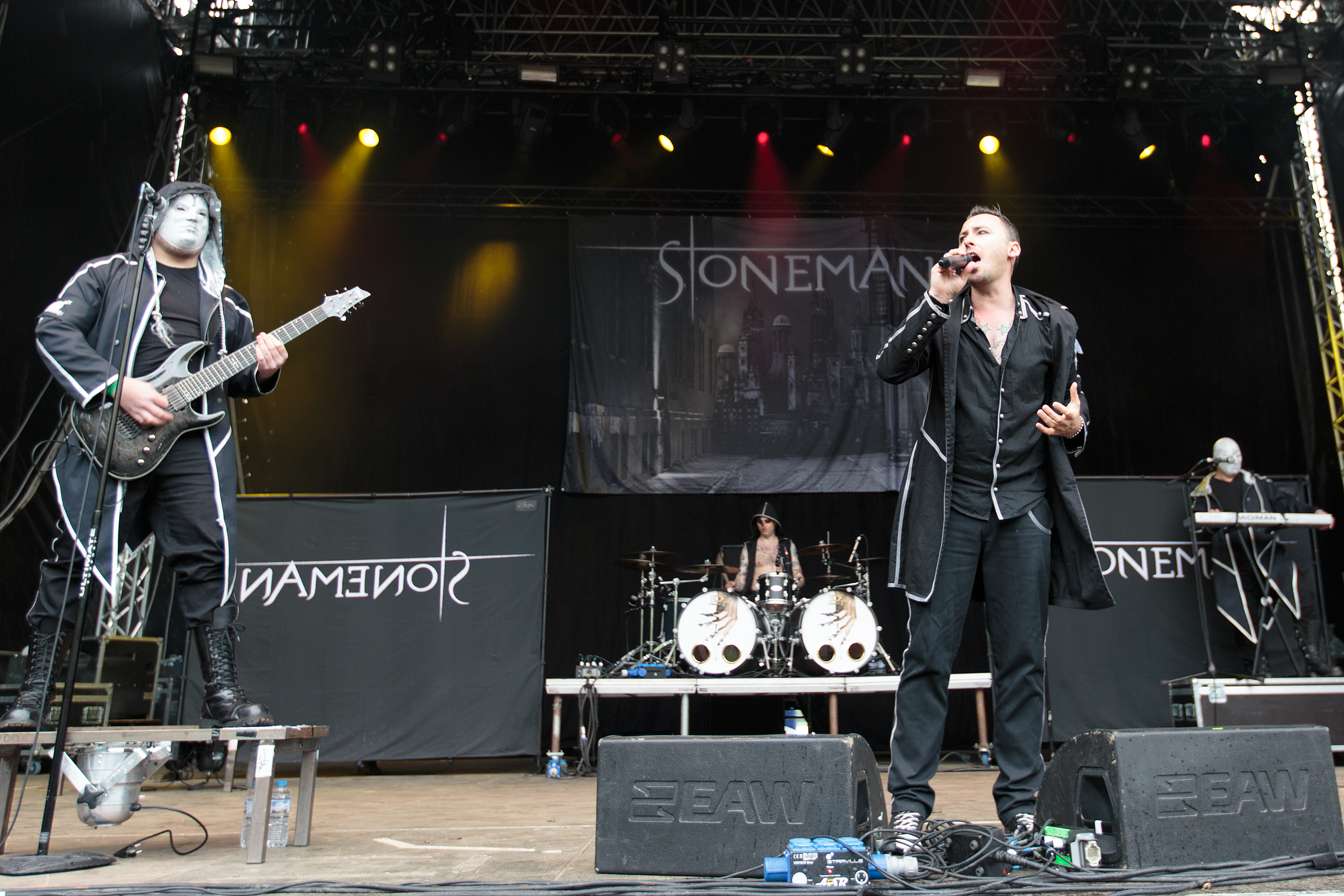
- Stoneman performing in 2015

Background information
- Origin: Switzerland
- Genres: Industrial metal, Neue Deutsche Härte, dark rock
- Years active: 2004–2026
- Label: Massacre Records
- Website: stonemanmusic.ch

Stoneman is a Swiss rock band formed in 2004. With the release of their fourth album in 2014, the band underwent a change in style from English-language gothic rock to Neue Deutsche Härte.

== History ==
After Mikki Chixx and Rico H decided to form a band in spring 2004, they quickly found some like-minded people. Despite several changing bassists, the original formation of the band Stoneman was clear.

On 20 October 2006, the debut album Sex Drugs Murder was released, in which Sabine Dünser contributed the vocals to Devil In A Gucci Dress and Protect Me. The video for Devil in a Gucci Dress was shown on several TV stations like MTV and VIVA. In autumn 2006 Stoneman were on tour with the Deathstars. In early 2007 Dave Snow switched to bass, whereupon the keyboards are played by a sampler. In May 2007 followed another European tour, this time already as headliner.

On 14 September 2007, the second album How to Spell Heroin was released, which was again produced by Dave Snow. It received conflicting reviews. While it was perceived as a clear increase to Sex Drugs Murder, others criticized the songs always built according to the same knitting pattern.

In 2008 they performed at one of the biggest festivals of the alternative scene, the Wave-Gotik-Treffen in Leipzig. Tours with the German rock band Xandria and the glam rocker Wednesday 13 followed, whereby the latter recorded a feature song on the third album Human Hater. In 2011 the band signed a management contract with ICS Festival Service GmbH and the music publisher Enorm Music.

In 2014, Stoneman released their fourth and only full German album Goldmarie, which was published by the leading dark label Danse Macabre and Bruno Kramm. The band made it onto the cover and poster inserts of specific music magazines The band placed fourth on the German Alternative Charts (DAC). In 2015, Stoneman was the opening act on the "Terlingua" tour of Mono Inc. Stoneman also performed on the main stage at the Wacken Open Air, as well as other festival shows.

== Discography ==
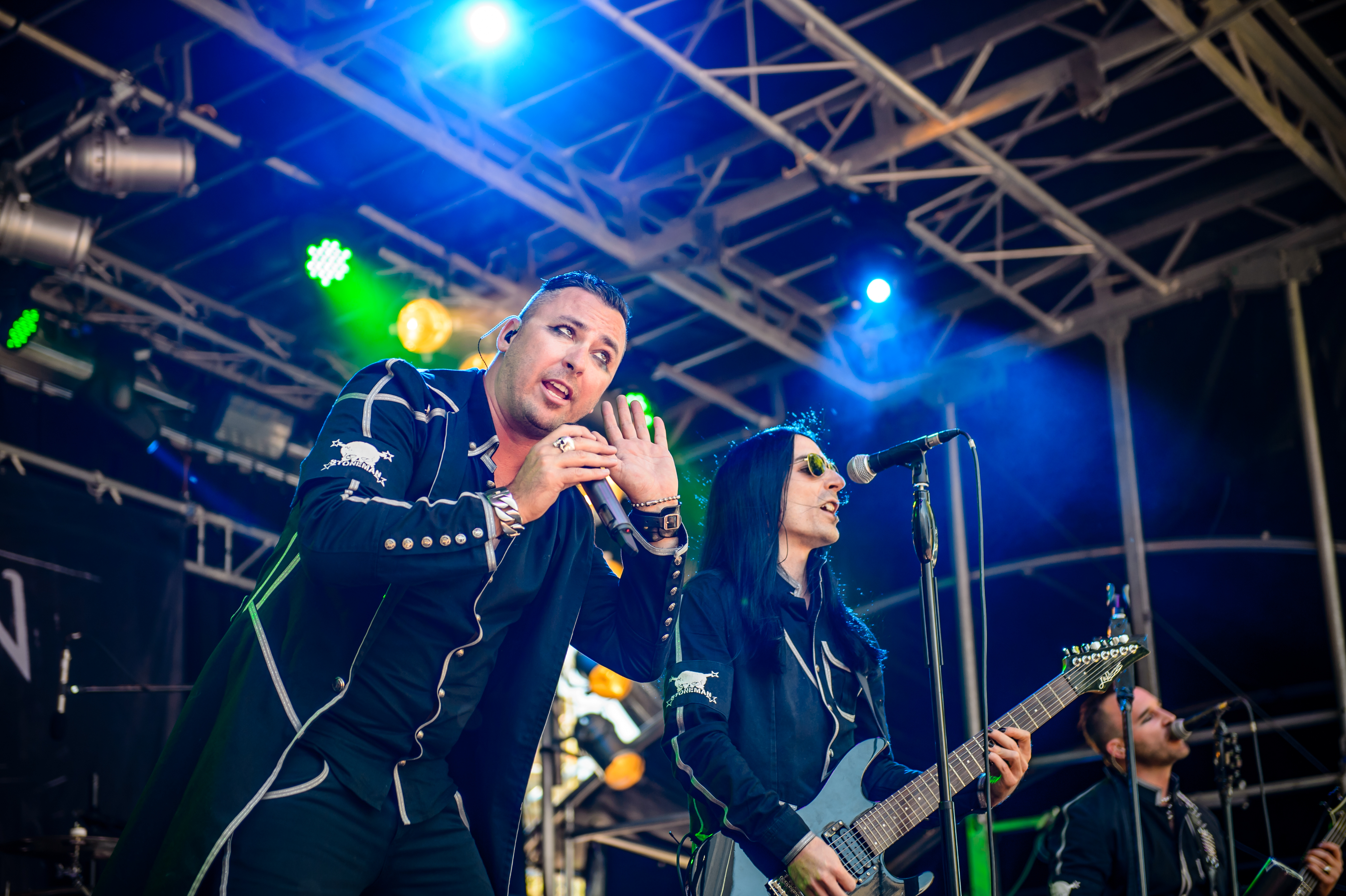
Stoneman at Castle Rock Festival 2016 in Germany

Studio albums

- 2006: Sex. Drugs. Murder. (Twilight)
- 2007: How to Spell Heroin (Twilight)
- 2010: Human Hater (Twilight)
- 2014: Goldmarie (Danse Macabre)
- 2016: Steine (NoCut Entertainment)
- 2018: Geil und elektrisch (Massacre Records)
- 2024: NEU! (Massacre Records)
