= Gothminister =

Norwegian gothic metal band

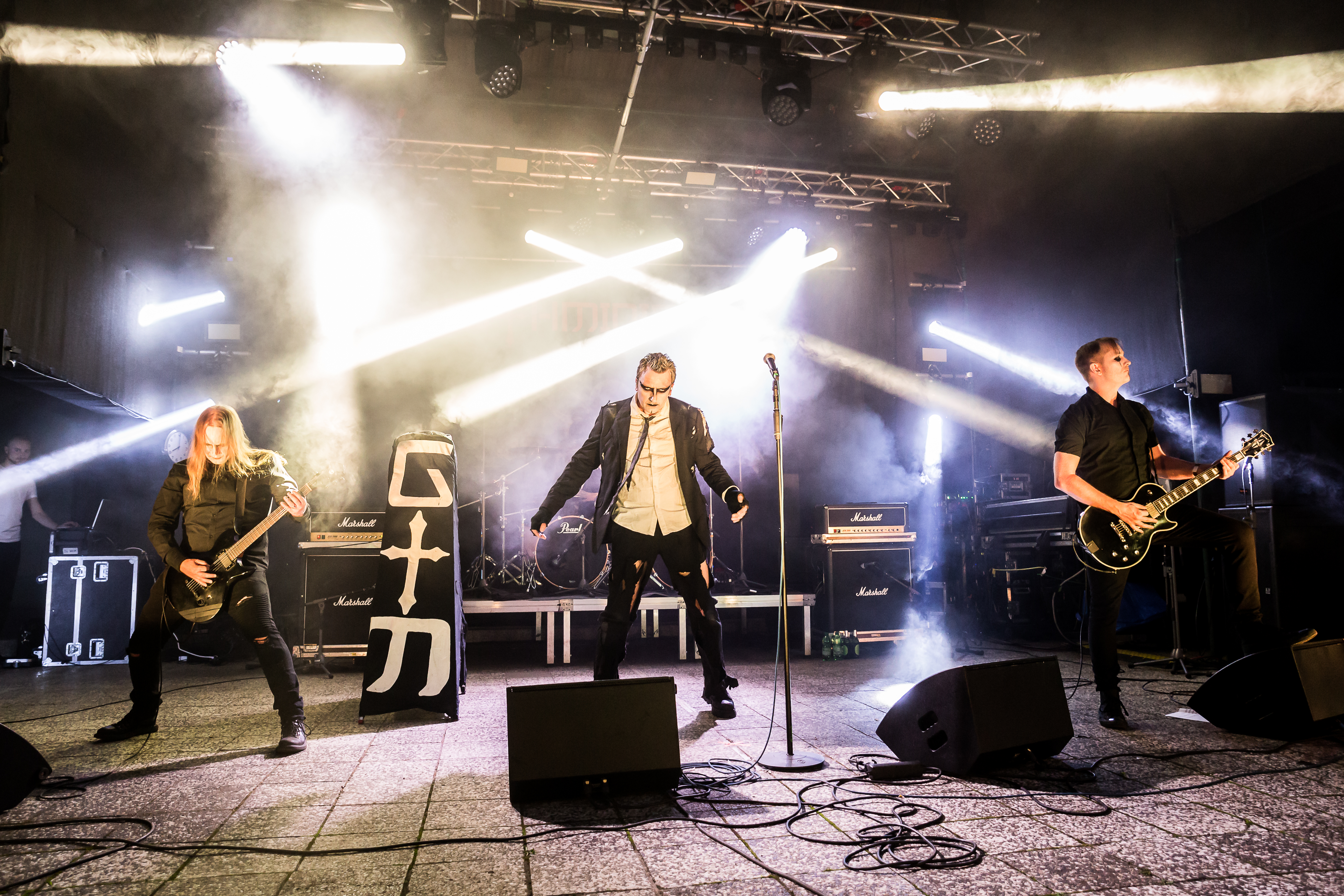
- Gothminister live at Nocturnal Culture Night 2018 in Germany

Background information
- Origin: Oslo, Norway
- Genres: Gothic metal, industrial metal
- Years active: 1999–present
- Labels: Angel, BMG, Drakkar, e-Wave, Soulfood, Tatra, Tuba, AFM
- Members: Bjørn Alexander Brem; Glenn Nilsen
- Website: gothminister.com

Gothminister is a Norwegian gothic metal band. Formed in 1999, they released eight studio albums and gained success in Germany. They played in several German music festivals, including Wave-Gotik-Treffen (WGT), the Dark Storm Festival and the M'era Luna Festival, and performed in front of over 10,000 people at the Schattenreich Festival.

They took part in Melodi Grand Prix 2013 and Melodi Grand Prix 2024, the Norwegian selection for the Eurovision Song Contest 2024, with the song "We Come Alive". They advanced from their semi-final on 13 January 2024, finishing fourth in the final.

== Musical style ==
The band mixes gothic and industrial metal music, ie: programming and electronic music alongside metal guitars and dark lyrical themes. Their songs also regularly use the Drop-D tuning.

== Members ==
Gothminister, band members at Rockharz 2026

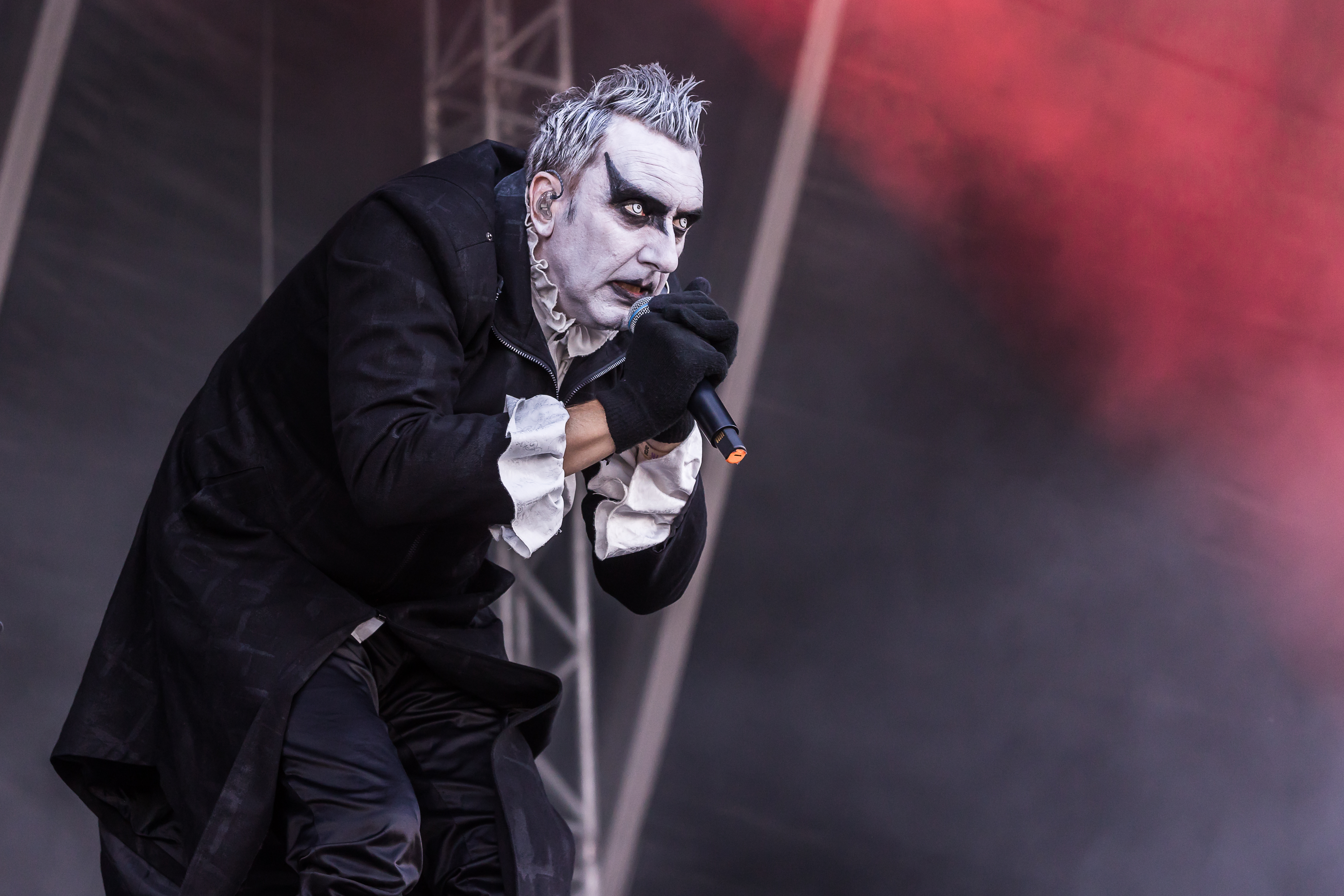
Bjørn Alexander Brem „Gothminister“, vocals

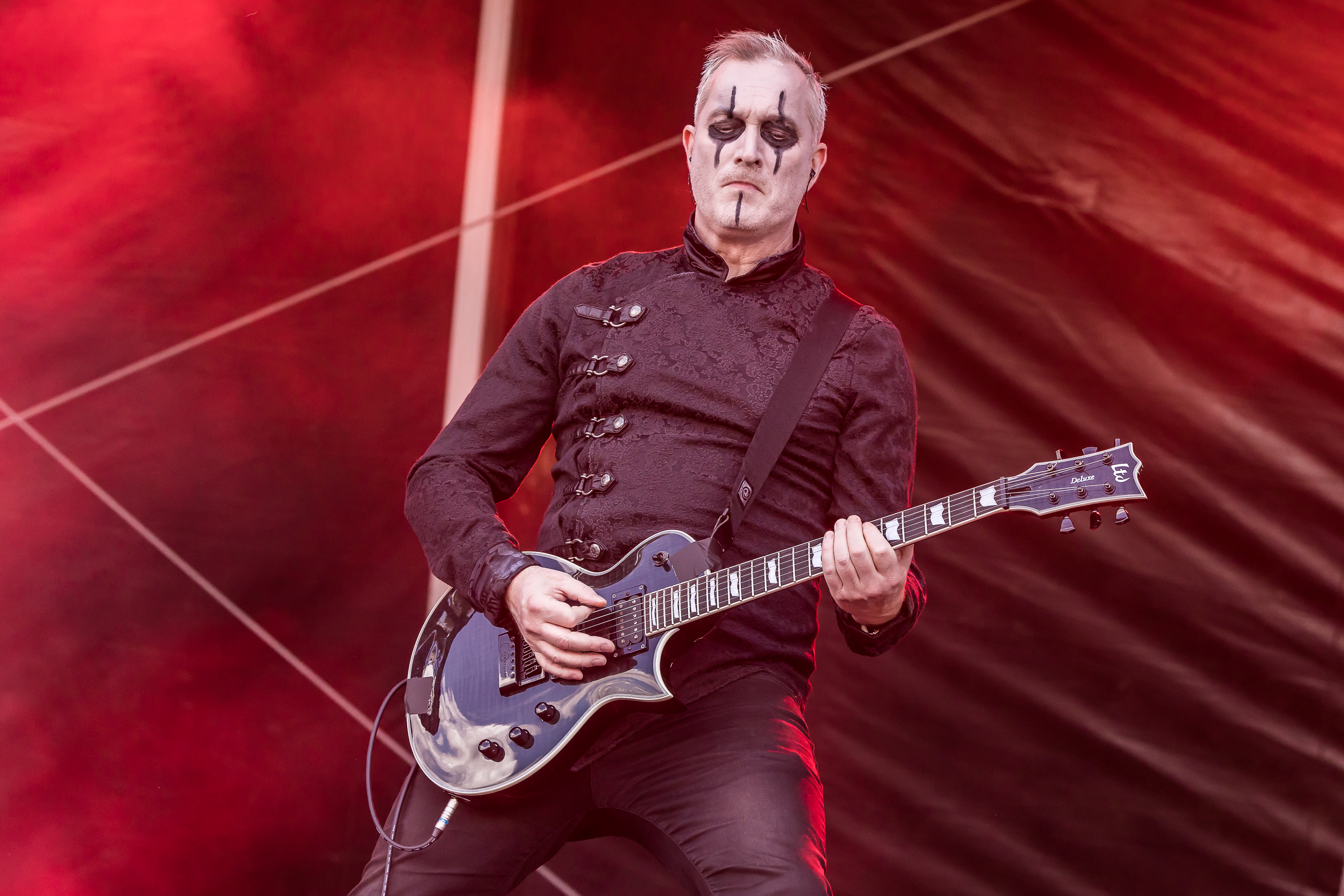
Glenn Nilsen „Icarus“, guitars

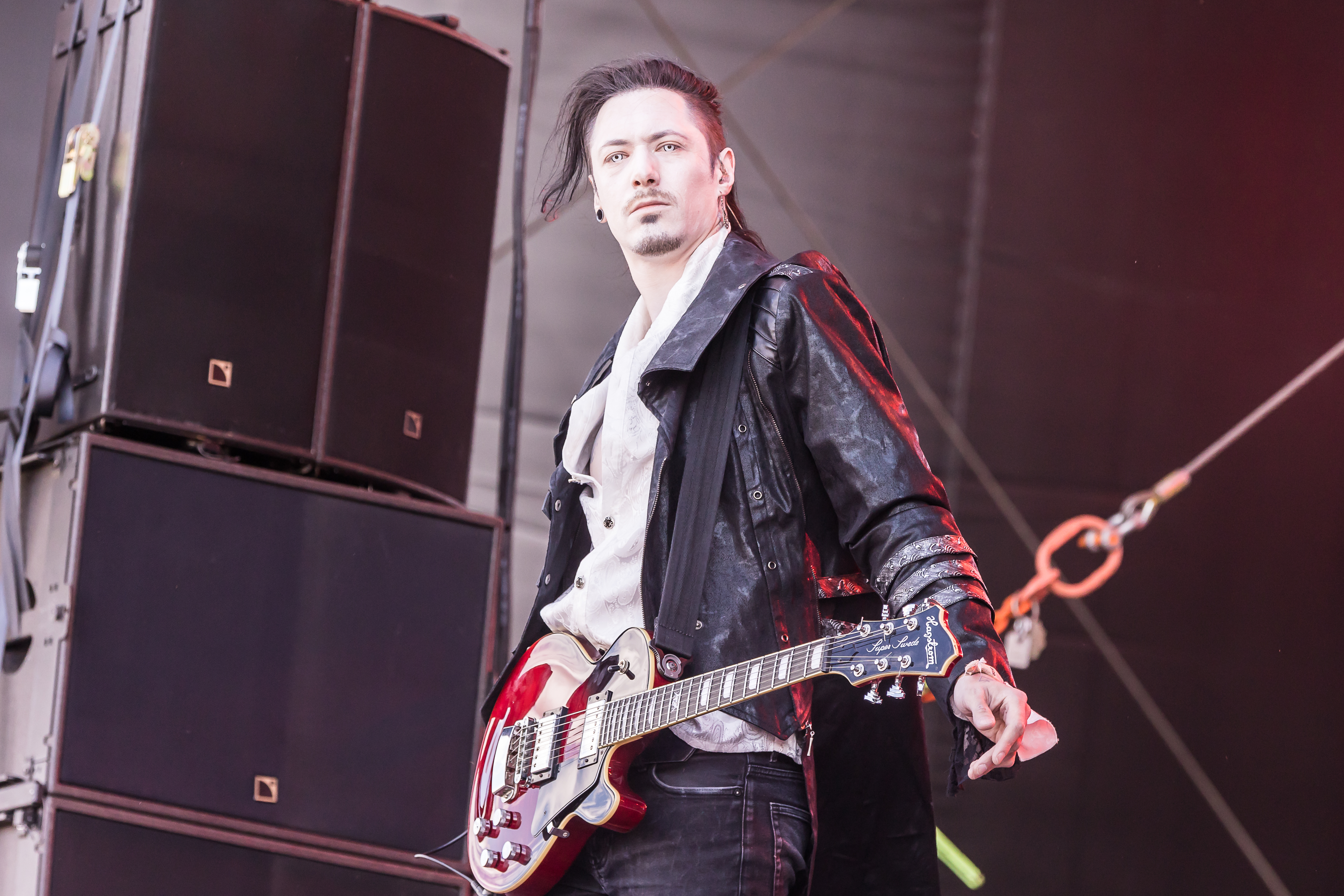
Nikolas Eckstein, Guitars (live musician)

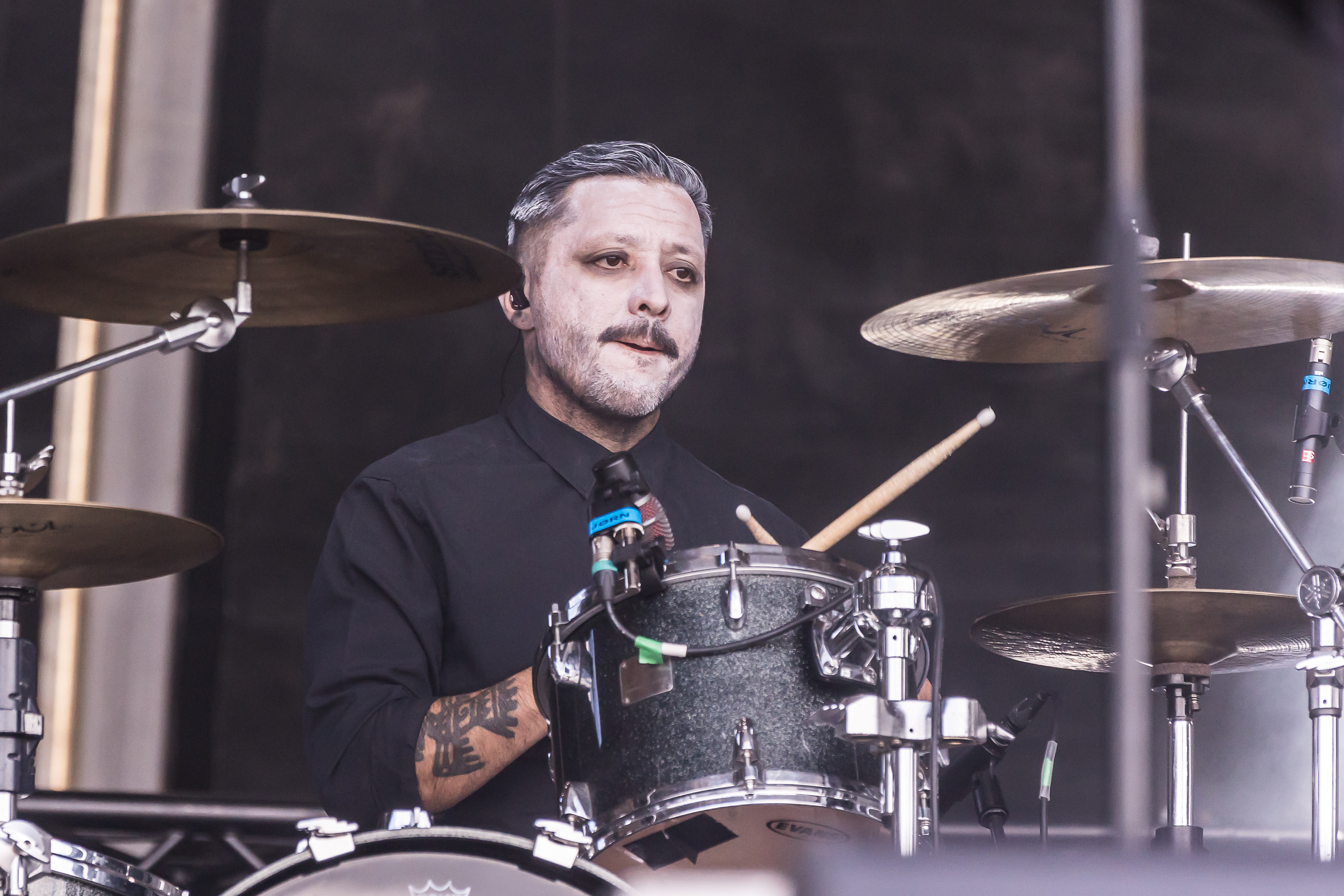
Jonathan Alejandro Perez, drums (live musician)

Current members

- Bjørn Alexander Brem – lead vocals, programming, instruments
- Glenn Nilsen – guitars

Former members

- Bjørn Aadland - guitars
- Tom Kalstad – keyboards
- Sandra Jensen – additional vocals
- Ketil Eggum – guitars
- Andy Moxnes – live keyboards, guitars
- Christian Svendsen – live drums

Guest appearances

- Nell Sigland – vocals on "Wish" (track 10 on Gothic Electronic Anthems), and "Your Saviour", "The Allmighty" and "Emperor" (tracks 3, 6 and 8 respectively on Happiness in Darkness)
- Cecilia Kristensen – the "Girl" in the "Darkside" video

Live guest appearances

- Eric Burton – live vocals for "Hatred" at M'era Luna Festival 2004
- Bruno Kramm – keyboards on Wave-Gotik-Treffen and M'era Luna Festival 2011

== Discography ==
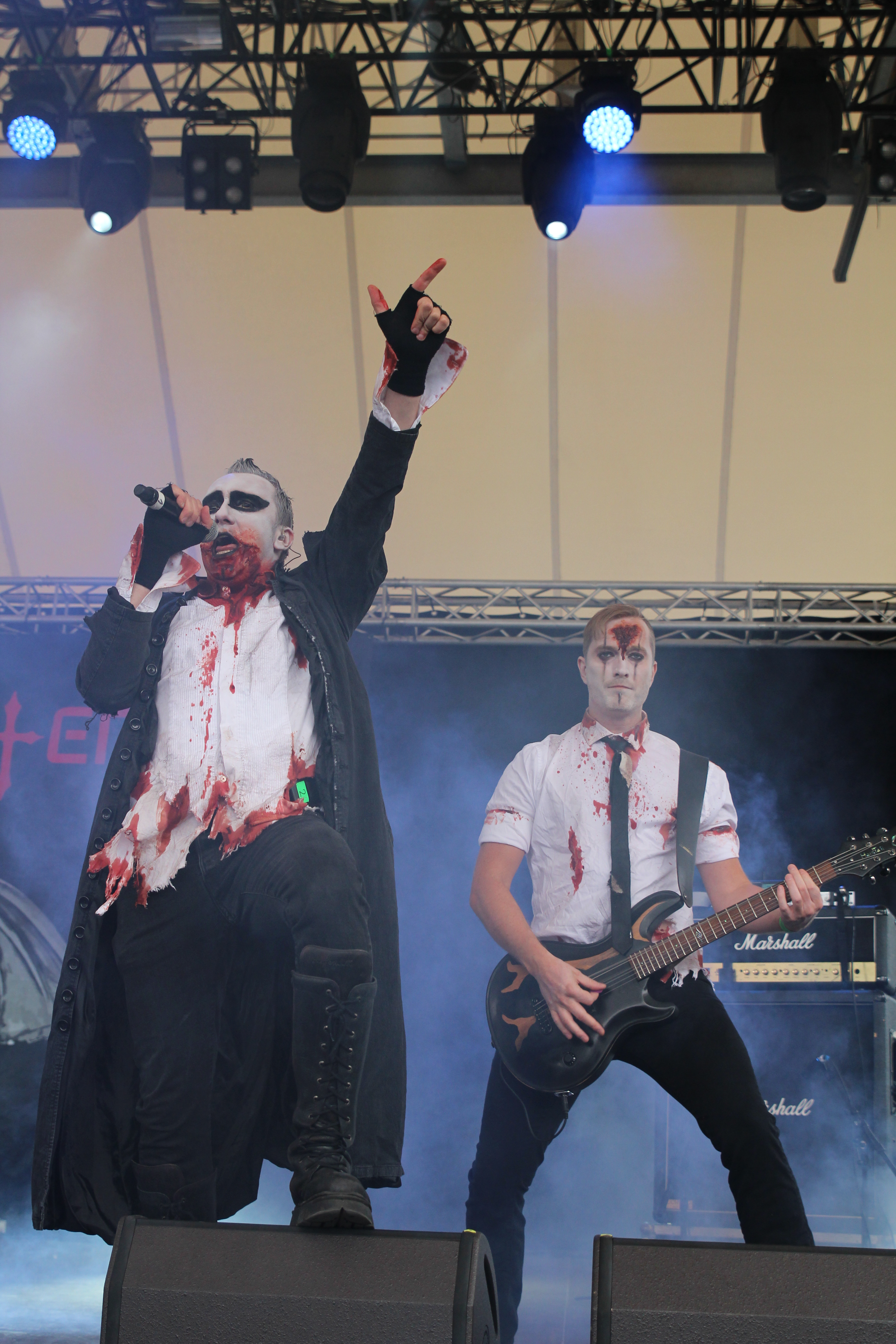
Gothminister at Blackfield Festival 2014 in Germany

=== Albums ===
List of albums, with selected details
Title	Details
Gothic Electronic Anthems	Released: 14 April 2003; Label: BMG, Drakkar, Soulfood, Tatra; Formats: Physical, digital download, streaming
Empire of Dark Salvation	Released: 4 April 2005; Label: BMG, Drakkar, e-Wave Records, Tatra, Tuba; Formats: Physical, digital download, streaming
Happiness in Darkness	Released: 25 November 2008; Label: AFM Records, e-Wave Records, Drakkar, Irond; Formats: Physical, digital download, streaming
Anima Inferna	Released: 25 March 2011; Label: BMG, Drakkar, e-Wave Records; Formats: Physical, digital download, streaming
Utopia	Released: 17 May 2013; Label: AFM Records; Formats: Physical, digital download, streaming
The Other Side	Released: 13 October 2017; Label: AFM Records; Formats: Physical, digital download, streaming
Pandemonium	Released: 21 October 2022; Label: AFM Records; Formats: Physical, digital download, streaming
Pandemonium II: The Battle of the Underworlds	Released: 3 May 2024; Label: AFM Records; Formats: Physical, digital download, streaming
We Are All Demons	Released: 16 October 2026; Label: AFM Records; Formats: Physical, digital download, streaming

=== Singles ===
Single	Year	Peak chart positions	Album or EP
Single	Year	GER (Alt)	Album or EP
"Angel"	2002	—	Gothic Electronic Anthems
"Devil"	2002	—	Gothic Electronic Anthems
"The Holy One"	2003	—	Gothic Electronic Anthems
"Dark Salvation"	2005	—	Empire of Dark Salvation
"Swallowed by the Earth"	2005	—	Empire of Dark Salvation
"Dusk Till Dawn"	2008	—	Happiness in Darkness
"Freak"	2009	—	Happiness in Darkness
"Liar"	2011	—	Anima Inferna
"Utopia"	2013	—	Utopia
"Der fliegende Mann"	2017	8	The Other Side
"The Sun"	2017	14	The Other Side
"Ich will alles"	2017	18	The Other Side
"We Are the Ones Who Rule the World"	2017	10	The Other Side
"Pandemonium"	2022	5	Pandemonium
"This is Your Darkness"	2022	1	Pandemonium
"Demons"	2022	8	Pandemonium
"Star"	2022	—	Pandemonium
"I Am the Devil"	2023	8	Pandemonium II: The Battle of the Underworlds
"Battle of the Underworlds"	2023	4	Pandemonium II: The Battle of the Underworlds
"We Come Alive"	2024	3	Pandemonium II: The Battle of the Underworlds
