= Drakkar Entertainment =

German record label

- Founded: 1986
- Founder: Bogdan Kopec
- Distributor: Edition Drakkar
- Genre: Heavy metal Electronic; Synthpop; Industrial metal
- Country of origin: Germany
- Location: Witten
- Official website: www.drakkar.de

Drakkar Entertainment GmbH, also called Drakkar Records or Drakkar Publishing, is a German record label with its headquarters in Witten. It is a joint venture with Bertelsmann Music Group.

== History ==
Originally Kopec Music Publishing, Drakkar Entertainment was founded in 1986 by Bogdan Kopec. It initially only handled publishing, but in 1986, when Kopec changed the name to "Drakkar Promotion", he also expanded its services to include management, booking, and merchandising. The company later signed German metal bands such as Raven, Running Wild, and Sodom.

In 1992, the company joined forces with Bertelsmann Music Group to become Drakkar Promotion Musikverlag GmbH. At the same time, another company, G.U.N. Records GmbH was created. This second company became so successful that Kopec, who felt overworked, decided to sell his shares to BMG. He then closed the merchandising, booking, and trading departments of Drakkar Promotion and founded "Drakkar Records". His original company became "Drakkar Entertainment GmbH".

=== Divisions ===
Drakkar Entertainment now has four divisions:

- Drakkar Classic, a label publishing rock and metal with orchestral accompaniment.
- Drakkar Records, their metal label.
- e-Wave Records, their electronic label.
- Edition Drakkar, their publishing company.

== Artists ==
- De/Vision
- Dezperadoz
- Diablo
- Double Experience
- Emil Bulls
- Eternal Tears of Sorrow (until 2006)
- Gothminister
- Grantig
- Haggard
- Jesus on Extasy
- Karelia
- The Killer Barbies
- Kreator (for Endorama)
- Letzte Instanz
- Lordi
- Loudness
- Lumsk
- Nightwish (until 2004)
- Odd Crew
- Omega Lithium
- Rebellion
- Sahg
- SETYØURSAILS
- The Sorrow
- The Wakes
- Twisted Sister
- Xandria (until 2011)
- Zeraphine
