= Thanatos (disambiguation) =

Thanatos is the Ancient Greek personification of death.

Thanatos may also refer to:

== Arts and entertainment ==
=== Music ===
- Thanatos (band), a Dutch extreme metal band
- Thanatos (Relatives Menschein album), the 2002 album by Relatives Menschsein
- Thanatos (Atlas Sound album), the 2026 album by Atlas Sound
- "Thanatos", a song by The Skids from the 1979 album Days in Europa
- "Thanatos", a character and track on the 2008 Sound Horizon album Moira
- "Thanatos", a song by Soap&Skin from the 2009 album Lovetune for Vacuum
- "Thanatos -If I Can't Be Yours-", a song in the Neon Genesis Evangelion franchise
- "Thanatos (End of Us)", a song by Janani K. Jha from the 2024 album The Rest of the Laurels

=== Fictional characters ===
- Thanatos (comics), from Marvel Comics
- Thanatos (Saint Seiya), a manga character
- Thanatos, from the fantasy book Incarnations of Immortality
- Thanatos, from TV cartoon series Chris Colorado
- Thanatos, from the video game Secret of Mana
- Thanatos, from the video game Chaos Legion
- Thanatos, from the video game Hades (video game)
- Thanatos, from the video game Persona 3
- Thanatos, from the video game Zenless Zone Zero
- Thanatos, from the video game Honkai: Star Rail

=== Other uses in arts and entertainment ===
- Thanatos (video game), 1986
- The Thanatos, a derelict spaceship and main setting of the top-down shooter Aliens: Thanatos Encounter

== Other uses ==
- Thanatos (psychoanalysis), or death drive, in classical Freudian psychoanalytic theory
- Thanatos, a synonym for Bothriechis venomous pit vipers

== See also ==
- Xanatos (disambiguation)
- Thanatus, a genus of false crab spiders
- Thanatomorphose, a 2012 horror film
