= Me and the Devil Blues =

- Original 78 record label

Single by Robert Johnson
- Released: 1938
- Recorded: June 19, 1937
- Studio: Dallas, Texas
- Genre: Delta blues
- Length: 2:37 (take 1); 2:29 (take 2)
- Label: Vocalion
- Songwriter: Robert Johnson
- Producer: Don Law

"Me and the Devil Blues" is a blues song by Robert Johnson, released as a single in 1938. It tells the story of the singer's waking up one morning to the devil knocking on the door, telling him that "it's time to go."

The lyrics concluded with the lines "You may bury my body down by the highway side" / "So my old evil spirit can catch a Greyhound bus and ride." Johnson recorded the song, among others, in a warehouse in Dallas, that served as a makeshift recording studio, on June 19, 1937. It was his final recording session.

Austrian recording artist Soap&Skin covered the song on her 2013 EP Sugarbread. The cover was featured in the Germany TV series Dark (S1, Ep5). It then went viral on TikTok between 2024 and 2025. Another notable cover is Gil Scott-Heron's industrial adaptation on his 2010 album I'm New Here. Which is where the chord structure of the Soap&Skin cover comes from.
