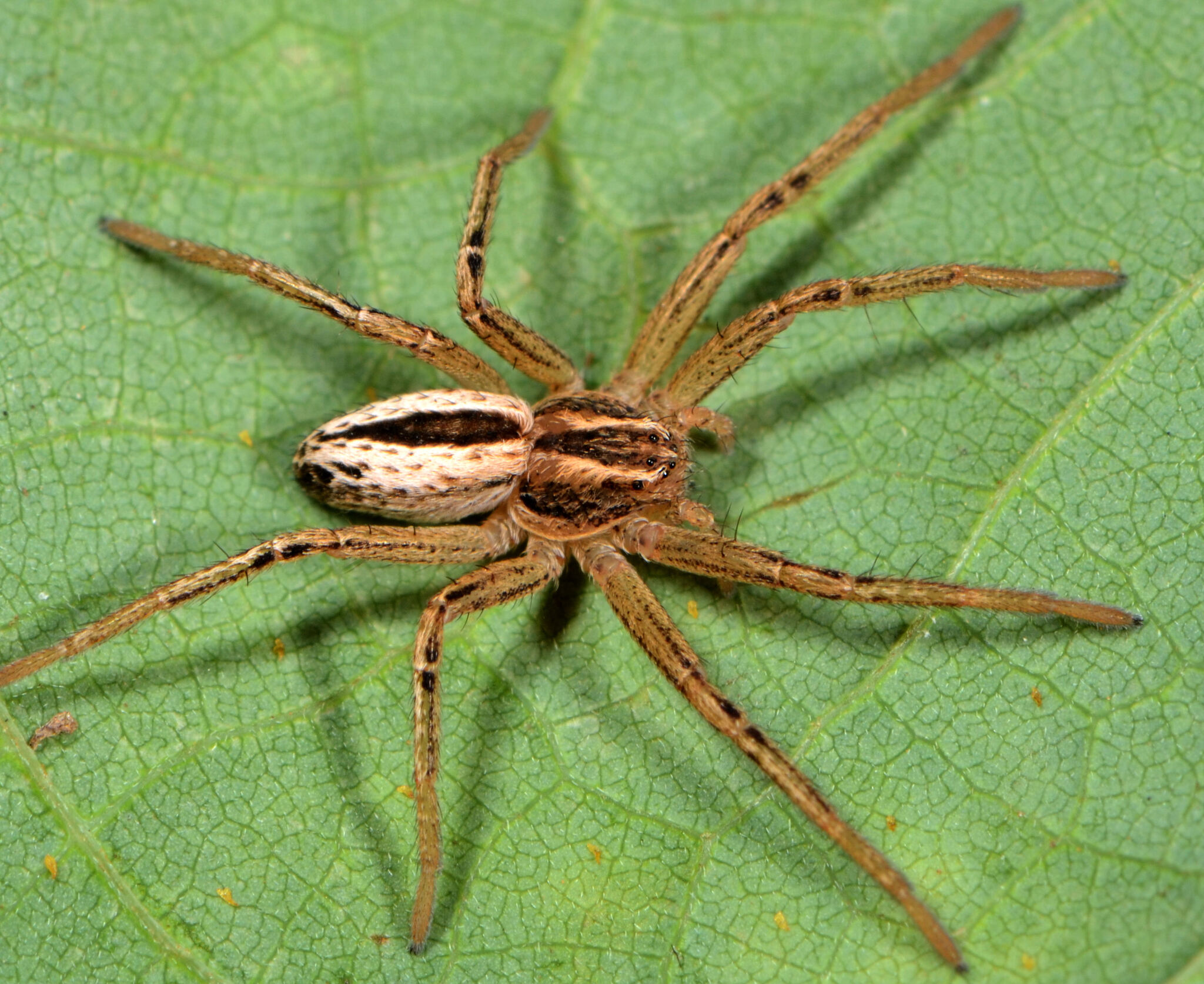
- female
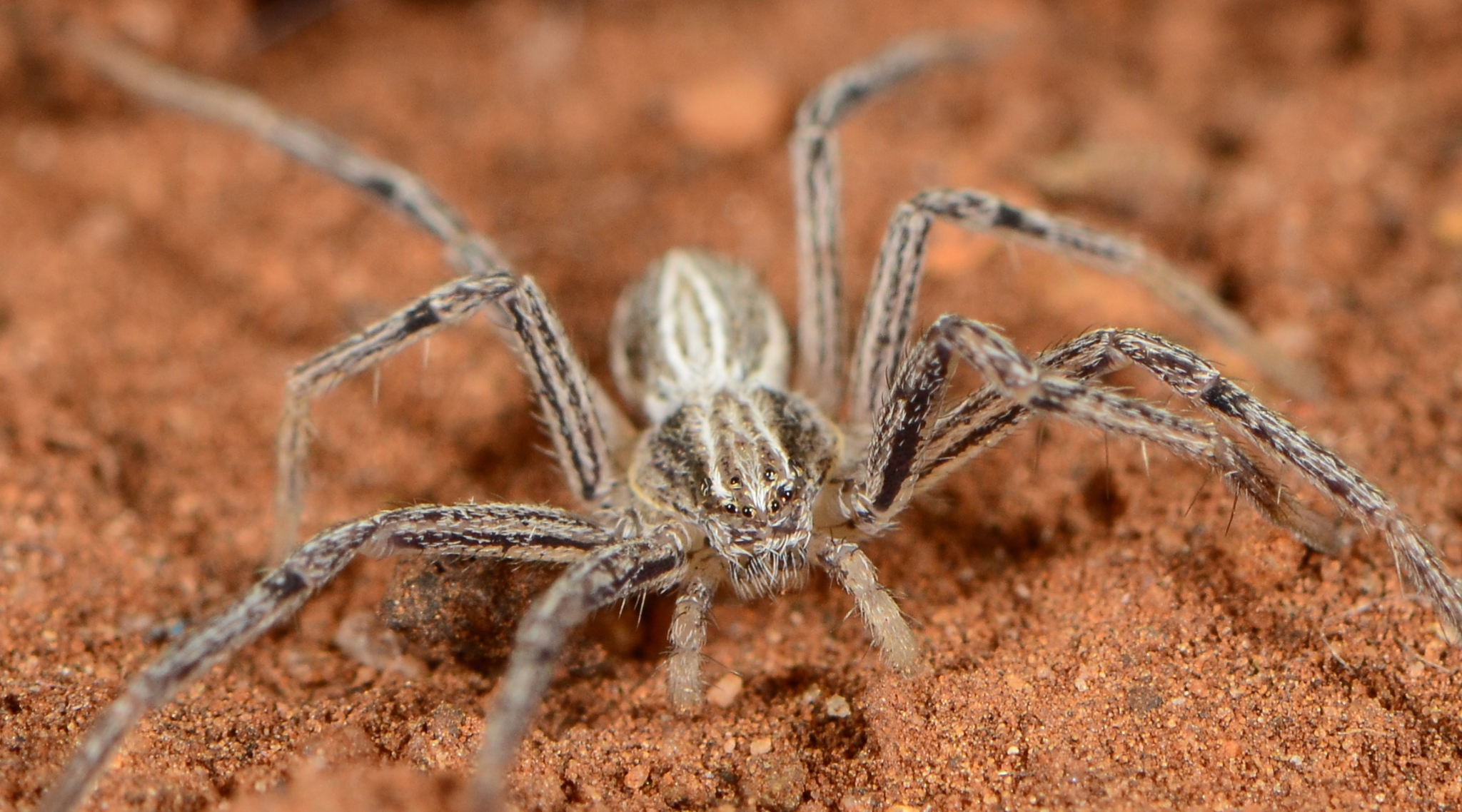
- female

Scientific classification
- Kingdom: Animalia
- Phylum: Arthropoda
- Subphylum: Chelicerata
- Class: Arachnida
- Order: Araneae
- Infraorder: Araneomorphae
- Family: Philodromidae
- Genus: Thanatus
- Species: T. dorsilineatus

Binomial name
- Thanatus dorsilineatus Jézéquel, 1964

= Thanatus dorsilineatus =

Striped Legged Ground Running Spider

Species of spider

Thanatus dorsilineatus is a species of spider in the family Philodromidae. It is commonly known as the striped legged ground running spider.

== Etymology ==
The specific name means "marked with line(s) on the back".

== Distribution ==
Thanatus dorsilineatus is known from Botswana, Ivory Coast, and South Africa. In South Africa, it is known from seven provinces and more than 10 protected areas, at altitudes of 1-1909 m above sea level.

== Habitat and ecology ==
These are free-living plant dwellers sampled with sweep nets from the Grassland, Indian Ocean Coastal Belt and Savanna biomes. They have also been sampled from maize fields.

== Description ==
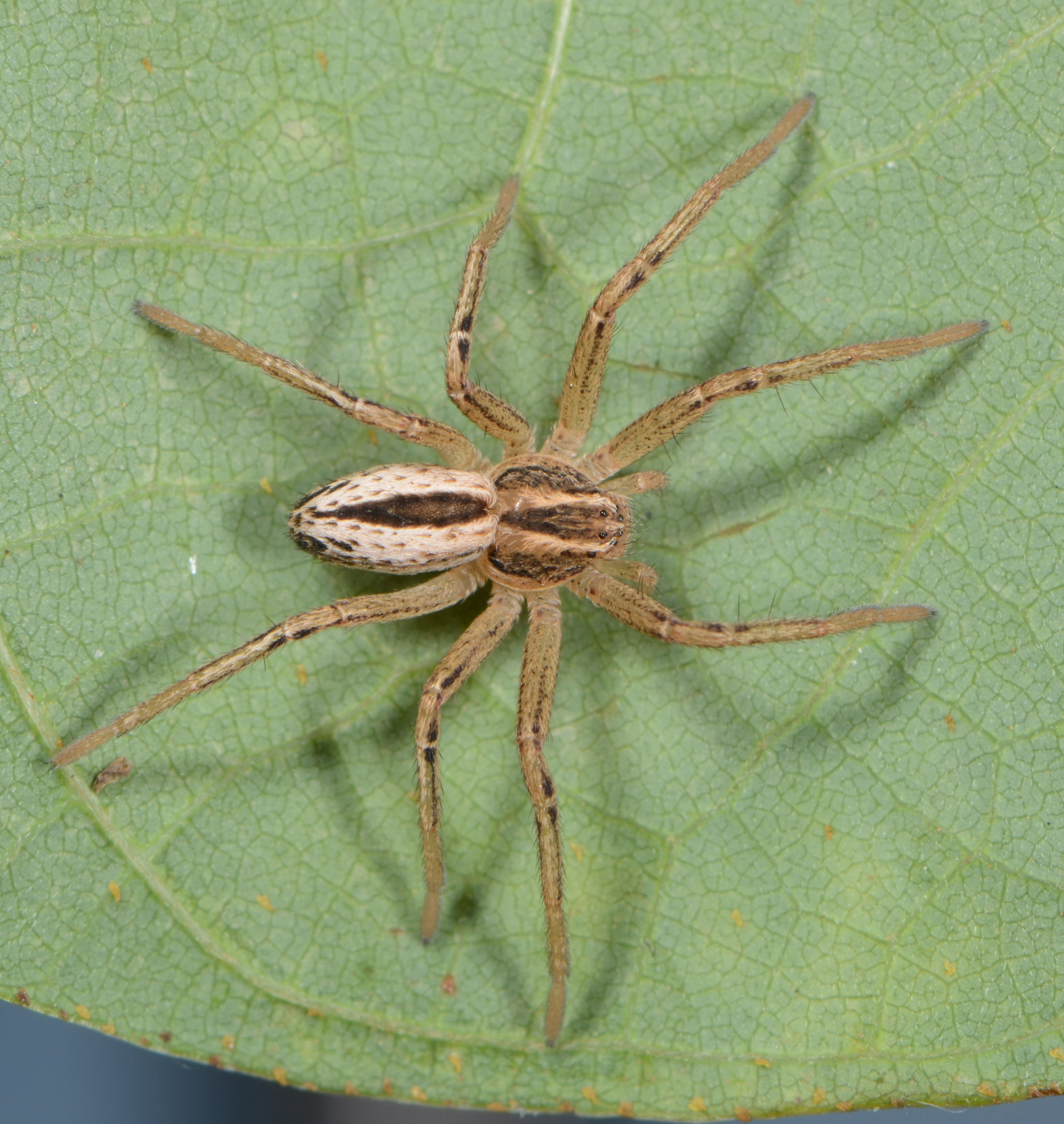
female

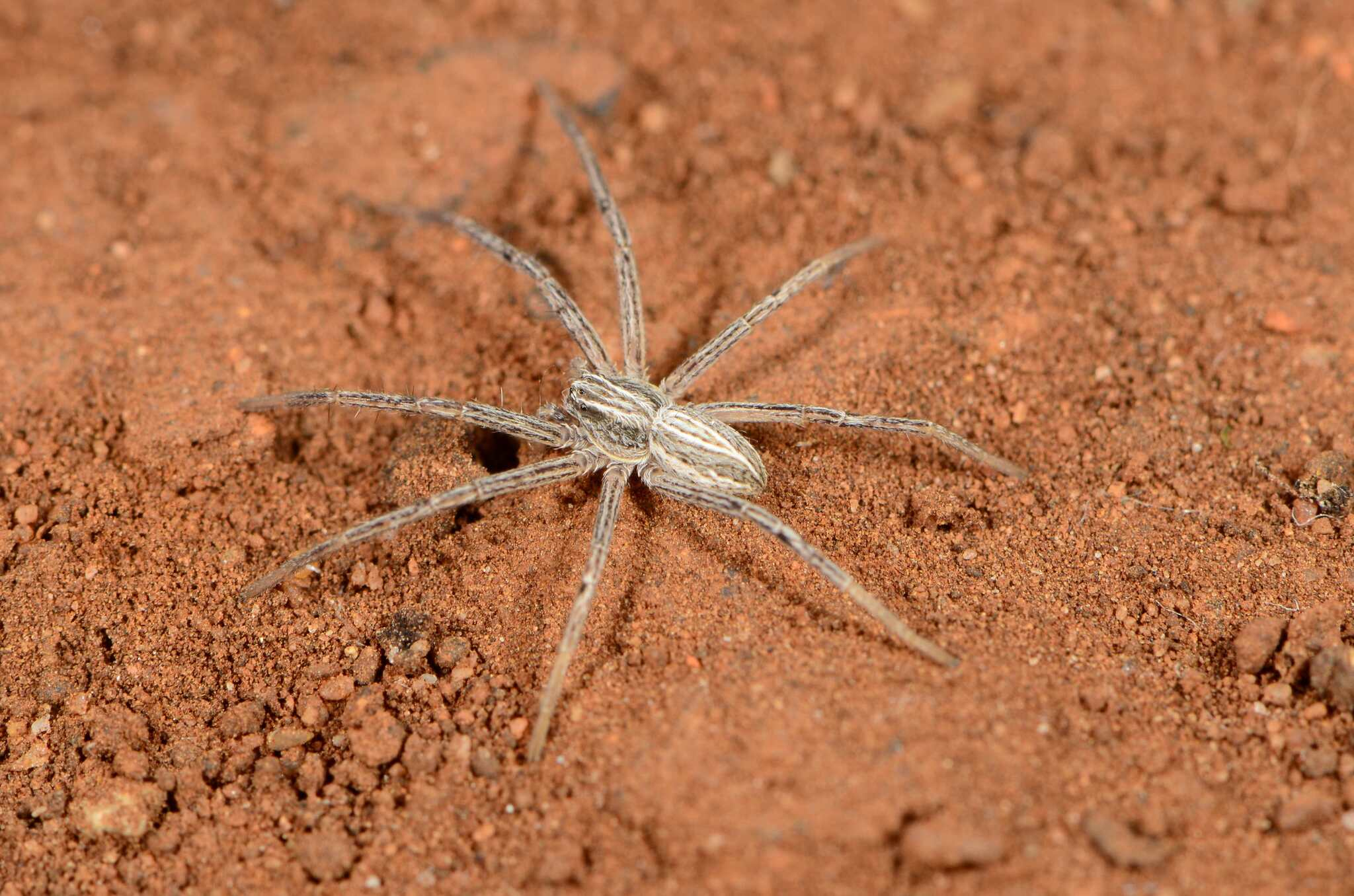
female

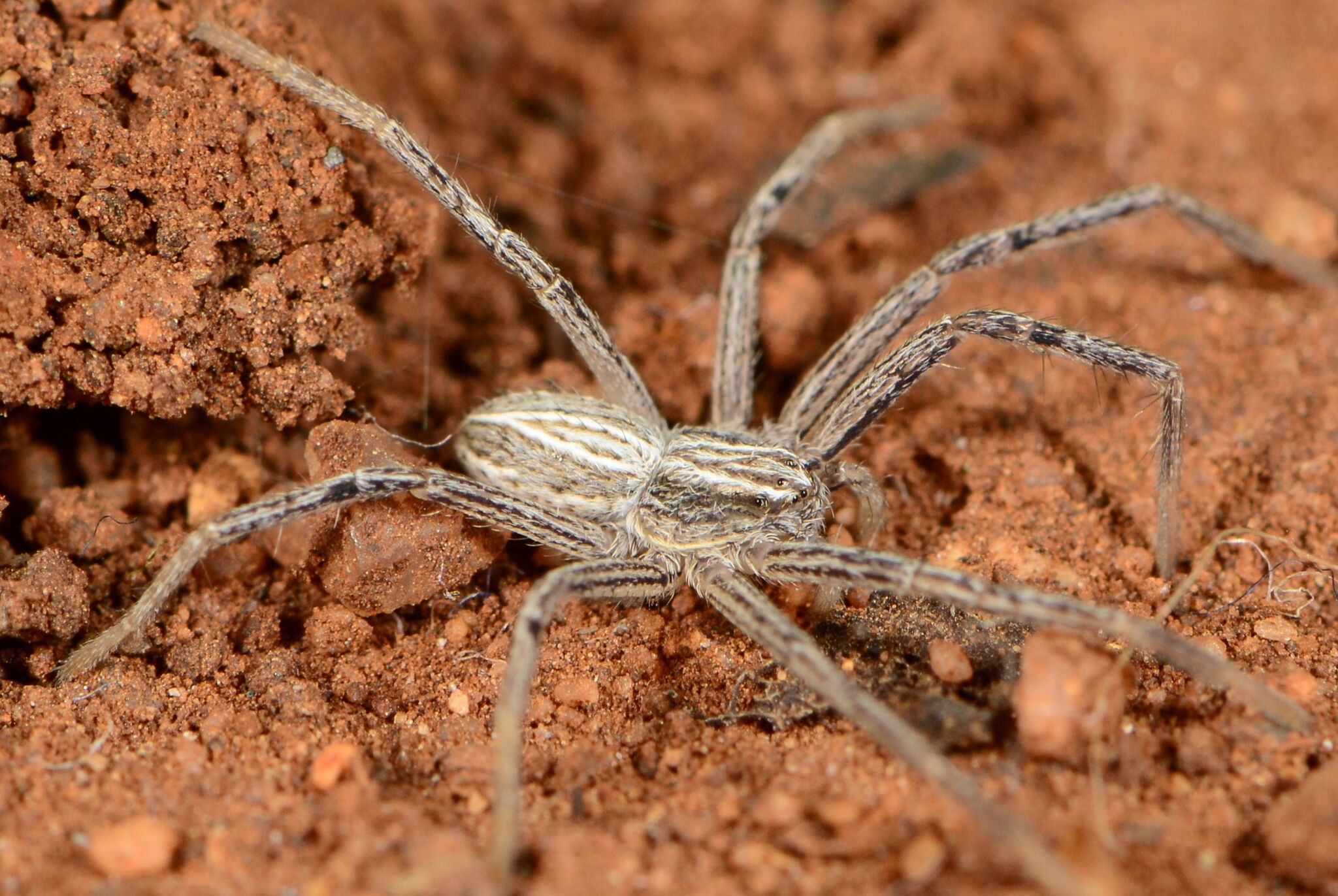
female

== Conservation ==
Thanatus dorsilineatus is listed as Least Concern by the South African National Biodiversity Institute due to its wide geographical range. The species is protected in 11 protected areas such as Blouberg Nature Reserve, Mkambati Nature Reserve and Lekgalameetse Nature Reserve.

== Taxonomy ==
The species was originally described by Jézéquel (1964) from the Ivory Coast. The African species have not been revised and the species is known from both sexes.
