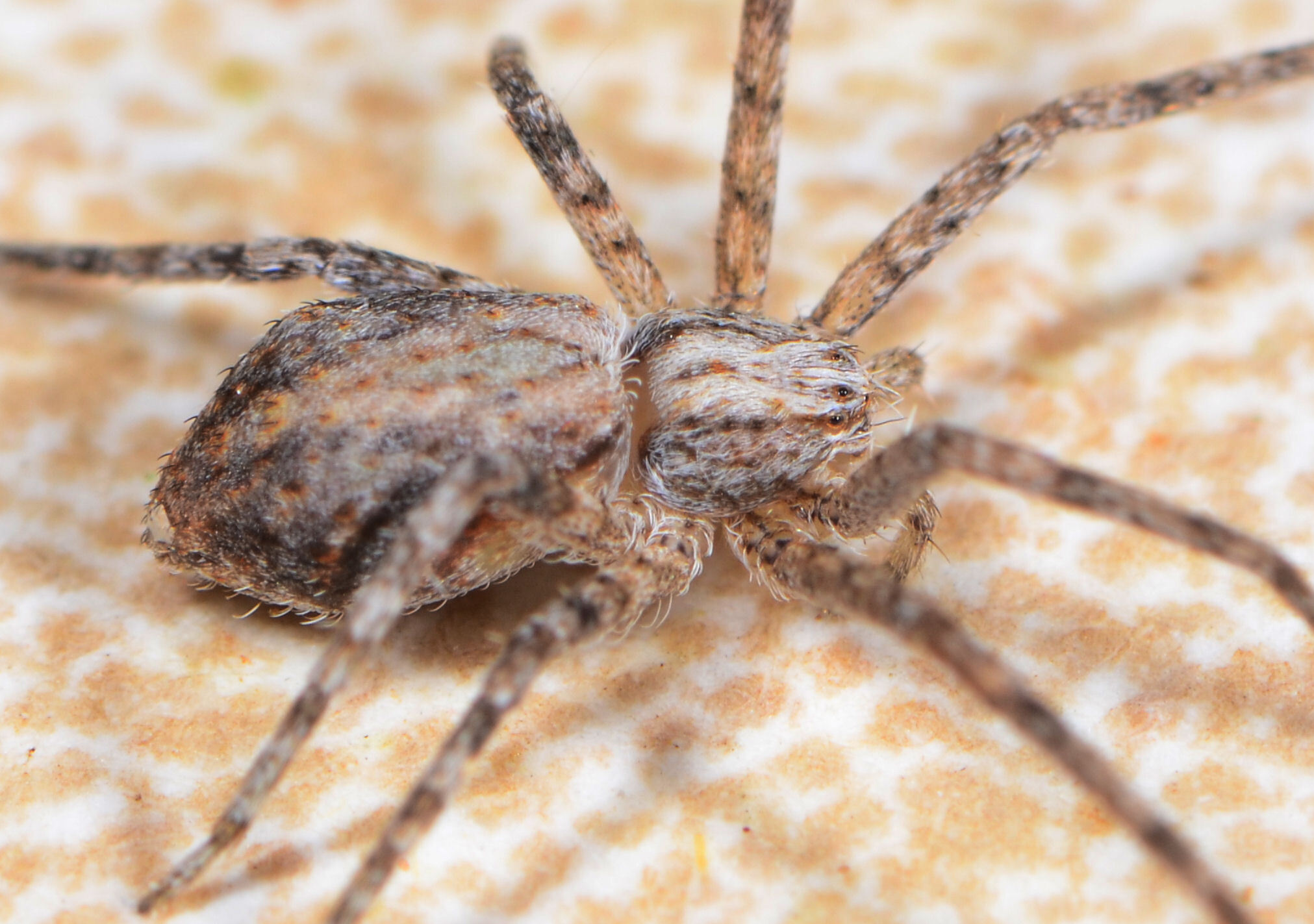
- female

Scientific classification
- Kingdom: Animalia
- Phylum: Arthropoda
- Subphylum: Chelicerata
- Class: Arachnida
- Order: Araneae
- Infraorder: Araneomorphae
- Family: Philodromidae
- Genus: Thanatus
- Species: T. lamottei

Binomial name
- Thanatus lamottei Jézéquel, 1964

= Thanatus lamottei =

Lamotte's Ground Running Spider

Species of spider

Thanatus lamottei is a species of spider in the family Philodromidae. It is commonly known as Lamotte's ground running spider.

== Distribution ==
Thanatus lamottei is known from Ivory Coast and South Africa. In South Africa, it was recorded from two provinces at altitudes of 50-898 m above sea level.

== Habitat and ecology ==
Thanatus lamottei was collected with sweep nets from the Fynbos and Savanna biomes.

== Conservation ==
Thanatus lamottei is listed as Least Concern by the South African National Biodiversity Institute due to its wide range. In South Africa, the species is protected in the Kogelberg Biosphere Reserve and Ben Lavin Nature Reserve.

== Taxonomy ==
The species was originally described by Jézéquel (1964) from the Ivory Coast. The African species have not been revised and the species is known from both sexes.
