= Thanatus fabricii =

Fabrici's Ground Running Spider

Conservation status
- Least Concern (SANBI Red List)

Scientific classification
- Kingdom: Animalia
- Phylum: Arthropoda
- Subphylum: Chelicerata
- Class: Arachnida
- Order: Araneae
- Infraorder: Araneomorphae
- Family: Philodromidae
- Genus: Thanatus
- Species: T. fabricii

Binomial name
- Thanatus fabricii (Audouin, 1826)

Species of spider

Thanatus fabricii is a species of spider in the family Philodromidae. It is commonly known as Fabrici's ground running spider.

== Etymology ==
This species is named after Johan Christian Fabricius (1745–1808), one of the most important entomologists of the 18th century.

== Distribution ==
Thanatus fabricii has a wide distribution from the Canary Islands to Central Asia and Africa. In South Africa, it is recorded from two provinces at altitudes of 1246–1328 m above sea level.

== Habitat and ecology ==
Thanatus fabricii was collected with sweep nets from the Savanna biome.

== Conservation ==
Thanatus fabricii is listed as Least Concern by the South African National Biodiversity Institute due to its wide geographical range. No conservation actions are recommended for this widespread species.

== Taxonomy ==
The species was originally described by Audouin (1826) as Philodromus fabricii. The African species have not been revised and the species is known from both sexes.
