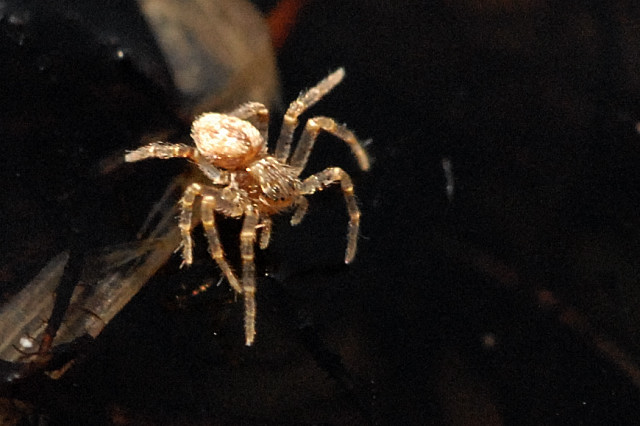

Scientific classification
- Domain: Eukaryota
- Kingdom: Animalia
- Phylum: Arthropoda
- Subphylum: Chelicerata
- Class: Arachnida
- Order: Araneae
- Infraorder: Araneomorphae
- Family: Philodromidae
- Genus: Thanatus
- Species: T. striatus

Binomial name
- Thanatus striatus C. L. Koch, 1845

= Thanatus striatus =

Species of spider

Thanatus striatus is a species of running crab spider in the family Philodromidae. It is found in North America, Europe, Turkey, a range from Russia (European to Far East), and Central Asia.
