= Die Ewigkeit =

Studio album by Relatives Menschsein
- Released: (Germany) July 2, 1993
- Studios: Danse Macabre Studios, Bayreuth
- Genres: electronic music Gothic; Darkwave
- Label: Alice In... (Germany)
- Producers: Relatives Menschsein, Horst Braun

Relatives Menschsein chronology
Gefallene Engel (1992)	Die Ewigkeit (1993)	Thanatos (2002)

Die Ewigkeit is the second release from German electronic/darkwave band Relatives Menschsein.

== Track listing ==
1. "Ausgeblutet"-4:39
2. "In Gedanken"-2:39
3. "Erfüllung"-5:01
4. "Leben"-3:44
5. "Passion"-4:34
6. "Verflucht"-7:12
7. "Die Ewigkeit"-6:28
8. "Tempel (Remastered Demo Version)"-3:07

== Info ==
- All tracks written by Lissy Mödl
- Vocals by Amadeus
- Guitars by Jörg Wolfgram
