= Thanatus flavidus =

Scientific classification
- Kingdom: Animalia
- Phylum: Arthropoda
- Subphylum: Chelicerata
- Class: Arachnida
- Order: Araneae
- Infraorder: Araneomorphae
- Family: Philodromidae
- Genus: Thanatus
- Species: T. flavidus

Binomial name
- Thanatus flavidus Simon, 1875

Species of spider

Thanatus flavidus is a spider in the family Philodromidae, native to Greece, Ukraine and European Russia. It has been noted for hunting bedbugs. The males have been filmed biting the females legs, binding her body with silk and mating. Once mating has finished the male runs away.
