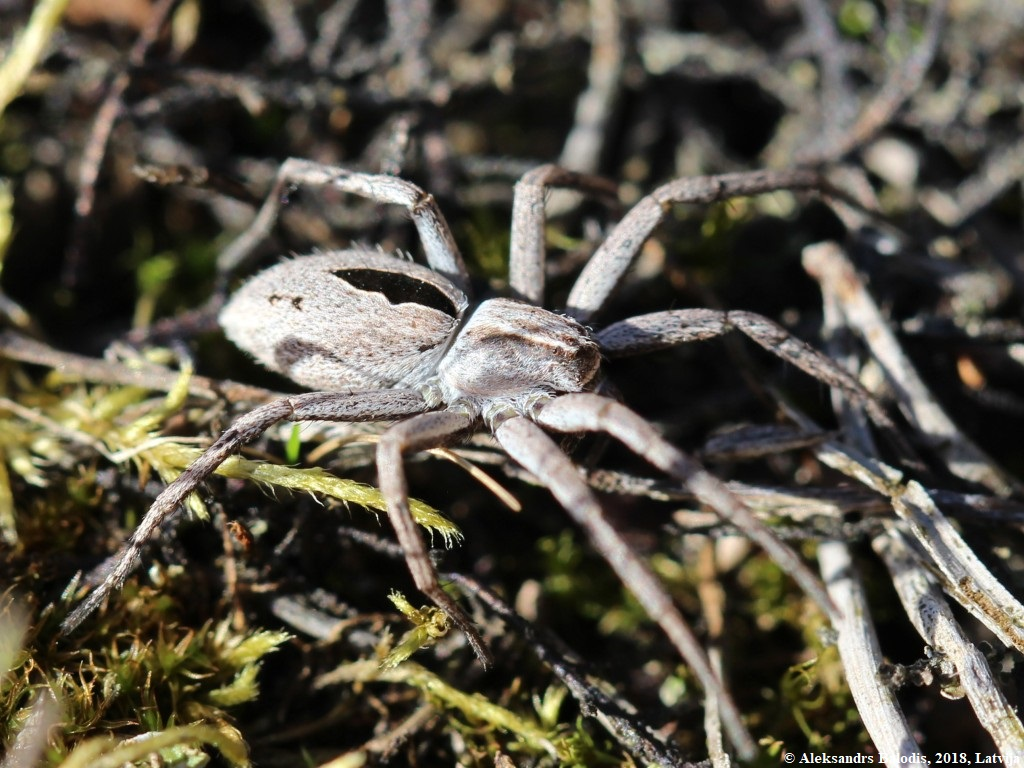
- Thanatus formicinus

Scientific classification
- Kingdom: Animalia
- Phylum: Arthropoda
- Subphylum: Chelicerata
- Class: Arachnida
- Order: Araneae
- Infraorder: Araneomorphae
- Family: Philodromidae
- Genus: Thanatus
- Species: T. formicinus

Binomial name
- Thanatus formicinus (Clerck, 1757)

Synonyms
- Araneus formicinus Clerck, 1757; Aranea formicina (Clerck, 1757); Philodromus formicinus (Clerck, 1757); Aranea rhomboica Walckenaer, 1802; Thomisus rhomboicus (Walckenaer, 1802); Thanatus rhomboicus (Walckenaer, 1802); Aranea testacea Panzer, 1804; Philodromus rhombiferens Walckenaer, 1826; Thanatus nigromaculatus Kulczyński, 1885; Thanatus lycosoides Emerton, 1892; Thanatus pictus Müller & Schenkel, 1895; Thanatus canadensis Gertsch, 1933; Thanatus aridorum Šilhavý, 1940

= Thanatus formicinus =

Species of spider

Thanatus formicinus, the diamond spider, diamondback spider or ant running crab spider, is a species of running crab spider belonging to the family Philodromidae. This species has a Holarctic distribution.

== Taxonomy ==
Thanatus formicinus was first formally described as Araneus formicinus in Aranei Svecici. Svenska spindlar, uti sina hufvud-slågter indelte samt under några och sextio särskildte arter beskrefne och med illuminerade figurer uplyste published in 1757 and written by the Swedish entomologist and arachnologist Carl Alexander Clerck. This species is now classified as one of thirty six species belonging to the genus Thanatus, a genus proposed in 1837 by Carl Ludwig Koch with Araneus formicinus designated as its type species, within the family Philidromidae.

== Description ==
Thanatus formicinus is sexually dimorphic, although the males and females are similar in colour and pattern the male is markedly smaller than the female with a body length of 5.2mm to 7.4mm compared to the females' body length of 6.9mm to 12mm. The abdomen is pale brown to greyish brown with a clear, white margined rhomboidal mark and there may be two slender, arced black lines at the rear. The carapace is similar in colour to the abdomen but with a light central band. The legs and palps are also a similar colour to the abdomen although there are few black spots on the legs. The males resemble the females in colour and markings although they are typically darker.

== Distribution and habitat ==
Thanatus formicinus has a Holarctic distribution and is found in North America, Europe and Asia, as far east as Japan, and it also occurs in Iraq, Iran, Turkey and North Africa. It has been introduced to Svalbard. In the United Kingdom the diamondback spider has always been rare and was known from three sites in southern England before 1969, but was not recorded after then until a population was discovered in Clumber Park in Nottinghamshire in 2017. This species is generally found in dry and semi-dry meadows and warm, dry forest steppes. In Britain it is found in bogs dominated by sphagnum with Molinia caerulea and some heather.
