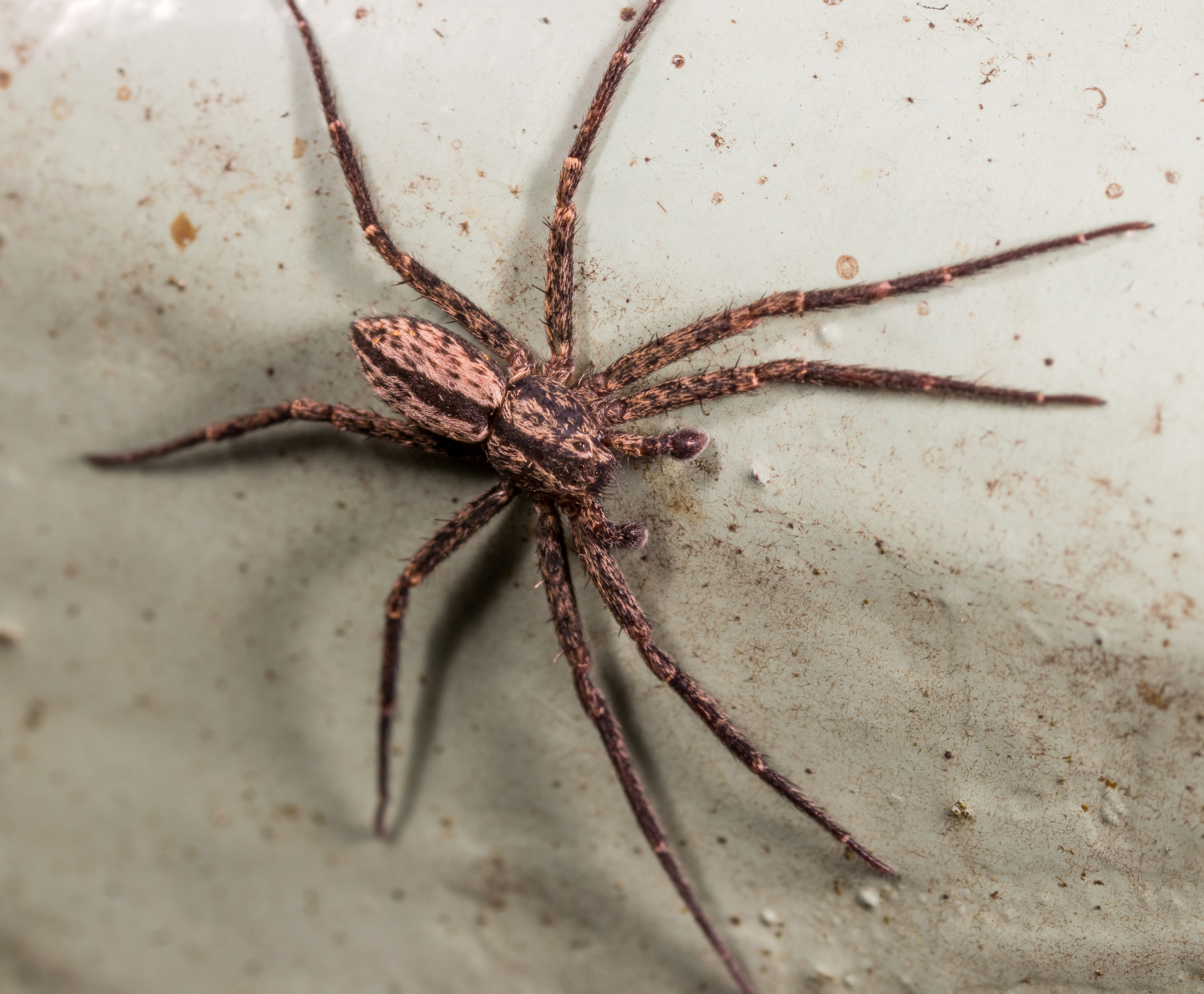
- male from Hong Kong

Scientific classification
- Kingdom: Animalia
- Phylum: Arthropoda
- Subphylum: Chelicerata
- Class: Arachnida
- Order: Araneae
- Infraorder: Araneomorphae
- Family: Philodromidae
- Genus: Thanatus
- Species: T. hongkong

Binomial name
- Thanatus hongkong Song, Zhu & Wu, 1997

= Thanatus hongkong =

Species of spider

Thanatus hongkong is a species of spider in the family Philodromidae. It is known only from Hong Kong.

== Taxonomy ==
Thanatus hongkong was first described in 1997 by Song, Zhu & Wu based on a male holotype collected from Tai Mo Shan in Hong Kong. The species remains known only from the male, as the female has not yet been described.

== Distribution ==
T. hongkong is known only from Hong Kong and surrounding areas. The holotype was collected on Tai Mo Shan in Hong Kong in 1995.

== Description ==
The male of T. hongkong has a total body length of 3.43 mm, with the cephalothorax measuring 1.42 mm in length and 1.29 mm in width. The abdomen is 2.01 mm long and 0.79 mm wide. The cephalothorax is brownish-yellow in color with numerous light brown flat hairs.

The eye arrangement is characteristic of the genus, with the anterior median eyes being larger than the anterior lateral eyes. The anterior eye row is recurved while the posterior eye row is straight. Each eye has a black rim, with the posterior lateral eyes being the largest.

The legs are light brownish-yellow in color, with the front and rear surfaces bearing black spots. The first, second, and fourth legs have black coloration on the distal portions of their segments, along with black hairs. The leg formula is 2,4,1,3, indicating the relative lengths of the leg pairs.

The species is most similar to Thanatus miniaceus Simon, 1880, but can be distinguished by differences in the shape of the male palpal bulb and tibial apophysis.
