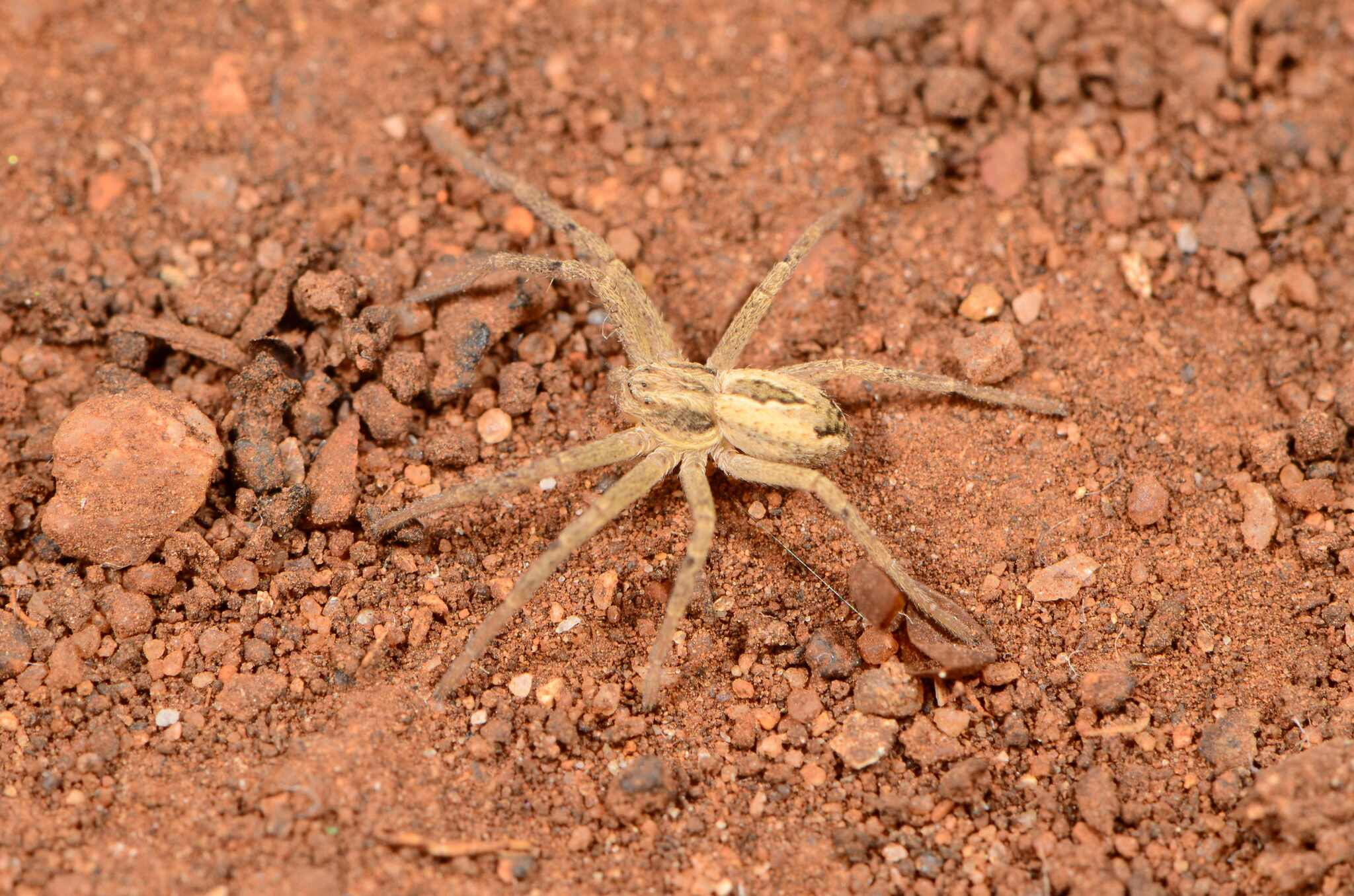

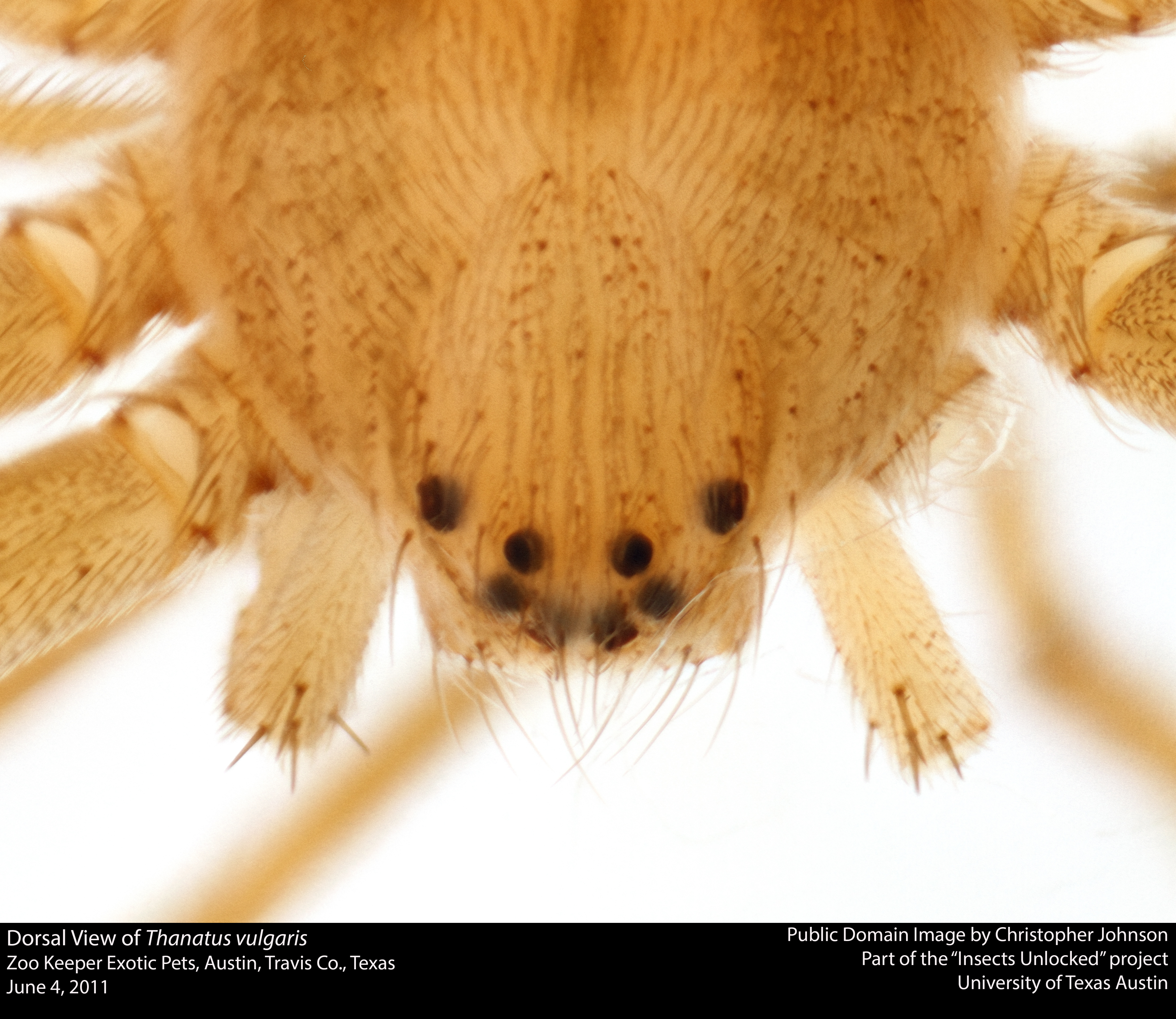

Scientific classification
- Kingdom: Animalia
- Phylum: Arthropoda
- Subphylum: Chelicerata
- Class: Arachnida
- Order: Araneae
- Infraorder: Araneomorphae
- Family: Philodromidae
- Genus: Thanatus
- Species: T. vulgaris

Binomial name
- Thanatus vulgaris Simon, 1870

= Thanatus vulgaris =

Species of spider

Thanatus vulgaris is a species of running crab spider in the family Philodromidae. It is found in North America, Europe, North Africa, Turkey, Israel/Palestine, Caucasus, a range from Russia (European to Far East), Central Asia, China, and Korea.

== Distribution ==
Thanatus vulgaris has a very wide global distribution including North America, North Africa, Europe to the Far East, and Central Asia.

In South Africa, it is known from eight provinces including more than 10 protected areas, at altitudes of 7-1795 m above sea level.

== Habitat and ecology ==
Thanatus vulgaris is an introduced species in many parts of the world. These are common free-living ground and plant dwellers.

In South Africa, they were sampled in pitfall traps from the Fynbos, Grassland, Nama Karoo, Savanna and Thicket biomes. The species has also been sampled from agro-ecosystems such as cotton, lucerne, maize, potatoes and strawberries.

== Description ==
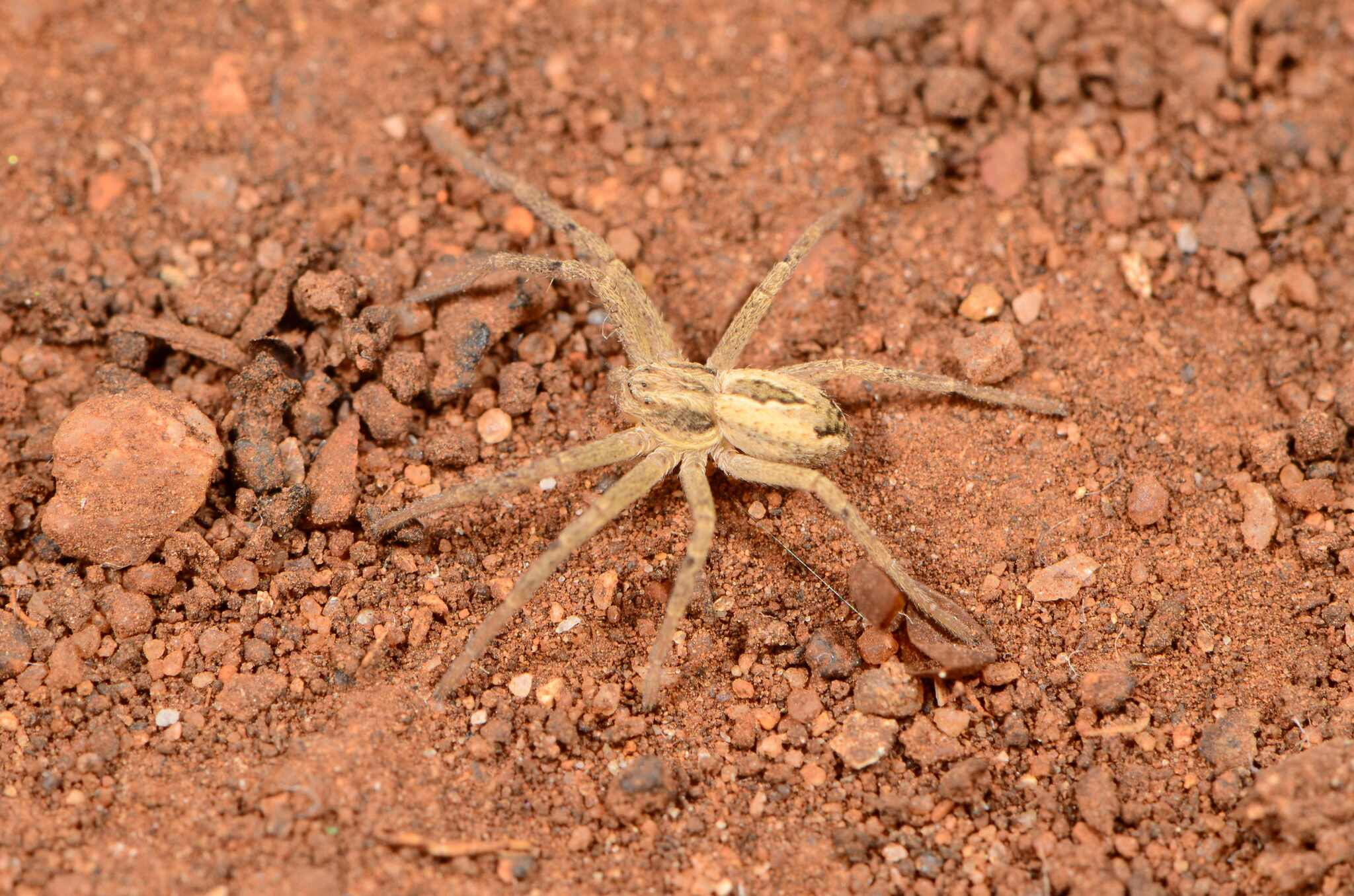
female

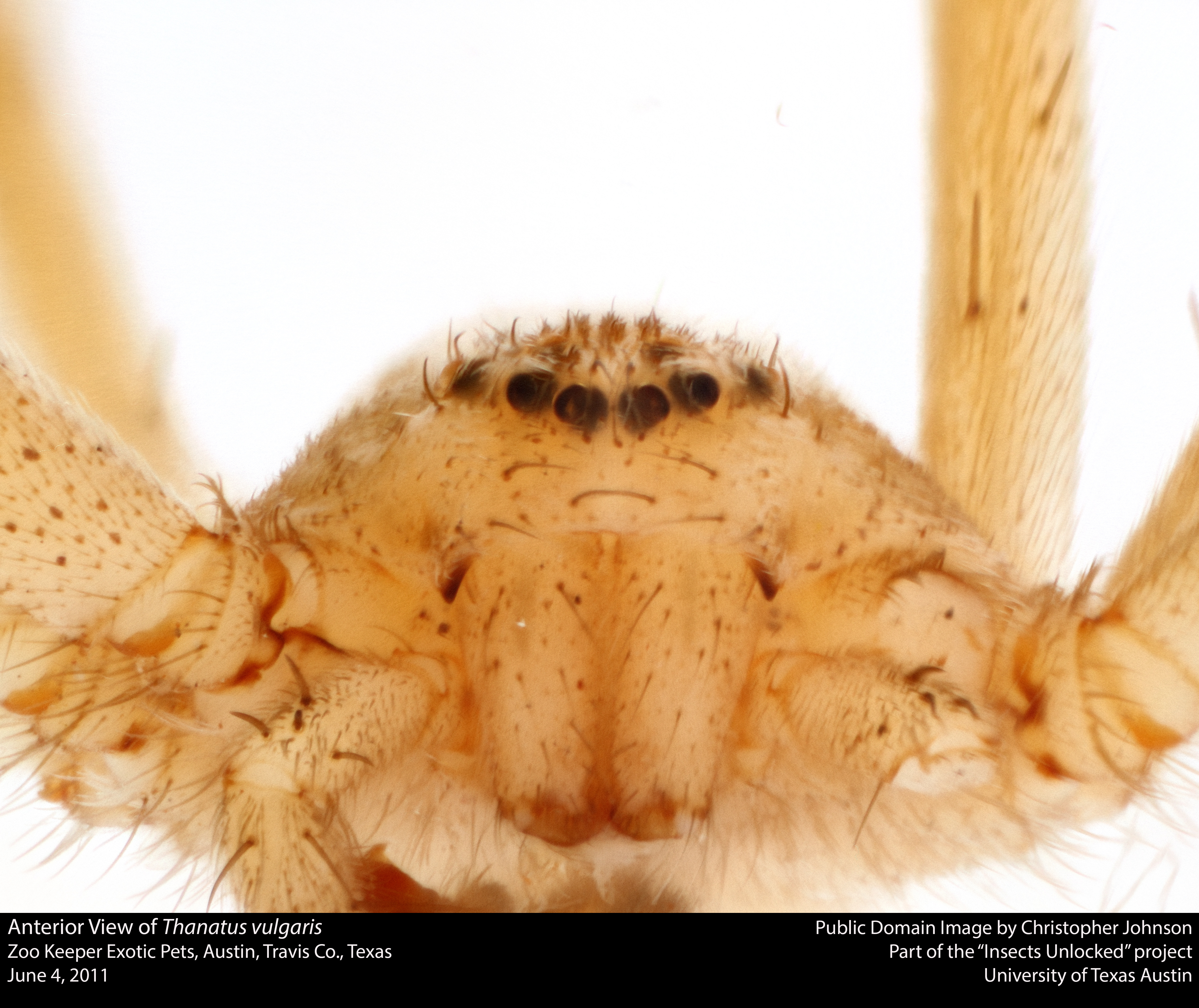

== Conservation ==
Thanatus vulgaris is listed as Least Concern by the South African National Biodiversity Institute due to its wide geographical range. The species is protected in several protected areas such as Blouberg Nature Reserve and Amanzi Nature Reserve. No conservation actions are recommended.

== Subspecies ==
These two subspecies belong to the species Thanatus vulgaris:

- (Thanatus vulgaris vulgaris) Simon, 1870
- Thanatus vulgaris creticus Kulczynski, 1903
