= Sugarbread (EP) =

EP by Soap&Skin
- Released: March 11, 2013
- Genres: Experimental; neoclassical dark wave; post-industrial; electronica
- Length: 9:15
- Label: PIAS

Soap&Skin chronology
Narrow (2012)	Sugarbread (2013)	From Gas to Solid / You Are My Friend (2018)

Professional ratings
Review scores
Source	Rating
Drowned in Sound	7/10 stars
Peek-a-boo Magazine	9/10 stars

Sugarbread is the third EP by Soap&Skin. It was released on March 11, 2013 by PIAS Recordings. The EP contains three tracks. The second of them, "Me And The Devil", is an interpretation of the song of the same name by American blues musician Robert Johnson. The song appeared in numerous television shows including, Dark, The Girlfriend and The Traitors, becoming one of Plaschg's most successful songs to date.

== Track listing ==
All tracks are written by Anja Plaschg, except where noted.

No.	Title	Writer(s)	Length
1.	"Sugarbread"		3:35
2.	"Me and the Devil"	Robert Johnson	3:05
3.	"Pray"		2:35
Total length:			9:15
