= Thanatus namaquensis =

Scientific classification
- Kingdom: Animalia
- Phylum: Arthropoda
- Subphylum: Chelicerata
- Class: Arachnida
- Order: Araneae
- Infraorder: Araneomorphae
- Family: Philodromidae
- Genus: Thanatus
- Species: T. namaquensis

Binomial name
- Thanatus namaquensis Simon, 1910

Species of spider

Thanatus namaquensis is a species of spider in the family Philodromidae. It is commonly known as the Namaque ground running spider.

== Distribution ==
Thanatus namaquensis is endemic to South Africa. The species is known only from the type locality Kamaggas in the Northern Cape, at an altitude of 231 m above sea level.

== Habitat and ecology ==
Thanatus namaquensis are free-living ground dwellers sampled from the Succulent Karoo biome.

== Conservation ==
Thanatus namaquensis is listed as Data Deficient for Taxonomic reasons. The species is a Northern Cape endemic known only from the type locality. The status of the species remains obscure and more sampling is needed to collect the male and determine the species range.

== Taxonomy ==
The species was originally described by Simon (1910) from Kamaggas. The African species have not been revised and the species is known only from the female.
