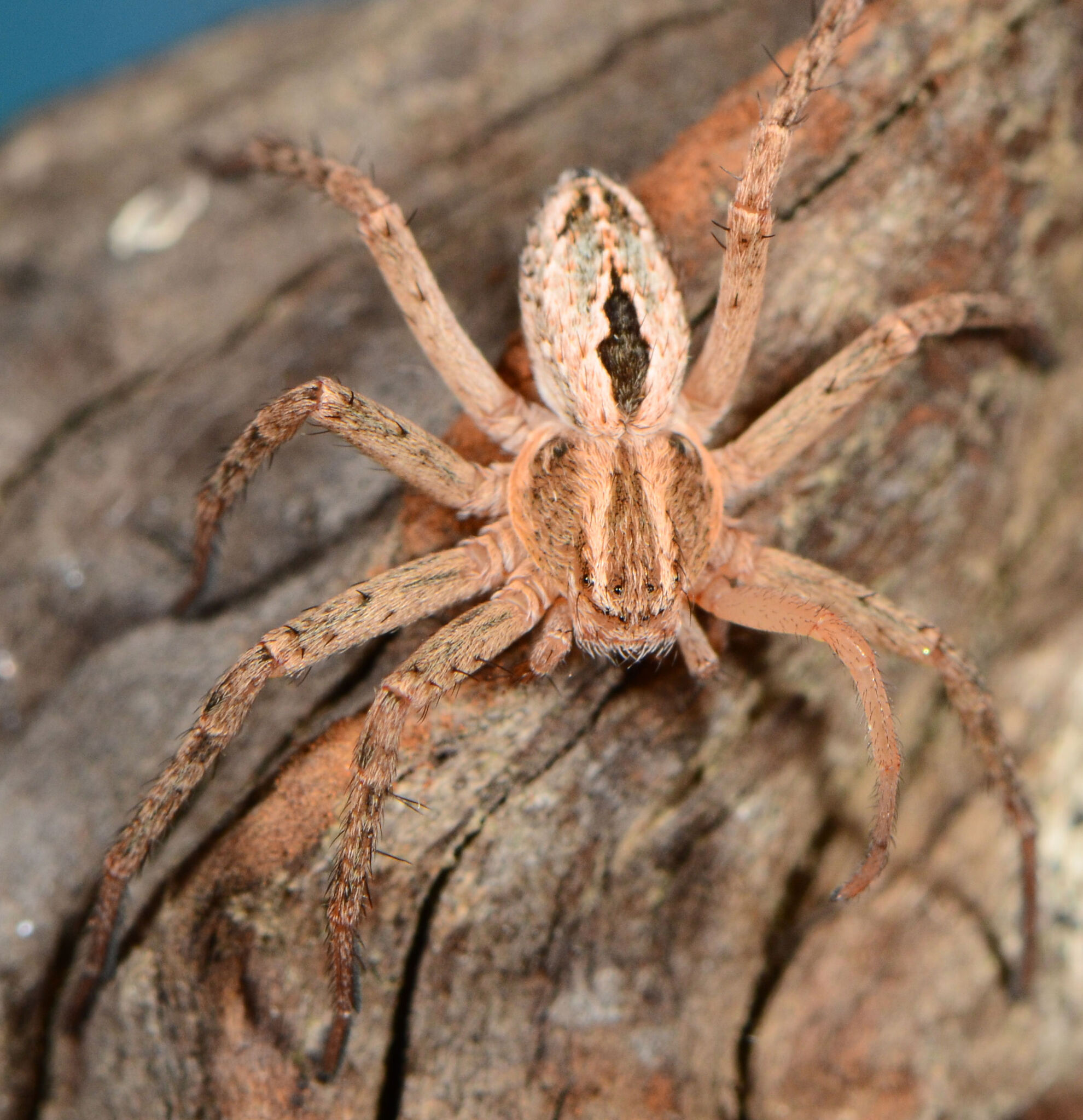

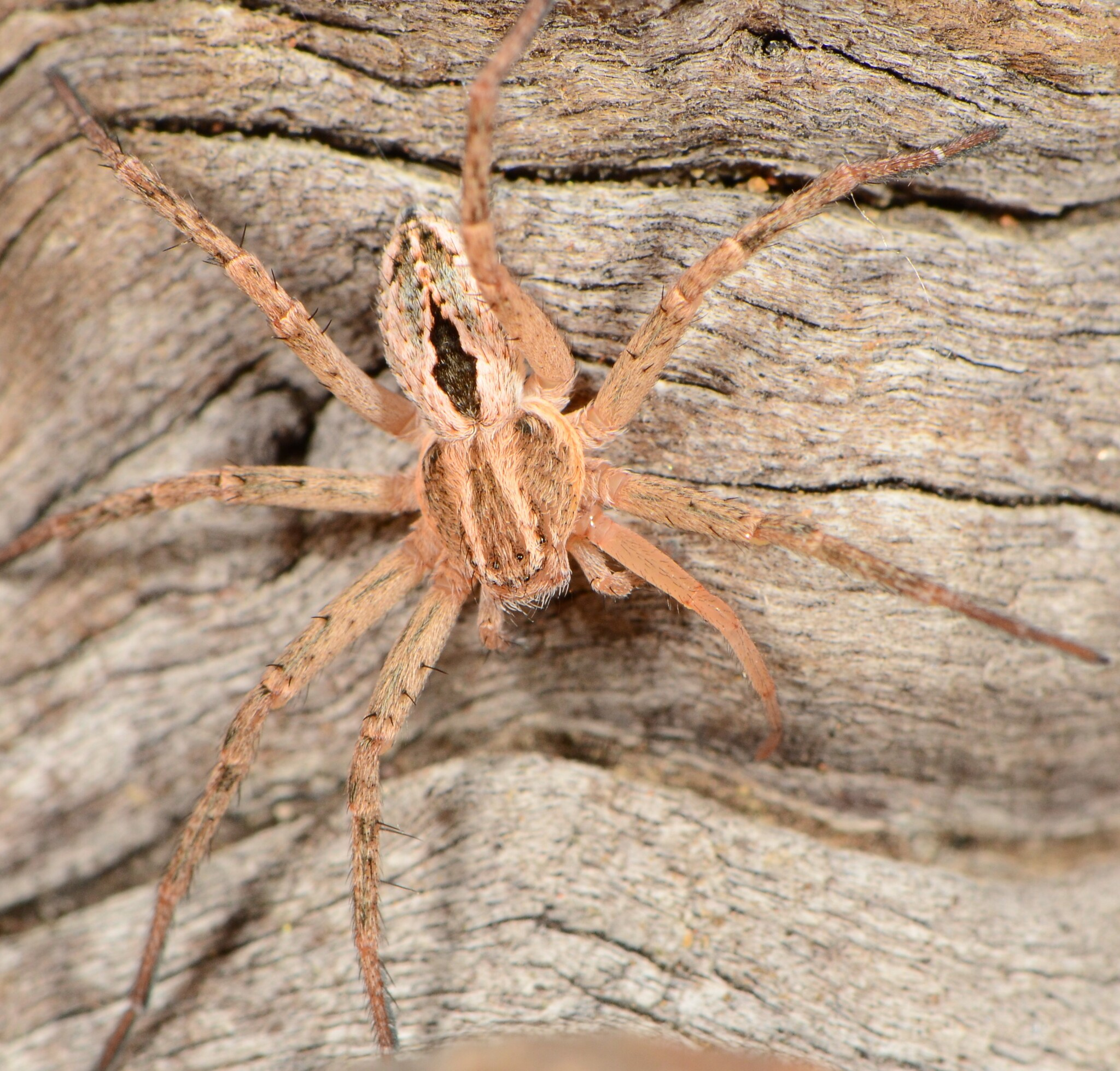

Scientific classification
- Kingdom: Animalia
- Phylum: Arthropoda
- Subphylum: Chelicerata
- Class: Arachnida
- Order: Araneae
- Infraorder: Araneomorphae
- Family: Philodromidae
- Genus: Thanatus
- Species: T. atlanticus

Binomial name
- Thanatus atlanticus Berland, 1936

= Thanatus atlanticus =

Ground Running Spider

Species of spider

Thanatus atlanticus is a species of spider in the family Philodromidae. It is commonly known as the ground running spider.

== Distribution ==
Thanatus atlanticus is known from Cape Verde Islands and South Africa. In South Africa, it was sampled from four provinces including three protected areas, at altitudes of 182-1431 m above sea level.

== Habitat and ecology ==
Thanasus atlanticus was sampled from grass in the Savanna biome.

== Description ==
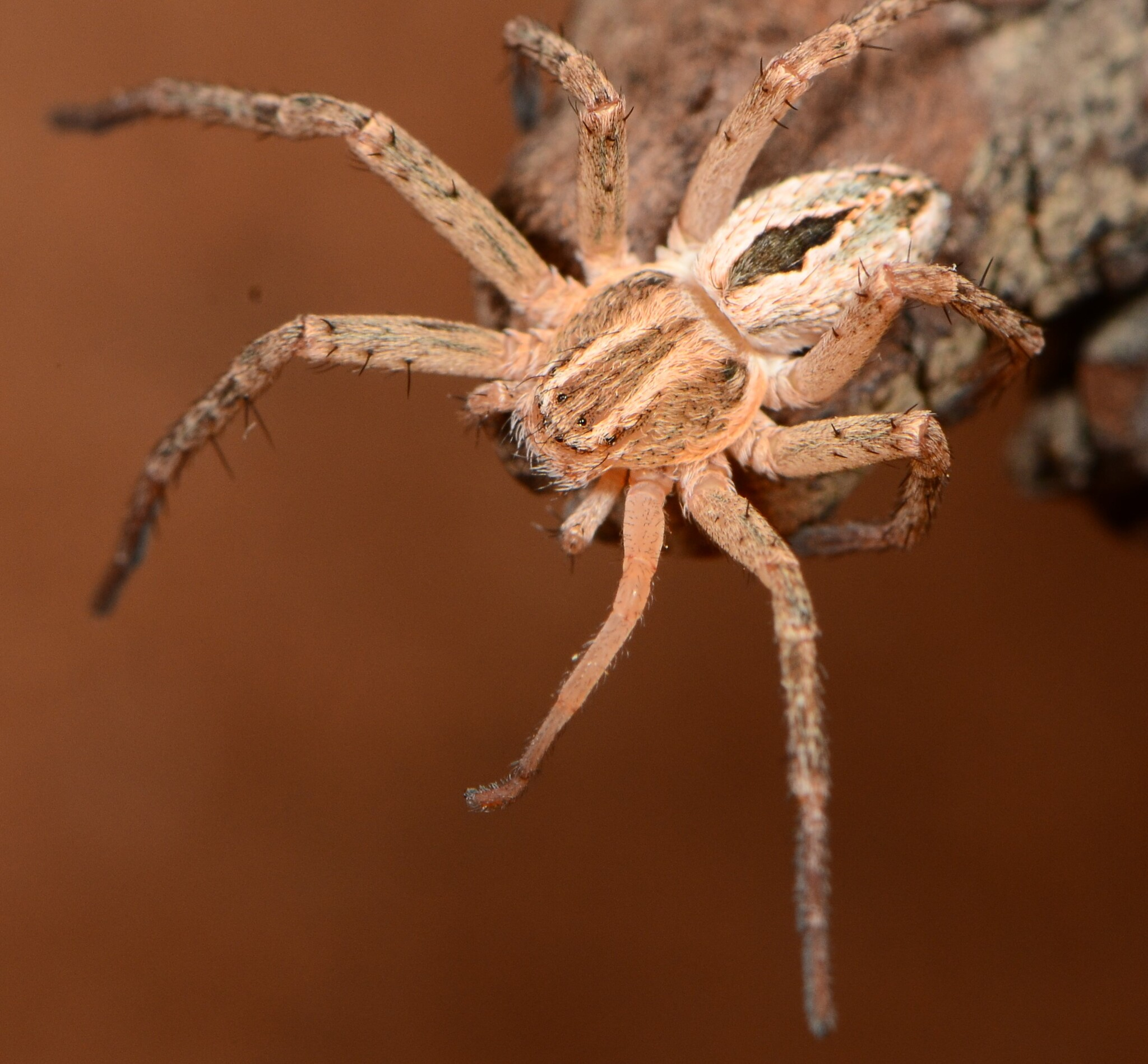
female

== Conservation ==
Thanatus atlanticus is listed as Least Concern by the South African National Biodiversity Institute due to its wide geographical range. The species is protected in three protected areas: Ezemvelo Nature Reserve, Kruger National Park and Namaqua National Park.

== Taxonomy ==
The species was originally described by Lucien Berland (1936) from the Cape Verde Islands. The African species have not been revised and the species is known from both sexes.
