= Thanatus africanus =

African Ground Running Spider

Conservation status
- Least Concern (SANBI Red List)

Scientific classification
- Kingdom: Animalia
- Phylum: Arthropoda
- Subphylum: Chelicerata
- Class: Arachnida
- Order: Araneae
- Infraorder: Araneomorphae
- Family: Philodromidae
- Genus: Thanatus
- Species: T. africanus

Binomial name
- Thanatus africanus Karsch, 1878

Species of spider

Thanatus africanus is a species of spider in the family Philodromidae. It is commonly known as the African ground running spider.

== Distribution ==
Thanatus africanus is known from Tanzania (Zanzibar) and South Africa. In South Africa, it was sampled from Limpopo Province at altitudes of 182-1431 m above sea level.

== Habitat and ecology ==
These are spiders sampled from grass in the Savanna biome.

== Conservation ==
Thanatus africanus is listed as Least Concern by the South African National Biodiversity Institute due to its wide geographical range. The species is protected in the Nylsvley Nature Reserve.

== Taxonomy ==
The species was originally described by Karsch (1878) from Tanzania (Zanzibar). The African species have not been revised and the species is known from both sexes.
