= Soap&Skin =

Austrian musician (born 1990)

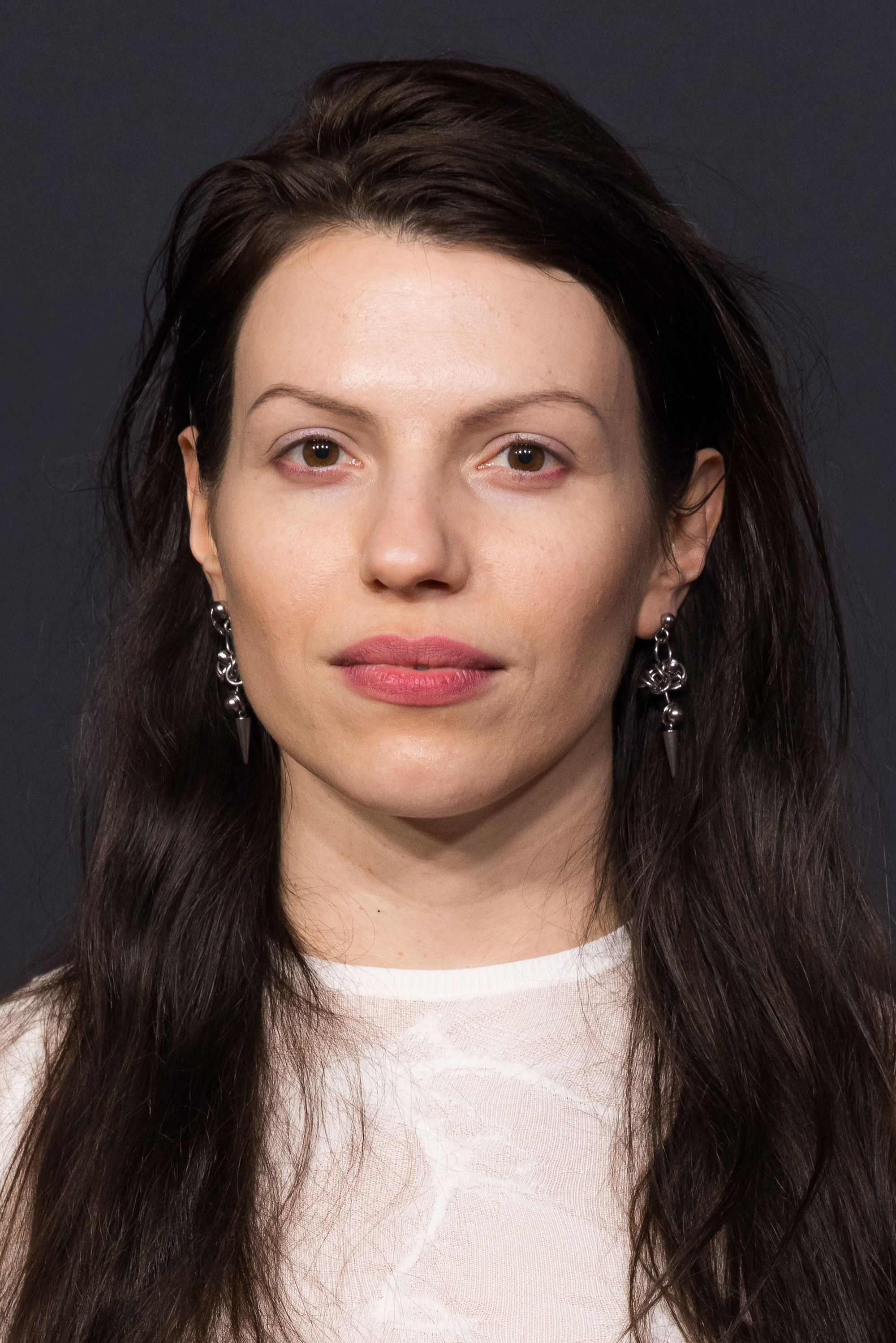
- Anja Plaschg, aka Soap&Skin, in 2024

Background information
- Born: Anja Franziska Plaschg; 5 April 1990 (age 36)
- Origin: Poppendorf, Styria, Austria
- Genres: Experimental; neoclassical dark wave; dark ambient; sadcore; martial industrial
- Years active: 2006–present
- Labels: Couch Records; PIAS; Shitkatapult; SOLFO Music
- Website: Official website

Soap&Skin is the experimental musical project of Austrian artist Anja Plaschg (born 5 April 1990). As of 2025, she has released four studio albums, three EPs, and two original film scores, as well as numerous singles.

== Biography ==
Anja Plaschg grew up in the Austrian village of Katzendorf, near Gnas, in southeast Styria, where her parents had a farm. She started playing the piano at the age of six, and when she was 14, she took up violin studies and developed an interest in electronic music. She studied graphic design at a high school in Graz but dropped out at the age of 16 and moved to Vienna. There, she studied art at the Academy of Fine Arts in the master class of Daniel Richter but dropped out when she was 18. Explaining the stage name Soap&Skin, she has said that "soap and skin are two substances which react on each other in different ways – not only does soap clean skin but it also protects it, and foam is as beautiful as it is vanishing rapidly".

After having played only a handful of concerts, she was already being dubbed a child prodigy. In 2008, she portrayed the German singer Nico in the play "Nico – Sphinx aus Eis", by Werner Fritsch, in Berlin and Vienna, performing several songs in it, including "Janitor of Lunacy", which appeared on her self-titled, debut EP, that same year.

Plaschg's first full-length album, Lovetune for Vacuum, was released in March 2009. It received excellent reviews and earned a spot in the Austrian top ten. It also achieved notable chart positions in Germany, Belgium, and France.

Plaschg's father died in 2009 from a heart attack. During this time, Plaschg stated that she suffered from serious depression, for which she was hospitalized. The death influenced much of her second album, Narrow, which came out in 2012.

In 2010, she won a European Border Breakers Award for her international success.

In 2011, Plaschg debuted as an actress, playing a supporting role in the film Stillleben, which she also scored.

Her third studio album, From Gas to Solid / You Are My Friend, was released in October 2018.

In 2024, she starred in and composed music for the film The Devil's Bath. Later that year, she released her fourth studio album, Torso.

== Song usage ==
Plaschg's 2009 songs "Brother of Sleep" and "Marche Funèbre" were used in the soundtrack for the Universal Pictures thriller War Games: At the End of the Day in 2010. In 2011, she cowrote the song "Goodbye" with Apparat. It was used in the final episode of the fourth season of Breaking Bad and later as the title song of the German Netflix series Dark. Her song "Wonder", from Narrow, was used in the 2019 Belgian film All of Us. "Italy" and "Safe with Me", both from From Gas to Solid / You Are My Friend, are used in the 2017 Italian film Sicilian Ghost Story, and the former also appears in Corsage (2022).

== Discography ==
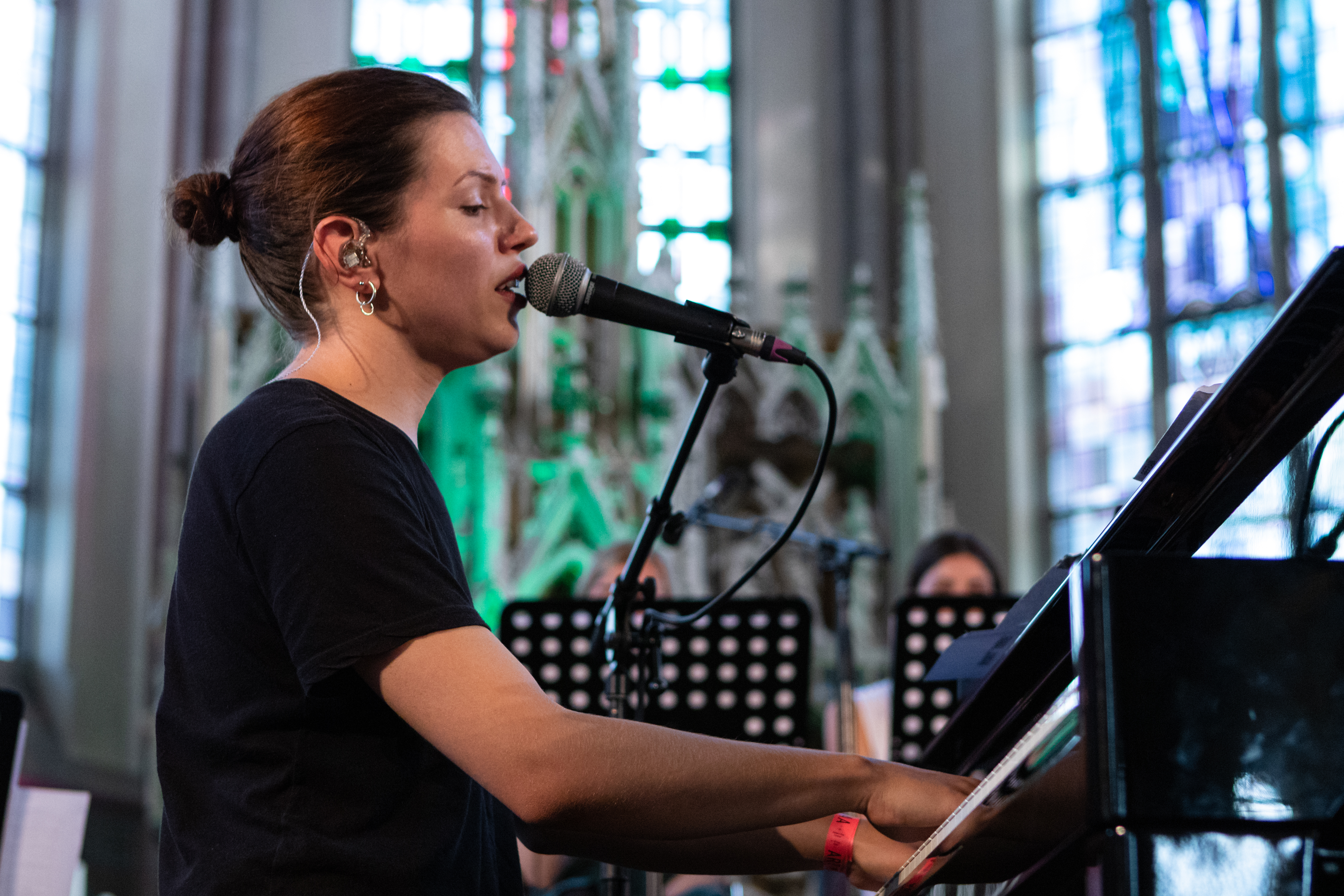
Anja Plaschg at Haldern Pop Festival 2019

Studio albums

- Lovetune for Vacuum (2009)
- Narrow (2012)
- From Gas to Solid / You Are My Friend (2018)
- Torso (2024)

EPs

- Untitled (2008)
- Marche Funèbre (2009)
- Sugarbread (2013)

Singles

- "Spiracle" (2009)
- "Mr. Gaunt PT 1000" (2009)
- "Cynthia" (2009)
- "Voyage Voyage" (2012)
- "Mawal Jamar" (2015)
- "Me and the Devil (Slowed)" (2017)
- "Heal" (2018)
- "Italy" (2018)
- "Surrounded" (2018)
- "Safe with Me (Instrumental)" (2019)
- "Surrounded (Planningtorock Remix)" (2019)
- "Drag Shift" (2019)
- "What's Up?" (2020)
- "Mystery of Love" (2024)
- "Girl Loves Me" (2024)
- "The End" (2024)

Film scores

- Stillleben (2011)
- The Devil's Bath (2024)

== Filmography ==
- Stillleben, as Carmen (2011)
- Die Geträumten, as Ingeborg Bachmann (2016)
- The Devil's Bath, as Agnes (2024)
