= Narrow (album) =

Studio album by Soap&Skin
- Released: 10 February 2012
- Genre: Experimental; neoclassical dark wave; industrial; sadcore
- Length: 28:58
- Label: SOLFO; PIAS
- Producer: Anja Plaschg

Soap&Skin chronology
Marche Funèbre (2009)	Narrow (2012)	Sugarbread (2013)

Professional ratings
Review scores
Source	Rating
NME	(7/10)

Narrow is the second album by Austrian musical project Soap&Skin, released in 2012 on Play It Again Sam Records. It was heavily influenced by the death of her father, stating she wrote the songs after being admitted to a clinic. The cover of the French singer Desireless' synth-pop hit "Voyage, voyage" was used in the movie Stilleben, where Plaschg debuted as an actress.

In 2012 it was awarded a silver certification from the Independent Music Companies Association which indicated sales of at least 20,000 copies throughout Europe.

== Track listing ==
All songs written by Anja Plaschg, except where noted.

1. "Vater" – 5:36
2. "Voyage, voyage" (Dominique Albert Dubois, Jean-Michel Rivat) – 5:18
3. "Deathmental" – 4:45
4. "Cradlesong" – 2:11
5. "Wonder" – 3:14
6. "Lost" – 1:57
7. "Boat Turns Toward the Port" – 3:07
8. "Big Hand Nails Down" – 2:54
9. "Jail" – 0:55 (iTunes bonus track)
