= Relatives Menschsein =

German band

- Origin: Germany
- Genres: Electronic; Gothic; Dark Wave; Neue Deutsche Todeskunst
- Years active: 1991–1999
- Labels: Danse Macabre; Alice In...
- Spinoff of: Das Ich
- Members: Amadeus; Jörg Hüttner; Jörg Wolfgram; Lissy Mödl

Relatives Menschsein is a German darkwave band formed in 1990 by the musicians Amadeus, Lissy Mödl and Jörg Wolfgram. They are one of the first "Neue Deutsche Todeskunst" (New German Death Art) bands. They were signed to label Danse Macabre, founded by the members of Das Ich.

== History ==
Their first singles were a unique blend of music and poetry that became popular in the Darkwave scene. The songs Tempel, Glaube and Verflucht attracted enough attention for the band to get a record deal with Danse Macabre. Their first album, Gefallene Engel, was released in Germany in 1992 on Danse Macabre. The album featured six tracks and was produced by Bruno Kramm.

The band's next album, Die Ewigkeit, was released later in 1993. The album featured two more tracks, guest Thar on guitar and was mixed again by Bruno Kramm. Horst Braun also mixed, produced and recorded the album.

The album Thanatos, released in 2002 on Alice In..., collects the songs from Gefallene Engel and Die Ewigkeit and also features live versions and further tracks.

Their last appearance was in 1999, when they officially disbanded.

== Line-up ==
- Amadeus – Vocals
- Lissy Mödl – Lyrics
- Jörg Hüttner – Music and composition
- Jörg Wolfgram – Guitars

== Discography ==
=== Albums ===
- 1992: Gefallene Engel
- 1993: Die Ewigkeit
- 2002: Thanatos

=== Exclusive tracks appearing on compilations ===
We Came To Dance - Indie Dancefloor Vol. IV – "Die Zeit"
Touched by the Hand of Goth – "Verbotene Triebe"
Künstler Zum 7. Wave-Gotik-Treffen – "Masken"
Wellenreiter In Schwarz Vol. 2 – "Rosa Leidenschaft"
Nachtschwärmer 3 – "Verflucht (Original)"
Extreme Jenseitshymnen 1 - "Ausgeblutet"
Mondenblut 1 – "Passion"
