= Xanatos =

Xanatos may refer to:

- David Xanatos, a character from Gargoyles
- Xanatos, a character from the Star Wars: Jedi Apprentice books

== See also ==
- Thanatos, the Greek god of death
