= Poppendorf, Styria =

Poppendorf
- Former municipality
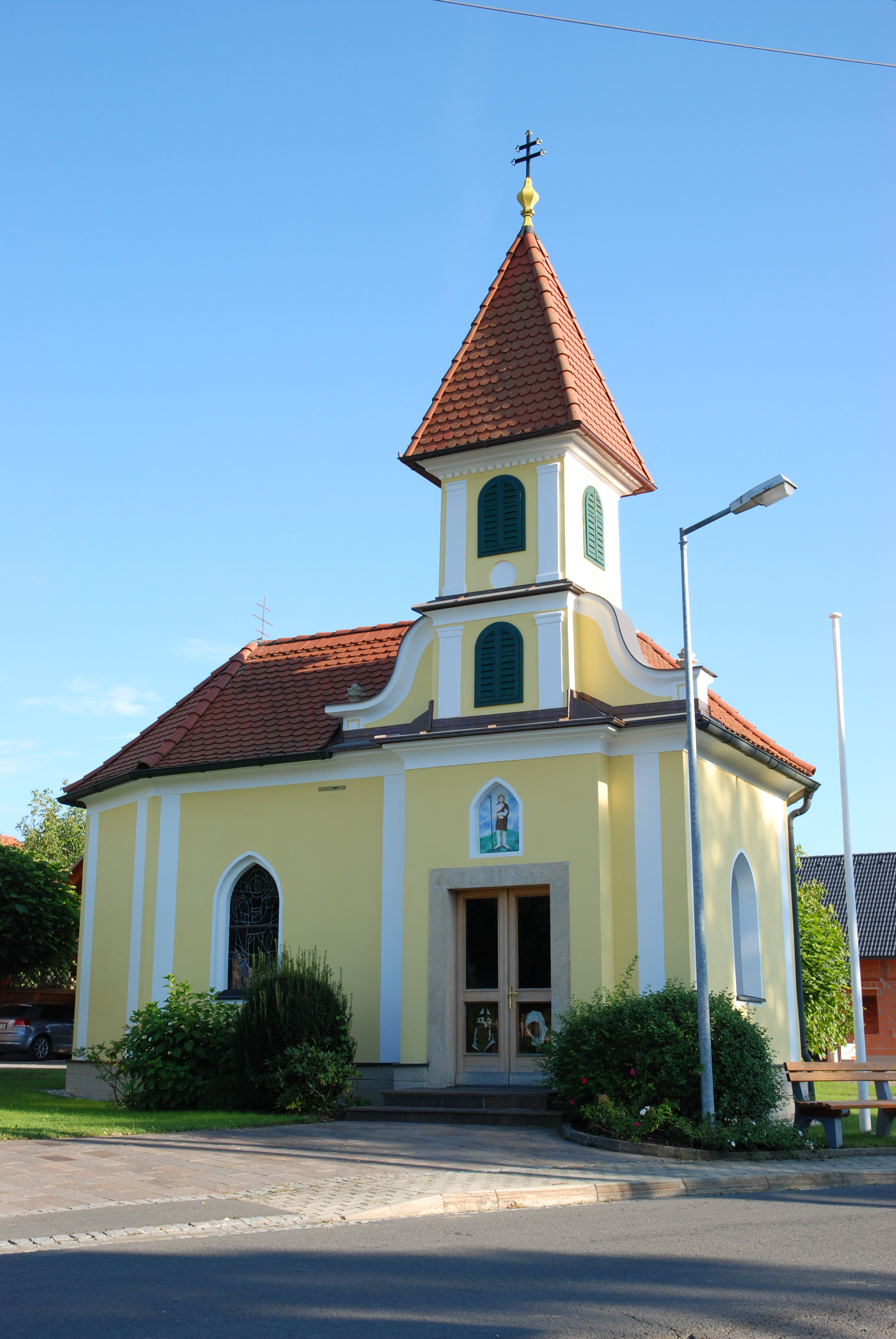
- Chapel in Poppendorf

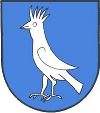
- Coat of arms

- Location within Austria
- Coordinates: 46°52′00″N 15°51′00″E
- Country: Austria
- State: Styria
- District: Südoststeiermark

Area
  - Total: 11.22 km^{2} (4.33 sq mi)
- Elevation: 324 m (1,063 ft)

Population (1 January 2016)
  - Total: 694
  - Density: 61.9/km^{2} (160/sq mi)
- Time zone: UTC+1 (CET)
  - Summer (DST): UTC+2 (CEST)
- Postal code: 8342, 8343
- Area code: +43 3151
- Vehicle registration: FB
- Website: www.poppendorf.at

Poppendorf is a former municipality in the district of Südoststeiermark in the Austrian state of Styria. Since the 2015 Styria municipal structural reform, it is part of the municipality Gnas.

== Population ==
Historical population
Year	Pop.	±%
1869	884	—
1880	910	+2.9%
1890	869	−4.5%
1900	803	−7.6%
1910	781	−2.7%
1923	799	+2.3%
1934	803	+0.5%
1939	774	−3.6%
1951	744	−3.9%
1961	755	+1.5%
1971	781	+3.4%
1981	773	−1.0%
1991	747	−3.4%
2001	700	−6.3%
2013	687	−1.9%
