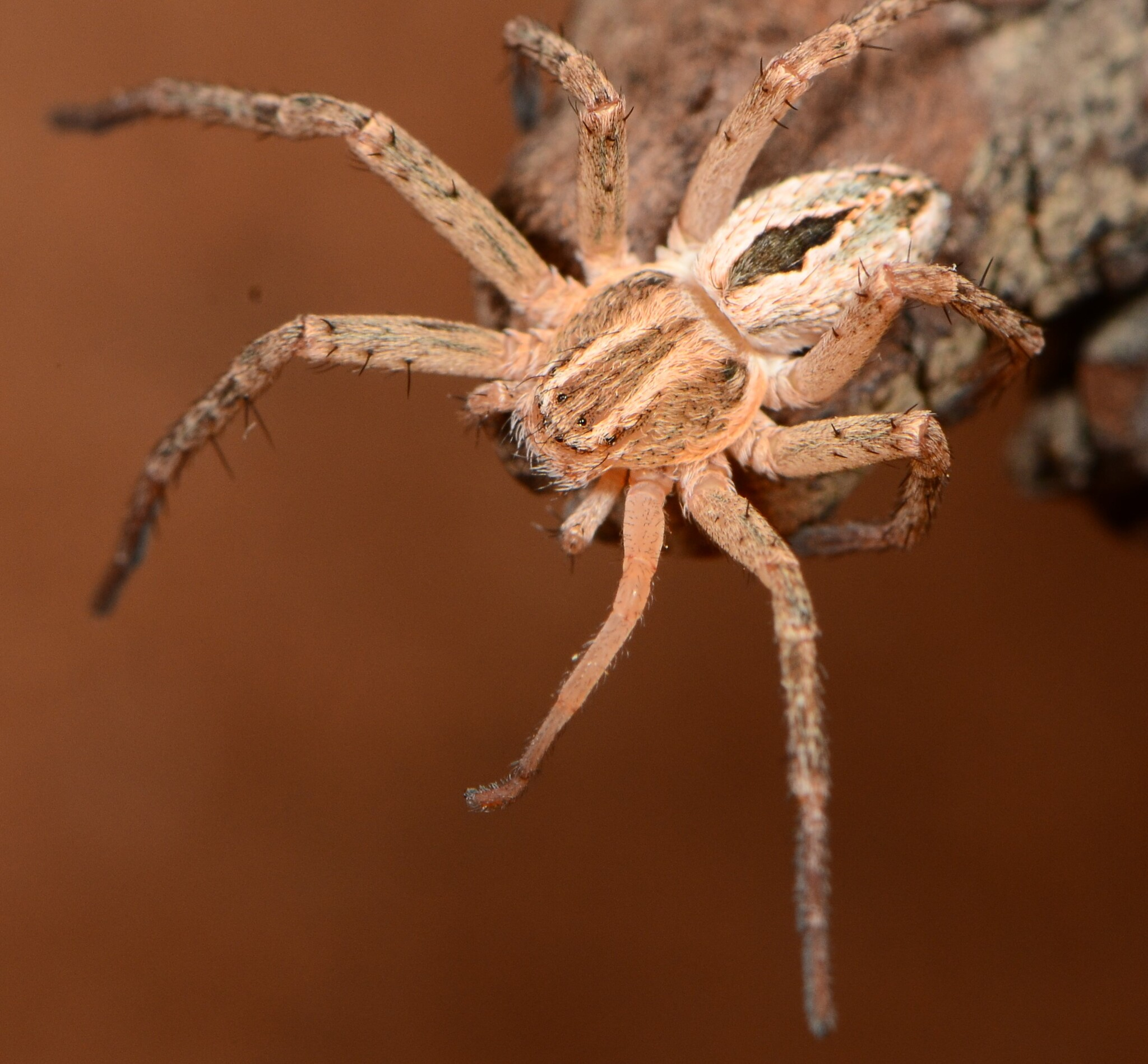
- female T. atlanticus
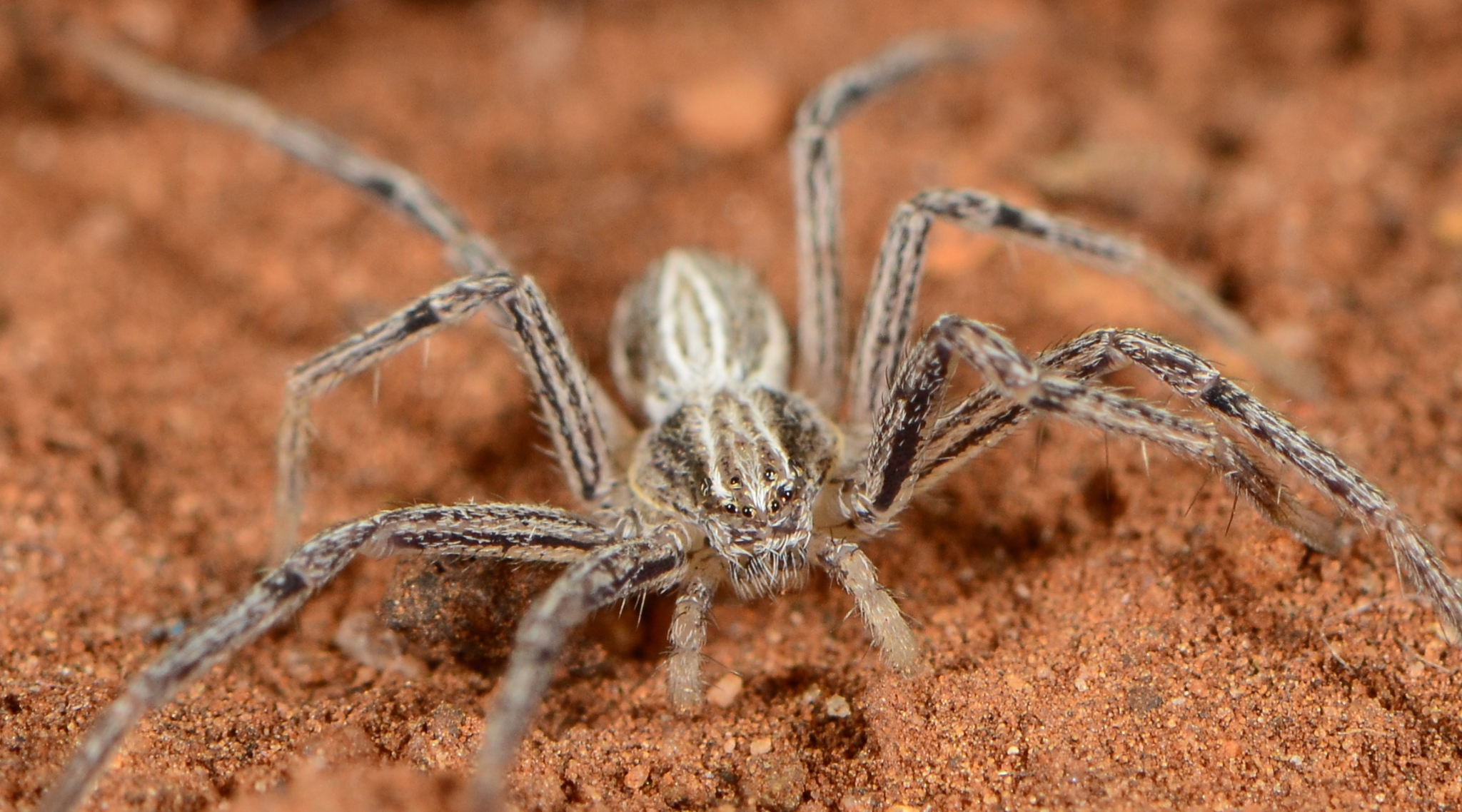
- female T. dorsilineatus

Scientific classification
- Kingdom: Animalia
- Phylum: Arthropoda
- Subphylum: Chelicerata
- Class: Arachnida
- Order: Araneae
- Infraorder: Araneomorphae
- Family: Philodromidae
- Genus: Thanatus; C. L. Koch, 1837

= Thanatus =

Genus of spiders

Thanatus is a genus of false crab spiders described by Carl Ludwig Koch in 1837, belonging to the order Araneae, family Philodromidae.

Species of this genus are present in most of Europe.

Adult members of this genus of spiders can reach 5–6 millimetres (0.20–0.24 in) in length and can mostly be encountered above the soil surface (epigeal organism) on low vegetation.

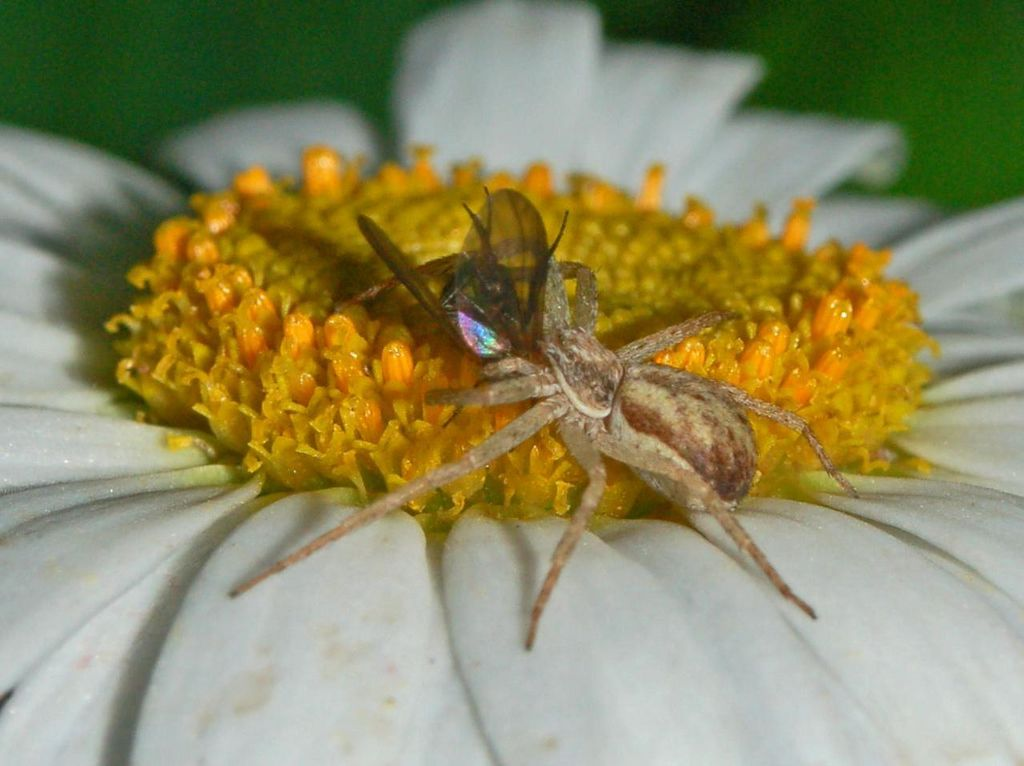
Thanatus sp. with prey

The members of this genus have a clear leaf-like cardiac mark on the anterior dorsal elongated abdomen. They are very similar to Philodromus species, but they can mainly be distinguished by differences in the eyes.

== Species ==
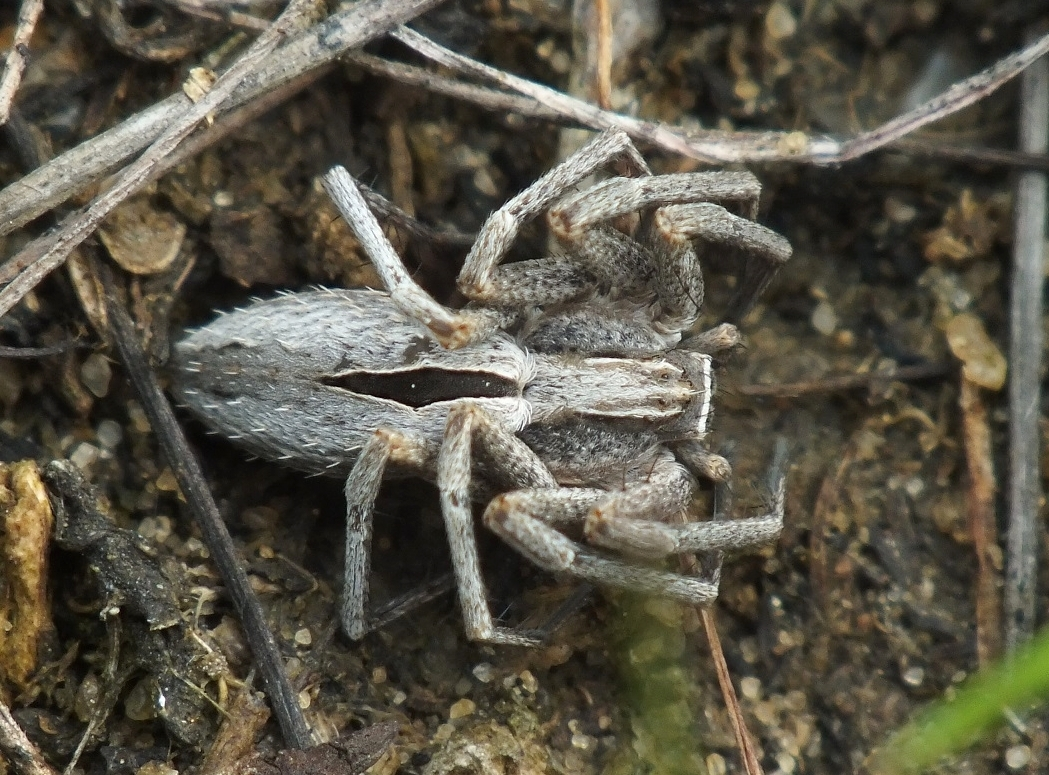
T. arenarius

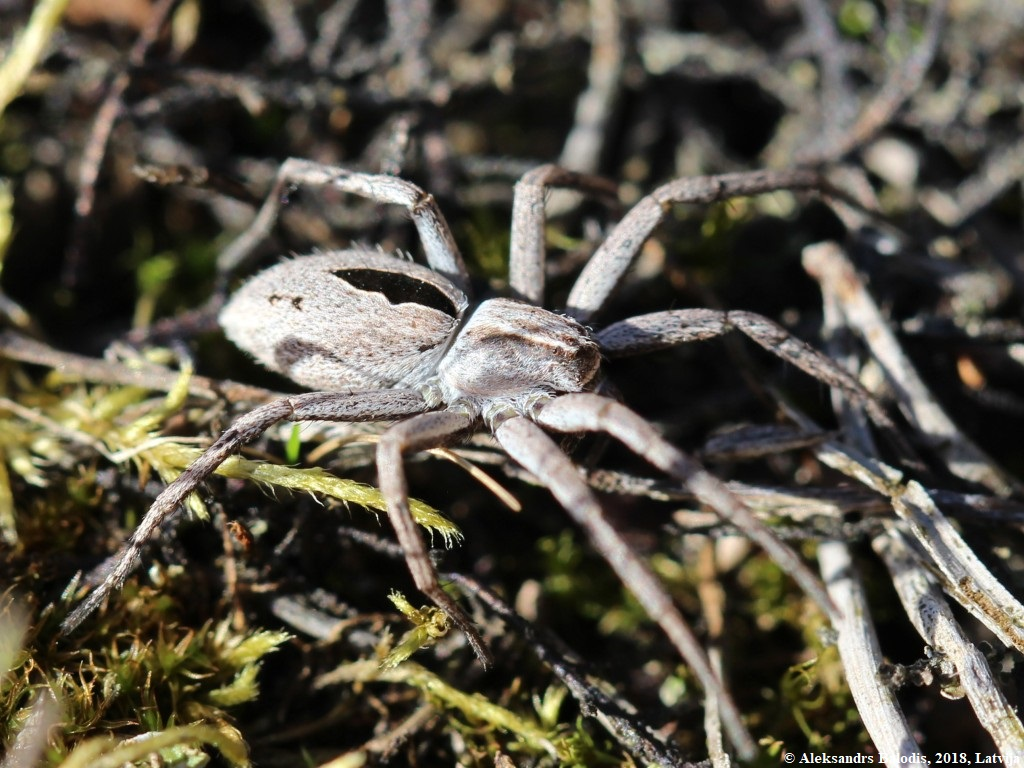
T. formicinus

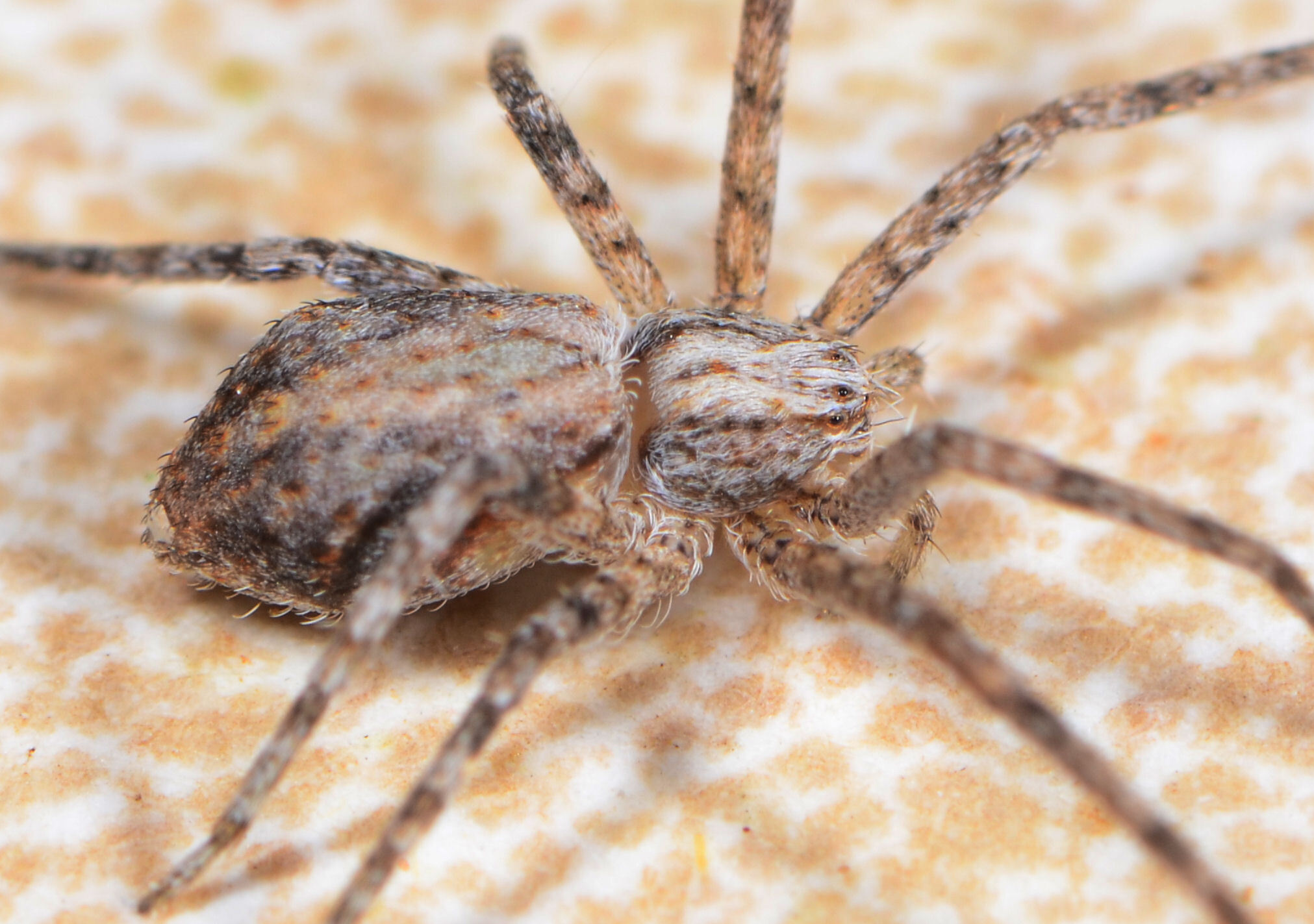
female T. lamottei

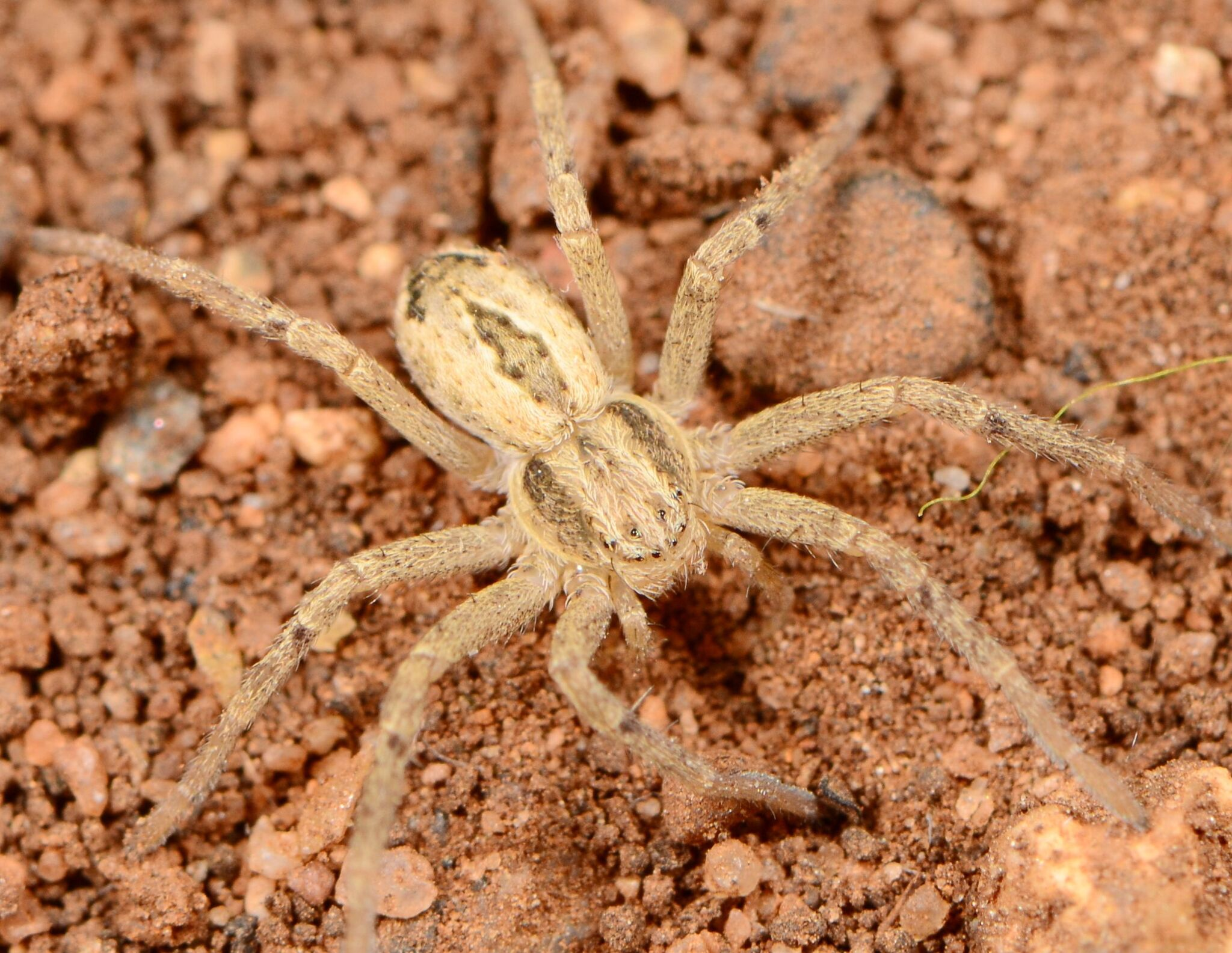
female T. vulgaris

As of September 2025, this genus includes 96 species:

- Thanatus africanus Karsch, 1878 – Tanzania, South Africa
- Thanatus albescens O. Pickard-Cambridge, 1885 – Pakistan or India
- Thanatus altimontis Gertsch, 1933 – Canada, United States, Mexico
- Thanatus arcticus Thorell, 1872 – Alaska, Canada, Greenland, Northern Europe, Russia, Kazakhstan, China, Korea, Japan
- Thanatus arenarius L. Koch, 1872 – Europe, Caucasus, Iran, Russia, Kazakhstan
- Thanatus arenicola (Schmidt, 1976) – Canary Islands
- Thanatus atlanticus Berland, 1936 – Cape Verde, South Africa
- Thanatus atratus Simon, 1875 – Europe, Turkey, Caucasus, Russia, Kazakhstan, Iran, Korea, Japan
- Thanatus balestrerii Caporiacco, 1935 – India
- Thanatus bungei (Kulczyński, 1908) – Russia, Japan, North America
- Thanatus chorillensis Keyserling, 1880 – Peru
- Thanatus coloradensis Keyserling, 1880 – North America, Europe, Turkey, Russia, Kazakhstan, China
- Thanatus coreanus Paik, 1979 – Russia (South Siberia, Far East), Korea, China
- Thanatus cronebergi Simon, 1895 – Mongolia
- Thanatus dahurianus Logunov, 1997 – Russia
- Thanatus damingus Wang, Zhang & Xing, 2013 – China
- Thanatus denisi Brignoli, 1983 – Afghanistan
- Thanatus dhakuricus Tikader, 1960 – India
- Thanatus dissimilis Denis, 1960 – France
- Thanatus dorsilineatus Jézéquel, 1964 – Ivory Coast, Botswana, South Africa
- Thanatus elongatus (Tikader, 1960) – India
- Thanatus fabricii (Audouin, 1826) – Canary Islands, Northern Africa, South Africa, Portugal, Spain, Greece, Turkey, Caucasus, Middle East, Iran, Kazakhstan, Central Asia
- Thanatus firmetorum Muster & Thaler, 2003 – Switzerland, Germany, Austria, Italy
- Thanatus flavidus Simon, 1875 – Greece, Ukraine, Russia
- Thanatus flavus O. Pickard-Cambridge, 1876 – Egypt
- Thanatus forbesi Pocock, 1903 – Yemen
- Thanatus forciformis Li, Feng & Yang, 2013 – China
- Thanatus formicinus (Clerck, 1757) – North America, Europe, North Africa, Turkey, Caucasus, Russia, Iraq, Iran, Kazakhstan, Central Asia, China, Japan
- Thanatus fornicatus Simon, 1897 – Egypt to Pakistan
- Thanatus frederici Denis, 1941 – Cape Verde Islands
- Thanatus fuscipes Denis, 1937 – Algeria
- Thanatus fuscipes Denis, 1957 – Spain
- Thanatus gnaquiensis Strand, 1908 – Peru
- Thanatus hongkong Song, Zhu & Wu, 1997 – China
- Thanatus imbecillus L. Koch, 1878 – Greece, North Macedonia, Bulgaria, Ukraine, Caucasus, Russia, Urals), Iran, Central Asia
- Thanatus inconsuetus Caporiacco, 1940 – Ethiopia
- Thanatus indicus Simon, 1885 – India
- Thanatus jabalpurensis Gajbe & Gajbe, 1999 – India
- Thanatus jaikensis Ponomarev, 2007 – Kazakhstan
- Thanatus ketani Bhandari & Gajbe, 2001 – India
- Thanatus kitabensis Charitonov, 1946 – Azerbaijan, Russia, Iran, Kazakhstan, Central Asia
- Thanatus lamottei Jézéquel, 1964 – Ivory Coast, South Africa
- Thanatus lanatus Logunov, 1996 – Russia
- Thanatus lanceolatus Simon, 1875 – Ukraine
- Thanatus lanceoletus Tikader, 1966 – India
- Thanatus lesserti (Roewer, 1951) – Turkey, Egypt to Iran
- Thanatus lineatipes Simon, 1870 – Mediterranean, Georgia
- Thanatus luederitzi Simon, 1910 – Namibia
- Thanatus maculatus Keyserling, 1880 – Peru
- Thanatus mandali Tikader, 1965 – India
- Thanatus meronensis Levy, 1977 – Bulgaria, Israel
- Thanatus mikhailovi Logunov, 1996 – Russia, Kazakhstan, Central Asia
- Thanatus miniaceus Simon, 1880 – Mongolia, China, Taiwan, Korea, Japan
- Thanatus mongolicus (Schenkel, 1936) – Ukraine, Russia, Kazakhstan, Mongolia, China
- Thanatus mus Strand, 1908 – Peru
- Thanatus namaquensis Simon, 1910 – South Africa
- Thanatus neimongol Urita & Song, 1987 – China
- Thanatus nentwigi Wunderlich, 2017 – Nigeria
- Thanatus nipponicus Yaginuma, 1969 – Russia, Mongolia, China, Korea, Japan
- Thanatus nodongensis Kim & Kim, 2012 – Korea
- Thanatus oblongiusculus (Lucas, 1846) – Southern Europe, North Africa, Turkey, Ukraine, Russia to Central Asia, Iran, China
- Thanatus oblongiusculus (Simon, 1932) – France
- Thanatus okayi Karol, 1966 – Turkey
- Thanatus ornatus (Lucas, 1846) – Algeria
- Thanatus pagenstecheri Strand, 1906 – Namibia
- Thanatus parangvulgaris Barrion & Litsinger, 1995 – Thailand
- Thanatus philodromicus Strand, 1916 – Madagascar
- Thanatus philodromoides Caporiacco, 1940 – Somalia
- Thanatus pictus L. Koch, 1881 – Europe, Turkey, Caucasus, Russia, Kazakhstan, Iran
- Thanatus pinnatus Jézéquel, 1964 – Ivory Coast
- Thanatus plumosus Simon, 1890 – Yemen
- Thanatus pollex Li, Feng & Yang, 2013 – China
- Thanatus prolixus Simon, 1897 – India
- Thanatus pygmaeus Schmidt & Krause, 1996 – Canary Islands
- Thanatus rayi Simon, 1875 – Europe to Kazakhstan
- Thanatus roseofemoralis (Karsch, 1879) – Japan
- Thanatus rubicellus Mello-Leitão, 1929 – Canada, United States
- Thanatus rubicundus L. Koch, 1875 – Ethiopia, Somalia, East Africa
- Thanatus sabulosus (Menge, 1875) – Europe, Turkey, Caucasus, Russia, Kazakhstan, China
- Thanatus saraevi Ponomarev, 2007 – Kazakhstan, Iran, Pakistan, Uzbekistan
- Thanatus schubotzi Strand, 1913 – Central Africa
- Thanatus sepiacolor Levy, 1999 – Israel, United Arab Emirates, Iran
- Thanatus setiger (O. Pickard-Cambridge, 1872) – Morocco, Libya, Israel, United Arab Emirates, Iran
- Thanatus simplicipalpis Simon, 1882 – Yemen, India
- Thanatus stepposus Logunov, 1996 – Russia, China
- Thanatus striatus C. L. Koch, 1845 – North America, Europe, Turkey, Russia, Kazakhstan, Central Asia
- Thanatus stripatus Tikader, 1980 – India
- Thanatus tuvinensis Logunov, 1996 – Russia, Kyrgyzstan
- Thanatus ubsunurensis Logunov, 1996 – Russia (South Siberia)
- Thanatus validus Simon, 1875 – Algeria
- Thanatus virgulatipes Wunderlich, 2023 – Portugal
- Thanatus vulgaris Simon, 1870 – Europe, North Africa, Turkey, Caucasus, Russia, Middle East, Iran, Kazakhstan, Central Asia, China, Korea, Japan. Introduced to North America, South Africa, Australia
- Thanatus vulgaris Kulczyński, 1903 – Greece
- Thanatus wuchuanensis Tang & Wang, 2008 – Russia, China
- Thanatus xinjiangensis Hu & Wu, 1989 – China
- Thanatus zavattarii Caporiacco, 1939 – Ethiopia
