= Thanatos (Relatives Menschsein album) =

Studio album by Relatives Menschsein
- Released: (Germany) July 15, 2002
- Genres: electronic music Gothic; Darkwave
- Label: Alice In... (Germany)
- Producer: Relatives Menschsein

Relatives Menschsein chronology
Die Ewigkeit (1993)	Thanatos (2002)

Thanatos is an album of Relatives Menschsein collecting their output. It contains their previous albums Gefallene Engel and Die Ewigkeit.

== Track listing ==
Disc 1:

1. "Prolog"–2:34
2. "Glaube"–6:22
3. "Gefallene Engel"–5:59
4. "Androiden"–5:39
5. "Epilog"–2:21
6. "Der Tod"–4:52
7. "Verbotene Triebe"–2:48
8. "Der Clown (Demo)"–2:06
9. "Lebewohl Domenique (Live)"–3:52
10. "Nur Gedacht (Live)"–3:11
11. "Sprossen zum Wahn (Live)"-4:31
12. "Die Ewigkeit (Live)"-6:21
13. "Prolog (Live)"-3:22

Disc 2:

1. "Verflucht"-3:36
2. "Ausgeblutet"-4:31
3. "In Gedanken"-2:32
4. "Erfüllung"-4:54
5. "Leben"-3:36
6. "Passion"-4:25
7. "Verflucht"-7:02
8. "Die Ewigkeit"-6:18
9. "Tempel (Remastered)"-3:04
10. "Die Zeit"-4:52
11. "Masken"-4:16
12. "Rosa Leidenschaft"-5:58

== Info ==
- All tracks written by Lissy Mödl
- Vocals by Amadeus (Wolfgang A. Mödl)
- Guitars by Thar, Andy Age
- Keys by Jörg „Jogy“ Wolfgram, Jörg Hüttner
