= Lovetune for Vacuum =

Studio album by Soap&Skin
- Released: 13 April 2009
- Genre: Experimental; neoclassical dark wave; electronica; dark ambient
- Length: 41:39
- Label: Couch; PIAS
- Producer: Anja Plaschg

Soap&Skin chronology
| Untitled (2008) | Lovetune for Vacuum (2009) | Marche Funèbre (2009) |

Professional ratings
Review scores
| Source | Rating |
|---|---|
| AllMusic | (Favourable) |
| Clash | (Positive) |
| NME | (8/10) |
| Pitchfork | (7.3/10) |
| Sputnikmusic | 4.5/5 stars |
| State | 6/10 stars |
| SoundsXP | (Positive) |

Lovetune for Vacuum is the debut album by Austrian musical project Soap&Skin, released in 2009 on PIAS Recordings. It is listed as #38 on musicOMH's Top 50 Albums of 2009.

In 2012 it was awarded a silver certification from the Independent Music Companies Association, which indicates sales of at least 20,000 copies throughout Europe.

== Track listing ==
1. "Sleep" – 2:44
2. "Cry Wolf" – 3:48
3. "Thanatos" – 2:34
4. "Im Dorfe" – 3:42 †
5. "Extinguish Me" – 2:38
6. "Turbine Womb" – 3:46
7. "Cynthia" – 2:57
8. "Fall Foliage" – 2:44
9. "Spiracle" – 2:50
10. "Mr. Gaunt Pt 1000" – 2:27
11. "Marche Funèbre" – 2:59
12. "The Sun" – 3:14
13. "Fleischwolf" – 2:15 †
14. "DDMMYYYY" – 3:38
15. "Brother of Sleep" – 5:25

† indicates a track exclusive to the American edition of the album.
