= Rockets discography =

Discography of French space rock band, Rockets.

== Albums ==
=== Studio albums ===
- Rockets (1976)
- On the Road Again (1978)
- Sound of the Future (1979)
- Plasteroïd (1979)
- Galaxy (1980)
- π 3,14 (1981)
- Atomic (1982)
- Imperception (1984)
- One Way (1986)
- Another Future (1992)
- Don't Stop (2003)
- Kaos (2014)
- Wonderland (2019)
- Alienation (2021)
- Time Machine (2023)

=== Live albums ===
- Live (1980)

=== Compilation albums ===
- Galactica (1982)
- Greatest Hits (1996)
- Hits & Remixes (1996)
- The Definitive Collection (2000)
- Original Greatest Hits (2003)
- Rocket Fuel (2005)
- The Silver Years (7 albums, digitally remastered) (2007)
- A Long Journey (2009)

== Singles ==
- "Rocket Man"
- "Future Woman"
- "Samurai"
- "Space Rock"
- "Fils du Ciel"
- "On the Road Again"
- "Electric Delight"
- "Astral World"
- "Galactica"
- "Synthetic Man"
- "Ideomatic"
- "Radiate"
- "Radio Station"
- "Under the Sun"
- "Don't Give Up"
