= 30-hole and Fred Perry =

Studio album by Digitalis Purpurea
- Released: April 24, 2012
- Genre: Electro Industrial
- Label: Danse Macabre Records, Danse Macabre Records
- Producer: Cristian Pi Greco

30-hole and Fred Perry released through "Danse Macabre Records" is the third album of the Italian Electro Industrial one-man project Digitalis Purpurea. It was released on 24 April 2012 with a worldwide distribution.

== Themes and lyrics ==
“30-hole and Fred Perry" is the third chapter of DIGITALIS PURPUREA's "cinematic trilogy". The two previous excerpts are the full-length albums Aseptic White and Emotional Decompression Chamber. The controversial content of the record is irreverent, ugly and provocative. "Bubblegum-Pop" artworks, explicit sexuality and the ostensible superficiality of lyrics and contents are intentionally flaunted with satire and irony. Although maintaining the cinematic feature of the previous works now atmospheres tune into a less noble mood. To frame these intentions the artwork is inspired by Terry Richardson crude pictures and Barbara Kruger subversive slogans. The texts are influenced by Charles Bukowski and the following quote could be the album’ slogan: "Hospitals and jails and whores; these are the universities of life. I´ve got several degrees. Call me Mr." The title track "30-hole and Fred Perry" is the first single extracted that will lead the promotional propaganda. The track has been produced in collaboration with the famous American sound-tech Ted Jensen.

== Commercial performance ==
The album entered the Top 10 of DAC – Deutsche Alternative Charts and it has been a "bullet" in the single-category in 2012.

== Artwork ==
The artwork sees again the collaboration with the graphic artist and photographer Anna Taschini. The theme is sexually explicit and uses contemporary pop music stylistic with irony.

== Track listing ==
All songs written by Cristian Pi Greco.

1. "30-hole and Fred Perry" – 2:51
2. "Pussy is prêt-à-porter, girls' ass is for élites" – 1:50
3. "The sky is the biggest cunt of them all" – 3:21
4. "I don't give a fuck ye-yea-YEAH!" – 3:10
5. "Even if all, no I don't" – 5:00
6. "When Perry Cum [Remix]" – 5:39

== Personnel ==
Digitalis Purpurea

- Cristian Pi Greco – Vocals, Synthesizer, Drum machine, songwriter, Producer
- Luke K – guitar, bass guitar

Production

- Cristian Pi Greco – Mix and Mastering
- Ted Jensen – Mastering engineer of "30-hole and Fred Perry" title-track
- Anna Lucylle Taschini – Graphic Design, cover photography
- Medea – Cover model
