= A Ghost at Noon =

A Ghost at Noon may refer to:

- Contempt, by Alberto Moravia
- Contempt (film), based on the book
