= Bernard Torelli =

Bernard Torelli (13 October 1955 – 18 January 2016) was a French guitarist, composer, audio engineer and record producer.

== Life and career ==
He was born in Nice, the younger half-brother of musician and record producer Jean-Pierre Massiera. When Massiera established a new 16-track recording studio in Antibes, Torelli began recording with him as guitarist, playing on the 1974 concept album Visitors. Torelli joined the band Rockets in 1976, and featured on their debut album.

The following year, he played on another album coordinated by Massiera, Atlantide, and then on the cult psychedelic album L'Etrange Mr. Whinster, credited to Horrific Child. Torelli worked with the prolific Massiera as musician, composer, arranger and occasionally co-producer, on numerous prog rock and space disco albums and projects during the late 1970s. These included the albums Turn Radio On, Phantasmes, Space Woman (credited to the act Herman's Rocket), Galactic Soul (credited to Venus Gang), and singer Jessy Joyce's J. Joyce & Co., among others. On the 1978 prog rock album Human Egg, Torelli played guitar, bass and keyboards. In the 1970s, Torelli also worked as a session musician in Paris, with Manu Dibango among others.

In the early 1980s, Torelli moved to California. After he was introduced to French singer Michel Polnareff, he worked with him as his guitarist and engineer. He also worked with Stanley Clarke, the jazz fusion band CAB, and others. He later worked as a recording engineer at Track Star Studios in San Diego. Around 2000, he founded the software company Nomad Factory, responsible for creating programs and software for audio recording, mixing and mastering. This included developing audio software processors and plug-ins for DAWs (digital audio workstation) such as Cubase and Pro Tools.

In 2016, Torelli died as a result of cancer, aged 60.
