= Tying Tiffany =

Italian electronic music project

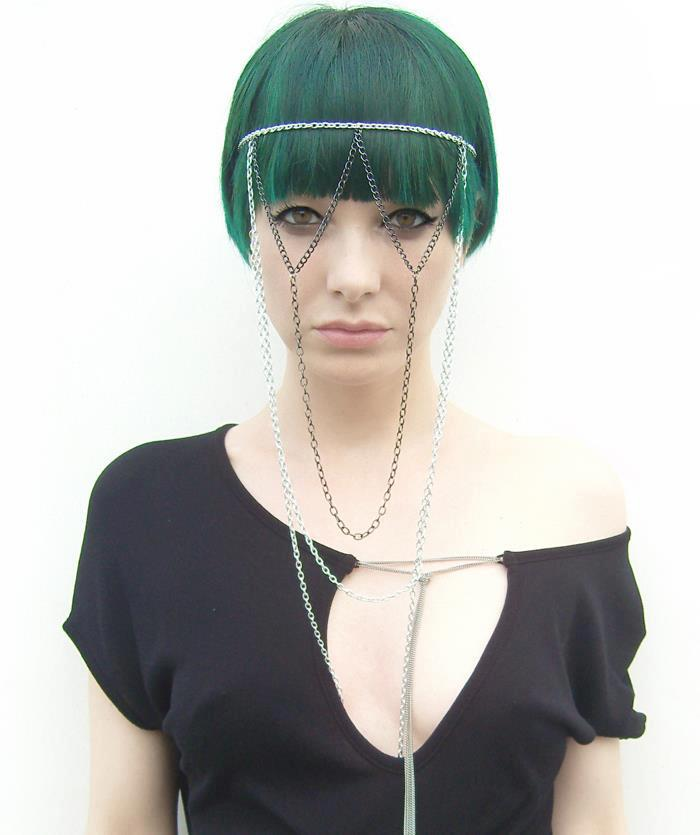
- Tying Tiffany in August 2022

Background information
- Also known as: TT; Tiff Lion
- Genres: Electropunk; electroclash; electronic; alternative rock; goth rock
- Occupations: Singer; songwriter
- Years active: 2004–present
- Labels: Jato; Get Physical; Ocean Dark; I Scream; Trisol; Zerokilled; Mecanica
- Website: tyingtiffany.com

Tying Tiffany, also known as TT and Tiff Lion, is an Italian electronic music project. The idea of the stage name was born from a photobook by artist Nobuyoshi Araki.

Tying Tiffany has released five original studio albums: Undercover (2005), Brain for Breakfast (2007), Peoples Temple (2010), Dark Days, White Nights (2012), Drop (2014). TT has also released two remix albums, Black Neon RMXs (2009) and Peoples Temple Remix Edition (2011), plus the EP One (2013), as well as over fifteen singles.

In 2011, TT started an instrumental music side project, T.T.L., with Italian producer Lorenzo Montanà, creating soundtracks for films and trailers.

== Biography ==
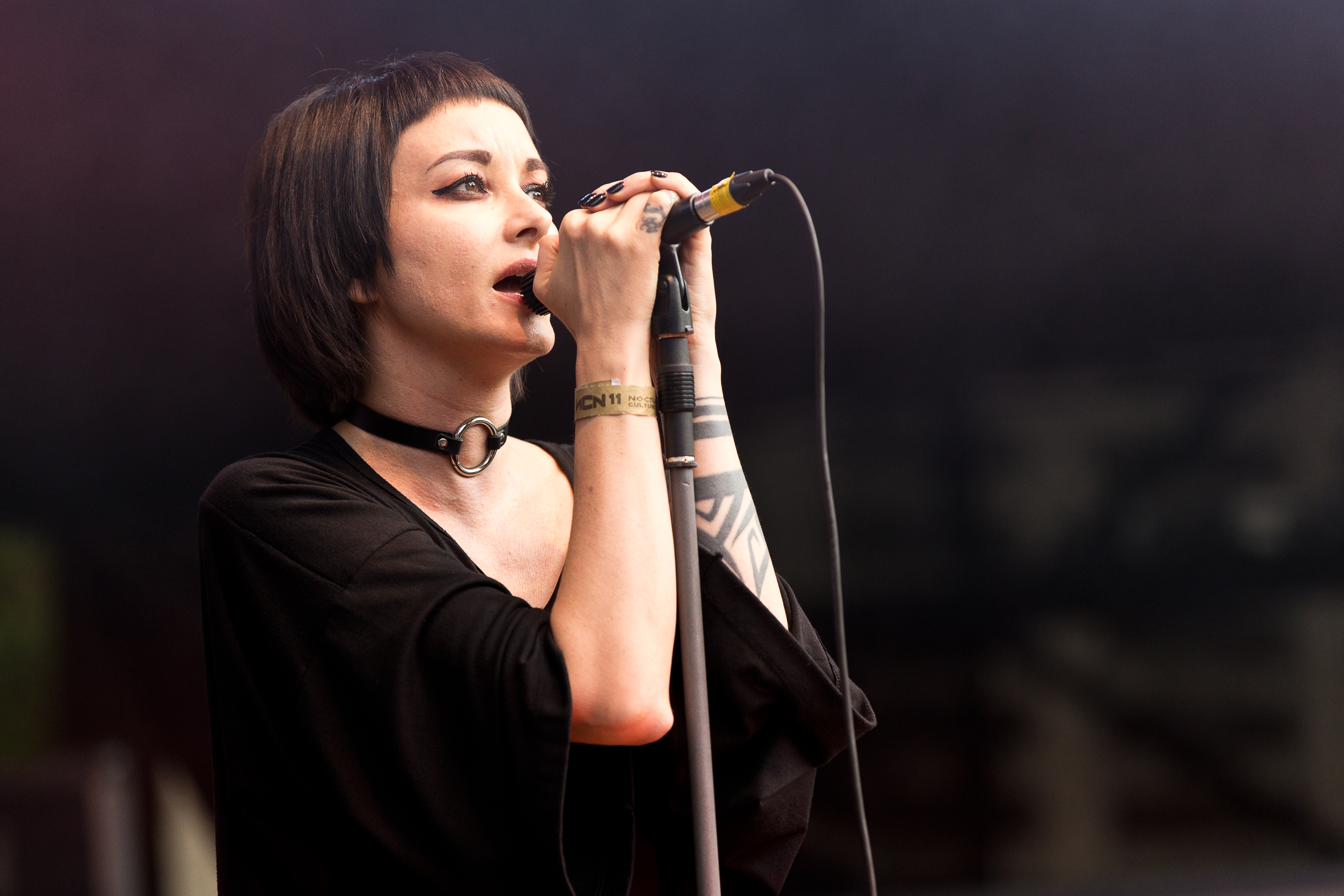
Tying Tiffany live at Nocturnal Culture Night Festival, Germany

Tying Tiffany attended the Art Institute and began experimenting with different artistic paths, from design, photography to music. In the early years of her career, she travelled Europe as a bass player and singer in various indie rock bands. She has also acted in some independent movies, artistic films and theatrical performances.

In 2005, decided to share an electronic music project including her song "You Know Me" in the Full Body Workout Vol. 2 compilation for the Berlin-based label Get Physical.

The debut album Undercover, released in 2005 on Jato Music label, moved from her passion for industrial, dark wave and punk music and her DJ experience. Undercover was acclaimed by the international press, the media and the public, and became one of the Italian music successes of 2006.

Tiffany then performed many concerts, playing in Italy and Europe and sharing the stage with artists like Iggy Pop, Buzzcocks, Stereo Total, The Rapture, Eels, dEUS, Tiga, and Alec Empire with whom she toured in 2008.

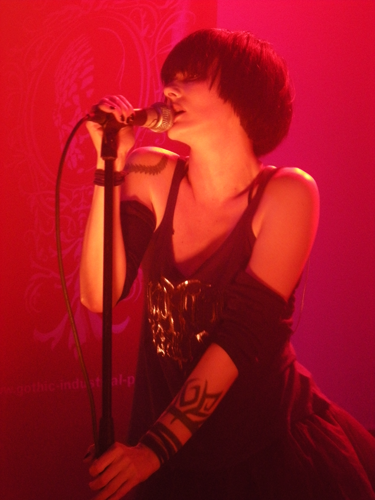
Tying Tiffany at Zeche Carl, Essen, Germany

After a show on the NME stage at Groningen's Festival, the label I Scream Records took a deal with Tying Tiffany to release her second album, Brain for Breakfast, in 2007. This album featured collaborations with Wolfgang Schrödl (Liquido), Pete Namlook and Nic Endo (Atari Teenage Riot and Alec Empire). Soon after this second album, a European tour followed, with over 80 dates. The other music video "Slow Motion" (with Nic Endo's remix) was aired in Europe and Asia.

In 2010, Tying Tiffany signed a deal with the German label Trisol for her third album Peoples Temple. The album takes inspiration from the homonymous San Francisco's cult led by Jim Jones, guilty of the 1978 mass suicide. Peoples Temple features a much darker and heavier sound than the previous two albums. Tiffany issued the singles "Miracle", "Lost Way" and "3 Circle". In 2011, the album was followed by the remix EP, Peoples Temple Remix Edition.

In the fall of 2010, CBS used the song "Storycide" on an episode of the TV series CSI: Las Vegas (season 11, episode 3, title Blood Moon).

In 2011, Tying Tiffany and Italian electronic producer and composer Lorenzo Montanà started a new project, T.T.L. (meaning "Through the Lens"). T.T.L. create instrumental music for soundtracks and trailers. Their song "Deep Shadow" was featured in The Hunger Games movie trailer. In the same year, Tying Tiffany's single "Drownin'" was featured on the football video game FIFA 12.

In January 2012, her fourth studio album was released, Dark Days, White Nights. The album was supported by the singles "Drownin'" and "New Colony".

On 13 March 2013, Tiffany released the four-track EP One on ZerOKilled Music. This EP included the free download single "One Second". Also in 2013, she performed in Austin, Texas, at SXSW festival.

On 24 February 2014, the new album Drop was released on ZerOKilled Music and Trisol. This album has been supported by a lot of media promotion over Europe and America.

== Discography ==
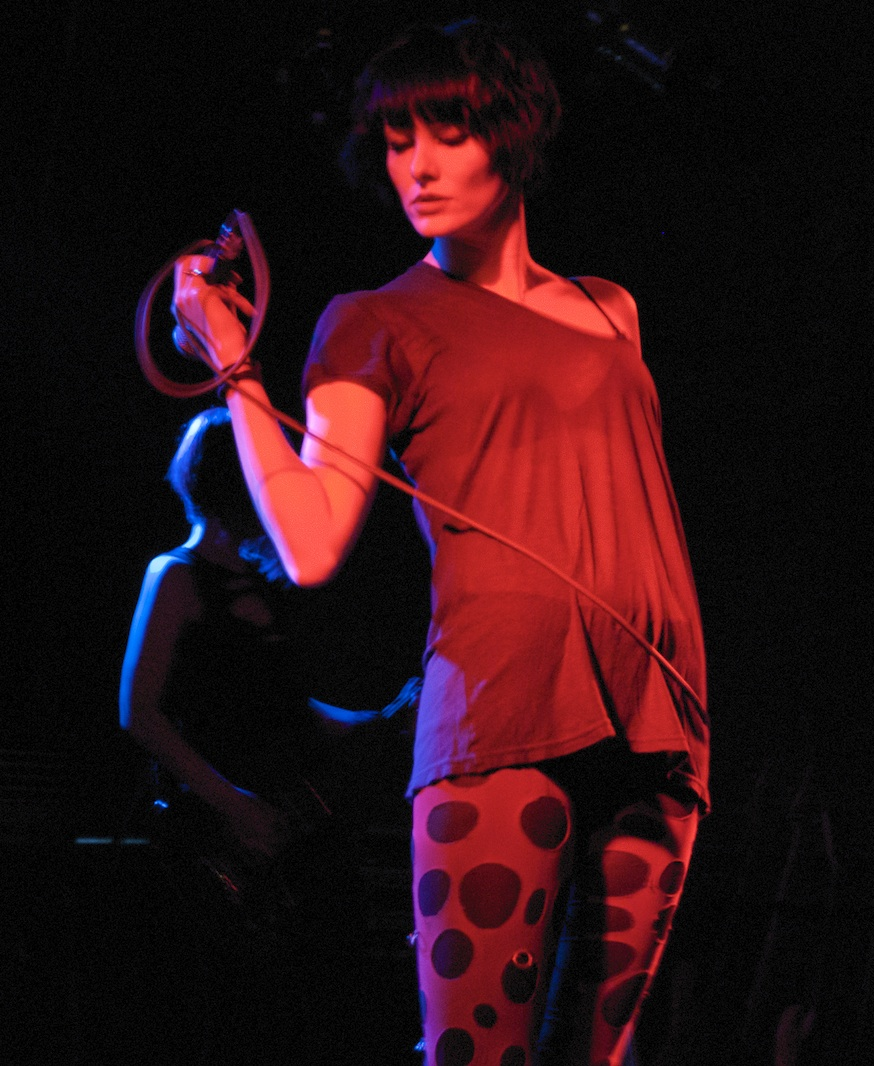

=== Studio albums ===
- Undercover (2005)
- Brain for Breakfast (2007)
- Peoples Temple (2010)
- Dark Days, White Nights (2012)
- Drop (2014)

=== Extended plays ===
- One (2013)

=== Remix albums ===
- Black Neon RMXs (2009)
- Peoples Temple Remix Edition (2011)

=== Singles ===
Year	Single	Label
2004	"I'm Not a Peach"	Jato Music
2006	"I Wanna Be Your Mp3"	Jato Music
2006	"You Know Me"	Get Physical
2006	"Honey Doll"	Jato Music
2006	"Honey Doll" (Remix)	Ocean Dark
2007	"I Wanna Be Your Mp3"	I Scream Records
2008	"I Can Do It" (Remix)	Ocean Dark
2008	"Pazza"	I Scream Records
2008	"Slow Motion"	I Scream Records
2010	"Miracle"	Trisol
2010	"Lost Way"	Trisol
2010	"3 Circle"	Trisol
2011	"Drownin'"	Trisol
2012	"New Colony"	Trisol
2013	"One Second"	ZerOKilled Music, Trisol
2013	"One Place"	ZerOKilled Music, Trisol
2014	"A Lone Boy"	ZerOKilled Music, Trisol

=== Music videos ===
- "I'm Not a Peach"
- "I Wanna Be Your Mp3"
- "Honey Doll"
- "Pazza"
- "I Wanna Be Your Mp3" (Diesel version)
- "Slow Motion"
- "Miracle"
- "Lost Way"
- "Lost Way" (live version)
- "3 Circle"
- "Show Me What You Got"
- "Border Line" (Alt version)
- "Drownin'"
- "New Colony"
- "Deep Shadow" (as T.T.L.)
- "5 AM"
- "One Second"
- "One Place"
- "A Lone Boy"

=== Guest appearances ===
- "Maneater" (Nelly Furtado cover with Digitalis Purpurea, included in the album Aseptic White (Dreamcell11, 2008)
- "Infinite Darkness" (from the album Decadence, Vol. 2, 2011)
- "State of Mind" (with Pete Namlook), included in the album "Air V – Jeux Dangereux" (FAX +49-69/450464)
