= Paparazzi (disambiguation) =

Paparazzi are photographers who take candid pictures of celebrities.

Paparazzi may also refer to:

== Film and television ==
- Paparazzi (1963 film), by Jacques Lozier, short documentary about the filming of Jean-Luc Godard's Contempt
- Paparazzi (1998 French film), a comedy film directed by Alain Berbérian
- Paparazzi (1998 Italian film), a comedy film directed by Neri Parenti
- Paparazzi (2004 film), an American thriller film directed by Paul Abascal
- Paparazzi: Eye in the Dark, a 2011 Nigerian film directed by Bayo Akinfemi
- Paparazzi (talk show), a 2010–2012 Philippine talk show

== Music ==
- "Paparazzi" (Girls' Generation song), 2012
- "Paparazzi" (Lady Gaga song), 2009
- "Paparazzi" (Xzibit song), 1996
- Paparazzi, an album by Supernova, 2019

== Other uses ==
- Paparazzi!: Tales of Tinseltown, a 1995 video game
- Paparazzi Productions, a 2006–2007 professional wrestling faction
- Paparazzi Project, an open-source autopilot system

== See also ==
- "Poparazzi", a song by Switchfoot from Learning to Breathe
- , the singular form of paparazzi
