= Space rock (disambiguation) =

Space rock may refer to:

- Space rock, a form or genre of music
- Asteroids are sometimes called space rocks
- Meteorites are also sometimes called space rocks
- "Space Rock" a song by Weezer from their 2002 album Maladroit
- "Space Rock", a song from the French band Rockets from their 1978 album On the Road Again
