= Du côté d'Orouët =

Du côté D'Orouët
- Directed by: Jacques Rozier
- Written by: Jacques Rozier; Alain Raygot
- Starring: Danièle Croisy; Françoise Guégan; Caroline Cartier
- Release date: 1971
- Running time: 150 minutes
- Country: France
- Language: French

Du côté d'Orouët (lit. Orouët's Way) is a 1973 French film directed by Jacques Rozier. The film is about three young girls who have their summer vacation in a villa by the seaside, in a municipality of Vendée called Orouët. Du côté d'Orouët was first screened at the Cannes Film Festival in 1971.

== Cast ==
- Danièle Croisy as Joëlle
- Françoise Guégan as Kareen
- Caroline Cartier as Caroline
- Bernard Ménez as Gilbert
- Patrick Verde as Patrick

== Reception ==
Richard Brody in his review of the film for The New Yorker stated that "The romantic heart of the film is the creation of memories; as the characters wander into bittersweet adventures, they leave breadcrumb trails of instant nostalgia. With his blend of delicate understatement and raucous spontaneity, Rozier may be the most secretly influential director of the era."
