= Paparazzi (1963 film) =

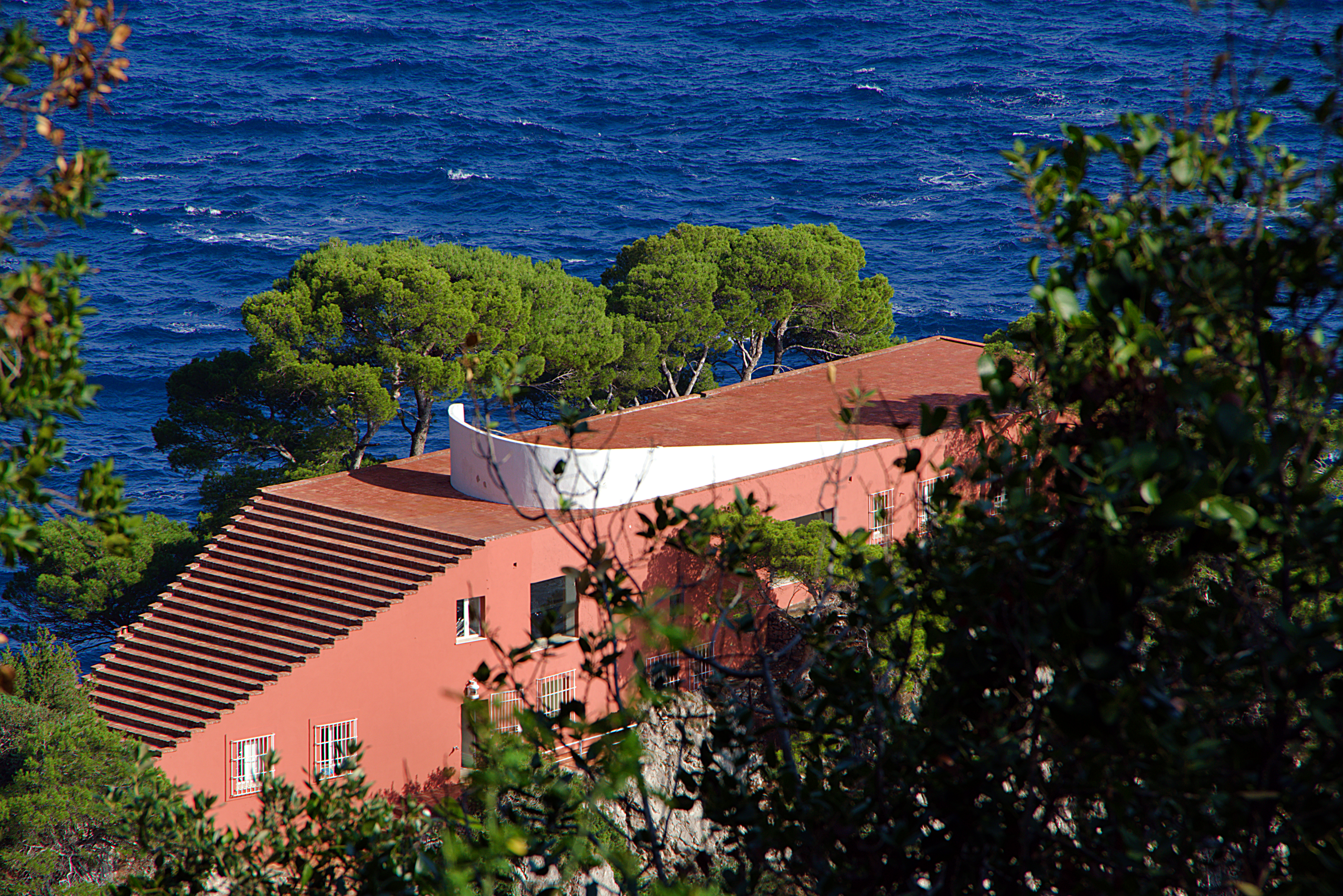
- The Villa Malaparte, where Bardot was the target of paparazzi
- Directed by: Jacques Rozier
- Starring: Brigitte Bardot; Jean-Luc Godard; Fritz Lang
- Release date: 1963
- Running time: 22 minutes
- Country: France
- Language: French

Paparazzi is a 1963 French short documentary film directed by Jacques Rozier. Alongside Le Parti des choses, by the same director and released the same year, it documents the Italian shooting of another Nouvelle Vague film, Jean-Luc Godard's Le Mépris.

== Content ==
The film documents the filming of Godard's Contempt in Capri, in and around the Villa Malaparte from May 17 until May 20, 1963. It focuses in particular on numerous paparazzi's relentless efforts to photograph Brigitte Bardot, one of the big stars of European cinema at the time.

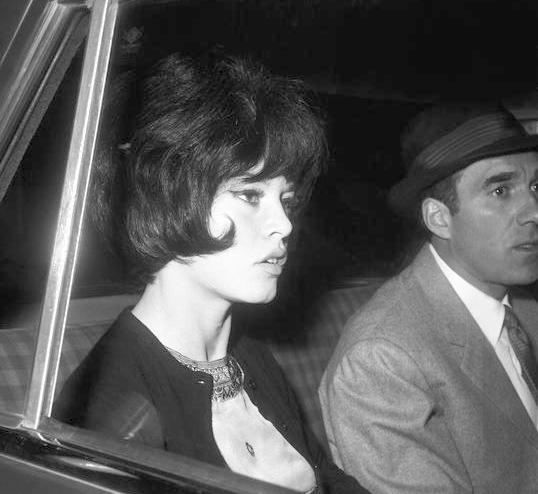
Bardot and Piccoli in Italy at the time of the filming of Paparazzi (and Contempt) (1963)

== Appear in the film ==
- Michel Piccoli
- Brigitte Bardot
- Jean-Luc Godard
- Fritz Lang
- Jack Palance
- Giorgia Moll

Narrators

- Jean Lescot
- Davide Tonelli

== Reception ==
A retrospective presentation of the film explained: "The sustained rhythm of the film follows the tensions between the paparazzi and the troupe. Rozier seems amused by this nervous atmosphere, to which he imparts the kind of inspired and playful tone that we find in the majority of his films. Like Renoir and Vigo, he is a free filmmaker. He observes insistently, with a detached but amused gaze, translating the world he gradually discovers around him into images through his own poetics and with the help of colourful and charismatic characters." Another retropesctive commentator stated, " By using the paparazzi’s method on themselves, the film became a novelty in its form and a fascinating document of its time." The film was also presented as follows: "It is a portrait of the sensationalist press who persecuted Brigitte Bardot at the time."
