= Le Parti des choses =

Le Parti des Choses
- Directed by: Jacques Rozier
- Starring: Brigitte Bardot; Jean-Luc Godard; Fritz Lang
- Narrated by: Jean Lescot; David Tonelli
- Release date: 1964
- Running time: 9 minutes
- Country: France
- Language: French

Le Parti des choses (lit. On the Side of Things) a.k.a. Bardot et Godard (lit. Bardot and Godard) or Le Parti des choses: Bardot et Godard is a 1964 short documentary directed by Jacques Rozier on the making of Jean-Luc Godard's film Le Mépris. It is included on the Criterion Collection DVD of Le Mépris.

Paparazzi, by the same director and released the same year, also documents the Italian shooting of Godard's film.

== Cast ==
- Brigitte Bardot
- Jean-Luc Godard
- Fritz Lang
- Jack Palance
- Michel Piccoli

== Reception ==
In a retrospective review for Le Monde, Jacques Mandelbaum writes:

The pleasure of travel and holidays, the reoccurring theme of water and islands, the poignant sense of time, the inclination for popular genres and actors, the hybridisation of documentary and fiction, the supremely artistic improvisations and sublime inversions indelibly mark this style of cinema, which evokes like none other the sensation, at once both joyous and melancholic, of the grace of existence and the fragility of the instant. Paradoxically, nothing is more in tune with the world, or nothing is more visionary than such an insular cinema, which manages to grasp the essential by proceeding in a zigzag manner.
