= Aseptic White =

Studio album by Digitalis Purpurea
- Released: October 2, 2008
- Recorded: September 2007–February 2008
- Genre: Industrial metal
- Length: 47:57
- Labels: Aural Music, Dreamcell11
- Producer: Pi Greco

Aseptic White released with "Dreamcell_11/Aural Music" is the first full-length album of the Italian industrial metal band Digitalis Purpurea. Recorded in winter 2007/2008, was released on October 2, 2008 with a worldwide distribution.

== Artwork ==
The artwork was realized in Spring 2008 by the graphic artist and photographer Anna Taschini. The theme is focused on the aseptic atmosphere recreated with the modular use of colors, mainly red and white, with references to Japanese culture.

== Track listing ==
All songs written by Pi Greco.

1. "Intro" - 3:16
2. "Coded Feel" - 4:39
3. "We're All Stars On Our Snuff Suicide" - 3:18
4. "Religious Mercy" - 4:26
5. "Not (Cut-Ups From A Criminal Profiling)" - 4:51
6. "Crittodream" - 4:01
7. "Dried Up And Spotted With Black Lipstick" - 4:45

Bonus tracks

1. "Ideomatic" (Rockets cover) featuring Celine Cecilia Angel, Sanguis et Cinis - 4:36
2. "Maneater" (Nelly Furtado cover) featuring Tying Tiffany - 4:19

Ghost track

1. "Rotten Meal - 9:41

== Video ==
1. "Coded Feel" - MPD Production 2007

== Personnel ==
Digitalis Purpurea

- Pi Greco – Vocals, Guitar, Bass guitar, Synthesizer, Drum machine, Songwriter, Producer
- C-Power - Guitar

Production

- Victor Love from Dope Stars Inc. - Mix and mastering except "Maneater" mixed by Pi Greco
- Tying Tiffany - Female vocals on "Maneater"
- Celine Cecilia Angel, Sanguis et Cinis - Female vocals on "Ideomatic"
- Track 01 "Intro" contains excerpts of the dialogue from the film π by Darren Aronofsky
- Anna Lucylle Taschini - Graphic Design, cover photography
- Sea of Sin - Cover model

== Reviews ==
- Metal.it link
- Dark Entries link
- Metal Hammer Grecee
- Goth Master
- Scream Magazine
- Metal Rage link
- Lords of Metal.nl link
- MetalItalia.com link
- Metal Hammer Italy
- Loudvision link
- Imhotep.no link
- Metallus link
- Heavy Metal.it link

Aseptic White was included in Darkentries' top 10 electro rock acts for the year 2009.
