= Dark Days, White Nights =

Studio album by Tying Tiffany
- Released: 2012
- Genre: Electronic, rock
- Length: 37:30
- Label: Trisol Music Group
- Producer: Lorenzo Montanà

Tying Tiffany chronology
Peoples Temple (2010)	Dark Days, White Nights (2012)	One (2013)

Dark Days, White Nights is the fourth studio album of the Italy-based musician Tying Tiffany.

== Track listing ==
1. "New Colony" - 4:17
2. "Dark Day" - 3:17
3. "Drownin'" - 3:25
4. "Sinistral" - 4:09
5. "She Never Dies" - 3:06
6. "Universe" - 3:31
7. "Unleashed" - 4:18
8. "5 AM" - 3:13
9. "Lepers of the Sun" - 3:36
10. "White Night" - 4:38
