= Dracula and Son =

- French theatrical release poster
- Directed by: Édouard Molinaro
- Written by: Alain Godard; Édouard Molinaro; Jean-Marie Poiré
- Based on: Paris-Vampire by Claude Klotz
- Produced by: Alain Poire
- Starring: Christopher Lee; Bernard Ménez
- Cinematography: Alain Levent
- Edited by: Monique Isnardon; Robert Isnardon
- Music by: Vladimir Cosma
- Distributed by: Gaumont Distribution
- Release dates: 15 September 1976 (France); 1978 (United Kingdom); 1979 (United States)
- Running time: 96 minutes
- Country: France
- Language: French

Dracula and Son (French: Dracula père et fils) is a 1976 French comedy horror film directed and written by Édouard Molinaro. The film is about a vampire father and son. Christopher Lee reprises his role as Count Dracula from the Hammer Films Dracula film series (in total, this was the 9th and final time Lee played the role of Dracula on film).

In the film, Count Dracula and his son are driven into exile by angry Transylvanian villagers. The father settles in London, and the son settles in Paris. They are reunited when both father and son feel an attraction to the same girl.

== Plot ==
With angry villagers driving them away from their castle in Transylvania, Count Dracula and his son Ferdinand head abroad. The Prince of Darkness ends up in London, England where he becomes a horror movie star exploiting his vampire status.

His son, meanwhile, is ashamed of his roots and ends up a night watchman in Paris, France where he falls for Nicole, a French girl. Naturally, tensions arise when father and son are reunited and both take a liking to the same girl.

== Cast ==
- Christopher Lee as Count Dracula
- Bernard Ménez as Ferdinand Poitevin
- Marie-Hélène Breillat as Nicole Clement
- Catherine Breillat as Herminie Poitevin
- Bernard Alane as Jean
- Jean-Claude Dauphin as Cristéa
- Anna Gael as Miss Gaylor
- Raymond Bussières as the ANPE old man
- Mustapha Dali as Khaleb
- Xavier Depraz as the majordomo
- Marthe Villalonga as The Subway Woman

== Production ==
Bernard Menez had appeared two years earlier in 1974's Tender Dracula opposite Peter Cushing, who had played Christopher Lee's nemesis in the Hammer Films Dracula film series.

In the spring of 1976, filming took place at the Château de Lassay in Lassay-les-Châteaux.

== Release ==
Dracula and Son was released in France on 15 September 1976. It was released in 1979 in the United States. The American distributor of the film cut many jokes in the film and replaced them with different gags.

=== Reception ===
Allmovie gave the film a rating of two stars out of five, but noted that "this was a very witty film prior to its decimation by an uncaring American distributor. A review in TV Guide gave a positive review of three stars out of four, noting that the film "actually works because it treats its subject with respect and doesn't degrade it for cheap, campy laughs." while noting that the film has a "poor dubbing job" that made the character Ferdinand Poitevin sound like a cross between Woody Allen and Austin Pendleton.

== See also ==
- Christopher Lee filmography
- List of comedy films of the 1970s
- List of French films of 1976
- List of horror films of 1976
