= Jean-Pierre Massiera =

French musical artist (1941–2019)

- Also known as: JPM; Areisam; Sierra
- Born: Jean-Pierre Bernard Massiera; 10 July 1941; Nice, France
- Died: 28 December 2019 (aged 78)
- Genres: Instrumental rock, freakbeat, psychedelic rock, prog rock, disco
- Occupations: Producer, recording engineer, composer
- Years active: 1962–2019

Jean-Pierre Massiera (10 July 1941 – 28 December 2019), sometimes referred to by his initials JPM, was a French musician, composer, record producer, sound engineer, and recording studio owner. His prolific output between the 1960s and 1990s ranged across pop instrumentals, psychedelic rock and disco music, often incorporating elements of musique concrète, field recordings and samples in an eccentrically experimental and unique style. His work is usually credited under one-off band names such as Les Maledictus Sound, Horrific Child, and Herman's Rocket.

He has been called "the French Joe Meek". The Guardian's reviewer Ben Thompson called his work "a fetid miasma of sick humour, sound effects and unexpectedly first-rate musicianship", and reviewer William Rauscher described him as "a freewheeling auteur whose outrageous forays in trashy pop culture mix low-brow sensuality with oddball experimentation".

== Early life and career ==
Massiera was born in Nice, France, but grew up in Córdoba and Buenos Aires, Argentina. After learning guitar, he returned to France when in his teens, and formed the instrumental beat group, Les Milords. Massiera played lead guitar; the other band members were Pierre Malaussena (rhythm guitar), Patrick Batteu (bass), and Francis Cavallaro (drums). After several singles in the style of British and American instrumental groups such as the Shadows and the Ventures, Massiera and Malaussena formed a new band in 1964, under the name of Les Monégasques, with Fernand "Nicky" Cafiero (bass) and Jean Haumont (drums). The band also played on recordings by pop singer Gérard Brent.

== Freakbeat and progressive rock ==
In 1967, Massiera set up his own recording studio, Studio d’Enregistrement Méditerranéen (SEM) in Nice, with good quality recording equipment, and began recording local musicians including drummer André Ceccarelli and singers Jocy (later known as Jessy Joyce, real name Joyce Pepino) and Basile. In 1968 he composed and produced the album Attention, credited to Les Maledictus Sound. As well as Massiera and Ceccarelli, the musicians included guitarist Patrick Djivas, later of the band PFM. One track was contentiously called "Jim Clark Was Driving Recklessly" – the racing driver Jim Clark had been killed in a crash a few months previously.

In late 1968, Massiera sold his studio and moved to Quebec, but returned to France the following year. Massiera continued to work as a producer for pop and freakbeat musicians in the late 1960s and early 1970s, including the single "Pardon pour Buchenwald" by Erik, on which he included samples of Nazi speeches. He also added a variety of electronic effects on the 1971 heavy rock album Chico Magnetic Band by Mahmoud "Chico" Ayari. In 1972, with the support of his half-brother Bernard Torelli, he opened a new 16-track studio, Antibes Studio 16, known as the Azurville studio. The studio was used by John McLaughlin, Bill Wyman, and many others.

In 1974, he composed and produced the album Visitors, with an extraterrestrial theme. The musicians included vocalist Gérard Brent, violinist Didier Lockwood (later of Magma), and Bernard Torelli on guitar. This was followed in 1976 by Atlantide, with Patrick Attali on lead vocals and Torelli on guitar, sitar and Mellotron. Also in 1976, Massiera composed and produced one of his most notable albums, L'Etrange Mr. Whinster, credited to the act Horrific Child and marketed as a "psychological experience". The album incorporated African rhythms, samples, spoken excerpts from writers Baudelaire, Lovecraft and Lautréamont, and contributions from Massiera's regular contributors Torelli, Brent, and Jessy Joyce, among others. He also co-wrote and co-produced Jessy Joyce's album Love Me, and the single "Toi qui rève de baisers" credited to Sex Convention.

The 1977 album Turn Radio On, was co-composed by Massiera and Torelli, and co-produced by Massiera and Georges Colleuil. Massiera also produced folk rock albums by Valéry Btesh, and engineered releases by proto-punk band Little Bob Story. Massiera's next album, Phantasmes, was credited to JPM & Co. and contains a mixture of styles including chanson, disco, experimental electronic music and prog rock, as well as the track "Dali court", a parody of Boney M's "Daddy Cool" dedicated to Salvador Dalí, and a version of Michel Legrand's "Les moulins de mon coeur". Also in 1977, Massiera issued a single under his own name, "Aime moi", a version of Deep Purple's "Child in Time".

== Disco music and later projects ==
The following year he co-wrote and produced the album Space Woman, credited to the act Herman's Rocket. The "cosmic disco" album was commissioned by record label owner Humbert "Mémé" Ibach, and the title track became one of Massiera's best-known tracks. Massiera's next album, Galactic Soul (also known as Synthetic Soul) followed a similar approach, but this time was credited as being by Venus Gang. Both albums were produced with Torelli as arranger, and both included reworkings of Massiera's earlier material as well as that of others. Also in 1978, Massiera co-wrote and co-produced Jessy Joyce's disco album J. Joyce & Co., and co-wrote and produced one of his best-known albums, Human Egg, the name of both the album and the act. The prog rock album featured many of Massiera's regular contributors including Bernard Torelli, Patrick Attali, Tony Bonfils, Jessy Joyce and André Ceccarelli.

Before the end of the 1970s, Massiera also produced disco albums by Micky & Joyce (Hold Up) and Trans Am Dancing by Friends featuring singer Sparkle Tuhran. He left Antibes in 1979, and opened the studio Jean Jaurès in Paris for Philips Records. In 1981 he produced the jazz-rock album Debbi by Francis Lockwood, the disco-reggae album La Chica by African Magic Combo, and a second album credited to Visitors, as well as numerous singles for other artists, in some cases as a co-producer with Torelli or others. Through the 1980s Massiera continued to work as a writer and producer, but at a lower level of intensity than before, sometimes using the pseudonyms Areisam or Sierra. With Torelli in 1983, he wrote and produced the 12-inch single "Inch Allah", credited as Orient Express.

In the mid-1980s he left Paris and established a new studio in Le Bar-sur-Loup. In 1992, on the occasion of Columbus' quincentennial, he co-wrote and produced the album Red Power by Indian Nation. A second album on the same theme, Red Soul, was issued in 1995.

== Reissues ==
Selections of Massiera's work have been issued on CD, as Psychoses Freakoïd (1963-1978), Psychoses Discoïd (1976-1981) (both issued by the Canadian label Mucho Gusto Records, 2007), and Midnight Massiera: The B-Music of Jean-Pierre Massiera (Finders Keepers Records, 2009).
