= Bernard Ménez =

French actor (born 1944)

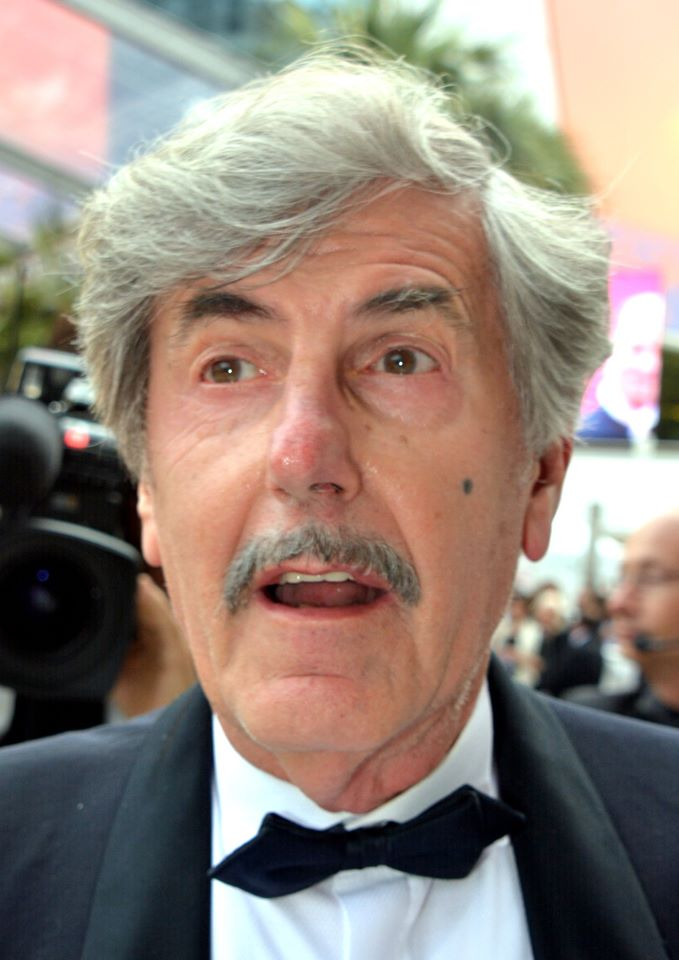
- Bernard Ménez at the 2019 Cannes Film Festival
- Born: 8 August 1944 (age 81); Mailly-le-Château, France
- Occupation: Actor
- Years active: 1969-present

Bernard Ménez (born 8 August 1944, in Mailly-le-Chateau) is a French actor. He has appeared in more than seventy films since 1969.

== Selected filmography ==
Film
Year	Title	Role	Notes
1973	Day for Night	Bernard	
1973	Du Cote D'Orouet	Gilbert	
1974	Comme un pot de fraises	Philippe	
1974	Tender Dracula	Alfred	
1976	Dracula and Son	Ferdinand Poitevin	
1978	Tendrement vache	Pierre Ganet	
1980	L'avare	La Flèche	
1982	Ça va faire mal !	Francois Léaud	
1986	Maine-Ocean Express	Gallec	
1986	Didi Drives Me Crazy	Marcel	
2003	Leave Your Hands on My Hips	The concierge	
2011	Love Lasts Three Years	Marc's father	
