= Peoples Temple (album) =

Studio album by Tying Tiffany
- Released: 2010
- Genre: Electronic, rock
- Length: 33:43
- Label: Trisol Music Group
- Producer: Lorenzo Montanà

Tying Tiffany chronology
Brain for Breakfast (2007)	Peoples Temple (2010)	Dark Days, White Nights (2012)

Peoples Temple is the third studio album by the Italy-based musician Tying Tiffany. In 2011, the album was followed by the remix EP Peoples Temple Remix Edition.

== Peoples Temple track listing ==
1. "3 Circle" - 3:36
2. "Storycide" - 2:53
3. "Lost Way" - 3:21
4. "One Breath" - 3:18
5. "Still In My Head" - 2:32
6. "Miracle" - 3:18
7. "Cecille" - 3:02
8. "Borderline" - 4:21
9. "Ghoul" - 3:16
10. "Show Me What You Got" - 4:06

== Peoples Temple Remix Edition track listing ==
1. "3 Circle" (First Black Pope Remix) - 4:16
2. "Storycide" (Spiral69 Remix) - 3:29
3. "Miracle" (XP8 Remix) - 5:25
4. "Show Me What You Got" (RevCo World Remix) - 4:35
5. "Lost Way" (YLHCSD Remix) - 4:18
6. "Ghoul" (Golkonda Remix) - 3:14
7. "Miracle" (Iceone Feat Electro Disciples Remix) - 3:27
8. "Borderline" (Alt Remix) - 3:53
