= Brain for Breakfast =

Studio album by Tying Tiffany
- Released: 2007
- Genre: Electronic
- Length: 46:17
- Label: Jato Music, I Scream Records

Tying Tiffany chronology
Undercover (2005)	Brain for Breakfast (2007)	Peoples Temple (2010)

Brain for Breakfast is the second studio album by the Italy-based musician Tying Tiffany.

== Track listing ==
1. "Chinga" - 1:53
2. "Not a Shame" - 2:41
3. "I Can Do It" - 4:18
4. "Download Me" - 3:18 (feat. Wolfgang Schrodl)
5. "I'd Rather Bet on Outsiders" - 3:35
6. "Satellite" - 3:53
7. "I Wanna Be Your MP3" - 2:10
8. "Unstoppable Spanker" - 3:40 (feat. Santo Niente)
9. "Pazza" - 2:57
10. "Slow Motion [Nic Endo Remix]" - 4:20
11. "Shake a Snake" - 2:19
12. "Hollywood Hook" - 3:30
13. "Easy Life" - 2:24
14. "State of Mind" - 5:19 (feat. Pete Namlook)
