= Undercover (Tying Tiffany album) =

Studio album by Tying Tiffany
- Released: 2005
- Genre: Electronic
- Length: 31:31
- Label: Jato Music

Tying Tiffany chronology
Undercover (2005)	Brain for Breakfast (2007)

Undercover is the debut studio album of the Italian musician Tying Tiffany.

== Track listing ==
1. "Wake Up" - 3:15
2. "Cat Killer Show" - 3:01
3. "LCD Soundsystem Is Playing at My House" - 2:33
4. "Last Weekend" - 1:03
5. "Sugar Boy, Sugar Girl" - 1:59
6. "I'm Not a Peach" - 2:42
7. "I Wanna Be Your MP3" - 2:05
8. "Telekoma" - 0:53
9. "Honey Doll" - 3:56
10. "Running Bastard" - 0:44
11. "Black Neon" - 2:03
12. "You Know Me" - 5:42
13. "Cloud" - 1:35
