= Maine-Ocean Express =

- Directed by: Jacques Rozier
- Starring: Bernard Ménez; Yves Afonso; Luis Rego
- Release date: 16 April 1986
- Running time: 2h 10min
- Country: France
- Language: French

Maine-Ocean Express (French: Maine Océan) is a 1986 French comedy film directed by Jacques Rozier.

== Cast ==
- Bernard Ménez - Le Garrec
- Yves Afonso - Petitgas Marcel
- Luis Rego - Lucien Pontoiseau
- Lydia Feld - Mimi de Saint-Marc
- Rosa-Maria Gomes - Dejanira
- Pedro Armendáriz Jr. - Pedro De La Moccorra
- Bernard Dumaine - President of the Court
- Jean-Paul Bonnaire - District attorney
- Christian Bouillette - Lucien Vallée
