= Jean-Paul Bonnaire =

French actor (1943–2013)

- Born: 3 October 1943; Chaux, France
- Died: 28 March 2013 (aged 69); Paris, France
- Occupation: Actor
- Years active: 1975–2013

Jean-Paul Bonnaire (3 October 1943 – 28 March 2013) was a French actor. He appeared in more than 100 films from 1975 to 2013. He also appeared in television and theater.

== Selected filmography ==
Year	Title	Role	Notes
1986	Maine-Ocean Express		
1999	Our Happy Lives		
2004	The Chorus	Maxence	
2005	Joséphine, ange gardien	Sylvain	TV series (1 episode)
2006	Four Stars		
2007	The Second Wind	Theo	
2012	Mobile Home	Luc	
