= Fifi Martingale =

2001 film by Jacques Rozier

- Directed by: Jacques Rozier
- Starring: Jean Lefebvre; Lili Vonderfeld
- Release date: 2001
- Running time: 127 minutes
- Country: France
- Language: French

Fifi Martingale is a 2001 French film directed by Jacques Rozier. The film is about a theater company attempting to put on a new play. It was Jean Lefebvre's last film.

== Cast ==
- Jean Lefebvre as Gaston Manzanarès
- Lili Vonderfeld as Fifi
- Mike Marshall as the Author
- Jacques Petitjean as the Director
- Yves Afonso as Yves Lempereur
- François Chattot as Père Popelkov
- Alexandra Stewart as the Ambassador
- Jacques François as the Ambassador
- Roger Trapp as The consul of Moldova
- Luis Rego

== Production ==
Bernard Tapie was originally the actor for the main role (eventually played by Lefebvre) but the first left the project after having filmed a few scenes, that were obviously not kept.

== Release ==
The film was never released in theaters despite having been shown at the Venice Mostra in 2001.

== Reception ==
"Much of the film’s humor will be lost on audiences who don’t know the significance of names like Moliere and Tartuffe, and many of the puns included in the dialogue will also fall on unresponsive ears.", commented Variety.
