= Adieu Philippine =

1962 film directed by Jacques Rozier

- Directed by: Jacques Rozier
- Written by: Jacques Rozier; Michèle O'Glor
- Starring: Jean-Claude Aimini; Stefania Sabatini; Yveline Céry
- Release dates: 8 January 1962 (Premiere in Paris); 25 September 1963 (France)
- Running time: 106 minutes
- Country: France
- Language: French

Adieu Philippine is a 1962 French film directed by Jacques Rozier. The film, Rozier's first feature, portrays French youths at the time of the Algerian War.

Although the film encountered difficulties in terms of production and distribution and was a commercial failure at its release, it has been praised as one of the key films of the French New Wave. It premiered in January 1962 in Paris and was later screened at the 1962 Cannes Film Festival but did not receive an actual theatrical release in France until September 1963.

== Plot ==
Michel is a bored young man in Paris about to be called up for military service in Algeria. He works as a camera technician at a TV station. One day he meets two teenage girls, Juliette and Liliane, and begins dating them both separately. Michel purposely gets himself fired from his job and goes on vacation to Corsica to enjoy his last days before going into the army. The two girls follow him there and the three search for a commercial film director who owes Michel money. Eventually, Michel chooses Juliette which creates a rift between the two girls. They finally find the film director who manages to elude them again. After both girls become easily frustrated at the rugged environment and annoyed at each other, it becomes clear that they are both upset at Michel's impending departure. Finally, Michel receives word that he is to join his regiment in four days and must catch the first boat back to the mainland. Juliette and Liliane sadly watch Michel sail away on a boat headed for France.

=== Note ===
There is no character named Philippine in the film. "The title refers to a wishing game that French children play."

== Cast ==
- Jean-Claude Aimini as Michel
- Daniel Descamps as Daniel
- Stefania Sabatini as Juliette
- Yveline Céry as Liliane
- Vittorio Caprioli as Pachala
- David Tonelli as Horatio
- Annie Markhan as Juliette (voice)
- André Tarroux as Régnier de l'Îsle
- Christian Longuet as Christian
- Michel Soyet as André

== Reception ==
François Truffaut praised the film and called it "the clearest success of the new cinema where spontaneity is all the more powerful when it is the result of long and careful work." In July 2018, it was selected to be screened in the Venice Classics section at the 75th Venice International Film Festival.
