= Tender Dracula =

- Directed by: Pierre Grunstein
- Written by: Justin Lenoir
- Starring: Peter Cushing; Alida Valli; Miou-Miou; Bernard Menez; Nathalie Courval; Stephane Shandor
- Music by: Karl Heinz Schäfer
- Production companies: Les Films Christian Fechner; Renn Productions; VMP
- Distributed by: AMLF
- Release date: August 7, 1974
- Running time: 98 minutes
- Country: France
- Language: French

Tender Dracula, or Confessions of a Blood Drinker (French: Tendre Dracula) is a 1974 French horror comedy film directed by Pierre Grunstein. The film stars Peter Cushing, Alida Valli, Bernard Ménez and Miou-Miou.

== Plot ==
The story involves two scriptwriters and two girls who are ordered by their director to visit the castle home of a horror actor (Peter Cushing) and to talk him out of his intention to change from horror films to romantic ones. The longer they stay in the castle, the more likely it seems that the actor is an actual vampire.

== Cast ==
- Peter Cushing as MacGregor
- Alida Valli as Heloise
- Bernard Menez as Alfred
- Miou-Miou as Marie
- Nathalie Courval as Madeline
- Stephane Shandor as Boris
- Julien Guiomar as Producer

== Production ==
The film was shot between February 11, 1974, and March 29, 1974.

Two years later Menez would appear opposite Cushing's longtime Hammer Films Dracula film series nemesis Christopher Lee in 1976's Dracula and Son.

== Release ==
The film was released on August 7, 1974. The film was released in France with the alternative title La Grande Trouille. It was released in the United States with the titles Tender Dracula, or Confessions of a Blood Drinker and The Big Scare. It was released in the United States in January 1975.

== Bibliography ==
- Hallenbeck, Bruce G. (2009). Comedy-Horror Films: A Chronological History, 1914-2008. McFarland. ISBN 9780786433322.
- Browning, John Edgar; Picart, Caroline Joan (2011). Dracula in Visual Media:Film, Television, Comic Book and Electronic Game Appearances, 1921-2010. McFarland. ISBN 9780786433650.
