= One (Tying Tiffany EP) =

EP by Tying Tiffany
- Released: 12 March 2013
- Genre: Electronic, synthpop
- Length: 14:26
- Label: ZerOKilled Music, Mecanica
- Producer: Tying Tiffany

Tying Tiffany chronology
Dark Days, White Nights (2012)	One (2013)

One is an EP by Italian electronic musician Tying Tiffany. It was released on 12 March 2013 on ZerOKilled Music and on a 10" Picture Disc vinyl on 1 August 2013 on Mecanica. The EP consists of four songs, linked by "one" theme and having almost the same length each.

The single "One Second" was available as free download. Tiffany also released a music video for "One Second".

== Reception ==
The EP received positive reviews.

Nylon Magazine described her music as: "sonically, Tying Tiffany is like the goth daughter of an Italo-disco titan–yes, her music's electro-pop, but with a dark edge. Think Crystal Castles at their most upbeat or The Knife at their most straightforward".

The Owl Mag stated that "'One' never seems to fall short and if anything, it's worth coming back to every so often, so if you're searching for a dark yet upbeat release that'll keep your attention, then there's no need to look any further.

Professional ratings
Review scores
Source	Rating
Nylon Magazine	(positive)
The Owl Mag	(positive)

== Track listing ==
1. "One Second" - 3:37
2. "One Girl" - 3:32
3. "One Place" - 3:38
4. "One End" - 3:37
