= Lolita KompleX =

Austrian gothic rock band

- Origin: Austria
- Genres: Gothic rock, alternative rock, gothic metal, shock rock
- Years active: 2007-
- Members: Vocals: Eve Evangel; Vocals: Nana Evangel; Guitar: Dushi Dushinson; Bass: Loony
- Website: http://www.lolitakomplex.net

Lolita KompleX is an Austrian gothic rock band.

== History ==
After the break-up of his former band Sanguis et Cinis, Eve Evangel founded Lolita KompleX (with former Sanguis bandmate Dushi) in early 2008 to realize his idea of a Lolita fashion inspired, but independent Gothic Metal band.

== Discography ==
=== Albums ===
- 2011: Le Cabaret des Marionnettes
- 2015: The Greatest Show on Earth
- 2019: ESCAPISM

=== Singles and EPs ===
- 2013: "All the Things She Said" (t.A.T.u. cover)
- 2015: "Circus (Welcome to the)"
- 2018: Nutcracker EP
- 2019: "Stranger in a Strange Land"
