= Rockets (Rockets album) =

Studio album by Rockets
- Released: June 1976
- Recorded: 1975–1976 at Studio Société Française Du Son, Paris
- Genre: Space rock, electronica, synthpop, experimental, ambient
- Length: 37:45
- Label: Decca
- Producer: Claude Lemoine

Rockets chronology
Rockets (1976)	On the Road Again (1978)

Rockets is the debut self-titled studio album by French space rock band Rockets, released in June 1976. It is the only full album by the band to feature vocals in French (albeit, with some English lyrics in two tracks). In spite of their nationality, all subsequent albums are sung in English, with the exception of one song on the second and one on the sixth album.

== Track listing ==
No.	Title	Writer(s)	Translation	Length
1.	"Apache" (The Shadows cover)	Jerry Lordan		4:00
2.	"Balade sur Mars"	Gerard Tempesti	Walk on Mars	2:15
3.	"Fils du Ciel"	Christian Le Bartz, Claude Mainguy	Children of the Sky	3:10
4.	"Futur Woman"	Philippe Renaux	Woman of the Future	3:35
5.	"Terre Larbour"	Bernard Torelli	Larbour Ground	1:00
6.	"Le Chemin"	Le Bartz, Gerard L'Her	The Way	4:00
7.	"Apesanteur"	Claire-Lise Charbonnier, Alain Goldstein	Weightlessness	6:30
8.	"Ave Maria"	Franz Schubert		3:45
9.	"Last Space Train" (The Spotnicks cover)	B. Calmedo		3:00
10.	"Genese Future"	François Bréant	Future Genesis	6:30
Total length:				37:45

Italian editions
No.	Title	Writer(s)	Translation	Length
11.	"Futur Woman" (long version)	Renaux	Woman of the Future	5:54
Total length:				43:39

German edition
No.	Title	Writer(s)	Translation	Length
1.	"Balade sur Mars"	Tempesti	Walk on Mars	2:15
2.	"Fils du Ciel"	Le Bartz, Mainguy	Child of the Sky	3:10
3.	"Futur Woman"	Renaux	Woman of the Future	3:35
4.	"Terre Larbour"	Torelli	Larbour Ground	1:00
5.	"Space Rock"	Rockets		9:00
6.	"Last Space Train"	Calmedo		3:00
7.	"Apesanteur"	Golstein, Charbonnier	Weightlessness	6:30
8.	"Genese Future"	François Bréant	Future Genesis	6:30
9.	"Don't Be Sad"	L'Her		4:40
Total length:				39:40

== Personnel ==
Rockets

- Christian Le Bartz – vocals
- "Little" Gerard L'Her – bass, vocals
- Alain Maratrat – guitar
- Bernard Torelli – guitar
- Michael Goubet – keyboards
- Alain Groetzinger – drums, percussion

Additional personnel

- Claude Lemoine – production
- Karl Heinz Schäfer – strings, arrangements, vocals on "Futur Woman"
- J. J. Bernier – photography
- François Bréant – keyboards on "Genese Future"

== Release history ==
Region	Date	Label	Format	Catalog
France	June 1976	Decca Records/IPG Records	LP album	278.116
Canada	June 1976	Deram Records/London Records	LP album	XDEF-141
Italy	September 1977	Derby Records	LP album	DBR 20005
Italy	September 1977	Derby Records	Compact Cassette	30 DBR 20005
Japan	September 1977	King Records/London Records	LP album	GP 1049
Italy (reissue)	1977	Derby Records/CGD Records	LP album	DBR 20005
Italy (reissue)	1977	Rockland Records	LP album	RKL 25004
Germany	1978	Ariola Records	LP album	26025 OT
Spain	1978	Ariola-Eurodisc	LP album	26050.I
Italy (reissue)	1984	CGD Records	LP album	RKL 1154
