= Rockets (band) =

- Origin: Paris, France
- Genres: Space rock, space disco, synth-pop
- Years active: 1974–1986, 1992, 2000-present

Rockets is a French space rock band that formed in Paris in 1974 and relocated to Italy in 1978. In their most successful era (1977–1982) the line-up comprised vocalist Christian Le Bartz (1951-2025), bassist and vocalist "Little" Gérard L'Her (1952), guitarist and keyboardist Alain Maratrat (1956-2025), drummer and percussionist Alain Groetzinger (1955), and keyboardist Fabrice Quagliotti (1961). Their initial genre was rock, immediately defined by the press as 'space rock' due to the sci-fi veins in the lyrics, the electronic sounds and the stage appearance. Later it was instead associated with 'disco music' and finally 'synth-pop'.

The Rockets never had any significant success abroad, except in a few countries such as Italy. Mainly responsible for the band's success in Italy was producer Maurizio Cannici, manager of CGD-Messaggerie Musicali, who, in 1978, after seeing them perform in a discotheque in Cannes, succeeded in making them celebrities in that country. In the same year, the group held their first concert in Italy, at the Pesaro Summer Show. Contributing most to their popularity in Italy was the performance they gave a short time later at the Teatro Lirico in Milan.

The group's vocals were heavily processed to sound like they were from another world. The group used distinctive spatial aesthetics of lamé suits, musical instruments shaped like stars and faces painted in silver. Already during their early concerts, the group made use of eccentric and elaborate choreography, for instance ‘landing’ on stage from small spaceships, using smoke bombs and lasers. The group's daring set designs led to some controversial episodes. During an episode of Discoring in April 1979, during the performance of "Electric Delight", singer Christian Le Bartz, fired incendiary firecrackers into the audience with a fake bazooka, inadvertently hitting a girl in the face and burning the audience's clothes (this would later become known). Similarly, during the spring of the same year, the band's choreography led to some injuries in the audience during a performance at a Riccione nightclub.

The band went through a number of name changes very early in their career and in later years, being known as Les Rockets, Rocket Men and Rok-Etz, among others. In the year 2000, Fabrice Quagliotti decided to reform the band (initially with the name Rockets N.D.P.), but with a totally new line-up. This brought to an anomalous situation, as far as none of the former members agreed to hold a reunion. In fact, the last former member to leave the band was Alain Maratrat, in 1992.

== Band members ==
Rockets

- John Biancale – vocals (2006–present)
- Gianluca Martino – guitar (2004–present)
- Rosaire Riccobono – bass (2004–present)
- Fabrice Quagliotti – keyboards (1977–present)
- Eugenio U. G. Mori – drums, percussion (2005–present)

Former members

- Patrick Mallet – drums (1974)
- Guy Maratrat – guitar (1974–1975)
- André Thus – keyboards (1974–1975)
- Christian Le Bartz – vocals (1974–1983) (deceased in 2025)
- Alain Groetzinger – drums, percussion (1974–1983)
- "Little" Gérard L'Her – bass, vocals (1974–1984)
- Alain Maratrat – guitar, keyboards (1974–1992) (deceased in 2025)
- Michel Goubet – keyboards (1976–1977)
- Bernard Torelli – guitar (1975–1976)
- Bertin Hugo – keyboards (1977)
- Sal Solo – vocals (1984–1992)
- Little B. – drums (2000–2005)

Guest musicians

- Phil Gould – drums (1986)
- Andrew Paresi – drums (1986)
- Bruce Nockles – trumpet (1986)
- Alison Lee – vocals (1986)
- Paul McClements – vocals (1986)
- Carole Cook – vocals (1986)
- Nick Beggs – bass (1992)
- Herve Koster – drums (1992)
- Michael Payne – percussion, vocals (1992)
- Matt Rossato – guitar (2001–2004)

== Discography ==
- Rockets (1976)
- On the Road Again (1978)
- Plasteroïd (1979)
- Galaxy (1980)
- π 3,14 (1981)
- Atomic (1982)
- Imperception (1984)
- One Way (1986)
- Another Future (1992)
- Don't Stop (2003)
- Kaos (2014)
- Wonderland (2019)
- Alienation (2021)
- Time Machine (2023)
- The Final Frontier (2024)

== Covers ==
- A cover version of their song "Ideomatic" was recorded by the industrial metal band Digitalis Purpurea and was included in the free net compilation Italian Body Music Vol. 2. Digitalis Purpurea re-released the song on their album Aseptic White featuring Celine Cecilia Angel from the Austrian project Sanguis et Cinis.
- International prog metal space opera Docker's Guild recorded a version of "Prophecy" (from Galaxy, 1980) on their debut album The Mystic Technocracy - Season 1: The Age of Ignorance (Lion Music, 2012). Featured on the track are Gregg Bissonette (drums), Tony Franklin (bass), Guthrie Govan (guitars) and project mastermind Douglas R. Docker (keyboards). Their third album The Mystic Technocracy - Season 2: The Age of Entropy (Elevate Records, 2022) features "Le Chemin" (from the debut self-titled album Rockets, 1976) and "Atlantis Town" (from Plasteroid, 1979).
