= Plasteroïd =

Studio album by Rockets
- Released: May 1979
- Recorded: January–February 1979 at Decca Studios, Paris
- Genre: Space rock, electronica, synthpop, experimental, ambient
- Label: Rockland
- Producer: Claude Lemoine

Rockets chronology
Sound of the Future (1979)	Plasteroïd (1979)	Galaxy (1980)

Plasteroïd is the third studio album by the electronic band Rockets. It was released in 1979 on Rockland Records.

== Track listing ==
No.	Title	Writer(s)	Length
1.	"Electric Delight"	Gerard L'Her, Alain Maratrat	5:10
2.	"Astral World"	L'Her, Maratrat	4:35
3.	"If You Drive"	L'Her, Maratrat	5:00
4.	"Legion of Aliens"	L'Her	3:35
5.	"Anastasis"	Maratrat	4:30
6.	"Cosmic Feeling"	Philippe Renaux, Peter Collins	5:45
7.	"Atlantis Town"	L'Her	4:22
8.	"Back to Your Planet"	L'Her	4:10

== Personnel ==
Rockets

- Christian Le Bartz – vocals
- "Little" Gerard L'Her – bass, vocals
- Alain Maratrat – guitar, keyboards, vocals on "Atlantis Town"
- Fabrice Quagliotti – keyboards
- Alain Groetzinger – drums, percussion

Additional personnel

- Claude Lemoine – production
- Claude Achalle – engineering
- Henri Arcens – engineering
- Jean-Jacques Mahuteau – artwork
- Renaud Marchand – artwork
- Gunther – photography
- Joël Savy – lacquering

== Release history ==
Region	Date	Label	Format	Catalog
France	May 1979	Rockland Records	LP album	900.500 GP347
France	May 1979	Rockland Records	LP album	900.501 GP361
Canada	May 1979	Polydor Records/PolyGram	LP album	2424 903
Germany	May 1979	Warner-Elektra-Atlantic	LP album	58 137
Italy	May 1979	Rockland Records	LP album	RKL 20137
Italy	May 1979	Rockland Records	Compact Cassette	30 RKL 20137
Spain	April 1978	Ariola Records	LP album	200720

== Certifications ==
Region	Certification	Certified units/sales
Italy (FIMI)	Gold	200,000
