= Contempt (novel) =

1954 existential novel

- First edition cover
- Author: Alberto Moravia
- Original title: Il disprezzo
- Translator: Angus Davidson
- Cover artist: Henri Matisse
- Language: Italian
- Genre: Philosophical fiction
- Publisher: Bompiani (1st edition)
- Publication date: 1954
- Publication place: Italy
- English publication date: 1955 (as A Ghost at Noon); 1999 (as Contempt)
- Media type: Print (Hardcover, Paperback); Digital (ebook)
- Pages: 259 (Hardcover, 1st edition)
- ISBN: 1-85375-312-2 (English edition)
- OCLC: 847123426

Contempt (Italian: Il Disprezzo), also known in English as A Ghost At Noon, is an Italian existential novel by Alberto Moravia published in 1954. It was the basis for the 1963 film Le Mépris by Jean-Luc Godard.

== Plot ==
Young Riccardo Molteni, who sees himself as an intellectual writer, does work he despises preparing scripts for distasteful film productions. All this to support his new wife Emilia, the new flat he has taken, the new car he has bought, the maid who cooks and cleans for them and the secretary who comes in to type for him. He believes, even if his work is menial and his income shaky, that he is secure in his wife's love. While he is well educated, able to recite Dante at length, her impoverished family could not afford to educate her and she had to work as a typist.

But the spark has gone out of their marriage and two small incidents trigger its dissolution. First, Emilia catches Riccardo kissing the secretary, a lapse he shrugs off as meaningless. Then the brash producer Battista asks the two of them to his house in Rome. As he has a two-seater car, he takes Emilia, leaving Riccardo to follow by taxi. The taxi breaks down, leaving Emilia alone with Battista. She interprets this as Riccardo rejecting her, offering her to Battista in order to further his career, so she tells him that she now despises him and will sleep alone.

The two are invited to Battista's villa on Capri, where Riccardo will work on the script for a production of The Odyssey. There he sees Battista rip Emilia's dress and kiss her body, while in The Odyssey he sees disturbing parallels to his own unhappy life. In a mood close to suicide, he has a vision by the sea of the loving Emilia he first knew who has come back to be reconciled. Regaining his equilibrium, he returns to the villa to discover that she has been killed in an accident in Battista's car.

== Reception ==
A contemporary reviewer noted how Moravia 'treats a delicate psychological subject' with 'economy of means' by subtly exploring 'fundamental difference of temperament and of intellectual and emotional attitudes in the two partners'. The ending shows 'a sense of reconciliation and acceptance of life … absent from most of his earlier work. Catharsis finally takes place in the protagonist'. Moreover, 'the symbolic superstructure does not detract from the interest of the narration, nor does it slow the pace; it may even remain unperceived by the naive reader'. In conclusion, the book 'passes the test of the successful novel with a high score; it can be read on different levels and the discussion of the Odyssey, fascinating in itself, is not an artificial interruption but an integral and enriching feature of the whole'.

A later review hinted at the fact that living individuals lay behind the principal characters of the book.

In Le Monde's 100 Books of the Century, published in 1999, French readers voted the book the 48th most memorable.
