= Contempt (film) =

1963 film by Jean-Luc Godard

- French theatrical release poster
- French: Le Mépris
- Directed by: Jean-Luc Godard
- Screenplay by: Jean-Luc Godard (uncredited)
- Based on: Il disprezzo 1954 novel by Alberto Moravia
- Produced by: Georges de Beauregard; Carlo Ponti; Uncredited: Joseph E. Levine
- Starring: Brigitte Bardot; Jack Palance; Michel Piccoli; Giorgia Moll; Fritz Lang
- Cinematography: Raoul Coutard
- Edited by: Agnès Guillemot
- Music by: Georges Delerue (France/US); Piero Piccioni (Italy/Spain)
- Production companies: Rome Paris Films; Les Films Concordia; Compagnia Cinematografica Champion
- Distributed by: Marceau-Cocinor (France); Interfilm (Italy)
- Release dates: 29 October 1963 (Italy); 20 December 1963 (France)
- Running time: 101 minutes
- Countries: France; Italy
- Languages: French; English; German; Italian
- Budget: $1 million
- Box office: 1,597,870 admissions (France)

Contempt (French: Le Mépris) is a 1963 French New Wave drama film written and directed by Jean-Luc Godard, based on Alberto Moravia's 1954 novel Il disprezzo. It follows a playwright, Paul Javal, whose marriage begins to fall apart during the troubled production of a film adaptation of Homer's Odyssey. The film stars Brigitte Bardot, Michel Piccoli, Jack Palance, Fritz Lang, and Giorgia Moll. It has been considered one of Godard's major works and one of the greatest and most influential films of all time.

== Plot ==
Paul Javal, a young French playwright who has achieved commercial success in Rome, accepts an offer from Jerry Prokosch, a vulgar American producer, to rework the script for Austrian director Fritz Lang's screen adaptation of the Odyssey.

Paul's wife, Camille Javal, joins him on the first day of the project at Cinecittà. After initial discussions, Prokosch invites the crew to his villa and offers Camille a ride in his two-seat sports car. Camille looks to Paul to decline the offer, but he passively withdraws, opting to follow by taxi instead, leaving Camille alone with Prokosch. Paul does not catch up with them until 30 minutes later, explaining that he was delayed by a traffic accident. Camille grows uneasy, secretly doubting his honesty and suspecting that he is using her to strengthen his ties with Prokosch. Her misgivings deepen when she witnesses Paul groping Prokosch's secretary, Francesca.

Back at their apartment, Paul and Camille discuss the subtle tension that has arisen between them in the first few hours of the project. Camille suddenly announces to her bewildered husband that she no longer loves him.

Hoping to rekindle Camille's affection, Paul convinces her to accept Prokosch's invitation to join them for filming in Capri. Prokosch and Lang are locked in a conflict over the correct interpretation of Homer's work, a stalemate exacerbated by the difficulty of communication between the German director, the French screenwriter, and the American producer. Francesca acts as an interpreter, mediating all conversations. When Paul sides with Prokosch against Lang by suggesting that Odysseus left home because of his wife's infidelity, Camille's suspicions of her husband's servility are confirmed. She deliberately allows Paul to find her in Prokosch's embrace, and in the ensuing confrontation, she implies that her respect for him has turned to contempt because she believes he has bartered her to Prokosch. Paul denies this accusation, offering to sever his ties with the film and leave Capri, but Camille refuses to recant and departs for Rome with the producer.

After a car crash in which Camille and Prokosch are killed, Paul prepares to leave Capri and return to the theater. Lang, meanwhile, continues working on the film.

== Cast ==
- Brigitte Bardot as Camille Javal
- Michel Piccoli as Paul Javal
- Jack Palance as Jeremiah Prokosch
- Giorgia Moll as Francesca Vanini
- Fritz Lang as himself
- Raoul Coutard as the cameraman
- Jean-Luc Godard as Lang's assistant director
- Linda Veras as a Siren

== Production ==
Italian film producer Carlo Ponti approached Godard to discuss a possible collaboration; Godard suggested an adaptation of Moravia's novel Il disprezzo (originally translated into English with the title A Ghost at Noon) in which he saw Kim Novak and Frank Sinatra as the leads; they refused. Ponti suggested Sophia Loren and Marcello Mastroianni, whom Godard refused. Anna Karina (by then Godard's former wife) later revealed that the director had traveled to Rome to ask Monica Vitti if she would portray the female lead. However, the Italian actress reportedly turned up an hour late, "staring out the window like she wasn't interested at all". Finally, Bardot was chosen because of the producer's insistence that the profits might be increased by displaying her famously sensual body. This provided the film's opening scene, filmed by Godard as a typical mockery of the cinema business with tame nudity. The scene was shot after Godard considered the film finished, at the insistence of the American co-producers. In the film, Godard cast himself as Lang's assistant director, and characteristically has Lang expound many of Godard's New Wave theories and opinions. Godard also employed the two "forgotten" New Wave filmmakers, Luc Moullet and Jacques Rozier, on the film. Bardot visibly reads a book about Fritz Lang that was written by Moullet, and Rozier made the documentary short about the making of the film Le Parti des Choses.

Godard admitted to changing the original novel, but with the consent of the original writer, Moravia. Among Godard's changes were focusing the action to only a few days and changing the writer character from being "silly and soft". Godard said, "I've made him more American—something like a Humphrey Bogart type."

Half the film's budget went on Bardot's fee.

=== Filming ===
Contempt was filmed in Italy where it is set, with location shooting at the Cinecittà studios in Rome, and the Casa Malaparte on Capri island. In a sequence, the characters played by Piccoli and Bardot wander through their apartment alternately arguing and reconciling. Godard filmed the scene as an extended series of tracking shots, in natural light and in near real-time. The cinematographer Raoul Coutard also shot some of the other nouvelle vague films, including Godard's Breathless (1960). According to Jonathan Rosenbaum, Godard was also directly influenced by Jean-Daniel Pollet and Volker Schlöndorff's Méditerranée, released earlier the same year.

Godard admitted his tendency to get actors to improvise dialogue "during the peak moment of creation" often baffled them. He said, "They often feel useless". "Yet they bring me a lot ... I need them, just as I need the pulse and colours of real settings for atmosphere and creation."

== Critical reception ==
Variety called it a "slim tale", but noted Bardot "handled her lines well and displays a feel for a scene, and timing and presence scarcely seen in her undraped [pictures] ...Color is good if sometimes overindulged for mood effects. Godard has soft pedaled his penchant for jump cuts but still uses intellectual editing techniques that sometimes jar if they do not mar the general mood and development of the story."

Bosley Crowther of The New York Times called the film "luxuriant", but wrote that Godard "could put his talents to more intelligent and illuminating use"; according to Crowther, who is unclear about the motivations of the main characters, "Mr. Godard has attempted to make this film communicate a sense of the alienation of individuals in this complex modern world. And he has clearly directed to get a tempo that suggests irritation and ennui."

Film critic Roger Ebert wrote that Contempt "is not one of the great Godard films, for reasons it makes clear. In a way, it's about its own shortcomings. ... It is interesting to see, and has moments of brilliance (the marital argument, the use of the villa steps), but its real importance is as a failed experiment. Contempt taught Godard he could not make films like this, and so he included himself out, and went on to make the films he could make."

Filmink wrote: "This film is overrated in our humble opinion, but people really love it; it's certainly worth watching."

Sight & Sound critic Colin MacCabe referred to Contempt as "the greatest work of art produced in postwar Europe".

On the review aggregator website Rotten Tomatoes, the film has an approval rating of 92% based on 66 reviews, with an average score of 8.8/10. The site's critical consensus reads: "This powerful work of essential cinema joins 'meta' with 'physique,' casting Brigitte Bardot and director Godard's inspiration Fritz Lang."

== Legacy ==
French journalist Antoine de Gaudemar made a one-hour documentary in 2009 about Contempt, Il était une fois ... Le Mépris (A Film and Its Era: Contempt), using footage from Jacques Rozier's earlier documentaries Paparazzi (1963), Le Parti des Choses (1964), and André S. Labarthe's Le dinosaure et le bébé (1967).

In 2012, Godard's film ranked 21st on critic's poll and 44th on director's poll in Sight & Sound magazine's 100 greatest films of all time list. In the Sight and Sound 2022 critic's poll, the film was tied for 54th place, while in the director's poll, it was tied for 46th place.

The song "Thème de Camille", which was originally composed for Contempt, is used as a main theme in the 1995 film Casino.

A still from the film was used as the official poster for the 2016 Cannes Film Festival.

In 2018, the film ranked 60th on the BBC's list of the 100 greatest foreign-language films, as voted on by 209 film critics from 43 countries.

== See also ==
- List of films featuring fictional films
