= Galaxy (Rockets album) =

Studio album by Rockets
- Released: 1980
- Genre: Space rock, electronica, synthpop, experimental, ambient
- Label: Rockland Recordings
- Producer: Claude Lemoine

Rockets chronology
Plasteroïd (1979)	Galaxy (1980)	π 3,14 (1981)

Galaxy is a 1980 album by the French band Rockets. The album was recorded at Rockland Studios in Paris, but mixed and mastered in Milan.

== Track listing ==
- All Songs Written By Gérard L'Her & Alain Maratrat, except where noted. (Published By Editions Gavroche)
1. "Galactica" 4:44
2. "Mecanic Bionic" (L'Her, Alain Groetzinger) 4:47
3. "Synthetic Man" 4:51
4. "One More Mission" (L'Her) 4:20
5. "Universal Band" 4:07
6. "Prophecy" (Maratrat) 3:30
7. "In the Black Hole" (L'Her) 6:00
8. "In the Galaxy" 5:10
9. "Medley" 2:30

== Personnel ==
- Christian LeBartz - Lead Vocals
- Alain Maratrat - Electric Guitar, Keyboards, Backing Vocals
- Fabrice Quagliotti - Keyboards, Synthesizers
- Gérard L'Her - Bass, Backing Vocals
- Alain Groetzinger - Drums, Percussion

== Charts ==
Annual chart rankings for Attila
Chart (1980)	Rank
Italian Albums (Musica e dischi)	12

== Certifications ==
Certifications and sales for Galaxy
Region	Certification	Certified units/sales
Italy (FIMI)	Platinum	1,000,000
