= Emotional Decompression Chamber =

Album by Digitalis Purpurea

Studio album by Digitalis Purpurea
- Released: November 12, 2010
- Genre: Industrial Metal
- Length: 47' 49"
- Labels: Aural Music, Dreamcell11
- Producer: Pi Greco

Emotional Decompression Chamber released with "Dreamcell_11/Aural Music" is the second full-length album of the Italian industrial metal band Digitalis Purpurea. It was released on November 12, 2010 with a worldwide distribution.

== Themes and lyrics ==
This album can be defined as a cinematic record because of the combination between sounds and images set as its keystone. The protagonists of the lyrics, Junichiro and Ishtar, are a modern version of Fando y Lis (first work of Alejandro Jodorowsky) chasing the legendary city called Tar on a David Lynch’s Lost Highway. The sound is the soundtrack to this imaginary film.

The presence of electro-clash beats, lysergic desert rock guitars and the unusual use of the voice sometimes played from a busted gramophone give a decadent sound, in which the figures appear faded and where the substance is tinged with noir and the mind is lost forfeited in a thick consistency sensory tunnel where the end is distant and blurred. The voice is used as an instrument that fits the metric and the tone with the mood of the texts. Pi Greco explored the research on the voice of Demetrio Stratos and the cut-up method of William Burroughs. Puns and variations of the pronunciation are used to create a grotesque effect and to reveal hidden words or concepts: there are dialogues hidden in the mix and hidden messages encrypted in the playing time of songs.

== Artwork ==
The artwork sees again the collaboration with the graphic artist and photographer Anna Taschini. The theme is inspired by the film Fando y Lis of Alejandro Jodorowsky, particularly to the first scene where Lis is eating a white rose and the scenes set in the desert.

== Track listing ==
All songs written by Pi Greco.

1. "Musclebound" - 3:39
2. "Dust Devil" - 3:03
3. "Magic Cube" - 5:05
4. "The Shedding" - 5:53
5. "Fall of Rimmel" - 4:43
6. "Blear" - 7:02
7. "Scotch-Taped Hours" - 3:48
8. "Horror Pleni" - 4:40
9. "Devote" - 4:17
10. "Venus Eclipse" - 5:39

== Personnel ==
Digitalis Purpurea

- Pi Greco – Vocals, Guitar, Bass guitar, Synthesizer, Drum machine, Songwriter, Producer

Production

- Victor Love from Dope Stars Inc. - Mix and mastering
- Miss Pussyfoot - Female vocals on "The Fall of Rimmel" and "Horror Pleni"
- Anna Lucylle Taschini - Graphic Design, cover photography
- Tenshi Diamond - Cover model
