= Don't Stop (Rockets album) =

Studio album by Rockets
- Released: 2003
- Recorded: 2000–2002
- Studio: In Jtcompany, Nuzzi Studio, Lucato Studio, Italy
- Genre: Space rock, electronica, synthpop, experimental, ambient
- Length: 46:54
- Label: Dream Beat, Sony Music
- Producer: Fabrice Quagliotti, Joe T. Vannelli

Rockets chronology
Another Future (1992)	Don't Stop (2003)	Kaos (2014)

Don't Stop is the tenth studio album by the French band Rockets. The album, however, includes 4 old hits remixes, and the title track is inspired by a 1982 song which was supposed to be included on the album Atomic, but eventually discarded.

== Track listing ==
1. "Don't Stop"
2. "Rockets Land"
3. "One Day"
4. "On the Road Again"
5. "Communication"
6. "Electric Delight"
7. "Endless Blue"
8. "Galactica"
9. "Astral World"
10. "Moon Walk"

== Personnel ==
=== Rockets ===
- Fabrice Quagliotti - keyboards, synth, production, vocals (5, 7)
- Little B. - drums (1, 2), percussion (6)

=== Additional musicians ===
- Christian Le Bartz - vocals (4, 6, 8, 9)
- Matt Rossato - electric acoustic guitar (1, 5)
- Pino Di Pietro - guitars (4, 8, keyboards (1, 4, 7, 8)
- Alessandro Granata - keyboards (1, 3)
- Alain Groetzinger - artistic contribution (1)
- Sebastian Mauro - electronic drums (7), bass (7), engineering (1, 7)
- Joe T. Vannelli - drums (2, 3, 7), bass (2, 4, 7, 8), keyboards (2), groove percussions (4, 8), production, mixing
- Andrea Bertolini - drums (2, bass (2, 4, 8), keyboards (2), groove percussions (4, 8), engineering (1, 2, 4, 8), mixing (1–4, 6–8)
- Gianni Nuzzi - synth (2, 10), programming (2, 10), computer drums machine programming (5), sequencer (2, 5, 10)
- Anna Venturas - lyric voice (3, 7)
- Silvano Del Gado - live percussions (4, 8)
- Louis K - mixing (9)
