= Karl Heinz Schäfer =

German-born composer and arranger

Karl Heinz Schäfer (17 March 1932 – 12 October 1996) was a German-born composer and arranger who worked mainly in France.

== Life and career ==
Born in Frankfurt to Jewish parents, he moved with his mother during World War II to the United States, where he learned piano and flute. He returned to Europe to study philosophy and linguistics at Heidelberg University, and settled in Paris, France, in the early 1950s. He was a student of Olivier Messiaen at the Conservatoire de Paris, and in the evenings played piano in nightclubs, where he worked for a while as an accompanist to Stan Getz. He then spent time touring American military bases, and developed a taste for Arabic and Indian music.

From the 1960s, he worked as an arranger in the French recording industry, for singers including Adamo and Charles Aznavour, and the band Rockets, and started working with Michel Magne on film soundtracks. He worked on many soundtracks in the 1970s, notably including László Szabó's obscure 1973 film Les Gants Blancs du Diable, which has been reissued and excerpts from which have been included in later compilations of French music. Other soundtracks to which he contributed included Tender Dracula (1974), Zig Zig (1975), L'Empreinte des géants (1980), Extérieur, Nuit (1980), Polar (1984), and Street of No Return (1989). After 1980, he worked closely with filmmaker Patrick Schulmann and musician Jean-Louis Bucchi.

Schäfer died in 1996, aged 62.
