= Jacques Rozier =

French film director and screenwriter (1926–2023)

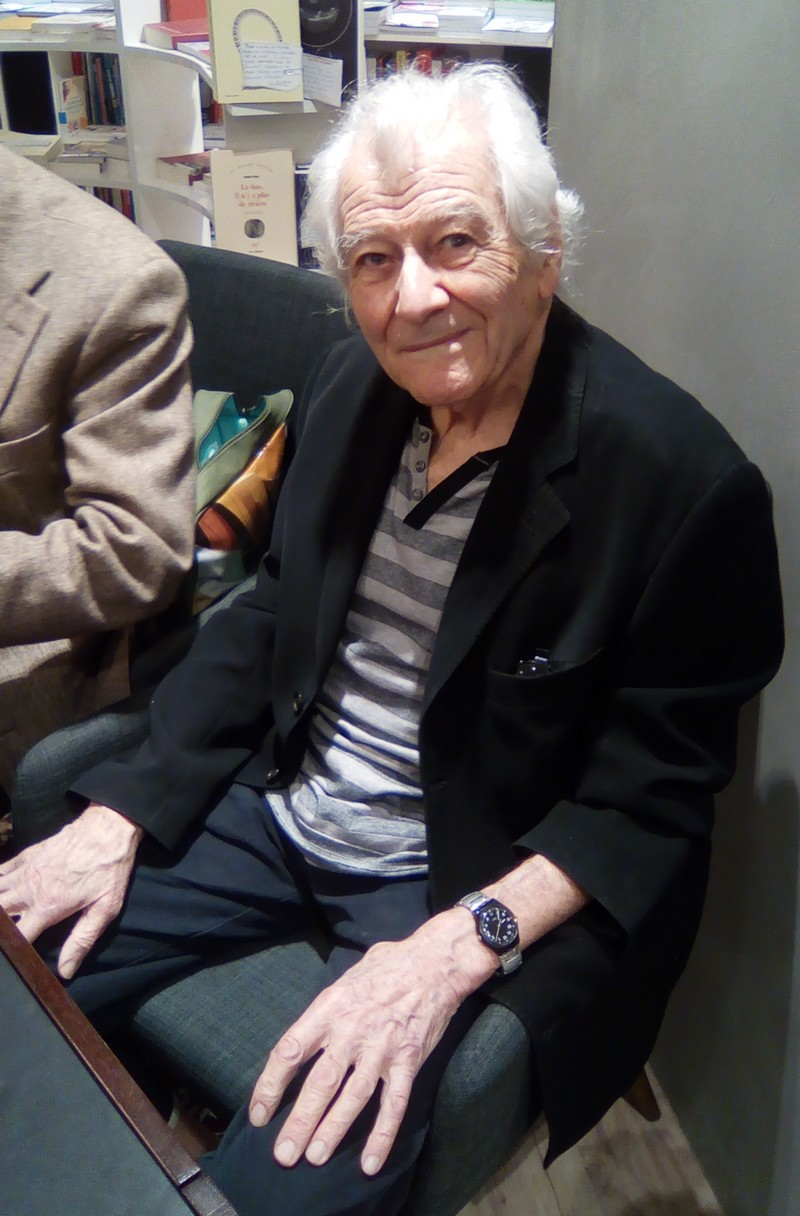
- Rozier in 2017
- Born: 10 November 1926; Paris, France
- Died: 31 May 2023 (aged 96); Théoule-sur-Mer, France
- Education: Institut des hautes études cinématographiques
- Occupation: Filmmaker
- Years active: 1947–2001
- Movement: French New Wave
- Spouse: Michèle O'Glor (divorced)
- Children: 1

Jacques Rozier (French: [ʒak ʁozje]; 10 November 1926 – 31 May 2023) was a French film director and screenwriter. He was one of the lesser-known members of the French New Wave movement and has collaborated with Jean-Luc Godard. Three of his films have been screened at the Cannes Film Festival. In 1978, he was a member of the jury at the 28th Berlin International Film Festival.

== Life ==
Rozier was born in Paris on 10 November 1926. He attended the Institut des hautes études cinématographiques (IDHEC) and began his career in television. His first film, Adieu Philippine, was released in 1962. It was particularly embraced by Cahiers du Cinéma and influenced the New Wave filmmakers who emerged from the magazine's staff.

While Rozier's films were acclaimed by critics and filmmakers, and he worked into his seventies, he never became as famous as some of the other New Wave directors. The New Yorker dubbed him the "odd man out" among the movement.

In 2019, Jean-Luc Godard said that he and Rozier were the last two New Wave filmmakers alive, following the death of Agnès Varda. Godard died in 2022 and Rozier died the following year, at the age of 96. He died in Théoule-sur-Mer on 31 May 2023, at the age of 96.

A marriage to Michèle O'Glor ended in divorce. They had a son who died in 2022.

== Filmography ==
=== Features ===
- 1962 Adieu Philippine
- 1973 Du Côté d'Orouët
- 1976 The Castaways of Turtle Island
- 1985 Maine-Ocean Express, awarded the Prix Jean Vigo for 1986
- 2001 Fifi Martingale

=== Shorts ===
- Rentrée des classes (1956)
- Blue Jeans (1958)
- Dans Le Vent (1962)
- Paparazzi (1963)
- Le Parti des choses (1963)
- Nono Nénesse (1976)
- Lettre de la Sierra Morena (1983)
- Comment devenir cinéaste sans se prendre la tête (1995)

=== TV work ===
- Jean Vigo (episode of Cinéastes de notre temps) (1964)
- Ni figue ni raisin (1964)
- Revenez plaisirs exilés ! (Alceste) (1992)
- Joséphine en tournée (1990)
- Lettre d'un cinéaste : Jacques Rozier (episode of Cinéma cinémas) (1983)
