= On the Road Again (Rockets album) =

Studio album by Rockets
- Released: April 1978
- Recorded: 1977–1978 at Studio Société Française Du Son, Paris
- Genre: Space rock, electronica, synthpop, experimental, ambient
- Length: 35:01
- Label: IPG
- Producer: Claude Lemoine

Rockets chronology
Rockets (1976)	On the Road Again (1978)	Sound of the Future (1979)

On the Road Again is the second studio album by French space rock band Rockets, released in April 1978.

== Track listing ==
No.	Title	Writer(s)	Length
1.	"On the Road Again" (Canned Heat cover)	Alan Wilson, Floyd Jones	8:50
2.	"Cosmic Race"	Gerard L'Her	4:15
3.	"Venus Rapsody"	Alain Maratrat	4:18
4.	"Space Rock"	Rockets	4:00
5.	"Astrolights"	Maratrat	6:10
6.	"Electro-Voice"	Alain Groetzinger	2:48
7.	"Sci Fi Boogie"	Christian Le Bartz, L'Her	4:40
Total length:			35:01

United States edition
No.	Title	Writer(s)	Length
1.	"On the Road Again" (Canned Heat cover)	Wilson, Jones	8:33
2.	"Space Rock"	Rockets	8:20
3.	"Electro-Voice"	Groetzinger	2:48
4.	"Astrolights"	Maratrat	6:10
5.	"Sci Fi Boogie"	Le Bartz, L'Her	4:40
6.	"Cosmic Race"	L'Her	4:14
7.	"Venus Rapsody"	Maratrat	4:18
Total length:			39:03

== Personnel ==
Rockets

- Christian Le Bartz – vocals
- "Little" Gerard L'Her – bass, vocals; keyboards on "Cosmic Race"
- Alain Maratrat – guitar, keyboards; vocals on "Space Rock"; synthesizers on "Astrolights" and "Electro-Voice"
- Fabrice Quagliotti – keyboards
- Alain Groetzinger – drums, percussion

Additional personnel

- Claude Lemoine – production
- Henri Arcens – engineering
- Karl Heinz Schäfer – arrangements, vocals on "Futur Woman"
- Zeus B. Held – vocoder on "On the Road Again"
- Guido Harari – photography
- Georges Spitzer – photography
- Bruno Marzi – photography
- Tom Moulton – mixing on "On the Road Again"

== Release history ==
Region	Date	Label	Format	Catalog
France	April 1978	Decca Records/IPG Records	LP album	170.008
Australia	April 1978	RCA Records/Victor Records	LP album	VPL1-4110
Australia	April 1978	RCA Records/Victor Records	Compact Cassette	VPL1-4110
Canada	April 1978	Polydor Records	LP album	2424 180
Germany	April 1978	Ariola-Montana	LP album	200 205-320
Italy	April 1978	Derby Records/CGD Records	LP album	DBR 20014
Italy	April 1978	Derby Records/CGD Records	Compact Cassette	DBR 20014
Spain	April 1978	Ariola-Eurodisc	LP album	26056.I
Sweden	April 1978	Sonet Records	LP album	SLP 3037
United States	April 1978	Tom n' Jerry Records	LP album	TA 4704 0798

== Certifications ==
Region	Certification	Certified units/sales
Italy (FIMI)	Gold	100,000
