= Digitalis Purpurea (musician) =

Italian musician and producer

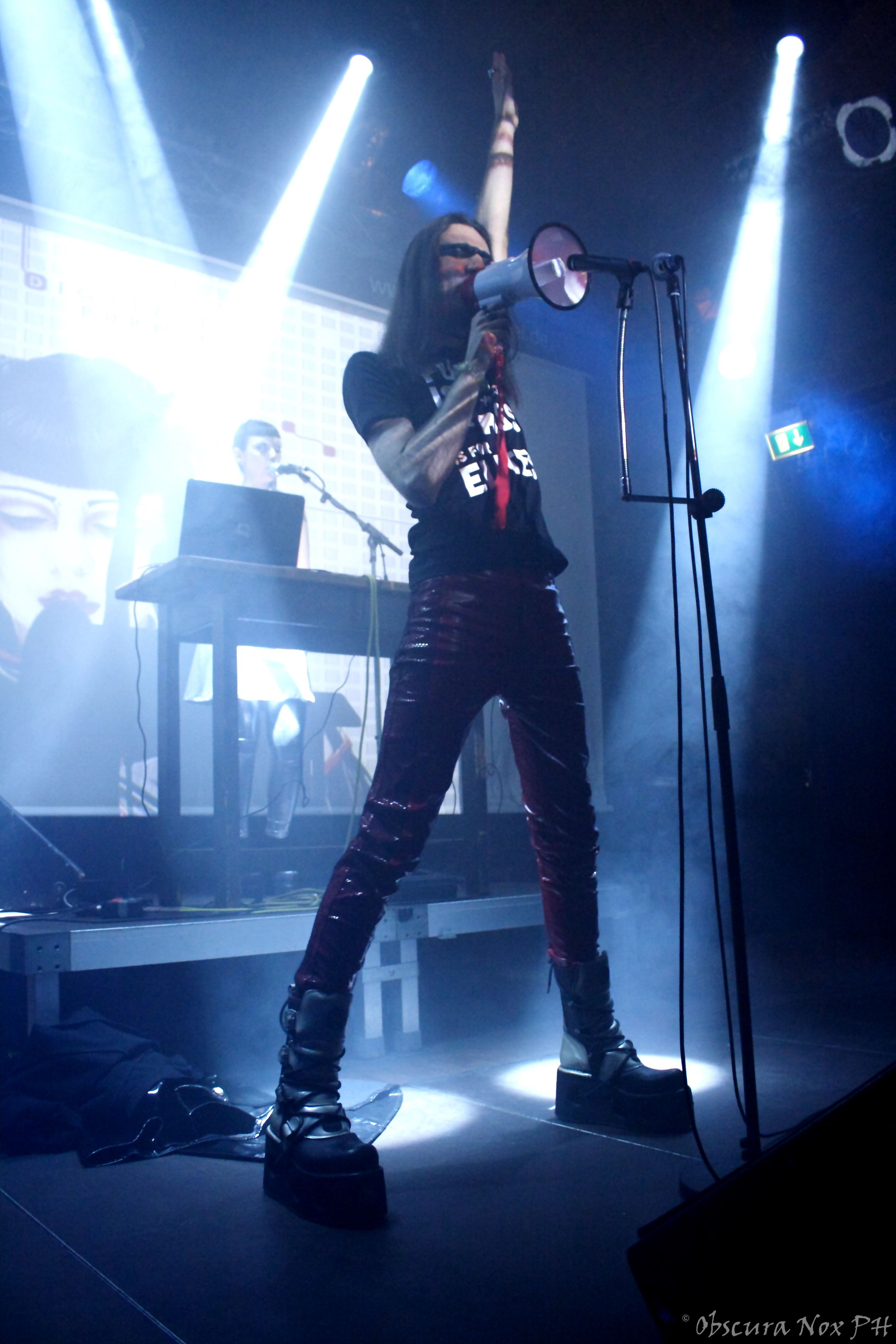

Background information
- Origin: Turin, Italy
- Genres: Industrial, soundtrack, industrial metal, industrial rock, electro industrial, electronica, glam rock
- Occupations: Musician, music producer, songwriter, DJ
- Instruments: Vocals, bass, guitar, computer, sequencer, synthesizer
- Years active: 2000–present
- Labels: Danse Macabre, Aural Music, Dreamcell11, Subalpina Industry
- Members: Cris Gutter

Cris Gutter, also known as Cristian Pi Greco, is an Italian electronic music producer and artist. He is best known as the founder and sole member of the electro-industrial project Digitalis Purpurea. Digitalis Purpurea has released several EPs and full-length albums, and has performed at various clubs and festivals across Europe. He has also collaborated with other artists, including Ted Jensen, Danny Saber, Matthew Setzer, Bruno Kramm, and Fabri Fibra.

In 2016, Digitalis Purpurea released an EP entitled Pastel Dissonances which included the single "The Mesmeric Lights Of Vegas". The single was also featured in Zvuková Vlna XII, a compilation album of contemporary Italian artists.

In 2018, Digitalis Purpurea released the maxi-single "Maneater" which was produced in collaboration with Keith Hillebrandt (notable for his work with Nine Inch Nails, David Bowie, and 12 Rounds) and Fabrizio Giannese of Italian band Aborym. The single was included in the soundtrack for the 2020 Italian film, Quid.

== Discography ==
- 2003 – Pi Squad – Demo Cd, Crypto Records
- 2004 – 19 Celebrations in 19 Mutilations – EP Crypto Records
- 2008 – Aseptic White – Full-length, "Dreamcell_11/Aural Music"
- 2010 – Emotional Decompression Chamber – Full-length, "Dreamcell_11/Aural Music"
- 2012 – 30-hole and Fred Perry – EP, "Danse Macabre Records (Germany)"
- 2014 – Palindrome Shapes of Mold – Full-length, "Danse Macabre Records (Germany)"
- 2016 – Pastel Dissonances – EP, "Subalpina Industry"
- 2017 – AnnA (La sua bellezza trasfigurata attraverso un bicchiere di J&B) – Full-length, "Subalpina Industry"
- 2017 – Intervallo – EP, "Subalpina Industry"
- 2018 – Maneater (Industrial Rock Version) – Single, "Subalpina Industry"
- 2020 – Specchio (EP)

== Contributions and remixes ==
- 2005 – IBM (Italian Body Music) Vol.2
- 2007 – Gears of Industry (split cd)
- 2010 – Fuck 'em All Vol.7
- 2011 – The Bizarre Remixes (split cd w/No Forgiveness)
- 2012 – Sonic Seducer _ Cold Hands Seduction Vol.130
- 2013 – Dunkle Frequenzen Vol.01
- 2013 – Die Antwoord vs Digitalis Purpurea _Dis Iz Why I'm Hot (BitBabol Mixxx)
- 2013 – Helalyn Flowers _White Me in Black Me Out [REMIX / Alfa Matrix]
- 2013 – TheDubSync P.O.T. feat Fabri Fibra [REMIX / Elastica Records]
- 2015 – Face The Beat: Session 3 [Side-Line Magazine]
- 2016 – Zvuková Vlna XII
