= Sanguis et Cinis =

Austrian gothic rock band

- Origin: Austria
- Genres: Neue Deutsche Todeskunst, gothic rock, alternative rock
- Years active: 1994–2007, 2013, 2014, 2019
- Members: Eve Evangel; Celine Cecilia Angel; Phil Chains; Dushi; Loco
- Past members: Ashley Dayour; Richard Lederer
- Website: sanguisetcinis.com

Sanguis et Cinis (Latin: Blood and Ashes) was an Austrian gothic rock band.

== History ==
In 1994, Eve Evangel met Ashley Dayour and they started Sanguis et Cinis. Their first show went badly, and it wasn't until Richard Lederer joined them in 1995 for a show in Vienna that they clicked as a band. Together, they wrote and recorded a number of songs, including Schicksalswölfe and Gedankensplitter, which they put onto their first demo tape, Requiem 1791. In 1996, they released their first album, Schicksal, which garnered enough attention for them to be signed to MOS Records. Eve wanted some changes to the band's look, and added Celine Cecila Angel to the line-up. Arthur joined, and Ashley Dayour left to start another band. After the band recorded unfreiwillig abstrakt in 1997, Richard left to concentrate on his three other projects. Sanguis et Cinis continued as a trio with successful shows in Germany, Portugal, Italy and Austria as well as tours in Mexico, South-Africa, Russia, the U.S.A, they also played in various festivals with bands like Diva Desctrution, Noctivagus, whitin Temptation for example. In 2003, they were featured on the cover of the September issue of the German darkwave magazine Orkus They disbanded in 2007, and Eve Evangel went on to found the band Lolita KompleX.

On December 25, 2013 Sanguis et Cinis played a worldwide exclusive reunion show in Leipzig together with fellow 1990s Goth act Illuminate on personal request of the band.

In April 2014 Sanguis et Cinis announced that they will be doing another worldwide exclusive reunion show for their fans in Mexico. 11 year after their last Mexico tour and 12 years after their last show in Mexico City they announced to play in Mexico City on May 3, 2014.

On April 1, 2019 they announced they'd be doing a worldwide exclusive reunion show at the Wave Gotik Treffen to commemorate their show at the same festival in 1999.

== Musical style ==
In the mid-1990s, Sanguis et Cinis was associated mostly with Neue Deutsche Todeskunst, but later they were also classified as Alternative Rock and Gothic Rock. The music of Sanguis et Cinis has always been heavily associated with the German and Austrian Goth scene.

== Discography ==
=== Albums ===
- 1996: Schicksal
- 1998: ...Wie der unberührte Traum einer Jungfrau
- 1999: Madrigal
- 1999: Madrigal/InSeCt (2-CD set)
- 2000: Amnesia
- 2002: Alright. Let's Rock!
- 2003: TH1RTE3N

=== Demos ===
- 1995: Requiem 1791
- 1995: Sanguis et Cinis
- 1996: Collection 93-95

=== Compilations ===
- 2000: Tragic Years - A Collection Of Early Releases & More
- 2000: Best Of (für Mexiko)

=== Singles ===
- 1997: "Unfreiwillig Abstrakt"
- 1998: "Fremde Federn"
- 2002: "Not Gonna..."

=== Videos ===
- 1997: Das Siegel (VHS)
