= List of A Series of Unfortunate Events characters =

The children's novel series A Series of Unfortunate Events and its film and television adaptations features a large cast of characters created by Daniel Handler under the pen name of Lemony Snicket. The original series follows the turbulent lives of the Baudelaire orphans, Violet, Klaus, and Sunny, after their parents are killed in an arsonous structure fire. It chronicles their multiple escapes from the murderous Count Olaf, and their discoveries of a connection of between both their late parents and Olaf and a secret organization called V.F.D.

The author himself is also a character, playing a major role in the plot. Although the series is given no distinct location, other real people appear in the narrative, including the series' illustrator, Brett Helquist, and Daniel Handler himself.

== Main characters ==
=== Count Olaf ===
Count Olaf
- A Series of Unfortunate Events character
- First appearance: The Bad Beginning (1999)
- Last appearance: The End (2006)
- Portrayed by: Jim Carrey (film and video game); Neil Patrick Harris (TV series)
- Aliases: Yessica Haircut; Al Funcoot; Stephano; Captain Julio Sham; Shirley St. Ives; Coach Genghis; Gunther; Detective Dupin; Dr. Mattathias Medical School; Kit Snicket
- Occupation: Impressario, arsonist

Count Olaf is the franchise's main antagonist and one of the primary characters. His name was chosen to suggest Scandinavian origin to add confusion and ambiguity about the setting of the series. He claims to be a distant relative of the Baudelaires, either their third cousin four times removed, or their fourth cousin three times removed. Olaf is a failing actor (though he claimed to have been considered for major acting awards) and is after the Baudelaire fortune. He and his acting troupe follow the children with dogged determination to kill them and obtain their inheritance. He is known for his one eyebrow, gleaming eyes, and V.F.D. insignia tattoo, shaped like an eye, on his left ankle. He was suspected by the children of having killed their parents, though he denied having done so when they accused him.

He was once part of the secret organization of V.F.D. (Volunteer Fire Department) before helping to instigate a schism that split its members. He joined the fire-starting side of the organization and was known to have committed a wide assortment of arsons, among numerous other crimes, in his thirst to destroy the organization and gain revenge over his former comrades.

In the 2004 film and its video game adaptation, Olaf was portrayed by Jim Carrey with additional dialogue being provided by Robin Atkin Downes in the video game adaption. Unlike in the books, Count Olaf loses custody of the Baudelaires after Mr. Poe sees that he "let Sunny drive" after a failed attempt to get them run over by a train. He does redeem himself to Mr. Poe when he rescues the Baudelaires from the Lachrymose Leeches which leads up to his plot that involved "The Marvelous Marriage". When Count Olaf's plot is exposed, everyone in the audience converges on Count Olaf as the constable arrests him. Although the judge decrees that Count Olaf be made to suffer every hardship he inflicted on the children before serving a life sentence, Count Olaf vanishes after a jury of his peers overturns his sentence. A deleted scene of the film has him lifted by his acting troupe with a rope where he flees and swears he'll have the Baudelaire fortune. Count Olaf escapes in the video game adaptation when the lights go out.

In the 2017 TV series, he is portrayed by Neil Patrick Harris. In flashbacks, it is shown that Count Olaf was engaged to Kit Snicket, his father was the chief of the city's official fire department, and his mother had died in a fire. His father was accidentally killed one night at the opera by a poison dart thrown by Beatrice Baudelaire that was meant for Esmé Squalor. As a result, he swore vengeance on Beatrice and the entire V.F.D. After some time wandering underground, Count Olaf was mentored by the Man with a Beard But No Hair and the Woman with Hair But No Beard.

=== Baudelaire Children ===
The Baudelaire siblings, Violet, Klaus and Sunny, are the main protagonists and three of the primary characters of the series. They are all described as "intelligent, charming, resourceful, and [having] pleasant facial features". The series begins with the siblings finding out their parents have died in a house fire and then proceeds to follow their tumultuous lives as they go from guardian to guardian with Count Olaf at their heels, attempting to get his hands on their fortune. Over the course of the series, the Baudelaire siblings are forced to perform immoral acts, such as lying, stealing and arson, demonstrating one of the central themes of the series: the lack of clear division between 'good' and 'evil'. Snicket also explores this theme in All the Wrong Questions.

The name Baudelaire was taken from the French poet Charles Baudelaire. One of his most famous works, Les Fleurs du mal, discusses finding beauty in otherwise grim circumstances. The names of the Baudelaire siblings themselves were taken from a variety of backgrounds to add confusion and ambiguity about the setting of the series. Violet was chosen because it sounded British, while Klaus and Sunny sounded German and American, respectively. The Baudelaire siblings all have fast-acting peppermint allergies. Daniel Handler has confirmed that the Baudelaires are Jewish, but whether they are ethnically and/or religiously Jewish is not stated. Klaus and Sunny's name may have been inspired by the real story of Claus von Bülow, a businessman in New York, who was accused of attempting to murder his wife, Sunny von Bülow.

==== Violet Baudelaire ====
Violet Baudelaire
- A Series of Unfortunate Events character
- First appearance: The Bad Beginning (1999)
- Last appearance: The End (2006)
- Portrayed by: Emily Browning (film); Malina Weissman (TV Series)
- Aliases: Veronica (by The Daily Punctilio); Laura V. Bleediotie; Beverly, The Two Headed Freak
- Family: Bertrand Baudelaire (father); Beatrice Baudelaire (mother); Klaus Baudelaire (brother); Sunny Baudelaire (sister)

Violet Baudelaire is the eldest of the three Baudelaire orphans, as well as the daughter of Beatrice and Bertrand Baudelaire and is uniquely gifted in inventing abilities. She uses these skills to help her younger brother Klaus and her baby sister Sunny escape from Count Olaf time and time again. Violet is fourteen at the beginning of the series and turns fifteen in The Grim Grotto, and is sixteen upon leaving the Island in the last chapter of The End.

Being the eldest Baudelaire, she is set to inherit the Baudelaire fortune upon turning eighteen. Brett Helquist's drawings indicate she has long, dark brown hair, and though her eye color is never specified, it is implied that her eyes are a different color than Klaus, who has brown eyes. When thinking and concentrating on new inventions, Violet ties her hair in a purple ribbon to keep it out of her face. It is also said that she hates the colour pink. When Violet was five years old, she won an invention contest with an "automatic rolling pin", which she made using a window shade and six pairs of roller skates. Violet also invented a new kind of pencil sharpener, built a telephone from scratch, and created a device to soothe Sunny's teething pains.

In the film and video game adaption, Violet is portrayed by Emily Browning.

In the TV series, Violet is portrayed by Malina Weissman.

==== Klaus Baudelaire ====
Klaus Baudelaire
- A Series of Unfortunate Events character
- First appearance: The Bad Beginning (1999)
- Last appearance: The End (2006)
- Portrayed by: Liam Aiken (film); Louis Hynes (TV Series)
- Aliases: Klyde (by The Daily Punctilio); Dr Tocuna; Elliot, The Two Headed Freak
- Family: Bertrand Baudelaire (father); Beatrice Baudelaire (mother); Violet Baudelaire (sister); Sunny Baudelaire (sister)

Klaus Baudelaire is the middle of the Baudelaire siblings. He is a gifted reader and had read most of the books in the Baudelaire library before it burned down. His love of reading and research skills are often useful for foiling Count Olaf's plans. Klaus is twelve at the beginning of the series, turned thirteen while incarcerated for a brief period of time in The Vile Village, and fourteen by the last chapter of The End. Klaus is bespectacled in the books and TV series but not in the film adaptation. He has black hair and brown eyes. Herman Melville is one of his favorite authors (Unlike Edgar Guest, who is his least favorite poet). He particularly enjoys "the way Melville dramatizes the plight of overlooked people, such as poor sailors or youngster, through his strange, often experimental philosophical prose", which sums up the theme of the series.

In the film and video game adaption, Klaus is portrayed by Liam Aiken.

In the TV series, Klaus is portrayed by Louis Hynes.

==== Sunny Baudelaire ====
Sunny Baudelaire
- A Series of Unfortunate Events character
- First appearance: The Bad Beginning (1999)
- Last appearance: The End (2006)
- Portrayed by: Kara Hoffman, Shelby Hoffman (film); Presley Smith (TV Series); Tara Strong (TV Series voice, Seasons 1-2)
- Aliases: Suzie (by The Daily Punctilio); Nurse Flo; Chabo the Wolf Baby
- Family: Bertrand Baudelaire (father); Beatrice Baudelaire (mother); Violet Baudelaire (sister); Klaus Baudelaire (brother)

Sunny Baudelaire is the youngest of the three Baudelaire orphans and is described as an infant through much of the series, although her exact age is never specified. Although Sunny cannot walk until the end of the seventh book and speaks in idiosyncratic baby talk, she repeatedly demonstrates advanced problem solving skills, motor dexterity, comprehension, moral reasoning, and intelligence. She does, however have an expansive vocabulary of non-English words that can be translated by Violet, Klaus, and, occasionally, Lemony Snicket who despite giving meanings to most of Sunny's early language, chooses to define the words as "meaning something like" rather than meaning an exact word or phrase. According to The Miserable Mill, one of her favourite words is "Aha!". By the last chapter of The End, she is speaking in full sentences.

Sunny is frequently noted for strength of her teeth. While Violet and Klaus often use their respective talents of inventing and reading to solve their problems, Sunny is required on multiple occasions to use her sharp teeth. As the books progress, Sunny grows out of infancy and develops a love for cooking.

In the film, Sunny is portrayed by Kara Hoffman and Shelby Hoffman.

In the TV series, Sunny is portrayed by Presley Smith where her voice in the first two seasons was provided by Tara Strong.

=== Lemony Snicket ===
Lemony Snicket is the pen name of the American author Daniel Handler. Lemony is the in-universe author and narrator of the book series chronicling the lives of the Baudelaire children. Over the course of the series, it is revealed that Lemony has two other siblings, Jacques and Kit Snicket. All three siblings were inducted into V.F.D. at an early age and some of Lemony's childhood work for the organization is described in the series All the Wrong Questions.

For Beatrice--
My love for you shall live forever.
You, however, did not.

— Lemony Snicket, Dedication in The Reptile Room

Over the course of the series, it is also revealed Lemony was in love with and even engaged to the Baudelaires' mother, Beatrice Baudelaire. Their relationship came to an end when Lemony was falsely accused of murder and arson, forcing Lemony to eventually fake his death. Nevertheless, he always loved Beatrice and, after learning of her death, dedicated his life to documenting the lives of her children.

In the 2004 film, Lemony Snicket is voiced by Jude Law; he is shown in silhouette writing the story on a typewriter inside a clock tower. In the video game adaptation and the multi-cast audiobook, he is voiced by Tim Curry.

In the 2017 TV series, he is portrayed by Patrick Warburton who appears as the onscreen narrator.

== Supporting characters ==
=== Arthur Poe ===
Arthur Poe
- A Series of Unfortunate Events character
- First appearance: The Bad Beginning (1999)
- Last appearance: The Penultimate Peril (2005)
- Portrayed by: Timothy Spall (Film); Daniel Hagen (Video game); K. Todd Freeman (TV Series)
- Occupation: Banker
- Family: Edgar Poe (Son); Albert Poe (Son); Eleanora Poe (Sister); Polly Poe (Wife)

Arthur Poe is a banker at Mulctuary Money Management in charge of the Baudelaire and Quagmire fortunes and the Baudelaire orphans' guardianship. He is distinguished by a congenital cough, purblind demeanour, and general inefficacy in caring for the Baudelaire and Quagmire children. Poe is the first to bring the news of Bertrand and Beatrice's death to the Baudelaire children who were at Briny Beach. As executor of the Baudelaire estate, he interprets the will's instructions that the children "be raised in the most convenient way possible", meaning they should remain within the city limits, and arranges for their distant relative Count Olaf to take custody. When the Baudelaires contact Poe at Mulctuary Money Management to report Olaf's abuse, the banker points out that Olaf is acting in loco parentis, and can raise them as he sees fit. However, when Olaf traps Sunny in a birdcage and attempts to force Violet to marry him during the play while exposing his plot, Poe invokes citizen's arrest just prior to Count Olaf's escape.

Since then, Arthur Poe tries to find a suitable guardian to watch over the kids although is often quite unhelpful. The Baudelaires are unable to contact him after the events of The Vile Village. However, Poe is one of the few people to maintain the Baudelaires' innocence.

In the 2004 film, Arthur Poe drives a Tatra 603 and is portrayed by Timothy Spall. In the video game adaptation, he is voiced by Daniel Hagen.

In the 2017 TV series, he is portrayed by K. Todd Freeman.

=== Baudelaire family members ===
==== Beatrice Baudelaire ====
Beatrice Baudelaire was the wife of Bertrand Baudelaire and the mother of Violet, Klaus and Sunny Baudelaire. She is known to have been an actress, a lion-tamer and a "baticeer" (bat trainer). Lemony Snicket was in love with Beatrice and they almost got married, but Beatrice married Bertrand instead, supposedly because she believed that Lemony was dead after his obituary appeared in The Daily Punctilio newspaper. Besides this, various other hints are dispensed throughout the series as to why she called off the marriage. Since then, there have been many theories about it. Lemony had dedicated all the books in A Series of Unfortunate Events to Beatrice, however, the reader does not learn that she is actually the Baudelaires' mother until the final book.

According to Lemony Snicket: The Unauthorized Autobiography, Snicket was at one point mistakenly reported by the notoriously inaccurate Daily Punctilio as dead.

In The Grim Grotto, Lemony makes reference to Captain Widdershins's having convinced Beatrice that a story in a newspaper was true, which could be the report of his death. The other evidence for her belief was that she had planned to name Violet 'Lemony' had she been a boy, in accordance with the family custom of naming a child after a dead friend. We can assume that Beatrice at one time believed that Snicket was dead. When Lemony was revealed to be alive, she had already married Bertrand and she could not marry him.

However, in The Beatrice Letters, the reader is told that Beatrice returned Lemony's engagement ring and sent him a 200-page book explaining why the two could not be wed, something she could not have done had she believed Snicket to be dead. However, this may have been after he was revealed to be alive.

This may contradict Ishmael's statement from The End that the ring was given to Beatrice then back to Lemony to Kit to Bertrand then back to Beatrice. Also, the newspaper article mentions Lemony's work as the biographer of the Baudelaires, so this particular article could not have been published until after Beatrice's death, which puts a damper on the idea that she read that particular article. She could, of course, have believed a completely different article about him (perhaps one accusing him of crimes he did not commit—Snicket makes frequent references to such articles and false information), sent him the book and the letter, then later when she had married Bertrand, discovered the truth and also believed him (for a time at least) to be dead for some reason—though again, it could not be the obituary that appears in the Daily Punctilio that convinces her of this, as that must appear after her death. When Kit Snicket nears death, she informs the Baudelaire children that "their families have always been close, even if they had to stay apart from one another".

In the 2004 film, Beatrice is portrayed in an uncredited cameo by Helena Bonham Carter.

In the 2017 TV series, Beatrice is portrayed by an unknown extra in season one and by Morena Baccarin in season three. A flashback in "The Carnivorous Carnival" had Lemony running to warn Beatrice that Count Olaf is after her. Count Olaf's attempt on Beatrice's life is revealed to have failed. In a flashback in "The Penultimate Peril" Pt. 2, Beatrice accidentally killed Count Olaf's father with a dart that was meant for Esmé Squalor after she and her ex-fiancé Lemony Snicket steal Esmé's sugar bowl. This led to Olaf's hatred of both the Baudelaire and Snicket families.

==== Bertrand Baudelaire ====
Bertrand Baudelaire is the father of Violet, Klaus and Sunny Baudelaire, the husband of Beatrice and a V.F.D. member. He trained under S. Theodora Markson, who was also Lemony Snicket's chaperone during his early training. Markson often describes Bertrand as a model apprentice.

Throughout the series, the children remember anecdotes about their father, such as him cooking at a dinner party, or splashing in a fountain to cheer up Sunny. He was a childhood friend of Beatrice and a good friend of Dewey Denouement. As a member of V.F.D., Bertrand helped train the V.F.D. lions to become the Volunteer Feline Detectives. Count Olaf implies that Bertrand and Beatrice murdered Olaf's parents during an opera performance. At the beginning of the series, Bertrand dies in the fire that destroyed the Baudelaire Mansion.

Before Violet's birth, Bertrand and Beatrice lived on the Island on which the events of The End (novel) take place. They built it to be a safe haven for volunteers who were affected by the schism. Ishmael arrived soon thereafter and began questioning their decisions, eventually taking over the island and banishing the Baudelaires. The Baudelaires then moved into their mansion and the city. They had minimal contact with V.F.D. afterwards since Violet only has vague memories of them and Klaus none at all.

In the TV series, Bertrand is portrayed by an unknown extra in season one and by Matthew James Dowden in season three.

==== Beatrice Baudelaire II ====
- "The End"
- "Chapter Fourteen"

Beatrice Baudelaire II is the daughter of Kit Snicket, who dies after giving birth. The infant Beatrice is adopted by the Baudelaire orphans, hence the use of the surname Baudelaire. At age one, "she looks very much like her mother," according to Chapter Fourteen. The younger Beatrice was named after the Baudelaires' mother Beatrice, at Kit's request and in keeping with the tradition of naming children after deceased friends.

In The Beatrice Letters, which is set ten years after the main series, she is the second Beatrice Baudelaire. She is searching for her uncle Lemony Snicket and for the Baudelaire orphans, who have apparently disappeared. She follows her uncle and writes him six letters. However, he constantly refuses to see her and actively runs from her. She writes that she attends a "secretarial school that is not really a secretarial school", implying that she has found a V.F.D. training school. Her sixth letter is signed "Beatrice Baudelaire, Baticeer Extraordinaire."

In the TV series, a preteen Beatrice Baudelaire II is portrayed by Angelina Capozzoli. After having been raised by the Baudelaires, she later encounters her uncle at Old Ed's Soda Shop to tell him what she and the Baudelaires have been up to since leaving the island. She begins going into how she and the Baudelaires encountered "female Finnish pirates." The episode ends before she can reveal the rest of her information.

==== Montgomery Montgomery ====
Dr. Montgomery Montgomery, also called "Uncle Monty" by the Baudelaire children, is Bertrand Baudelaire's cousin's brother-in-law and Violet, Klaus, and Sunny's second guardian. His sole appearance in the books is in The Reptile Room where he is introduced as a world-renowned herpetologist.

Uncle Monty is described as a "fat, short, chubby man with a round red face". He discovered and named the Incredibly Deadly Viper, deliberately misnaming the otherwise gentle animal to prank his colleagues. Uncle Monty is the first guardian who treats the Baudelaire siblings with kindness and respect and as a result the children immediately warm up to him, despite finding him a little peculiar. The children's life with Monty is ruined when Count Olaf kills Monty's assistant, Gustav, and poses as his new assistant named Stephano. The children immediately see through Olaf's disguise and try to warn Monty, but Monty simply believes Stephano to be a spy from the Herpetological Society. Ultimately, Olaf murders Monty using snake venom and attempts to frame it as a snake bite. Although the children are able to reveal Olaf's true identity and how he murdered Monty, Olaf still manages to escape and remains at large at the end of the book.

Monty also appears in some Snicket's other works and the broader universe of the series. Snicket's autobiography indicates that Uncle Monty's death may be partly attributable to his failure to learn the Sebald Code. In the book Who Could That Be at This Hour?, Monty is mentioned by Hector in the final chapter.

In the film adaptation, Montgomery Montgomery is portrayed by Billy Connolly. He is voiced by Bob Joles in the video game.

In the TV series, Montgomery Montgomery is played by Aasif Mandvi. He is shown to have a ticket taker ally at the local movie theater who helped him splice the footage so that he can take down the remaining hidden message. Monty appears once again during a flashback scene in "The Carnivorous Carnival" Pt. 1 where he attends a VFD party as he and his ticket taker ally interact with Larry.

==== Josephine Anwhistle ====
Josephine Anwhistle, also called Aunt Josephine, is Violet, Klaus and Sunny's second cousin's sister-in-law, and becomes their guardian in The Wide Window. She is portrayed as an overly cautious woman who is afraid of everything, including doorknobs, radiators and realtors. She developed these fears after losing her husband, Isaac "Ike" Anwhistle, to the carnivorous Lachrymose leeches when he swam in Lake Lachrymose less than an hour after eating something.

Aunt Josephine believes grammar is the greatest joy in life and has a personal library filled with books about grammar. Due to her irrational fears and obsession with grammar, the children struggle to fully acclimate with her. Count Olaf woos her disguised as a sea captain named Captain Sham. He later reveals himself to Josephine and forces her into writing a suicide note that leaves the children in his care. Aunt Josephine hides a message in her note in the form of grammatical mistakes. Klaus is able to decode the message which reveals Josephine is hiding in Curdled Cave. The children go the cave and convince Aunt Josephine to come back to talk to Mr. Poe. As they are leaving, however, they are caught by Hurricane Hermann and Lachrymose leeches and are ultimately rescued by Olaf. Olaf almost lets Josephine go but pushes her overboard after she corrects his grammar. It is implied that she was eaten by the leeches just like her husband.

Like many of the Baudelaire's other guardians, Josephine also appears in All the Wrong Questions, specifically in Shouldn't You Be in School?, as an associate of Lemony Snicket.

In the movie, Aunt Josephine is portrayed by Meryl Streep. In the video game adaptation, she is voiced by Donna Bullock. She was shown to be courageous before Ike's death.

In the TV series, she is played by Alfre Woodard. Like the film, Aunt Josephine is explicitly shown to be more courageous before Ike's death. Aunt Josephine is also seen in "The Carnivorous Carnival" Pt. 1 where she was seen in a flashback attending a VFD party with Ike. She shoots down his suggestion for them to have children.

==== Isaac "Ike" Anwhistle ====
Isaac "Ike" Anwhistle is the late husband of Josephine Anwhistle and the brother of Gregor Anwhistle, making him a distant relative of the Baudelaire's mother, Beatrice Baudelaire. He was shown to have a courageous personality and had a love for grammar, like his wife.

While on a picnic with his wife, Ike wanted to go swimming in Lake Lachrymose, though Josephine had warned him to wait an hour after eating, in order to avoid attracting the Lachrymose Leeches. Ignoring Josephine, he only waited 45 minutes, which led to him being devoured by the Lachrymose Leeches, leaving Josephine traumatized and terrified of the lake.

In the TV series, Ike is portrayed by the show's developer Barry Sonnenfeld. His picture was shown in Josephine's house in "The Wide Window". In "The Carnivorous Carnival" Pt. 1, Ike made an appearance in a flashback at a celebration at the V.F.D. headquarters on the day when Count Olaf failed to murder Beatrice.

=== Count Olaf's acting troupe ===
Count Olaf's acting troupe is a troupe of actors who follow Count Olaf as he hunts the Baudelaires. Few of them are given names. In the books, they are mostly referred to by descriptions. Along with Olaf, the members of the troupe often need to disguise themselves and use fake names, which are frequently anagrams of Count Olaf.

==== Esmé Squalor ====
Esmé Gigi Genevieve Squalor is Count Olaf's girlfriend and the ex-wife of Jerome Squalor. Her name is a reference to the short story "For Esmé—with Love and Squalor" by J.D. Salinger. Esmé is distinguished by her very tall height and her obsession with high fashion. She often wears outlandish outfits that she considers stylish.

Esmé first appears in The Ersatz Elevator, as "the city's sixth most important financial advisor", when the Baudelaires are placed in the care of the Squalors. Count Olaf appears disguised as an auctioneer named Gunther. Although the Baudelaires try to warn her, it is later revealed that she knew his true identity all along and was even assisting him in securing the Quagmire triplets. The book ends with Esmé and Count Olaf driving away together. From thereon, Esmé is a central character of the series, working closely with Count Olaf and commanding his troupe. In following books, it is revealed that Esmé was also a member of VFD and indeed had even known the Baudelaire parents. She is keenly interested in finding the mysterious sugar bowl, which causes some minor rifts between her and Olaf. Her fate after the burning of Hotel Denounement is left unclear.

In the Netflix TV series, Esmé is portrayed by Lucy Punch. She is said to be the original owner of the sugar bowl which was stolen from her by Lemony Snicket and Beatrice Baudelaire. It is revealed in "The Penultimate Peril" Pt. 2 that she was in fact friends with Beatrice and Lemony, but that they stole the sugar bowl from her resulting in her fixation upon it.

==== The Hook-Handed Man ====
Fernald, commonly known as the Hook-Handed Man, is an assistant of Count Olaf who has hooks instead of hands ever since he lost his hands to the Bombinating Beast. He is one of the few members of the troupe who is named. He sometimes wears fake hands on his hooks when putting on disguises.

Although Fernald plays an important role in all the books as one of Olaf's henchmen, Fernald's history is only revealed in The Grim Grotto. He is the brother of Fiona and stepson of Captain Widdershins. He joined Olaf and left Captain Widdershins after burning down Anwhistle Aquatics and killing Gregor Anwhistle. In The Grim Grotto, Fiona convinces Fernald to betray Count Olaf and steal his submarine.

In the movie, Fernald is portrayed by Jamie Harris and is voiced by Jay Gordon.

Usman Ally plays him in the TV series. In the TV series, Fernald is depicted as relatively mild-mannered when compared with the rest of the crew and even develops a close relationship with Sunny Baudelaire. "The Grim Grotto" Pt. 1 revealed that Fernald lost his hands when a fragment of Anwhistle Aquatics flew towards the boat he was in.

==== The Bald Man with the Long Nose ====
- The Bad Beginning
- The Miserable Mill
- The Hostile Hospital
- The Carnivorous Carnival

The Bald Man with the Long Nose is one of Olaf's henchmen; he is described as a bald man with a hooked nose who always wears a black robe. At the time when Count Olaf's true nature is exposed, the Bald Man is among the members of Count Olaf's theatre troupe that escape during the blackout.

In The Miserable Mill, the Bald Man disguises himself as Foreman Flacutono at the Lucky Smells Lumbermill.

In The Hostile Hospital, the Bald Man disguises himself as the head doctor, Dr. Flacutono at Heimlich Hospital while using a surgical mask to cover his face both times.

In The Carnivorous Carnival, the Bald Man helped to dig the pit for the lions that will be used in the lion-feeding event at the Caligari Carnival. He and Olivia Caliban fell into the lion pit during the crowd chaos and are devoured by the lions.

In the film, the Bald Man is portrayed by Luis Guzmán. He is shown to be the least sinister with no long nose but a short one, and for that matter least intelligent of the troupe; he is also shown to have a spiral tattoo on the back of his head. The deleted scenes reveal that he wishes to have a prominent role in The Marvelous Marriage, but Count Olaf makes him the effects man instead. In the video game adaptation, the Bald Man is voiced by S. Scott Bullock.

In the Netflix series, the Bald Man is portrayed by John DeSantis. He is shown to be rather large and intimidating with a short nose instead of a long one. In addition, the Bald Man has a deep bellowing voice. Despite this, he is shown to be just as unintelligent as his movie counterpart, though he is shown to be a talented artist. He also has a crush on Esmé. Unlike the novel, the Bald Man survives the events of "The Carnivorous Carnival". In "The Slippery Slope" Pt. 2, the Bald Man, the Person of Indeterminate Gender, and the White-Faced Women become disillusioned with Count Olaf and take their leave of him after he demands that they do away with Sunny. He tells Count Olaf to take care of Esmé. In "The End", Lemony postulates that he, along with the Person of Indeterminate Gender and the White-Faced Women, became successful performers in their own right.

==== The Henchperson of Indeterminate Gender ====
- The Bad Beginning
- The Wide Window
- The Hostile Hospital

The Henchperson of Indeterminate Gender is one of Olaf's henchpeople who appears in The Bad Beginning, The Wide Window, and The Hostile Hospital.

Described as a gigantic, overweight individual, with pure white eyes and an androgynous appearance, the Person is immensely strong and never speaks, except in bellows and roars. As the Person's gender is said to not look like a man nor a woman, even Count Olaf does not know what the Person's gender is. At the time when Count Olaf's true nature is exposed, the Person is among the members of Count Olaf's theatre troupe that escape during the blackout.

In The Wide Window, the Person posed as a security guard at "Captain Sham's Sailboat Rentals".

In The Hostile Hospital, the Person poses as a hospital security guard. The Person is last seen trapped in a fire at Heimlich Hospital trying to catch the Baudelaires. Their fate is unknown.

In the film, the Person is portrayed by Craig Ferguson. Most of the Person's dialogue is cut from the film; the Person possess a Scottish accent and surprisingly they too are unsure of their gender, though Count Olaf calls the Person "Eliza" even after referring to the Person as "he". They appear to wear both men and women outfits stitched together similarly to the circus performer Josephine Joseph; they also have a mustache on the left side, a beauty mark on the right lip, and a mole in the top middle of their forehead.

In the Netflix series, the Person is portrayed by Matty Cardarople. The Person is the youngest member of the troupe and, unlike in the books, actually talks a lot. However, the Person's speaking is prone to mumbling and mostly consists of rather educated observations that tend to agree with the Baudelaires' arguments much to the annoyance of Count Olaf and their fellow troupe members. Unlike in the books, the Person survives the events of "The Hostile Hospital". In "The Slippery Slope" Pt. 2, the Person of Indeterminate Gender, the Bald Man, and the White-Faced Women become disillusioned with Count Olaf and take their leave of him after he demands that they do away with Sunny. They quote that they need some space. In "The End", Lemony postulates that they, along with the Bald Man and the White-Faced Women, became successful performers in their own right.

==== The White-Faced Women ====
- The Bad Beginning
- The Austere Academy
- The Hostile Hospital
- The Carnivorous Carnival
- The Slippery Slope

The two White-Faced Women are members of Olaf's theater troupe who always cover their faces in white powder. They are apparently sisters.

They disguise themselves as cafeteria workers in The Austere Academy where they succeed in abducting the Quagmire Children.

In The Hostile Hospital, the White-Faced Women posed as Heimlich Hospital's workers Dr. Tocuna and Nurse Flo.

In The Carnivorous Carnival, the White-Faced Women helped to dig the pit for the lions that will be used for the lion-feeding event at the Caligari Carnival.

The White-Faced Women abandon Count Olaf in The Slippery Slope after accusing him of starting a fire that killed their third sibling and when they refused to kill Sunny. Their fates have been speculated by Lemony Snicket to either have them singing sad songs in some of the gloomiest music halls in the city, living together in the Hinterlands attempting to grow rhubarb in the dry and barren ground, or never making it out of the Mortmain Mountains where their bones can be found in one of the mountain range's many unbearable caves.

In the film, the two White-Faced Women are portrayed by Jennifer Coolidge and Jane Adams. They are both rather vain and seem to have a slight attraction to Count Olaf. As revealed in the deleted scenes, they seem to be slightly reciprocated. In the video game adaptation, the White-Faced Women are voiced by Jocelyn Blue and Kari Wahlgren. The White-Faced Women in the video game adaptation are named White-Faced Jen and White-Faced Jane after the actress that portrayed them in the film.

In the Netflix series, the White-Faced Women are portrayed by Jacqueline and Joyce Robbins. They are twins, they both wear glasses, and are both elderly. They admire Count Olaf and are always finishing each other's sentences. In "The Slippery Slope" Pt. 2, the White-Faced Women, the Person of Indeterminate Gender, and the Bald Man become disillusioned with Count Olaf and take their leave of him after he demands that they do away with Sunny. The White-Faced Women stated that they would not stoop to that level. In "The End", Lemony postulates that they, along with the Bald Man and the Person of Indeterminate Gender, became successful performers in their own right.

==== The Wart-Faced Man ====
- The Bad Beginning

The Wart-Faced Man is a man with warts on his face who is a minor member of Count Olaf's theater troupe where he works on Count Olaf's play that would have him actually marrying Violet. Lemony Snicket described him as being important-looking. Upon Count Olaf's true nature being exposed during the play, the Wart-Faced Man causes a blackout that enables himself, Count Olaf, the Hook-Handed Man, the Bald Man with the Long Nose, the Person of Indeterminate Gender, and the two White-Faced Women to escape. The Wart-Faced Man is not seen again after that.

==== Unseen associates ====
In The Bad Beginning, it was mentioned that there were at least seven other members of Count Olaf's troupe that attended Count Olaf's dinner party. While the Baudelaires did not get a good look at them, they can tell that they are frightening like the rest of the troupe members.

Chapter 10 of Lemony Snicket: The Unauthorized Autobiography mention the tallying of total 17 total members of Count Olaf's acting troupe in Lemony's commonplace book that was sent to Valorous Farms Dairy. These unseen associates were mentioned here.

==== Carmelita Spats ====
- The Austere Academy
- The Slippery Slope
- The Grim Grotto
- The Penultimate Peril

Carmelita Spats is a 11-13 year old pupil of Prufrock Preparatory School and a Snow Scout, appearing in The Austere Academy, The Slippery Slope, The Grim Grotto and The Penultimate Peril. She dislikes the Baudelaires, taunting them for being orphans and calling them "cakesniffers". Carmelita is liked by Vice-Principal Nero and disliked by Mrs. Bass.

Her uncle Bruce is the leader of the Snow Scouts as seen in The Slippery Slope. She hikes up the Mortmain Mountain every year with the group, which celebrates the False Spring by crowning her queen. One year later, she meets Olaf and Esmé at the peak of the mountain, and they unofficially adopt her.

In The Grim Grotto, she claims to be a "tap-dancing ballerina fairy princess veterinarian" and performs a recital. Esmé finds this adorable while Olaf is annoyed by it.

In The Penultimate Peril, she dresses as a "ballplaying cowboy superhero soldier pirate" and has a pool and a ship brought to the rooftop sunbathing salon of the Hotel Denouement.

In the Netflix TV series, Carmelita Spats is portrayed by Kitana Turnbull. Unlike the books, Carmelita was the one who snuck Count Olaf and his troupe into Prufrock Preparatory School upon Count Olaf making a deal with her through the bleachers. She also helped Count Olaf and the White-Faced Women trap Larry in the walk-in freezer. The series also comically depicts her literally sniffing cakes (in the manner of cocaine) which she does in secret in the middle of the night when nobody is looking. In "The Grim Grotto" Pt. 1, Carmelita poses as the daughter of a normal happy family when a disguised Count Olaf plans to obtain a submarine. In "The Penultimate Peril" Pt. 1, Carmelita is unaware that her parents are dead as Count Olaf and Esmé cover up that fact. In "The Penultimate Peril" Pt. 2, Carmelita and Esmé cook up some over-peppered crow meat sausages. When the Hotel Denouement begins going up in flames, Olaf sarcastically tells Carmelita and Esmé that the sugar bowl is in the laundry room, leaving their fates ambiguous.

==== Caligari Carnival freaks ====
The Caligari Carnival freaks are members of a freak show that reside in the Caligari Carnival's House of Freaks. They later side with Count Olaf.

==== Hugo ====
- The Carnivorous Carnival
- The Slippery Slope
- The Penultimate Peril

Hugo is a hunchback who is one of the Caligari Carnival freaks. He has a hunched back that makes him look slightly awkward. He is good-natured and always flexible towards the present circumstances.

Hugo lives with the Baudelaire children for a small period of time in The Carnivorous Carnival and appears to bond with Sunny Baudelaire when they make soup together. He later became one of Count Olaf's henchmen when Esmé gives him the large coat that was a part of the Hook-Handed Man's doorman disguise that would hide his hunchback.

After discovering that the Baudelaire siblings are not actually freaks, Hugo appears especially bitter towards them in The Slippery Slope.

In The Penultimate Peril, which marks his final appearance in the series, he and the freaks are present at the Hotel Denouement where Hugo poses as a worker at the hotel's rooftop sunbathing salon. When Dewey Denouement is killed during the confrontation with Count Olaf which awakens all the hotel patrons, he agrees with Mrs. Bass when she claims that the Baudelaire children are criminals and he says that they are too freakish to be allowed to move around freely. During the blindfolded trial presided over by Justice Strauss, Hugo presents some carnival posters as evidence. When Hotel Denouement catches fire, Hugo, Colette and Kevin are last seen holding the bird paper that Klaus hung on the outside of the sauna. Hugo asks if the plan for the hors-d'œuvres is still in operation. It is left uncertain whether Hugo survived the fire at the Hotel Denouement.

In the TV series, Hugo is portrayed by Kevin Cahoon. He, Colette and Kevin follow Olaf like in the book. However, they immediately wise up to his carelessness when he has them stay outside their camp during the events of "The Slippery Slope Pt. 1". They soon have an encounter with the Man with a Beard But No Hair and the Woman with Hair But No Beard and are not seen again afterwards. When Count Olaf comments that the freaks are running around the mountain somewhere, the Woman with Hair But No Beard quotes "Not anymore." Olaf's henchmen deduce that they were killed by the couple.

==== Colette ====
- The Carnivorous Carnival
- The Slippery Slope
- The Penultimate Peril

Colette is a contortionist who is one of the Caligari Carnival freaks. She considers her trait to be an abnormality rather than an ability.

In The Carnivrous Carnival, Esmé swayed her to Count Olaf's side by giving her a large robe that would allow her to contort her body into any shape she wanted without people being aware.

In The Slippery Slope, Colette wondered why the White-Faced Women disliked their paleness since they used makeup and powder in front of her.

In The Penultimate Peril, Colette was present at the Hotel Denouement where she posed as a chemist in a long white coat and surgical mask staying at the Hotel Denouement that is outside of the sauna when Frank or Ernest Denouement suggests that she takes Sir and Charles to room 547 where Organic Chemistry is. During the blindfolded trial, Colette submitted some drawings as evidence. When Hotel Denouement was starting to catch on fire, Hugo, Colette, and Kevin were last seen holding the bird paper that Klaus hung on the outside of the sauna. Colette talks about plucking the feathers off some crows. It is left uncertain if Colette survived the fire at the Hotel Denouement.

In the TV series, Colette is portrayed by real-life contortionist Bonnie Morgan. She, Hugo and Kevin follow Olaf like in the book. However, they immediately wise up to his carelessness when he has them stay outside their camp during the events of "The Slippery Slope Pt. 1". They soon have an encounter with the Man with a Beard But No Hair and the Woman with Hair But No Beard and are not seen again afterwards. When Count Olaf comments that the freaks are running around the mountain somewhere, the Woman with Hair But No Beard quotes "Not anymore." Olaf's henchmen deduce that they were killed by the couple.

==== Kevin ====
- The Carnivorous Carnival
- The Slippery Slope
- The Penultimate Peril

Kevin is an ambidextrous man with a wrinkly face who is one of the Caligari Carnival freaks. Though his trait is considered advantageous by many people, he views it as a disability.

In The Carnivorous Carnival, Esmé swayed Kevin to Count Olaf's side by giving him a rope that would enable him to tie one hand behind his back so that he can look normal.

In The Penultimate Peril, Kevin was present at the Hotel Denouement where he poses as a washerwoman in the Hotel Denouement's laundry room. During the blindfolded trial, Kevin submitted books as evidence with both his hands. When Hotel Denouement was starting to catch on fire, Hugo, Colette, and Kevin were last seen holding the bird paper that Klaus hung on the outside of the sauna. Kevin wonders if he should hold the bird paper with his left hand or his right hand. It is left uncertain if Kevin survived the fire at the Hotel Denouement.

In the TV series, Kevin is portrayed by Robbie Amell. He, Colette and Hugo follow Olaf like in the book. However, they immediately wise up to his carelessness when he has them stay outside their camp during the events of "The Slippery Slope Pt. 1". They soon have an encounter with the Man with a Beard But No Hair and the Woman with Hair But No Beard and are not seen again afterwards. When Count Olaf comments that the freaks are running around the mountain somewhere, the Woman with Hair But No Beard quotes "Not anymore." Olaf's henchmen deduce that they were killed by the couple.

==== The Man with a Beard But No Hair ====
- The Slippery Slope
- The Penultimate Peril

The Man with a Beard But No Hair is a high-voiced man who has no background history, but is said to be villainous to the point that even Count Olaf fears him. He and The Woman With Hair But No Beard were Count Olaf's mentors; he refers to them as "mommy" and "daddy".

He and the Woman with Hair But No Beard first appear in The Slippery Slope where they congratulate Count Olaf for setting fire to the Caligari Carnival and gave him the coveted Snicket File when they meet him at the Mortmain Mountains. After some eagles are summoned to abduct the Snow Scouts, the Man with a Beard But No Hair and the Woman with Hair But No Beard escape on some of them telling Count Olaf that they will see them at the Hotel Denouement.

In The Penultimate Peril, the Man with a Beard But No Hair and the Woman with Hair But No Beard served as judges alongside Justice Strauss at the trial of the Baudelaire children and Count Olaf. When Count Olaf starts the fire at the Hotel Denouement, the Man with a Beard But No Hair was last seen on the first floor with his hand on Jerome Squalor as he secretly praises Count Olaf for starting the fire. When Jerome asks how arson is a good thing, the Man with a Beard But No Hair changes his comment by helping the Woman with Hair But No Beard in directing Frank and Ernest Denouement to the elevator. It is left uncertain if the Man with a Beard But No Hair survived the fire at the Hotel Denouement.

In the TV series, he is played by Richard E. Grant. The Man with a Beard But No Hair has a deep and haunting voice in the series and was a father figure and mentor of sorts to Olaf. He constantly viewed him as a disappointment and even scoffs at his quest to acquire the Baudelaire fortune. The Man ends up taking an interest in Esmé and begins giving her perks over Olaf. In "The Grim Grotto" Pt. 1, the Man with a Beard But No Hair and the Woman with Hair But No Beard pre-pay for a submarine to be used by Esmé. In "The Penultimate Peril" Pt. 2, he and the Woman with Hair But No Beard pose as judges at the trial of the Baudelaires and Count Olaf where they find the Baudelaires guilty. In contrast to the novel, he chastises Olaf for not burning down the Hotel Denouement when he claimed to the people in the lobby that the fire warning is a fake. Count Olaf responds by leaving him and the Woman with Hair But No Beard behind as Justice Strauss shouts that they are a disgrace to the legal profession.

==== The Woman with Hair But No Beard ====
- The Slippery Slope
- The Penultimate Peril

The Woman with Hair But No Beard is a low deep-voiced associate of the Man with a Beard But No Hair where they are the latest members of Count Olaf's theatre troupe. Her "aura of menace" even frightens Count Olaf and Lemony Snicket states that he refused to write down her real name.

She and the Man with a Beard But No Hair first appeared in The Slippery Slope where they congratulate Count Olaf for setting fire to the Caligari Carnival and gave him the coveted Snicket File when they meet him at the Mortmain Mountains. After some eagles are summoned to abduct the Snow Scouts, the Man with a Beard But No Hair and the Woman with Hair But No Beard escape on some of them telling Count Olaf that they will see them at the Hotel Denouement.

In The Penultimate Peril, the Woman with Hair But No Beard and the Man with a Beard But No Hair served as judges alongside Justice Strauss at the trial of the Baudelaire children and Count Olaf. When Count Olaf starts the fire at the Hotel Denouement, the Woman with Hair But No Beard was last seen on the first floor where she directs the blindfolded Frank and Ernest to the elevator. It is left uncertain if the Woman with Hair But No Beard survived the fire at the Hotel Denouement.

In the TV series, she is played by Beth Grant. She has a plain and feminine voice in the series and was a mother figure and mentor of sorts to Olaf. She constantly viewed him as a disappointment and even scoffs at his quest to acquire the Baudelaire fortune. She ends up taking an interest in Esmé and begins giving her perks over Olaf. In "The Grim Grotto" Pt. 1, the Woman with Hair But No Beard and the Man with a Beard But No Hair pre-pay for a submarine to be used by Esmé. In "The Penultimate Peril" Pt. 2, the Woman with Hair But No Beard pose as judges at the trial of the Baudelaires and Count Olaf where they find the Baudelaires guilty. In contrast to the novel, she chastises Olaf for not burning down the Hotel Denouement when he claimed to the people in the lobby that the fire warning is a fake. Count Olaf responds by leaving her and the Man with a Beard But No Hair behind as Justice Strauss shouts that they are a disgrace to the legal profession.

=== Quagmire triplets ===
Quigley, Duncan, and Isadora Quagmire are triplets that are older than Klaus but younger than Violet, appearing to be between the ages of 12 and 13. Their parents are Mr. Quagmire and Mrs. Quagmire, who appear in the "Wide Window" and "Miserable Mill". They help the Baudelaires on some of their adventures and misfortunes. While they are often mistaken to be twins because Quigley supposedly died in a fire, Duncan and Isadora still consider themselves to be triplets, and so do the Baudelaires. The triplets will receive their fortune of sapphires when they come of age.

==== Duncan and Isadora Quagmire ====
Duncan and Isadora Quagmire are students at Prufrock Preparatory School in The Austere Academy. They become friends with the Baudelaires as their situations are similar: both families lost their parents in a fire and will inherit a large fortune upon Violet and Quigley coming of age. The Quagmires attempt to help the Baudelaires work out Count Olaf's plan, but end up being kidnapped by him at the end of The Austere Academy.

They return in The Ersatz Elevator and The Vile Village and the Baudelaires try to help them escape Olaf's clutches. In the end of The Vile Village, they end up escaping in a hot-air balloon house with Hector, the handyman from the Village of Fowl Devotees.

In The End, Kit Snicket tells the Baudelaires that she briefly met up with them, but does not know what happened to them as she abandoned them when threatened by the Great Unknown. Later, they reunite with their brother Quigley Quagmire.

In the TV series, Duncan and Isadora are portrayed by Dylan Kingwell and Avi Lake, respectively. The TV series portrays a romantic relationship between Duncan and Violet that is not seen in the books, as Lemony Snicket did not reveal that Duncan has a crush on her, but was originally depicted there with Quigley. It was also suspected that Isadora had a crush on Klaus. Much like the novel, they escape with Hector in the hot-air balloon. They briefly appear in "The End", where Lemony postulates that they successfully reunited with Quigley.

Duncan and Isadora are named after the dancer Isadora Duncan.

==== Quigley Quagmire ====
Quigley Quagmire is the oldest Quagmire triplet and the brother of Duncan and Isadora Quagmire, who was assumed to be killed in the fire which killed his parents.

He actually escaped and eventually managed to find the Baudelaires in The Slippery Slope, where he helped Violet and Klaus rescue Sunny and later falls in love with Violet. He was confirmed to be the survivor of the fire that was sighted in the Mortmain Mountains. He was then separated from the Baudelaires in the Stricken Stream.

He managed to meet up with his siblings according to Kit Snicket in The End.

In the TV series, Quigley is portrayed by Dylan Kingwell. His appearance is different from Duncan where he had a messy hairstyle in season one and shoulder-length hair in season three. He appears in both parts of "The Grim Grotto" where he is shown to have acquired the sugar bowl and has the birds take it to the Hotel Denouement. He briefly appears in "The End", where Lemony postulates that he successfully reunited with Duncan and Isadora.

=== Baudelaire children guardians ===
Violet Baudelaire, Klaus Baudelaire, and Sunny Baudelaire live with various guardians following the death of Mr. and Mrs. Baudelaire. After a brief stay with Mr. Poe, the children are shuffled from one legal guardian to another until The Vile Village when they run away from the Village of Fowl Devotees and become fugitives for the "murder" of Count Olaf. From this point on, there is always someone (or in some cases several someones) who takes care of them.

Besides Count Olaf, Uncle Montgomery, and Aunt Josephine, among the known guardians in order of appearance are:

==== Sir ====
Sir
- A Series of Unfortunate Events character
- First appearance: The Miserable Mill
- Last appearance: The Penultimate Peril
- Portrayed by: Don Johnson
- Occupation: Owner of Lucky Smells Lumbermill

In The Miserable Mill, Sir is the proprietor of the Lucky Smells Lumbermill, located in Paltryville. His real name is not known, although it has been described as being hard to pronounce. Mr. Poe has attempted to pronounce the first syllable of the name, using a radically different syllable every time (Wuz, Qui, Bek, Duy, Sho, Gek, etc.). Klaus may have been able to pronounce it, but he is shot down by Mr. Poe stating it's too complicated for an adult.

Equally obscure is Sir's appearance. Sir's entire head is hidden by the thick smoke of his ever-burning cigar; Lemony Snicket also stated that neither the Baudelaires, the reader, or himself would ever see Sir's face. He shows little or no concern for either the Baudelaire orphans or his employees, whom he pays in coupons and provides with an unsatisfying meal of chewing gum. His partner Charles mentions that he has had a terrible childhood. Following Count Olaf being exposed, the death of Dr. Georgina Orwell, and Count Olaf's escape with the Bald Man with the Big Nose, Sir fires the Baudelaire children, thinking that they would bring misery to Lucky Smells Lumbermill much to Charles' objection.

He later appears in The Penultimate Peril where he and Charles were at Hotel Denouement and staying in room 674 which was reserved for people in the lumbermill industry. Klaus takes them to the sauna down the hall. Charles explains to Sir that he wants to apologize to the Baudelaires for their treatment. While in the sauna, the two of them talk about a party on Thursday held by a person with the initials J.S. as well as Charles addressing to Sir about fires being used in the lumber industry. Sir planned to do business with some rich people there in order to save his lumber business. In addition, Sir mentions that lumber from Lucky Smells Lumbermill was used to build Hotel Denouement. Frank or Ernest Denouement appears and states to Sir and Charles that the sauna has to be cleared out. To satisfy Sir's claim of liking the burning wood smell, Frank or Ernest has Colette posing as a chemist waiting outside to take them to room 547 where Organic Chemistry is. When Dewey Denouement is accidentally killed during a confrontation with Count Olaf which woke up all the patrons, Sir claimed the Baudelaires caused accidents at the Lucky Smells Lumbermills where Charles stated that Count Olaf was responsible for them. During the blindfolded trial, Sir submitted employment papers as evidence. When Count Olaf starts a fire at the Hotel Denouement, Sir was last seen holding hands with Charles on one of the floors arguing about the use of fires in the lumbermill industry.

In the 2017 Netflix series, he is portrayed by Don Johnson. Unlike the novel, his face is completely shown. As he never encountered Mr. Poe, he met the Baudelaire children when they were brought to him by Charles who found them near the Lucky Smells Lumbermill. Upon the Baudelaire children breaking Georgina Orwell's hypnosis on the workers, Sir flees during the employee chaos. His role in The Penultimate Peril has been omitted.

===== Charles =====
- The Miserable Mill
- The Penultimate Peril

Charles is Sir's partner at the Lucky Smells Lumbermill in The Miserable Mill.

Charles is kind to the Baudelaires but not very helpful; he organizes a library to be set up at the mill but it only contained three books. He was nearly killed by a hypnotized Klaus before being broken free from Dr. Georgina Orwell's hypnosis by Violet. When Sir fires the Baudelaire children thinking that they will bring more misery to the lumbermill, Charles objected to Sir's action.

Charles makes an appearance in The Penultimate Peril, staying with Sir in the Hotel Denouement where they are seen in room 674 with other people in the lumbermill industry. He explains to Sir that he wants to apologize to the Baudelaires for their treatment and he is sent a letter by J.S., which assists him in his search. Both of them are taken by Klaus to the sauna that's down the hall where they both talk about a party on Thursday held by someone with the initials J.S. Although it is not stated in the book, Charles may be on the firefighting side of V.F.D. due to a mentioning by Kit Snicket where he sent her some blueprints. Charles voices his concerns about fires being used in the lumber business to Sir. Frank or Ernest Denouement appears and states to Sir and Charles that the sauna has to be cleared off. To satisfy Sir's claim of liking the burning wood smell, Frank or Ernest has Colette posing as a chemist waiting outside to take them to room 547 where Organic Chemistry is. When Dewey Denouement is accidentally killed during a confrontation with Count Olaf which woke up all the patrons, Charles objects to Sir's claims that the Baudelaires caused accidents at the Lucky Smells Lumbermill and states that Count Olaf was responsible. During the blindfolded trial, Charles submitted some environmental studies as evidence. When Count Olaf starts a fire at the Hotel Denouement, Charles was last seen holding hands with Sir on one of the floors where they argue about the use of fire in the lumbermill industry.

In the 2017 Netflix TV series, Charles is portrayed by Rhys Darby. It is strongly implied that Charles is Sir's domestic partner, something that was only vaguely implied in The Penultimate Peril. In this show, Charles was the one who found the Baudelaires near the property and brought them to Sir. Charles mentions that he does things for Sir like ironing his clothes, cooking his omelets, and making him milkshakes. Before leaving to find Sir after he fled during the employee chaos, Charles shows the Baudelaires the truth about their parents actually fighting the fire in Paltryville. His role in "The Penultimate Peril" has been omitted, though Jerome Squalor called him 'the love of his life' and said he could not come due to some business at the mill.

==== Vice-Principal Nero ====
Vice-Principal Nero
- A Series of Unfortunate Events character
- First appearance: The Austere Academy
- Last appearance: The Penultimate Peril
- Portrayed by: Roger Bart
- Occupation: Vice Principal

Vice-Principal Nero is the childish, narcissistic, egotistic, and delusional vice-principal of Prufrock Preparatory School in The Austere Academy. His name is seemingly an allusion to the Roman Emperor Nero, who is often said to have "fiddled while Rome burned."

Vice Principal Nero plays the violin, and he expects all the students to attend his daily six-hour violin performances.

Nero dresses in a brown suit with a necktie patterned with pictures of snails. In The Austere Academy, his hair is tied into four pigtails, but by The Penultimate Peril, they have grown into four long braids that dangle behind him. Nero often mimics what others say in a high, mocking tone and has numerous strict and unusual punishments for his students, especially if they miss his violin performances where those who miss it must buy a bag of candy and watch Nero eat it.

In his first appearance, he gives Mr. Poe the approval to let the Baudelaires live at his boarding school where his security system will detect Count Olaf if he came near the school. Vice-Principal Nero had them in the Orphans Shack with the Quagmire Children and had Sunny work as his administrative assistant. While he has adored the student Carmelita Spats, he unknowingly hired Count Olaf in the form of Coach Genghis to be the new gym teacher. When Coach Genghis puts the Baudelaires through the S.O.R.E. exams, Nero states to them that this will not exempt them from his violin recitals and that they will owe him bags of candy. When the Baudelaires were caught "cheating" in the S.O.R.E. exams, Nero gleefully expels the Baudelaires much to the objection of Mrs. Bass and Mr. Remora. Even after Count Olaf was exposed as Coach Genghis and gets away, Nero still would not have the Baudelaires living with him which he argued with Mr. Poe on.

In Lemony Snicket: The Unauthorized Autobiography, it was mentioned that Kit Snicket went to Prufrock Preparatory School where she operated under the alias of Ms. K following Mr. Remora's retirement. This lasted until Vice-Principal Nero fired her upon Carmelita Spats' parents tipping him off that Ms. K had given her students books that were not on the approved reading list. Upon Nero firing her, she ran off and took two orphaned students with her.

Nero re-appears in The Penultimate Peril when he, along with Mr. Remora and Mrs. Bass staying in room 371 at the Hotel Denouement and are invited to a cocktail party hosted by "J.S." and Esmé Squalor. When being taken by a disguised Sunny to the Hotel Denouement's Indian restaurant run by Hal, Nero expresses interest to perform his violin at the cocktail party so that his musical genius can be recognized and he can resign as vice-principal. When Nero hears from Hal that they do not serve candy in his restaurant, Nero comments that he would not have anything. When Dewey Denouement is accidentally killed during a confrontation with Count Olaf which woke up all the patrons, Nero mimics what Mr. Remora claimed about the Baudelaire children and claims that Violet and Klaus failed all the tests and were not good students while Sunny was the worst administrative assistant. During the blindfolded trial, Nero submitted administrative records as evidence. When Count Olaf starts the fire at the Hotel Denouement, Nero and Mr. Remora were last seen wandering the seventh story as Nero starts to worry about his violin case. It is unknown whether or not he made out alive.

In the Netflix TV series, Vice-Principal Nero is portrayed by Roger Bart. In this show, his full name is Nero Feint where he is less cruel and more sympathetic as well as being financially poor. He is also shown to be extremely out of the loop, wondering why Wolfgang Amadeus Mozart does not reply to his letters and thinks Voltaire is probably some French kid he expelled for smoking. When Sunny was working as Nero's administrative assistant, he had her write letters to certain people in the music community to ask them about the reasons behind the restraining orders they sent him. In addition, Nero is also shown to not like Olivia Caliban. Nero later assists Mr. Remora and Mrs. Bass into giving an exam to the Baudelaires where he had Sunny organize the list of students who owe him candy by the color of the candy in question. Sunny passes this test as Nero is inspired to keep improving his musical ways. He was shown to have been surprised when Count Olaf was exposed. Unlike the books, Nero does not expel the Baudelaires. Instead, Mr. Poe takes them away to their next guardian following Count Olaf's escape. Though it was mentioned that Nero put Olivia on an unpaid leave in "The Ersatz Elevator" Pt. 1. In "The Penultimate Peril" Pt. 1, it is revealed that Vice-Principal Nero is a fan of Esmé Squalor and the vice-president of her fan club. In "The Penultimate Peril" Pt. 2, Nero had a conversation with a taxi driver that used to go to Prufrock Preparatory before the trial where he states that Count Olaf owes him bags of candy for the violin recitals he did not attend unlike Coach Genghis (somehow refusing to believe them being the same person). When the taxi driver asks him to give his regards to the principal (finally acknowledging Nero's second-in-command position), Nero mocks what he said, states that the vice-principal is better, and mentioned that nobody has seen the principal, who turns out to be Ishmael, in years. In this adaptation, he was last seen with Mr. Poe and like the book, it is unknown whether or not he made out of the fire alive.

==== Jerome Squalor ====
Jerome Squalor
- A Series of Unfortunate Events character
- First appearance: The Ersatz Elevator
- Last appearance: The Penultimate Peril
- Portrayed by: Tony Hale
- Family: Esmé Squalor (ex-wife); Violet, Klaus, and Sunny Baudelaire (briefly)

Jerome Squalor first appears in The Ersatz Elevator as the husband of Esmé Squalor.

Together, Esmé and Jerome briefly adopted the Baudelaires. Jerome is kind to the Baudelaires, but completely submissive to Esmé and other characters due to his distaste for arguing. He is less of a follower of fashion than Esmé. Jerome is rich and successful as is his wife. At the end of the novel, Esmé leaves Jerome to become a member of Count Olaf's troupe and Count Olaf's girlfriend. The Baudelaires leave Jerome behind as he does not wish to help them rescue the Quagmires.

In Lemony Snicket: The Unauthorized Autobiography, there are two letters concerning Jerome. One letter Lemony got from Jerome had him mentioning that the food at "The Anxious Clown" was terrible.

Jerome returns in The Penultimate Peril. Feeling guilty at his desertion of the Baudelaires, he has been researching their case and writing a book about injustice entitled Odious Lusting After Finance (a backronym of "Olaf"). He arrives with Justice Strauss to meet up with the Baudelaires and Dewey Denouement which led to them being confronted by Count Olaf. Jerome also meets his wife Esmé at the Hotel Denouement during the confrontation. When she dumps Count Olaf publicly, Jerome urges Esmé to rejoin his side. Esmé refuses his offer. When Dewey Denouement is accidentally killed during this confrontation which woke up all the patrons, Jerome states that the Baudelaires are not murderers. He gives his book to Justice Strauss to be used as evidence against Count Olaf at Count Olaf and the Baudelaires's trial which was met with a mix of cheers and hisses. His book was later used for kindling when Count Olaf started the fire at the Hotel Denouement. As the fire starts, Jerome is last seen on the first floor with the Man with a Beard But No Hair's hand on him. When Jerome asks how arson is a good thing when he hears the Man with a Beard But No Hair praise Count Olaf, the Man with a Beard But No Hair changes his comment by helping the Woman with Hair But No Beard direct Frank and Ernest to the elevator.

In the Netflix TV series, Jerome Squalor is portrayed by Tony Hale. Unlike the book, Jerome does not teach the Baudelaires how to slide down the banisters and he only kisses Sunny when they go their separate ways. In "The Penultimate Peril" Pt. 1, Jerome pretends to date Babs so that he can find the Baudelaires and is heavily implied to be in a relationship with Charles. He and Babs met at a support group of people who had bad experiences with Esmé. In "The Penultimate Peril" Pt. 2, Jerome states that he and Esmé are still married and are in the middle of a trial separation.

==== Hector ====
- The Vile Village

Hector is the handyman in the Village of Fowl Devotees appearing in the seventh book The Vile Village. He is the last official guardian of the Baudelaire children.

He is given the task of taking care of the Baudelaires under the Council of Elders' direction because nobody else wants the job. Hector is known to be skittish and always looks down and never speaks when in front of the Council of Elders, even when the Baudelaires needed his help in proving their innocence of Jacques Snicket's murder at the time when Jacques was mistaken for Count Olaf. He later escapes with the Quagmire triplets on his self-sustaining hot air mobile home, after finally standing up to the Council of Elders.

Notably, Hector is the only one of the Baudelaires' guardians who immediately believes them when they say that Count Olaf is present in disguise. He is also the only guardian who actively tries to help them discover more about V.F.D., and the only non-villain who wanted them to stay with him under any circumstances (not including the guardians of the Baudelaires that had died).

In the TV series, Hector is portrayed by Ithamar Enriquez. He is shown to have fainting spells when he is addressed by the Council of Elders which challenges his courage. Hector mentioned to the Baudelaires that his mother was busted for violating the rule where you cannot wear white after Yom Kippur. He mentioned that his mom had to pay a fine and she later moved to the City where she opened a gallery.

==== Hal ====
- The Hostile Hospital
- The Penultimate Peril

Hal is a near-sighted man in small glasses that first appears in the eighth novel The Hostile Hospital.

Working as a bookkeeper at the Library of Records in the Heimlich Hospital, he is one of the oldest men that the Baudelaires have ever met. When the Library of Records is burned down with the hospital by Count Olaf, Hal is quick to believe that the Baudelaires are responsible and so turns against them. He eventually forgives the Baudelaires and apologizes for believing Geraldine Julienne's stories in The Daily Punctilio.

In The Penultimate Peril, he reappears as the owner of an Indian restaurant at the Hotel Denouement in room 954 after he was approached by Dewey Denouement. He waited on Vice-Principal Nero, Mr. Remora, and Mrs. Bass when they were brought to his restaurant by a disguised Sunny. Although he owns the Indian restaurant and is seen wearing a turban, Hal is a terrible cook as mentioned when somebody's voice was heard in one of the windows claiming that he or she could not sleep because of the Indian food that he made. It is hinted that Hal may be a V.F.D. member as he says the code "I didn't realize this was a sad occasion" to Mr. Remora who failed to understand it as Mr. Remora quotes that "it won't be a sad occasion if you feed us." When Dewey Denouement is accidentally killed during a confrontation with Count Olaf which woke up all the patrons, Hal firmly says that the Baudelaires aren't criminals. During the blindfolded trial, Hal submitted some paperwork.

In the TV series, Hal is portrayed by David Alan Grier. In this show, he wears normal-sized glasses have magnifying lenses that are on both sides of his glasses. After Esmé destroys the Library of Records, Hal is depressed and operates the front desk when Mr. Poe arrives. Hal has him fill out the paperwork to get him checked out for his hay fever. When Klaus and Sunny in their alias of Dr. Faustus are exposed by Esmé, Hal comes in feeling deceived by the Baudelaires as the Baudelaires try to explain themselves. As Count Olaf in the alias of Mattathias Medicalschool starts a fire at the Heimlich Hospital and blames the Baudelaires for starting it, Hal joins the Person of Indeterminate Gender and some members of the Volunteers Fighting Disease into pursuing them. Before the fire can get worse, Hal managed to make it out alive feeling depressed at the loss of the Library of Records as he walks past Lemony Snicket during his narration. His part in "The Penultimate Peril" is omitted, though he does appear in a newspaper clipping with Mr. Poe.

==== Olivia Caliban ====
- The Carnivorous Carnival

Olivia Caliban (a.k.a. Madame Lulu) appears solely in The Carnivorous Carnival. She is technically the ninth guardian of the Baudelaire orphans due to the fact that the Baudelaires go to work for her.

She is a fraudulent fortune-teller. Her lightning device (operated by reflecting beams of the sunrise) tricks guests into believing in magical lightning. After instructing them to close their eyes, she seeks out the answers from the archival library under her table.

Madame Lulu says she just likes giving people what they want. It is implied, but not explicitly stated, that she is a member of V.F.D. The Grim Grotto reveals that she once knew Captain Widdershins. It is strongly implied that she is in love with Count Olaf, earning her the enmity of Olaf's then-girlfriend Esmé Squalor.

As a method of disguising her voice, she speaks in broken English with a thick fake accent, saying "please" in the middle or the end of her sentences (similar to Count Olaf in his alias as Gunther in book 6).

Lulu promised the Baudelaires that she would not tell Count Olaf where they were if they took her to the Mortmain Mountains. This place was marked on her map, but Klaus found that it was a coffee stain, but he later said that it might be there to refer to as a secret place, such as the headquarters of V.F.D.

Esmé Squalor convinces the "freaks" in the Caligari Carnival to murder her by pushing Madame Lulu into the lion pit in exchange for being hired by Count Olaf. After that, at the performance, Madame Lulu was to throw "Beverly and Eliot" into the pit. She was uncertain, which led everyone into a frenzy, rushing to throw them in. In all the commotion, Madame Lulu fell into the pit. Later Count Olaf reveals that Madame Lulu told him about the Baudelaires' disguises.

She has been implied to be a fortune-teller mentioned in a much earlier book who cursed Lemony Snicket when a policeman tripped Mr. Snicket, causing him to break the crystal ball he was holding. She also states in the book that Olaf promised to give her the Snicket Fortune for the times she helped Olaf.

When Olivia removes her turban, Snicket states she has blond hair but in illustrations, she is shown with black hair. If this is simply a mistake or not is unknown.

A later book mentions an "Olivia Caliban", who may be Olivia and who thus may be the sister of Friday's father Thursday Caliban.

In the TV series, Olivia Caliban is portrayed by Sara Rue. Her role is expanded where she first appears as a school librarian at Prufrock Preporatory School that is often disliked by Vice-Principal Nero. After the Hook-Handed Man makes off with Duncan and Isadora Quagmire, Olivia walks off with the book on secret organizations. After Olivia visits Mr. Poe and attempts to show him the book in "The Ersatz Elevator" while also mentioning that Vice-Principal Nero put her on an unpaid leave, Jacquelyn enlists Jacques Snicket to bring Olivia into the organization. While Larry keeps Esmé busy at Café Salmonella, Olivia accompanies Jacques into searching the Squalors' building for Duncan and Isadora. Olivia and Jacques later attend an auction presided over by Count Olaf's Gunther alias. In "The Vile Village" after Count Olaf's Detective Dupin alias tricks the Village of Fowl Devotees into thinking that Jacques Snicket is Count Olaf, Olivia negotiates with Esmé in exchange for the information about the Sugar Bowl that she is looking for. Jacques later directs Olivia to "Madame Lulu" so that she can find the Sugar Bowl before Count Olaf does. Madame Lulu turns out to be a title for the V.F.D. member stationed at the Caligari Carnival and the current Madame Lulu heads to Heimlich Hospital to recover the Sugar Bowl while Olivia takes the Madame Lulu mantle. When Count Olaf and his troop arrive at the carnival in hopes of finding out whether or not one of the Baudelaires' parents survived the fire as seen in "The Carnivorous Carnival", Olivia attempts to stall them until the other Madame Lulu arrives. She later encounters the Baudelaires, disguised as freaks, and gives them some of the information she has gained as a member of V.F.D., but also reveals that she has no idea whether or not one of their parents survived. However, she promises to take them to the old V.F.D. headquarters, where their parent may be if they are, in fact, alive. Before they can leave, unfortunately, Count Olaf begins the performance where one of the freaks will be thrown into the lion's pit, picking Klaus and Violet's two-headed disguise. Klaus and Violet attempt to trick Count Olaf out onto the platform by telling him to come push them in to make it more dramatic, plotting to push him in instead, but he sends Olivia to push them in in his place. Olivia manages to push them over the pit to safety. Before she can take out Count Olaf, he cuts the rope on the platform and drops her into the pit where she is devoured by the lions offscreen, much to the horror of the crowd. At the destroyed Caligari Carnival, Lemony Snicket stated that he never got to meet Olivia and that his brother loved her.

==== Bruce ====
Bruce is briefly a guardian of the Baudelaires. He first appears at the end of The Reptile Room in which he moves Uncle Monty's reptiles.

In The Slippery Slope, Bruce appears again as the leader of the Snow Scouts. The Baudelaires learn that he is the uncle of Carmelita Spats, a member of the Snow Scouts. Count Olaf cheated him out of Uncle Monty's reptile collection (except for one reptile, most likely the Incredibly Deadly Viper. This was confirmed in Lemony Snicket: The Unauthorized Autobiography, in which Lemony receives the letter from the owners of the Prospero). Bruce is kidnapped by the Man with a Beard But No Hair and the Woman with Hair But No Beard, along with all the Snow Scouts, save for Carmelita, at the end of the book.

At the Hotel Denouement, shortly after Dewey Denouement is accidentally killed, a man's voice is heard from one of the windows calling for a man named Bruce to come back to bed. Later as the hotel starts to burn, the Baudelaires hear the same man calling out for this Bruce while a woman calls out for her mother. It has not been confirmed if this is the same Bruce or a different Bruce.

When it came to the TV series, Daniel Handler stated in a Facebook interview that he became fond of Bruce and states that he would not be in the TV series. Instead, he was replaced in "The Slippery Slope" with someone named Brucie who is portrayed by Keegan Connor Tracy. While she is the leader of the Snow Scouts, Carmelita mostly uses Brucie as a pack mule. When en route to the top of Mount Fraught, Brucie stated to Carmelita that the False Spring Queen is an elected title causing Carmelita to lead the Snow Scouts into abandoning Brucie. Once Carmelita was gone with the Snow Scouts, Brucie runs off in the opposite direction and throws off the backpacks stating "I'm free."

==== Captain Widdershins ====
Captain Widdershins is the captain of the Queequeg submarine and the stepfather of Fiona and Fernald.

In The Grim Grotto, he finds Klaus, Violet, and Sunny Baudelaire at sea while he is looking for the sugar bowl and takes them aboard the Queequeg. He is extremely emphatic, with almost all of his sentences being exclamations, and permeates his speech with the word "Aye!" His personal philosophy is "He who hesitates is lost", which the Baudelaires find to be unreasonable. Captain Widdershins is considered the eleventh guardian of the Baudelaires. He seems aware that Fiona takes a fancy to Klaus (he accuses them of flirting when Fiona is proud Klaus knows what a mycologist is), stating that if Klaus finds the sugar bowl, he will "allow [Klaus] to marry Fiona."

After sending the Baudelaires and Fiona into the Gorgonian Grotto, he and Phil appear to desert the Queequeg. The reason may have to do with a woman who approached the Queequeg to tell Captain Widdershins something involving him being required to leave the submarine. In The Penultimate Peril, Kit Snicket says that she intends to meet Captain Widdershins and is later mentioned water-skiing towards and, soon after, away from him.

Kit had contacted all three of the Quagmire Triplets as well as their guardian Hector and had met with them and the crew of the Queequeg when their self-sustaining mobile home crashed into it. This reunion was short-lived, however, as all of the crew as well as the triplets were picked up by the mysterious '?' Shape (dubbed by Kit Snicket as "The Great Unknown"; implied to be the Bombinating Beast from All the Wrong Questions). Another note to make is that though he himself stated that The Great Unknown was "something worse than Olaf himself", he seemed to insist to take his chances with it as mentioned by Kit Snicket in The End.

It is possible that Captain Widdershins also has, or had, a fortune because when Count Olaf is talking about all the fortunes he will obtain, he says "the Widdershins fortune". Widdershins says that Fiona's mother died in a manatee accident.

In the TV series, Captain Widdershins is alluded to by Olivia Caliban when she reads the Hook-Handed Man's fortune. He does not physically appear in either parts of "The Grim Grotto" and only his portrait is shown. His role is primarily taken over by his daughter Fiona and they continuously state that he is lost at sea. In "The End", Lemony postulates that Fiona and Fernald successfully find him as they hear his transmission (provided by an uncredited actor).

==== Dewey Denouement ====
Dewey Denouement is the hotel manager of the Hotel Denouement and the brother of Frank and Ernest, but far fewer people are aware he exists. In addition to Dewey being an old friend of Bertrand Baudelaire, Count Olaf describes Dewey as a "legendary figure". He calls himself a "sub-sub-librarian" and has spent his life cataloging evidence hidden beneath the pond near the Hotel Denouement. Dewey was four when the Schism began and later began a relationship with Kit Snicket. His parents were killed when his house burned down.

At Hotel Denouement, Dewey was also responsible for winding up the clock that was built into the ceiling. He made himself known to the Baudelaires at midnight where he revealed his library at the bottom of the nearby pond. Dewey and the Baudelaires meet up with the arriving Justice Strauss and Jerome Squalor where all six of them are confronted in the lobby by Count Olaf and his remaining associates. When he refuses to tell Count Olaf the passwords to unlock a door (which supposedly led to a room containing the sugar bowl), Count Olaf threatens to shoot him with a harpoon gun. The Baudelaires try to save Dewey, but Count Olaf drops the gun when Mr. Poe shows up having been awoken by both sides and it goes off killing Dewey whose body falls into the pond which then sinks. He even quoted "Kit" as his final word. The harpoon gun going off also woke up the other patrons and staff members. As for Dewey's secret library, Lemony Snicket stated that it was unharmed when Hotel Denouement was set on fire.

In The End, Dewey is mentioned by Kit to be the father of her child.

In the TV series, Dewey is portrayed by Max Greenfield. He is officially confirmed to be Kit Snicket's lover in this show. Unlike the book, Dewey meets with Kit outside the Hotel Denouement as the Baudelaires enter the Hotel Denouement as concierges. When he meets the Baudelaires and they travel through the V.F.D. tunnels, he states that his secret library is filled with information gathered by every V.F.D. agent, scholar, researcher, inventor, scientist, explorer, cartographer, poet, journalist, naturalist, herpetologist, optometrist, receptionist, chef, waiter, taxi driver, sea captain, film director, ballerina, children's book author, and mountaineer.

==== Frank and Ernest Denouement ====
Frank Denouement and Ernest Denouement are identical brothers of Dewey and are managers of the Hotel Denouement who oversee the maintenance of the hotel and the needs of the guests. Frank is a "volunteer" while Ernest is a "villain" who used to be part of Count Olaf's theater troupe. The Baudelaires work in the hotel as concierges and meet the managers on several occasions, but fail to tell Frank and Ernest apart.

When their brother is accidentally killed during a confrontation with Count Olaf which woke up all the patrons, Frank and Ernest were charged by Justice Strauss to put the Baudelaires in room 121 and Count Olaf in room 165 until her fellow judges arrive. As both of them are blindfolded for the trial as well, it was not known which one brought the Baudelaires to where the blindfolded trial is. During the trial, Frank and Ernest submitted a commonplace book as evidence. When Count Olaf starts the fire at the Hotel Denouement, Frank and Ernest were last seen on the first floor as the Woman With Hair But No Beard directs them to the elevator where the Baudelaires, Count Olaf, and Justice Strauss are. When Violet asks for them to call the fire department, Frank and Ernest ask "which one" as the elevator closes on them.

Their names are a reference to the phrase "You be frank and I'll be earnest."

In the TV series, Frank and Ernest are both portrayed by Max Greenfield. Frank and Ernest's roles in the TV series became more important. Ernest and Count Olaf capture Larry Your-Waiter at the hotel's Indian restaurant and boil him alive in a pot of curry. As for Frank, he's the one who brought Olaf back into Hotel Denouement following the death of Dewey and locked him in room 170 (the Dewey Decimal number for ethics).

=== Animals ===
There are different animals that appear in this franchise and are listed in order of appearance:

==== Incredibly Deadly Viper ====
The Incredibly Deadly Viper (also known as Ink and Inky) is a snake that was discovered by Montgomery Montgomery.

In The Reptile Room, Inky was presented to the Baudelaire children as Montgomery's latest discovery where it bonded with Sunny. When Count Olaf posed as Stephano and killed Montgomery while framing Inky, the Baudelaire children were able to prove its innocence and expose Stephano as Count Olaf. After Count Olaf and the Hook-Handed Man got away, Inky was among the reptiles that were packed up by Bruce to be sent to the Herpetology Society.

In The End, Inky arrived on the island with a pregnant Kit Snicket who revealed that Inky lived on the island before being "discovered" by Montgomery. Following Count Olaf and Kit Snicket's deaths, Inky rounded up the type of apples that were mixed with normal apples and horseradishes in order to give them to the departed castaways following their infection of the Medusoid Mycelium.

In the film, Count Olaf as Stephano pinned the blame of Montgomery's death on the Incredibly Deadly Viper to Mr. Poe and the Constable. This plot was foiled when Sunny plays with it causing Count Olaf and the Hook-Handed Man to secretly get away while shedding their disguise on their way out.

In the TV series, Count Olaf as Stephano pinned the blame of Montgomery's death on the Incredibly Deadly Viper to Mr. Poe with the help of the Person of Indeterminate Gender posing as Nurse Lucafont while the rest of Count Olaf's troupe posed as members of the Sheriff Department. Just like the book, Violet finds the vial containing the Mamba du Mal venom in Stephano's briefcase. Lemony Snicket postulated that Inky was catching up to the castaways.

==== Mamba du Mal ====
The Mamba du Mal is a snake in Montgomery Montgomery's collection which is "one of the deadliest snakes in the hemisphere" that kills its victims by strangling them.

In The Reptile Room, Count Olaf in his alias of Stephano used its venom to kill Montgomery and frame the Incredibly Deadly Viper for the death. After Count Olaf was exposed and the Incredibly Deadly Viper was innocent, the Mamba du Mal is among the reptiles that are packed up by Bruce in order to take them to the Herpetology Society.

While the Mamba du Mal does not appear in the film, its venom was used in the TV series during the final parts of "The Reptile Room" Pt. 1. When Stephano talks about the Mamba du Mal in the second part, it shifts to a snake that might be the Mamba du Mal. Either way, it alongside the other creatures in Montgomery's collection are claimed by the Herpetology Society in light of Montgomery's death.

==== Lachrymose Leech ====
The Lachrymose Leech is a type of leech that lives in the waters of Lake Lachrymose where they have six rows of sharp teeth, a sharp pointed nose, and a smell of food. As they are blind, the Lachrymose Leeches can attack any human who has just eaten something as well as their usual food of small fish and crabs. Anyone traveling on the lake must wait one hour after eating before entering it for any reason.

In The Wide Window, Josephine Anwhistle mentioned that she lost her husband Ike to the Lachrymose Leeches when he waited 45 minutes before going swimming. When the Baudelaire children and Josephine were leaving Curdled Cave by water, the Baudelaires did not know that Josephine ate a banana which started to attract the Lachrymose Leeches. As their boat is attacked by the Lachrymose Leeches, Violet invents a signal light that attracts a passing boat. However, the boat is operated by Count Olaf in the alias of Captain Sham. When Josephine begs for Captain Sham to spare her, he got irritated with Josephine and pushed her into the water where the Lachrymose Leeches are.

In The Beatrice Letters, there was a Lachrymose Leech paperweight that Ike Anwhistle gave Lemony Snicket as a graduation present.

In the film, the Baudelaires were rescued from the Lachrymose Leeches by Count Olaf who left Josephine to her fate.

In the TV series, the Baudelaires were rescued from the Lachrymose Leeches by Captain Sham and the disguised members of Count Olaf's troupe.

==== V.F.D. Crows ====
The V.F.D. Crows are a type of crows that are worshipped by the Village of Fowl Devotees and have the same migratory pattern every day. The #1 rule in the Village of Fowl Devotees is to never harm a crow.

In The Vile Village, Esmé Squalor in the alias of Officer Luciana accidentally harmed a crow when she fired a harpoon gun at the books that the Quagmire children were throwing to the Baudelaire children. This incited the wrath of the villagers causing Count Olaf and Esmé to flee.

==== Volunteer Feline Detectives ====
The Volunteer Feline Detectives are a group of lions that lived in the caves of the Mortmain Mountains. They were trained by the V.F.D. to smell out smoke. At some point following the Schism, the fire-starting side of the V.F.D. gained possession of the lions. On a related note, one of Gustav Sebald's movies was called Lions in the Mountains which references these lions and their habitat in the Mortmain Mountains.

In The Carnivorous Carnival, Count Olaf whipped and abused them enough for them to have scars where the Baudelaire children noticed that as they can see the ribs of one of them due to them being lethargic and malnourished. When Count Olaf put on a show at the Caligari Carnival, he held an event where one of its freaks would be fed to the lions. During the crowd chaos, Olivia Caliban and the Bald Man with the Big Nose were knocked into the lion pit and devoured by the lions. When the Caligari Carnival is burned by Count Olaf, the lions perished in the fire as Count Olaf neglected to get them out of the pit. Lemony Snicket stated that the lions' bodies were blackened when he found them. It was not mentioned what happened to the remaining lions in the Volunteer Feline Detectives.

In the TV series, a group of starving lions lurk in the haunts near the Caligari Carnival. Two of the lions were captured by Count Olaf for his lion-feeding event. Just like the book, the lions perished in the Caligari Carnival's fire.

==== Snow Gnats ====
The Snow Gnats are small flying insects that inhabit the Mortmain Mountains. Similar to red ants, they enjoy stinging people for no reason. There are two ways to prevent Snow Gnats from stinging people. One is to create smoke by starting a fire since Snow Gnats hate smoke. Another way is to cover the entire body so that they would not attack.

In The Slippery Slope, the Snow Gnats are first seen attacking Violet and Klaus. They managed to find shelter in a cave where Bruce, Carmelita Spats, and the Snow Scouts are taking refuge in.

The Snow Gnats appear in the TV series.

==== V.F.D. Eagles ====
The V.F.D. Eagles are a type of eagle that are used by the fire-starting side of the V.F.D. They bend to their whim upon hearing their whistles.

In The Slippery Slope, the V.F.D. Eagles are summoned by Count Olaf to carry off Bruce and the Snow Scouts. The Man with a Beard But No Hair and the Woman with Hair But No Beard escaped on some of them.

In The End, it was mentioned that the V.F.D. Eagles have attacked Hector's self-sustaining hot-air mobile home causing it to crash into the Queequeg. This was foreshadowed by Kit Snicket in The Penultimate Peril where Quigley Quagmire used a homemade net to save his fellow siblings.

The V.F.D. Eagles appear in the TV series.

==== Great Unknown/Bombinating Beast ====
The Great Unknown is a question mark-shaped sea monster that is said to be the same as the Bombinating Beast. It swims in the oceans that are near the city and is described by Captain Widdershins to be worse than Count Olaf.

In The Grim Grotto, the Great Unknown is said to be larger than the Queequeg and the Carmelita.

In The End, Kit mentions to the Baudelaires that the Quagmires, Hector, Captain Widdershins, Fiona, and Fernald were said to have been swallowed up by the Great Unknown. It is unknown whether it saved or killed them.

== Other characters ==
=== Poe family ===
==== Edgar and Albert Poe ====
- The Bad Beginning

Edgar and Albert are Mr. Poe's two sons. They are only seen in The Bad Beginning when the Baudelaires stay with Mr. Poe following their parents' death. The two brothers are unwelcoming to the Baudelaire orphans. Their names are apparent allusions to Edgar Allan Poe, though they may also be derived from Edgar Albert Guest (who is mentioned in The Grim Grotto).

In the TV series, Edgar (11 Years Old) and Albert (17 Years Old) are portrayed by Kaniel Jacob-Cross and Jack Forrester, respectively. Their unwelcoming attitude goes so far that they both think the Baudelaires caused the fire themselves. Lemony Snicket reveals that later in life one became a banker like their father while the other lives in a cave, but that both think that "the other has it better."

==== Eleanora Poe ====
Eleanora Poe is the sister of Mr. Arthur Poe, who is in charge of the Baudelaire orphans' affairs. Eleanora is the editor-in-chief of The Daily Punctilio. She is first mentioned as "a tiresome woman named Eleanora" who was in an elevator at the Hotel Preludio with the Baudelaire family one day when Bertrand played a prank that forced her to stop at every floor on the way to her hotel room.

It is implied that Eleanora and Arthur are not part of the V.F.D. organization because at The Anxious Clown, Larry the Waiter uses a code for V.F.D. members. Neither Eleanora nor Arthur seem to understand it or decide to ignore it.

In Lemony Snicket: The Unauthorized Biography, she once fired Lemony Snicket for giving a "bad" review about Al Funcoot's play titled "One Last Warning to Those Who Stand in My Way" and Esmé Squalor. Eleanora was eventually locked in the basement of the newspaper building by her "star reporter" Geraldine Julienne on the orders of Esmé. She tried to telegram her brother only for an imposter to tell Mr. Poe to ignore all incoming telegrams. This was likely to secure the influence of the newspaper for the villainous side of V.F.D.

In the TV series, her character is changed to be Mr. Poe's wife upon being amalgamated with Polly Poe and she is portrayed by Cleo King. She is shown to be more concerned with the Baudelaires' fame in the papers than their actual living conditions. In addition, she has used the "Wait until the readers of the Daily Punctilio hear this!" catchphrase that Geraldine uses. In "The Vile Village", Eleanora arrives at the Village of Fowl Devotees to get the news on the Baudelaires having "murdered" Count Olaf. Arthur was surprised by her appearance and stated that they should've carpooled. She even joins in the villagers pursuing of them and the Quagmires in order to get an interview from them. Her story about Count Olaf's "death" makes the front page of the Daily Punctilio. In "The End", it is shown years later following the death of Count Olaf that the Daily Punctilio is printing out its last issue with its front picture implying that Eleanora Poe has been arrested for false reporting and unethical practices as seen on the final issue being read by a patron at Old Ed's Soda Shop.

==== Polly Poe ====
Polly Poe is Arthur Poe's wife. She is mentioned in The Bad Beginning when the Baudelaires stay with the Poe family. While the Baudelaires stay at the Poes' house, she buys a lot of itchy and ugly clothing. She later appears at the theater for Count Olaf's performance of The Marvelous Marriage and was there when Count Olaf's plot was exposed.

In The Ersatz Elevator, Mr. Poe says that he will tell his wife that dark is in, indicating that she is interested in fashion.

In the film, she is played by Deborah Theaker.

In the television series, her character is combined with Eleanora Poe who is portrayed by Cleo King.

=== Justice Strauss ===
Justice Strauss
- A Series of Unfortunate Events character
- First appearance: The Bad Beginning
- Last appearance: The Penultimate Peril
- Portrayed by: Catherine O'Hara (film); Joan Cusack (TV series)
- Occupation: Judge

Justice Strauss is a judge who lives next door to Count Olaf. The Baudelaires take a liking to her as soon as they meet in The Bad Beginning and they use her library to foil Count Olaf's plot to get the Baudelaire fortune. At the purported mock wedding that Olaf sets up at the theater, she plays the judge and almost legally marries Violet to Olaf. At the end of the book following Count Olaf and his troupe getting away, she offers to look after the Baudelaires but Mr. Poe informs them that this would be in violation of the will of the Baudelaire parents.

Strauss reappears in The Penultimate Peril. She has been researching the Baudelaire case and attempts to bring Count Olaf to justice. Justice Strauss and Jerome Squalor meet up with Dewey Denouement and the Baudelaires at Hotel Denouement where they are confronted in the lobby by Count Olaf and his remaining associates. After Dewey Denouement is accidentally killed, Justice Strauss breaks up the commotion between the guests. She informs everyone present that the authorities have been summoned and that they will have a trial on the Baudelaire children and Count Olaf.

During the trial, Justice Strauss has all the participants and attendees wear blindfolds in order to comply with adage "Justice is blind". Over the course of the trial, it is revealed that her two fellow High Court judges are associates of Count Olaf, the Man with a Beard But No Hair and the Woman with Hair but No Beard. Olaf kidnaps Justice Strauss and takes her to the roof of the hotel. The Baudelaire children follow and inadvertently set fire to the building as they try to signal to the other volunteers that Hotel Denouement is no longer safe. Ultimately, Count Olaf and the Baudelaires escape together, leaving Justice Strauss behind, although it is left unclear whether or not she is able to evacuate safely.

Justice Strauss is portrayed by Catherine O'Hara in the film, Joan Cusack in the Netflix series and voiced by April Stewart in the video game adaptation.

In the Netflix series, Justice Strauss' library is shown to have a book on secret societies. Additionally in the series, Justice Strauss is confirmed to have made it out of the burning Hotel Denouement as she gives a picture of the Baudelaire children to Lemony Snicket.

=== Gustav Sebald ===
Gustav Sebald is a film director and member of the V.F.D. He or a member of his family created the Sebald Code, as part of V.F.D. correspondence.

In The Reptile Room, Gustav is described as the assistant of Montgomery Montgomery. When Count Olaf arrives at Montgomery's house disguised as Stephano, Montgomery is informed that Gustav has suddenly and suspiciously resigned. Gustav's movie "Zombies in the Snow" was seen at Tedia's local theater by the Baudelaire children, Montgomery, and Stephano. Following Gustav's death, his sister Sally manages his estate.

In the film, Gustav Sebald is portrayed by John Dexter. He was briefly seen having been strapped to the front of a train by Count Olaf.

In the TV series, Gustav Sebald is portrayed by Luke Camilleri. He first appears in "The Bad Beginning Pt. 2" where he meets Jacquelyn underground after she escapes from the Bald Man's trap and informs him what happened. Jacquelyn and Gustav inform the children that their parents had intended for Montgomery to take them in, and not Count Olaf. Gustav is soon killed by Count Olaf with a tranquilizer dart. Gustav reappears in "The Carnivorous Carnival" Pt. 1, in a flashback scene depicting a celebration at V.F.D. headquarters. He also appears in training videos for movie codes and disguises.

=== Larry ===
Larry is a waiter who works at the "Anxious Clown" restaurant in The Wide Window who is implied to be a member of V.F.D. as he uses the coded phrase "I didn't realize this was a sad occasion." He also has a history with Josephine Anwhistle.

He first appears where he serves food to the Baudelaire children, Mr. Poe, and Count Olaf in his alias of Captain Sham.

In Lemony Snicket: The Unauthorized Autobiography, a letter Lemony received from Jacques advised him to visit The Anxious Clown and look for a waiter who quoted "I didn't realize this was a sad occasion."

In the Netflix TV series, Larry is portrayed by Patrick Breen. He was first seen in "The Wide Window" sweeping outside his restaurant when Count Olaf appears. Count Olaf manages to overpower Larry as the rest of his troupe swarms over him. While Count Olaf in the disguise of Captain Sham has dinner at the Anxious Restaurant with Mr. Poe and the Baudelaire children, Larry serves them food as Count Olaf's theater troupe makes sure that he sticks to the script. While struggling to get untied, he does managed to answer a call from Mr. and Mrs. Quagmire. When the Hook-Handed Man grabbed the phone, Mr. and Mrs. Quagmire hung up knowing that the Anxious Clown has been compromised. In "The Austere Academy", Larry appears as a cafeteria worker at Prufrock Preporatory school where he misplaced a book about secret societies that Jacquelyn gave him. He gets locked in the walk-in refrigerator by Count Olaf and is later freed by Jacques Snicket. In "The Ersatz Elevator" Pt. 1, Larry appears as a waiter at Café Salmonella where he stalls Esmé while Jacques and Olivia sneak into their building to find Duncan and Isadora Quagmire. In "The Vile Village" Pt. 2, Larry hears about Jacques' death and assists Jacquelyn into distracting the Village of Fowl Devotees' inhabitants in order to give the Baudelaires time to get away from them. He was shown to have a history with Mrs. Morrow and Mr. Lesko, and Mrs. Morrow had a book club with his “mothers”, implied to be his caretakers. It is unknown whether they are related to each other, or unbiological, and they may be twin sisters Zada and Zora. Though they are tied up by Count Olaf's troupe, Larry and Jacquelyn are pleased that the Baudelaire children and the Quagmire children successfully got away in their own ways. In "The Carnivorous Carnival" Pt. 1, Larry was seen in a flashback at a party at V.F.D. HQ where he has a message passed along to Lemony Snicket that tells him "Olaf knows" as Lemony runs out in an attempt to thwart Count Olaf's attempt on Beatrice Baudelaire's life. In the present, he appears on a film reel at the Caligari Carnival that talks about the V.F.D. as he talks about the different coded phrases. While in the tunnels, he is on the phone with someone about the survivor of the Baudelaire fire being sighted at the Mortmain Mountains when he starts to smell smoke. In "The Penultimate Peril", Larry works at Hotel Denouement's Indian restaurant. With help from Ernest Denouement, Count Olaf captures Larry and boils him alive in a pot of curry. His death was confirmed in more than one Facebook post.

=== Phil ===
- The Miserable Mill
- The Grim Grotto

Phil worked at the Lucky Smells Lumbermill in The Miserable Mill. Phil was one of the friendlier mill workers, and helped the Baudelaires adjust to their new home. During the Baudelaires' stay at the lumbermill, Phil was injured by a mill machine, operated by Klaus, who was hypnotized at the time. On the bright side, Phil is an eternally optimistic character who is not upset about the accident, by saying things such as "at least no one would ask whether I'm right-handed or left-handed."

In The Grim Grotto, Phil worked as a cook at a submarine crewed by Captain Widdershins (who calls him Cookie) and his stepdaughter Fiona although all he can make are damp casseroles. Klaus believes that Phil is still being affected by the stamping machine accident upon seeing his limp, but Phil claims it to be a shark bite. He, along with Captain Widdershins, abandons the Baudelaires and Fiona during the middle of the novel for unknown reasons (or had been captured), and does not appear in The Penultimate Peril or The End.

It is suspected that Phil may have left his work at Lucky Smells Lumbermill due to a lack of sufficient pay; in The Miserable Mill he states that he has read law books and learned that being paid with coupons is illegal. Despite bringing this up with Sir, it is stated in The Penultimate Peril the workers at the mill are still being paid in coupons.

In the TV series, he is portrayed by Chris Gauthier. His roles in "The Miserable Mill" and "The Grim Grotto" are intact except for the fact that he later sported a peg leg where his injury was after an encounter with a shark.

=== Dr. Georgina Orwell ===
- The Miserable Mill

Dr. Georgina Orwell is an optometrist and an accomplice to Count Olaf in his attempts to steal the Baudelaire fortune in The Miserable Mill by hypnotizing Klaus after the Bald Man with the Big Nose posing as Foreman Flacutano breaks his glasses. Her name is an allusion to George Orwell. She is killed when she falls into a gigantic lumber saw while battling Sunny, sword vs. teeth.

In the TV series, she is portrayed by Catherine O'Hara (who previously portrayed Justice Strauss in the film adaptation). Instead of being killed by the gigantic lumber saw, she falls into the furnace where all that was left of her was her glasses. In "The Carnivorous Carnival" Pt. 1, Georgina made an appearance in a flashback at the celebration at the V.F.D. headquarters the day when Count Olaf failed at murdering Beatrice. She hypnotized Gustav into kissing her and had to cover up this act in front of Jacquelyn. In the present, she appears on a film reel at the Caligari Carnival that talks about the V.F.D. The newspaper clippings in "The Penultimate Peril" Pt. 2 state that Georgina's death occurred the same time as the Quagmire house fire.

=== Mr. Remora ===
- The Austere Academy
- The Penultimate Peril

Mr. Remora is a teacher at Prufrock Preparatory School in The Austere Academy teaching Violet Baudelaire. He loves bananas and is constantly seen eating one, smearing banana pulp on his moustache. In his class, students are forced to listen to tiresome and extremely short stories he dictates after which he gives examinations on various objective aspects of the stories. He thinks that the Baudelaires are good students and even objected to Vice-Principal Nero expelling them.

Lemony Snicket reveals in Lemony Snicket: The Unauthorized Autobiography that Mr. Remora later retired from his teaching job because he choked on a banana and was briefly replaced by Kit Snicket under the alias of Miss K.

Whether retired or not depending on when the banana-choking incident happened, Mr. Remora reappears in The Penultimate Peril staying in room 371 with Vice-Principal Nero and Mrs. Bass, having been invited to a cocktail party at the Hotel Denouement by "J.S." and makes a brief reference to running from the law (possibly a reference to Mrs. Bass's bank robbery). Mr. Remora stated that the invitation he got stated that there be an all you can eat banana buffet. When Sunny brought Vice-Principal Nero, Mr. Remora and Mrs. Bass to the Indian restaurant, Hal tries to communicate with Mr. Remora using a V.F.D. coded phrase "I didn't realize this was a sad occasion." However, Mr. Remora fails to understand, meaning that he is probably not part of V.F.D., and commented to Hal "it won't be a sad occasion if you feed us." When making his order, Mr. Remora orders 48 orders of fried bananas. When Dewey Denouement is accidentally killed during a confrontation with Count Olaf which woke up all the patrons, Mr. Remora chose the side of the Baudelaire children where he mentioned good things about them which Vice-Principal Nero mimicked. During the blindfolded trial, Mr. Remora submits the gradebooks as evidence. When Count Olaf starts the fire at the Hotel Denouement, Mr. Remora was last seen wandering the seventh story with Nero while wondering about fried bananas.

In the TV series, Mr. Remora is portrayed by Malcolm Stewart. During the pep rally, he and Mrs. Bass shoot down Duncan and Isadora's attempts to warn the Baudelaires that Count Olaf is in the school. He later assists Vice-Principal Nero and Mrs. Bass in giving the Baudelaires their exam. Unlike the books, Mr. Remora made an appearance in "The Carnivorous Carnival" Pt. 2 attending the Caligari Carnival with Mrs. Bass where they watched the lion-feeding event. He mentions that he has a skin condition when someone mistakes him for a freak. His role in "The Penultimate Peril" has been omitted.

=== Mrs. Bass ===
- The Austere Academy
- The Penultimate Peril

Mrs. Bass is Klaus Baudelaire's teacher in The Austere Academy, obsessed with measuring in metric and all of her lessons are on measuring certain items. Mrs. Bass is described as having long, messy hair that vaguely made her resemble a gorilla. She and Mr. Remora only agree that Violet and Klaus are good students after their final examination that would determine their expulsion from Prufrock Preparatory. Prior to this, however, they were under the impression that Violet and Klaus were the two worst students in the history of the school. Mrs. Bass at this occasion states that she dislikes Carmelita Spats.

She reappears in The Penultimate Peril where she is staying at Hotel Denouement in room 371 with Vice-Principal Nero and Mr. Remora. Mrs. Bass was wearing a thin black mask and a small white wig as a disguise. It is implied, as foreshadowed in The Austere Academy and Lemony Snicket: The Unauthorized Autobiography, that she has robbed a bank, having in her possession several bags of money marked with name of Mulctuary Money Management. It is also implied that the money she stole is from the Spats Fortune. She makes no attempt to conceal her crime from Vice Principal Nero and Mr. Remora and they in turn do not judge her, seeming to look on her robbery as an everyday occurrence. She also reveals that her invitation to the cocktail party hosted by "J.S." which asked her to bring all her valuables and since she did not earn enough as a teacher to have valuables, she was forced to turn to a life of crime which Nero mimicked. Mrs. Bass stated that her invitation stated that there will be a party to celebrate the metric system. When being served by Hal at the Hotel Denouement's Indian restaurant, Mrs. Bass orders 10 grams of rice, 1/10 of a hectogram of shrimp vindaloo, a decagram of chana aloo masala, 1,000 centigrams of tandoori salmon, 4 samosas with the surface area of 19 cubic centimeters, 5 deciliters of mango lassi, and a sada rava dosai that is 19 centimeters long. Despite her defense of the Baudelaires in The Austere Academy when their own identities are revealed at the Hotel Denouement following the death of Dewey Denouement, she claims that they are criminals that should be punished. During the blindfolded trial, Mrs. Bass submits the blueprints for banks and later claims that the Baudelaires robbed a bank to which Mr. Poe quoted "Who said that?" When Count Olaf starts a fire at the Hotel Denouement, Mrs. Bass was last seen on the third story muttering something about a getaway car.

It is assumed that she survives the fire because it is mentioned in The Austere Academy that she was arrested for bank robbery at Mulctuary Money Management by Lemony Snicket which is one of the reasons why Prufrock Preparatory School closed down.

In the TV series, Mrs. Bass is portrayed by BJ Harrison. This version is an African-American woman and does not have messy hair. During the pep rally, she and Mr. Remora shoot down Duncan and Isadora's attempts to warn the Baudelaires that Count Olaf is in the school. She later assists Vice-Principal Nero and Mr. Remora into giving the Baudelaires their exam. Like the books, she starts to become a bank robber. Unlike the books, Mrs. Bass appeared in "The Carnivorous Carnival" Pt. 2 attending the Caligari Carnival with Mr. Remora where they watched the lion-feeding event. She is shown to have a bag of money in her hands which she passes off as quiz papers. While the Caligari Carnival was burning down, she hitches a ride with Mr. Poe where she wants him to give her a "tour" of Mulctuary Money Management. In "The Slippery Slope" Pt. 1, Mrs. Bass uses Mr. Poe as a hostage during her robbery until police officers come through the roof and arrest Mrs. Bass. Mr. Poe quotes to Mrs. Bass as she is taken away that he will stay in touch.

=== Ms. Tench ===
Ms. Tench is the gym teacher at Prufrock Preparatory School.

She was mentioned in The Austere Academy where Vice-Principal Nero stated that Ms. Tench "fell out of a third-story window a few days ago." Though it was not mentioned if she is dead or injured. Either way, she was replaced by Count Olaf posing as Coach Genghis.

In the TV series, Miss Tench is portrayed by Bronwen Smith. While riding a bus with the pep squad and sports team, the bus is hijacked by Count Olaf. While it was mentioned that Count Olaf and his troupe left Ms. Tench, the pep squad and sports team, and the bus driver on the side of the road, Count Olaf's disguise as Coach Genghis seems to include her stolen tracksuit.

=== Mr. and Mrs. Quagmire ===
Mr. and Mrs. Quagmire are the parents of Duncan, Isadora, and Quigley Quagmire who are on the fire-fighting side of the V.F.D. They perished in the fire at their home after getting their children to safety.

In the TV series, Mr. and Mrs. Quagmire are portrayed by Will Arnett and Cobie Smulders. Their subplot throughout the first season had them captured by the fire-starting side of the V.F.D. and their escape as they make their way back to their kids. During a flight over Lake Lachrymose, the two of them managed to secretly help the Baudelaires set off a signal light at the time when they are being attacked by the Lachrymose Leeches. Mr. and Mrs. Quagmire were able to reunite with their children. Later that night, an unseen person starts to set fire to their mansion from a distance causing Mr. and Mrs. Quagmire to perish offscreen. Viewers were initially led to believe they were the Baudelaires' parents.

=== Council of Elders ===
- The Vile Village

The Council of Elders are the governing force behind the Village of Fowl Devotees. It consists of the village's 25 elders. Each of the members of the Council of Elders worship the crows and wear hats that have fake crows on top of their hats. They sit on a long bench in the Village of Fowl Devotees' City Hall to discuss some things. The youngest member of the Council of Elders was The Woman Who Was About Eighty-One. Some of the laws they enforced are no murder, no harming the crows, no villains allowed, no mechanical devices, no books on mechanical devices, only police officers can talk on the platform, and the Council of Elders' hot fudge sundae can only have 15 nuts on them.

In The Vile Village, the Council of Elders meet the Baudelaire children during an assembly and ask who would watch over them. They got Hector to watch over them because nobody else wanted the job. When Count Olaf in the alias of Detective Dupin and Esmé Squalor in the alias of Officer Luciana frame the Baludelaires for the murder of "Count Olaf (who was actually Jacques Snicket), the Council of Elders sentences them to be burned at the stake. The Council of Elders join the villagers into pursuing the Baudelaires and the Quagmires even when Hector's mobile home appears in the sky. After someone sees Detective Dupin without his sunglasses, some members of the Council of Elders struggled with him to see if there is an eye-shaped tattoo on him where they got his green plastic shoe off. In addition, the Council of Elders are among those who get angry at Officer Luciana when she was discovered to have harmed a crow with one of the harpoons from the harpoon gun. After Count Olaf and Esmé escape on a motorcycle, a member of the Council of Elders tells the Baudelaires to stay put as they are still going to be burned at the stake for the rules they broke right after the villagers take the injured crow to the V.F.D. veterinarian.

In the TV series, the Council of Elders only has three members. They are named Anabelle, Jemma, and Sam and are portrayed by Mindy Sterling, Carol Mansell, and Ken Jenkins respectively. Anabelle is the one who quotes "silence" when someone breaks the rule that states "No one may talk while on the platform" even when asked a question that is rephrased to the other villagers. Though she would overlook it if the person on the platform is a police officer or a bank consultant. Jemma is the soft-spoken of the Council of Elders while Sam has a gruff voice. In "The Penultimate Peril" Pt. 2, Jemma is present at the trial of the Baudelaires and Count Olaf. She claimed that the Baudelaires murdered Count Olaf and answered Count Olaf's question to her by stating "That baby busted 'em out of jail!" In addition, she was surprised that the over-peppered sausages that Esmé and Carmelita shared during the trial were made from crow where she thought they were made from chickens.

=== Mrs. Morrow ===
- The Vile Village
- The Penultimate Peril

Mrs. Morrow is a citizen from the Village of Fowl Devotees in The Vile Village. Her name is seemingly an allusion to the character of the same name in the novel, The Catcher in the Rye.

She is seen at Town Hall wearing a pink bathrobe when the Baudelaires arrive. She is one of the people who does not want the Baudelaires living with her. Mrs. Morrow makes them trim her hedges and later complains about their poor job. Mrs. Morrow delivers the news about Jacques Snicket's mysterious death whom she, like the other villagers, thought was Count Olaf. Mrs. Morrow is one of the villagers most determined to burn the Baudelaires (and any other person in violation of the many thousands of village rules) at the stake. She was with the villagers when Esmé Squalor in the alias of Officer Luciana accidentally injured a crow with her harpoon gun and was among the villagers that retaliated at this rule violation. After Count Olaf and Esmé got away, Mrs. Morrow and the rest of the villagers took the injured crow to the V.F.D. veterinarian.

She reappears in The Penultimate Peril as a guest at Hotel Denouement alongside Mr. Lesko. Mrs. Morrow was awoken up by a shot from the harpoon gun that killed Dewey Denouement. When Charles states to Sir that Count Olaf caused accidents at the Lucky Smells Lumbermill and not the Baudelaire children, Mrs. Morrow stated that "Count Olaf" was murdered by the Baudelaire children in her village. She submits constitutions to be used as evidence at the blindfolded trial for the Baudelaires and Count Olaf. When Count Olaf starts a fire at the Hotel Denouement, Mrs. Morrow was last seen on one of the floors arguing with Mr. Lesko.

In the TV series, Mrs. Morrow is portrayed by Lossen Chambers. While helping Jacquelyn buy the Baudelaires and the Quagmire's time to get away, Larry mentioned to Mrs. Morrow that he remembered her and her mother from book club. Mrs. Morrow stated that it's now a magazine club and she hates magazines. Her part in "The Penultimate Peril" is omitted.

=== Mr. Lesko ===
- The Vile Village
- The Penultimate Peril

Mr. Lesko is a citizen of the Village of Fowl Devotees from The Vile Village. His name is seemingly an allusion to American author, Matthew Lesko.

The Baudelaires first meet him at a meeting in Town Hall where he is shown wearing plaid pants. He and several other citizens do not want the Baudelaires to live with him and describes them as "noisy" children. Mr. Lesko is very mean to them and makes them and Hector clean the windows of his house. He is the one who suggests the Baudelaires be burned at the stake because he thinks they killed Count Olaf (who was actually Jacques Snicket). In addition, Mr. Lesko was also shown to have knowledge on motorcycle safety. Mr. Lesko was with the villagers when Esmé Squalor in the alias of Officer Luciana accidentally injured a crow with her harpoon gun and was among the villagers that retaliated at this rule violation. After Count Olaf and Esmé got away, Mr. Lesko and the rest of the villagers took the injured crow to the V.F.D. veterinarian.

He returns in The Penultimate Peril where he was seen with Mrs. Morrow. He is woken up when Dewey Denouement is killed. When Mrs. Morrow claims that "Count Olaf" was killed by the Baudelaire children in her village, Mr. Lesko claims that he thought the man that was killed was named "Count Omar." At the Baudelaires and Count Olaf's blindfolded trial, he hands in rule books for evidence. When Count Olaf starts the fire at the Hotel Denouement, Mr. Lesko was last seen on one of the floors arguing with Mrs. Morrow.

In the TV series, Mr. Lesko is portrayed by Kevin Chamberlin and is first referred to as "The Man in Plaid Pants" by the Council of Elders. While helping Jacquelyn buy the Baudelaires and the Quagmire's time to get away, Larry asked Mr. Lesko how his retirement was. He did not get an answer out of him. His part in "The Penultimate Peril" is omitted.

=== Jacques Snicket ===
- The Vile Village

Jacques Snicket is the older brother of Lemony Snicket and the twin brother of Kit Snicket as well as a member of the V.F.D. At some point during his work, he lost contact with Lemony and remained close to Kit.

Jacques was first seen in The Vile Village where the villagers of the Village of Fowl Devotees mistook him for Count Olaf. He was to be burned at the stake only to be killed by the real Count Olaf (who was disguised as Detective Dupin at the time) who framed the Baudelaire siblings for his death. Before he died, he tried to mention to the Baudelaire children that he worked for the V.F.D.

In the Netflix TV series, Jacques Snicket is portrayed by Nathan Fillion. He is first seen in "The Austere Academy" where he frees Larry from the walk-in refrigerator that Count Olaf trapped him in. In "The Ersatz Elevator," Jacquelyn enlists Jacques Snicket to bring Olivia Caliban into their organization. While Esmé is kept busy by Larry at Café Salmonella, Jacques and Olivia sneak into the Squalors' building to find Duncan and Isadora Quagmire. When Count Olaf in the form of Gunther holds an auction, Jacques and Olivia attend it. In "The Vile Village," Jacques and Olivia arrive in the Village of Fowl Devotees in order to detain Count Olaf. Unfortunately, Count Olaf poses as Detective Dupin where he fools the villagers into thinking that Jacques Snicket is actually Olaf and the Council of Elders sentence Jacques to death. While Jacques still had the V.F.D. tattoo, Count Olaf put a fake extension between his eyebrows to make it look like one eyebrow. He did silently introduce himself to the Baudelaires and explain the tattoo description to them while Detective Dupin and the Council of Elders were talking. After Olivia negotiates with Esmé in the disguise of Officer Luciana for their freedom in exchange for the information about the Sugar Bowl that Count Olaf seeks, Jacques sends Olivia to find "Madame Lulu." When Jacques confronts Count Olaf and Esmé, they managed to incapacitate him as Count Olaf struck him with a crowbar offscreen. The next day, the Baudelaires are informed that "Count Olaf" was murdered. Olaf as Detective Dupin pins the blame of his death on the Baudelaires. In "The Hostile Hospital" Pt. 1 and 2, Jacques Snicket appeared on a film reel that is in Heimlich Hospital's Library of records. In "The Carnivorous Carnival" Pt. 1, Jacques Snicket was seen in a flashback at a party at the V.F.D. Headquarters with Lemony. In the present, he appears on a film reel at the Caligari Carnival that talks about the V.F.D. In "The Penultimate Peril" Pt. 1, Count Olaf poses as Jacques Snicket when he speaks with Mr. Poe in Hotel Denouement's Indian restaurant.

=== Geraldine Julienne ===
- The Hostile Hospital
- The Carnivorous Carnival
- The Penultimate Peril

Geraldine Julienne is the star reporter for the Daily Punctilio. She is depicted as always carrying a microphone and incorrectly reports on events throughout the series. In addition, Geraldine is a devoted fan of Esmé Squalor. Her catchphrase upon coming across a headline is "Wait until the readers of the Daily Punctilio see that!"

She was first mentioned in The Vile Village where she wrote the inaccurate article about the Baudelaire children murdering Count Olaf. What really happened is that Count Olaf framed them at the time when Jacques Snicket was mistaken for Count Olaf.

In The Hostile Hospital, Geraldine is present at Violet Baudelaire's surgery.

In The Carnivorous Carnival, Geraldine appears at the Caligari Carnival reporting on the lion show there.

In The Penultimate Peril, Geraldine is seen at the Hotel Denouement. She was seen in the rooftop sunbathing salon with Esmé Squalor and Carmelita Spats. When Dewey Denouement is accidentally killed during a confrontation with Count Olaf which woke up all the patrons, Geraldine quotes that the Baudelaires are no ordinary murderers. When Justice Strauss proposes a blindfolded trial, she did not want Geraldine to do any premature news stories. During the blindfolded trial, Geraldine submitted some newspaper articles as evidence. When Count Olaf starts the fire at the Hotel Denouement, Geraldine was last seen on one of the floors using her microphone as a cane while squealing about the headlines.

In Lemony Snicket: The Unauthorized Autobiography, Esmé orders Geraldine to lock Eleanora Poe in the basement of the Daily Punctilio.

In the TV series, Geraldine Julienne had written different articles in the series like the loss of the Baudelaire children's parents, them being raised by Count Olaf, and the accident at the Lucky Smells Lumbermill. Her parts in the TV series are divided among Eleanora Poe (particularly Geraldine's catchphrase) and Vice-Principal Nero (who is the vice-president of the Esmé Squalor fan club instead and says the lines that Geraldine says).

=== Milt ===
- The Hostile Hospital

Milt is the shopkeeper at the Last Chance General Store.

He first appears in The Hostile Hospital when the Baudelaires appear the Last Chance General Store after escaping from the Village of Fowl Devotees. He gives them cranberry muffins. When Lou shows up with the newspapers from the Daily Punctilio talking about the Baudelaires murdering "Count Olaf", Milt and Lou try to catch them only for the Baudelaires to escape into the van of the Volunteers Fighting Disease.

In the TV series, Milt is portrayed by Serge Houde. Like the book, he meets the Baudelaires when they arrive at his store. Instead of Milt recognizing them from the newspaper, the Baudelaires leave when Count Olaf shows up, though he still gets the newspapers when the Baudelaires escape into the van of the Volunteers Fighting Disease.

=== Lou ===
- The Hostile Hospital

Lou is a newspaper delivery boy.

He first appears in The Hostile Hospital where he brings the newspapers from the Daily Punctilio to the Last Chance General Store. When the front page lists that the Baudelaires have murdered "Count Olaf", he and Milt try to catch the Baudelaires only for them to escape into the van of the Volunteers Fighting Disease.

In the TV series, Lou is portrayed by Gabe Khouth. Instead of Lou and Milt recognizing the Baudelaires from the newspaper, the Baudelaires leave when Count Olaf shows up. Though Lou still unloaded the newspapers when the Baudelaires escape into the van of the Volunteers Fighting Disease.

=== Babs ===
- The Hostile Hospital

Babs first appears in The Hostile Hospital.

She is the head of Heimlich Hospital's Human Resources Department. She is never seen but is heard over an intercom, which distorts her voice and makes it sound "scratchy". She seems to believe that the Baudelaires should be "seen and not heard" which is ironic since she cannot see them anyway. Count Olaf, disguised as Mattathias, later stole her position to take control of the hospital and hinted that he pushed her off the roof of the hospital as he said she had "decided to pursue a career as a stuntwoman" and had "started jumping off buildings immediately." This means that Olaf probably pushed her off a roof or forced her to jump off one. Either way, Babs was implied to have been killed.

In the TV series, Babs is portrayed by Kerri Kenney-Silver. She is actually seen in this version and is easily stressed, carrying a paper bag around to breathe into when she begins to hyperventilate. Babs is also obsessed with paperwork. Despite them not being on her list, she allows Count Olaf, disguised as Dr. Mattathias Medicalschool, and his troupe into the hospital. Later, they capture her and Count Olaf replaces her as the head of the Human Resources Department. When Violet is also captured, she attempts to escape with Babs, but Babs's nervous laughter and loud speech results in them being captured by Count Olaf again and separated. Despite Count Olaf threatening to kill her at this point, Babs survives and is later seen escaping Heimlich Hospital during the fire and mourning the loss of her clipboard and paperwork. Mr. Poe attempts to comfort her as he chases after the Baudelaires.

=== The Man with Pimples on His Chin ===
- The Carnivorous Carnival

The Man with Pimples on His Chin is a middle-aged man and a resident of the Hinterlands with several large pimples on his chin and a skin condition that cause people to mistake him for a freak. He appears in The Carnivorous Carnival to see the House of Freaks and the lion pit.

=== Fiona ===
- The Grim Grotto

Fiona is a bright mycologist and is the stepdaughter of Captain Widdershins and the sister of Fernald (the Hook-Handed Man). She is also the love interest of Klaus Baudelaire.

Fiona first appears in The Grim Grotto, when Violet, Klaus and Sunny Baudelaire enter the Queequeg. Though she is not part of the Queequeg's "Crew of Two", she is the ship's head engineer. Fiona is the first non-Baudelaire that can actually understand some of Sunny's utterances. Later, Fiona goes with the Baudelaires into the Gorgonian Grotto to look for the sugar bowl, but when the four children come back, empty-handed, they find the Queequeg deserted; Captain Widdershins and Phil had been convinced by an unnamed woman to abandon the ship. Count Olaf then captures the submarine with his own, the Carmelita, and takes the Baudelaires and Fiona to the brig to be tortured by the Hook-Handed Man, who turns out to be Fiona's long-lost brother Fernald. The Baudelaires and Fiona persuade Fernald to join them and help them escape. The Baudelaires escape, but Fiona and Fernald are caught and tell Esmé Squalor that they support Count Olaf. At this point, Esmé begins to call Fiona "Triangle-Eyes", due to the triangular shape of her glasses. Later, Fernald persuades Fiona to really be part of Count Olaf's troupe. Fiona, knowing that she is wrong, allows the Baudelaires free access to the Queequeg to escape. But she cannot go with them, out of loyalty to her brother, but before she rejoins Olaf, however, she kisses Klaus.

Fiona did not appear in The Penultimate Peril, but Count Olaf says that she and Fernald stole the Carmelita. In The End, it was revealed that both returned to the Fire-Fighting Side of V.F.D., but they may have been sucked into The Great Unknown.

In the TV series, Fiona (who is given the surname Widdershins) is portrayed by Kassius Nelson. She is the captain of the Queequeg and completely replaces her stepfather whom she is looking for. Unlike the books where Lemony claims that Fiona "broke Klaus's heart", Fiona's decision to leave with her brother is made understandable to him and they seem to part on better terms. In "The End", Lemony postulates that she and Fernald managed to find their stepfather.

=== Kit Snicket ===
- The Grim Grotto
- The Penultimate Peril
- The End

Kit Snicket is the sister of Lemony and Jacques Snicket, the lover of Dewey Denouement, and the mother of Beatrice II. She was four years old when the Schism began and became a member of the fire-fighting side of the V.F.D.

In All the Wrong Questions, she was as young as Lemony Snicket was, and she was repeatedly arrested during some of her missions, oftentimes alongside Ellington Feint, particularly in Shouldn't You Be in School? and Why is This Night Different From All Other Nights?.

In Lemony Snicket: The Unauthorized Autobiography, Kit Snicket went to Prufrock Preparatory to work as a teacher under the alias of Mrs. K following Mr. Remora's retirement. When Carmelita Spats' parents informed Vice-Principal Nero that Mrs. K was having the students read books that are not on the recommended list, Vice-Principal Nero fired her as Kit made off with two orphans that were attending Prufrock Preparatory.

In The Grim Grotto, Kit Snicket was mentioned to have helped Captain Widdershins in constructing the Queequg. She also warned Gregor Anwhistle about the use of the Medusoid Mycelium. By the end of the book, she meets the Baudelaires at Briny Beach and takes them away in her taxicab.

In The Penultimate Peril, Kit Snicket brings the Baudelaires to Hotel Denouement where she provides them with concierge disguises, mentions that she is pregnant and informs them about Frank and Ernest Denouement. Lemony Snicket mentioned that Kit rode a jet ski in order to meet up with Captain Widdershins.

In The End, Kit Snicket and the Incredible Deadly Viper wash up on the coastal shelf of the island on a raft of books where her legs are injured. After regaining consciousness, she tells the Baudelaires about how Hector's mobile home crashed into the Queequeg and she got injured when the telegram device fell on her legs. Kit also mentions that she does not know what happened to Hector, the Quagmires, Captain Widdershins, Fernald, and Fiona when the Great Unknown neared the wreckage. Later on, Kit is among those who are poisoned by the Medusoid Mycelium and refuses the hybrid horseradish apple that counters it due to the side effects it has on unborn children. As Kit goes into labour, Count Olaf performs his only act of kindness by carrying her to a place to give birth as he helps to deliver her child. After Kit dies giving birth, Count Olaf dies from his injuries. Both of them are buried next to each other as the Baudelaires take Beatrice Baudelaire II into their custody.

In the TV series, Kit Snicket is portrayed by Allison Williams. It reveals that she was both formerly engaged to Olaf and present the day when Beatrice Baudelaire threw a poisonous dart at Esmé Squalor only to hit the fire chief that was Count Olaf's father.

=== Castaways ===
The Castaways are a group of people that live on an island that Count Olaf tried to christen as Olaf Land. Among the known castaways are:

==== Ishmael ====
- The End

Ishmael appears in The End, in which he is the main antagonist.

Ishmael is the facilitator of a small colony of island inhabitants and former member of V.F.D. He blames Count Olaf for the fire that destroyed his home to which Count Olaf claimed was not caused by him. Ishmael uses peer pressure and the sedative of fermented coconut cordial to influence the islanders. While claiming to be unable to walk, he often sneaks off to the island's arboretum writing diary entries and organizing shipwrecked objects. The Baudelaires, when on this island, discover that he used to know their parents and forced them off the island when their mother was pregnant with Violet. When they ask him why he keeps so many secrets from the islanders, he says that he is trying to keep them safe. Ishmael was the one who used a harpoon gun on Count Olaf at the cost of infecting the castaways, Count Olaf, and Kit Snicket with the Medusoid Mycelium. He is last seen on a boat leaving the island, surrounded by poisoned islanders, although he previously consumed an antidote.

In the TV series, Ishmael is portrayed by Peter MacNicol. Unlike the novel, he can freely walk about, but prefers to sit most of the time. His home was not burned down by Olaf but instead, Ishmael is revealed to be the founder of V.F.D. and the estranged principal of Prufrock Preparatory School where he would induct young members into the group. He also did not force the Baudelaire parents off the island and instead they left on their own accord. When the Medusoid Mycelium was unleashed, Ishmael led the castaways off the island as he knows of an antidote factory on the part of the mainland that's close to their island. Lemony deduces that Ishmael and the islanders were saved by the Incredibly Deadly Viper who swam miles into the ocean to deliver the special apple to them all, despite that he's not sure.

==== Friday Caliban ====
- The End

Friday Caliban is a young island girl who quickly befriends the Baudelaires, giving Sunny a whisk as a gift, and making enemies with Count Olaf by abandoning him. She is the daughter of Thursday and Miranda Caliban. Her mother told her that her father was eaten by a manatee in the storm which shipwrecked her on the island, but the truth is that Miranda and Thursday were separated by the schism and Miranda did not want her daughter to know this. Friday was forced to leave the island on a boat with the other islanders, all of them infected by the Medusoid Mycelium, leaving the Baudelaires behind. Her name is a reference to Robinson Crusoe and to The Tempest.

In the TV series, Friday is portrayed by Nakai Takawira. Unlike the novel, Friday's role is reduced somewhat and her background in never delved into. Her last name is never even mentioned. Lemony deduces that the islanders were saved by the Incredibly Deadly Viper who swam miles into the ocean to deliver the special apple to them all, though is unsure.

==== Minor castaways ====
The following castaways do not play a big part in the series and most of them are not identified in the TV series:

- Alonso – Not much is known about Alonso except for the fact that prior to living on the island, he was involved in a dreadful political scandal. He is named after a character in Shakespeare's The Tempest. In the TV series, Alonso is portrayed by Simon Chin.
- Ariel – Prior to arriving on the island, Ariel spent time in prison where she was disguised as a man for years before escaping. Ariel is described to be a year or two older than Violet. She is named after a character in Shakespeare's The Tempest.
- Brewster – A castaway who reaps the wild grass that serves as a spice on the Island. He is named after Maud Brewster, a character in Jack London's The Sea-Wolf.
- Byam – A former sailor who washed up on the Island. Byam's job on the Island is fermenting the coconuts. He is named after Roger Byam, a fictional character in the novel Mutiny on the Bounty.
- Calypso – A castaway who assists Brewster into reaping the wild grass that serves as a spice on the Island. She is named after the sea nymph Calypso from Greek mythology.
- Dr. Kurtz – A castaway who apparently was a veteran. He is named after a character in Joseph Conrad's Heart of Darkness.
- Erewhon – A former inhabitant of an island far away from the castaway's island. Erewhon once taught Miranda Caliban the backstroke. She was the one responsible for orchestrating the mutiny on Ishmael. She is named after the utopia in Samuel Butler's book of the same name. It is also an anagram of Nowhere.
- Ferdinand – The Island's residential fisherman. He is named after a character in Shakespeare's The Tempest.
- Finn – A young girl who assisted Omeros in picking the wild onions. She is named after Mark Twain's Huckleberry Finn.
- Jonah and Sadie Bellamy – Two siblings who brought the boat containing the Baudelaires in while storm scavenging. They are named after the biblical Jonah; a character in The Adventures of Sadie, aka Our Girl Friday, a 1953 film about a shipwrecked girl; and Samuel Bellamy, an 18th-century pirate who was shipwrecked off Cape Cod. The surname may also refer to Edward Bellamy, author of the utopian novel Looking Backward.
- Larsen – The Island's residential fisherman who works with Ferdinand. He is named after Wolf Larsen, a character in Jack London's The Sea-Wolf.
- Madame Nordoff – A resident of the Island who once taught Finn how to yodel. She is named after Charles Nordhoff, co-author of Mutiny on the Bounty.
- Miranda Caliban – The mother of Friday and the wife of Thursday. Miranda covered up the fact to her daughter that her father left the island by stating that he was killed in a manatee accident. Though Miranda stated that it was better that she and Friday remained on the island. She is named after a character in Shakespeare's The Tempest. In the TV series, Miranda is portrayed by Angela Moore. She says that she was pregnant with Friday when she arrived on the island.
- Mr. Pitcairn – An Islander who is tasked to gather coconuts. He is named after the Pitcairn Islands where the Bounty mutineers eventually settled.
- Ms. Marlow – An Islander who assists Mr. Pitcairn into gathering coconuts. She is named after a character in Joseph Conrad's Heart of Darkness.
- Omeros – An Islander who is about the same height as Klaus who picks the wild onions on the island. He is possibly named after the Greek epic poet Homer, whose Iliad and Odyssey deal extensively with sea voyages and shipwrecks; another possibility is the 1990 poem of the same name by Derek Walcott, which is partly a retelling of the Odyssey set in the Caribbean.
- Professor Fletcher – An Islander who secretly taught reading classes to those born on the Island. He is named after Bounty mutineer Fletcher Christian.
- Rabbi Bligh – The castaways' residential rabbi. He is named after Bounty captain William Bligh.
- Robinson – An Islander whose job is the rinse out the seaweed and handle the laundry. He is named after the title character in Daniel Defoe's Robinson Crusoe.
- Sherman – An Islander who assists Robinson into rinsing out the seaweed. He is named after General William Tecumseh Sherman, who survived two shipwrecks; or from William Pène du Bois's The Twenty-One Balloons.
- Thursday Caliban – The father of Friday Caliban and the husband of Miranda Caliban. He was an islander for a short time before the events of book. Miranda covered up the fact to her daughter that her father left the island by stating that he was killed in a manatee accident.
- Weyden – A red-haired woman who first arrived at the island on a raft of books. She is named after Humphrey Van Weyden, a character in Jack London's The Sea-Wolf.
- Willa – An Islander with an "unusually large head" who assists Byam in fermenting the coconuts. She is possibly named after writer Willa Cather who refers to a shipwreck in a notable quotation.

== Appearing in other adaptations ==
The following characters appear in the different media adaptations of A Series of Unfortunate Events:

=== Constable ===
The unnamed Constable is a police officer who is exclusive to the film and is portrayed by Cedric the Entertainer.

He is first seen with Mr. Poe when Montgomery Montgomery was found dead and the Incredibly Deadly Viper is the suspect while stating that he had to be called into work early in the morning. When the Baudelaires prove the innocence of the Incredibly Deadly Viper, the Constable is among those who have noticed that Count Olaf in the alias of Stephano has escaped. Later on, the Constable was with Mr. Poe when they find that Count Olaf had rescued the Baudelaires from the Lachrymose Leeches. When he attends the production of The Marvelous Marriage, the Constable sits besides a critic. When Count Olaf's plot has been exposed, the Constable handcuffed Count Olaf as the crowd converged on him.

=== Judge Fred Gallo ===
Judge Fred Gallo is a judge who is exclusive to the film and is named after his actor Fred Gallo.

He had two scenes in the film. In his first scene, Gallo granted custody of the Baudelaire children to Count Olaf. In his second scene, Gallo found Count Olaf guilty following his arrest. Lemony Snicket states that the judge's decree is that Count Olaf was to suffer every hardship he put the Baudelaires through. Then Lemony states that Count Olaf vanished after a jury of his peers overturned his sentence.

=== Jacquelyn Scieszka ===
Jacquelyn Scieszka is Arthur Poe's secretary who is exclusive to the Netflix series and is portrayed by Sara Canning.

She is a member of V.F.D. and worked with Gustav Sebald in his film Zombies in the Snow.

In "The Bad Beginning" Pt. 2, Jacquelyn got suspicious when Count Olaf under the alias of Yessica Haircut showed up. When she looked at his car through her spyglass, the Bald Man stated that he'd like to make a withdrawal, then tied her to a tree in a remote park. In the sewers, she met up with Gustav as they attended the play The Marvelous Marriage. When Count Olaf's plot has been exposed, Jacquelyn and Gustav confirmed Count Olaf's illegal actions and stated that the Baudelaires were supposed to be brought to Montgomery Montgomery.

In "The Reptile Room" Pt. 2, she appeared in the disguise of a statue in the hedge maze outside of Montgomery Montgomery's house and told the Baudelaires to seek out Josephine Anwhistle. Later on, she confronted Count Olaf on the Prospero and briefly fought Count Olaf before he got away.

In "The Austere Academy" Pt. 1, Jacquelyn overhears Mr. Poe's talk with Mr. Tammerlane and sends Larry the Waiter to Prufrock Preparatory. After getting a call from Larry that Count Olaf trapped him in the walk-in freezer, Jacquelyn contacts Jacques Snicket to rescue him.

In "The Ersatz Elevator", Jacquelyn overhears Olivia Caliban's talk with Mr. Poe about Count Olaf's scheme. She contacts Jacques again to bring Olivia into the V.F.D. When it came to the auction overseen by Count Olaf in the alias of Gunther, Jacquelyn slipped by the Bald Man while using the Yessica Haircut alias in order to partake in a bidding war over a suspected item that Duncan and Isadora Quagmire are in.

In "The Vile Village" Pt. 2, Jacquelyn and Larry arrive at the Village of Fowl Devotees in a futile attempt to calm down the villagers who want to burn the Baudelaires at the stake. While they are tied up by Count Olaf's associates, Jacquelyn and Larry see evidence that the Baudelaires and the Quagmires have each gotten away.

In "The Carnivorous Carnival" Pt. 1, Jacquelyn is seen in a flashback attending the party at V.F.D. Headquarters where she interacts with Georgina Orwell. The Baudelaires later find a film reel at the Caligari Carnival detailing the V.F.D. where Jacquelyn talks about the loss of the V.F.D.'s best lion tamer and her husband resulting in the Volunteer Feline Detectives fleeing into the Hinterlands.

In "The Slippery Slope" Pt. 2, it was mentioned by Mr. Poe in a discussion with Kit Snicket that Jacquelyn left to become the new Duchess of Winnipeg.

=== Mr. Tammerlane ===
Mr. Tammerlane is the head of Mulctuary Money Management who is exclusive to the Netflix series and is voiced by Barry Sonnenfeld.

He was first heard on the phone in "The Miserable Mill" Pt. 2 where he orders Arthur Poe to find the Baudelaires who have gone missing after what happened at Lake Lachrymose.

In "The Austere Academy" Pt. 1, Mr. Poe contacts Mr. Tammerlane telling him that he has enrolled them at Prufrock Preparatory while reviewing "The Pony Party" book.

In "The Slippery Slope" Pt. 2, Mr. Poe takes a break from the city following Mrs. Bass' arrest and also to give Mr. Tammerlane time to cool down after what transpired at Mulctuary Money Management. By the end of the episode, Mr. Tammerlane calls up Mr. Poe informing him of fires happening in the city and children losing their parents in the fires at the same time.

=== Official Fire Chief ===
The unnamed Fire Chief was the head of the city's Fire Department and Count Olaf's father whose appearance is exclusive to the Netflix series and is portrayed by Eric Keenleyside. He was mentioned as deceased in the books, and existed in the timeline of the film, but was never seen in both of this media.

He was accidentally killed by poisoned dart thrown by Beatrice at the opera (which was meant to hit Esmé), which lead to Olaf's vengeance on Beatrice, Lemony (who was with her) and the entire V.F.D. organization.
