= The Carnivorous Carnival =

2002 children's novel

- Author: Lemony Snicket (pen name of Daniel Handler)
- Illustrator: Brett Helquist
- Cover artist: Brett Helquist
- Language: English
- Series: A Series of Unfortunate Events
- Genre: Gothic fiction Absurdist fiction Mystery
- Publisher: HarperCollins
- Publication date: October 28, 2002
- Publication place: United States
- Media type: Print (hardback & paperback)
- Pages: 286
- ISBN: 0-06-441012-9 (first edition, hardback)
- OCLC: 49952611
- Dewey Decimal: Fic 21
- LC Class: PZ7.S6795 Car 2002
- Preceded by: The Hostile Hospital
- Followed by: The Slippery Slope

Book the Ninth: The Carnivorous Carnival is the ninth novel in the children's novel series A Series of Unfortunate Events by Lemony Snicket.

== Plot summary ==
Following the events of The Hostile Hospital, Violet, Klaus and Sunny Baudelaire arrive at Caligari Carnival in the trunk of Count Olaf and his theatre troupe's car, unknown to them. Olaf and his associates speak of seeking Madame Lulu, a mysterious fortune-teller and owner of Caligari Carnival, for answers of the whereabouts of the Snicket files, which apparently contains crucial information on V.F.D. As the troupe discuss with Lulu, the Baudelaires escape the trunk and disguise themselves as freak volunteers for the Carnival's freak show, Violet and Klaus as a two-headed humanoid 'Beverly' and 'Elliot', and Sunny as 'Chabo the Wolf Baby', a supposed half-wolf.

After being accepted by Lulu, they meet three other freaks in the 'Freak Caravan': Hugo, a hunchback; Kevin, who is ambidextrous; and Colette, a contortionist. The Baudelaires are oblivious to the reason of their self-consciousness on their rare abilities. Every day they are forced to perform and be ridiculed in front of a small audience.

The next day, Count Olaf announces that a freak will be chosen to be fed to a pack of abused lions, in order to increase the popularity of the carnival. Olaf tells Esmé Squalor that Madame Lulu has predicted the whereabouts of the remaining Baudelaire parent to be in a V.F.D headquarters located in the Mortmain Mountains. Violet, Klaus and Sunny explore Madame Lulu's tent, where she supposedly predicts answers using a glass ball—however, they discover that she tricked Olaf into thinking so by using a machine to create the effects, and either guesses the answer or finds the answers in her secret archival library. Madame Lulu enters, and after hollering at the Baudelaires for trespassing, is shamed into revealing her true identity as Olivia. Olivia explains that she goes by the motto 'Give People What They Want', thus her feeding Olaf information. She reveals to be part of V.F.D, and admits to only be guessing one of their parents to be in Mortmain Mountains after the Baudelaires reveal themselves to her.

After striking a deal with her to bring her with them when they explore Mortmain Mountains, on the condition that she doesn't tell Olaf their true identities, the three return to the Freak Caravan, where Esme Squalor, who is jealous of Madame Lulu, convinces Hugo, Kevin and Colette to feed Madame Lulu to the lions the following day—in exchange, they will be employed as Olaf's associates. Shortly after Violet works on fixing the carnival's roller coaster to use to travel to the Mortmain Mountains, the Baudelaires are forced to participate in the lion show. Count Olaf announces Violet and Klaus (as Beverly and Elliot) to be fed to the lions. They stall the feeding and cause a commotion among the audience allowing them to escape—however, Olaf's bald associate and Lulu fall into the lion pit to their deaths.

After it becomes apparent they can't continue the roller coaster plan, Olaf, (after burning down the majority of the carnival) invites them to join on a quest to the Mortmain Mountains. Believing this to be the only way to arrive there, they agree and ride on a caravan attached to the troupe's car. However, Olaf reveals that Lulu told him that they were the Baudelaires in disguise, and takes Sunny while the newly recruited freaks cut the rope connecting the car and caravan on a steep cliff, leaving the book on a literal cliffhanger.

== Foreshadowing ==
In the last picture of The Carnivorous Carnival, the Freaks' Caravan is shown rolling off the edge of a cliff. Falling through the air is a copy of the Snow Scout Handbook. This is a reference to the Snow Scouts in The Slippery Slope.

== Translations ==
- Brazilian Portuguese: "O Espetáculo Carnívoro" (The Carnivorous Show), Cia. das Letras, 2004, ISBN 85-359-0524-3
- Finnish: "Tihutöiden tivoli" (The Carnival of Mischiefs), WSOY, 2005, ISBN 951-0-30214-7
- Italian: "Il carosello carnivoro", Salani, 2005, ISBN 978-88-8451-516-2
- Greek: "Το Σαρκοβόρο Τσίρκο"
- Japanese: "肉食カーニバル", Soshisha, 2005, ISBN 4-7942-1413-8
- Korean: "살벌한 유원지" (Bloody Amusement Park), Munhakdongnae Publishing Co, Ltd., 2009, ISBN 978-89-546-0968-5
- Norwegian: Tragedie på tivoli (Tragedy at the Carnival), Tor Edvin Dahl, Cappelen Damm, 2004, ISBN 9788202228378
- Russian: "Кровожадный Карнавал" (The Bloodthirsty Carnival), Azbuka, 2004, ISBN 978-5-352-02212-2
- French: La Fête Féroce (The Ferocious Festival)
- Turkish: "Karnaval Ucubeleri" (Carnival Freaks)
- Polish: "Krwiożerczy karnawał" (The Bloodthirsty Carnival)
- Thai: "เทศกาลระทึกขวัญ", Nanmeebooks Teen, 2004, ISBN 9749656423
- Swedish: "Det Tvetydliga Tivolit" (The Ambiguous Amusement Park), Damm Förlag AB, ISBN 91-7715-971-3

== Adaptation ==
The book was adapted into the ninth and tenth episodes of the second season of the television series adaptation produced by Netflix. In this version, Count Olaf’s bald associate (played by John DeSantis) survives and many characters from previous episodes can be seen in the audience during the show where only Olivia (played by Sara Rue) is eaten.

== See also ==
- Violet Baudelaire
- Klaus Baudelaire
- Sunny Baudelaire
- Count Olaf
- Lemony Snicket
- Esmé Squalor
