= The Vile Village =

2001 children's novel

- Author: Lemony Snicket
- Illustrator: Brett Helquist
- Cover artist: Brett Helquist
- Language: English
- Series: A Series of Unfortunate Events
- Genre: Gothic fiction Absurdist fiction Mystery
- Publisher: HarperCollins
- Publication date: May 2001
- Publication place: United States
- Media type: Print (hardback & paperback)
- Pages: 256
- ISBN: 978-0-06-440865-3
- Preceded by: The Ersatz Elevator
- Followed by: The Hostile Hospital

Book the Seventh: The Vile Village is the seventh novel in the children's book series A Series of Unfortunate Events by Lemony Snicket.

In The Vile Village, the Baudelaire orphans are taken into the care of a whole village, only to find many rules and chores, evil seniors, as well as Count Olaf and his evil girlfriend lurking nearby.

This book marks a turning point in the structure of the series and effectively marks the halfway mark between books one to six and eight to thirteen. It breaks with the following major patterns of the earlier books in the series:

- The Baudelaires can no longer call on Mr. Poe for assistance, although he was barely any help to begin with.
- The Baudelaires themselves are deemed "criminals", and they are not assigned any more legal guardians after this point.
- Because the authorities turn their attention away from him, Count Olaf is no longer obliged to use disguises.

== Plot ==
Mr. Poe receives a brochure about a program where villages have signed up to communally raise children—the Baudelaires choose the village V.F.D., an abbreviation which the Quagmire children communicated to them while being kidnapped at the end of The Austere Academy. The village has a large number of unusual rules, created by the Council of Elders: their newest rule, outlawing villains, is meant to keep out Count Olaf. The children will live with the village's handyman, Hector. He tells them that the initials stand for the Village of Fowl Devotees—in reference to the large number of crows which follow very specific roosting patterns. At sunset they fly to the Nevermore Tree, outside Hector's house.

Hector shows the children a couplet he found underneath the Nevermore Tree, which resembles Isadora Quagmire's style of poetry. The children stay awake to see if any more messages arrive, and discover a second couplet the next morning. Along with Hector, they do chores for individual villagers. After cleaning the crow-shaped Fowl Fountain, a council member tells them that Count Olaf has been captured by the new Chief of Police, Officer Luciana. Though the imprisoned man has a unibrow and a tattoo of an eye on his left ankle, he is not Count Olaf. He says that his name is Jacques. Nonetheless, the villagers plan to burn him at the stake—the punishment for breaking one of the town's rules.

Violet helps Hector with last-minute fixes to an invention he has been working on, against the rules of the village: a self-sustaining hot air mobile home so that he can fly away from the town and live up in the air. The next morning, after the children find another couplet, Count Olaf has arrived, disguised as Detective Dupin, and Jacques is dead. Olaf frames the children, who are jailed and will be burned at the stake the next day. He plans to smuggle one of them away to steal their fortune.

The children are given bread and a pitcher of water, as Klaus realizes that it is his thirteenth birthday. At Violet's instruction, the children spend the night repeatedly pouring the water down a wooden bench onto the jail cell wall, before reabsorbing it with the spongy bread. This slowly dissolves the mortar between the bricks in the wall, until a hole can be made by using the bench as a battering ram. They escape, after Hector passes them a fourth couplet through their cell window. Meanwhile, Klaus discovers that the first letter of each line in the couplets, read in order, spells "fountain".

The children work out that the Quagmires must be hidden in the beak of Fowl Fountain. Sunny stands on Klaus's shoulders as he stands on Violet's shoulders. Violet and Klaus fall and as Sunny is slipping off the fountain, she sinks her teeth into a crow eye that opens the fountain's beak. With the Quagmire children, the Baudelaires flee the villagers, who have formed an angry mob. As they run, the Quagmires explain that from inside the fountain, they could attach a message to a crow by morning who would take it to the Nevermore Tree, where it would fall off.

When Hector is directly overhead, on the functioning self-sustained hot air mobile home, he sends down the ladder. As the home continually rises, the Quagmire children climb, followed by the Baudelaires. With a harpoon gun, Luciana aims for the balloons to make the home fall to the ground. Once the Quagmires are in the home, she hits the ladder instead, and the Baudelaires have to climb down to the ground to avoid falling to their deaths. The Quagmires throw down their commonplace notebooks, but Luciana succeeds in skewering both of them with a harpoon.

However, Luciana also injures a crow with the harpoon, causing the villagers to turn on her as it is against their most important rule of all. She reveals herself as Esmé Squalor, now Olaf's girlfriend, and escapes with him by motorcycle. The villagers leave to take care of the crow and the Baudelaires collect the damaged fragments of the Quagmire's notebooks. Sunny takes her first steps unaided as the children leave the village on foot.

== Foreshadowing ==
The last picture of The Vile Village shows Klaus in the foreground, trying to pick up the scraps of the Quagmires' commonplace books, and Violet and Sunny in the background, being blown about by the wind, about to walk into the horizon of emptiness. A copy of The Daily Punctilio appears in the scene, with an ad for the Last Chance General Store, a reference to The Hostile Hospital.

== Cultural references and literary allusions ==
- The Nevermore Tree is a reference to Edgar Allan Poe's The Raven, in which a raven repeats the word "Nevermore".
- At the start of the novel Mr. Poe receives a phone call from a Mr. Fagin, a distant relative who informs Poe that he cannot take the orphans. In Oliver Twist, Fagin is a nefarious character who uses orphaned children in his criminal exploits.
- Olaf's alias, Detective Dupin, is a reference most likely to C. Auguste Dupin, a fictional detective character created by Edgar Allan Poe, but possibly to Arsène Lupin, a fictional gentleman thief and master of disguise created by French writer Maurice Leblanc.
- Mr. Lesko, a town resident, has the same last name as the author Matthew Lesko, who offered to teach how to get free things. Mr. Lesko says in this book that he is fine with getting his chores done for him but not having to parent the Baudelaires (he wants free laborers).
- Mrs. Morrow, another town resident, has the same name as a minor character in The Catcher in the Rye.
- "It takes a village to raise a child" is a well-known proverb.

== Translations ==
- Brazilian Portuguese: "A Cidade Sinistra dos Corvos" (The Sinister City of Crows), Cia. das Letras, 2003, ISBN 85-359-0392-5
- Finnish: "Kelvoton kylä" (A Useless Village), WSOY, 2004, ISBN 951-0-29450-0
- French: "L’arbre aux corbeaux" (The Tree of Crows)
- Greek: "Το Αχρείο Χωριό" (The Village of Scoundrels)
- Japanese: "鼻持ちならない村" (The Odious Village), Soshisha, 2004, ISBN 4-7942-1309-3
- Korean: "사악한 마을" (Evil Town), Munhakdongnae Publishing Co, Ltd., 2008, ISBN 978-89-546-0615-8
- Norwegian: Den beksvarte byen (The Pitch Black Town), Tor Edvin Dahl, Cappelen Damm, 2003, ISBN 9788202225117
- Russian: "Гадкий городишко" (A Vile Town), Azbuka, 2005, ISBN 5-352-01025-2
- Turkish :"Karga Laneti" (Crow Curse)
- Italian: "Il Vile Villaggio"
- Polish : "Wredna wioska" (The Mean/Despicable Village)
- Estonian: “Kurjuse küla” (The Village of Evil)
- Thai: "หมู่บ้านสามานย์", Nanmeebooks Teen, 2003, ISBN 9744719532
- Swedish: "Den bedrövliga byn" (The Deplorable Village), Richters, 2004, ISBN 91-7715-559-9

== Adaptation ==
The book was adapted into the fifth and sixth episodes of the second season of the television series adaptation produced by Netflix.

== See also ==
- Violet Baudelaire
- Klaus Baudelaire
- Sunny Baudelaire
- Count Olaf
- Lemony Snicket
- Arthur Poe
- Esmé Squalor
