= The Hostile Hospital =

2001 children's novel

- Author: Lemony Snicket (pen name of Daniel Handler)
- Illustrator: Brett Helquist
- Cover artist: Brett Helquist
- Language: English
- Series: A Series of Unfortunate Events
- Genre: Gothic fiction Absurdist fiction Mystery
- Publisher: HarperCollins
- Publication date: September 2001
- Publication place: United States
- Media type: Print (hardback & paperback)
- Pages: 255
- ISBN: 0-06-175720-9
- Preceded by: The Vile Village
- Followed by: The Carnivorous Carnival

Book the Eighth: The Hostile Hospital is the eighth novel in the children's book series A Series of Unfortunate Events by Lemony Snicket, the pseudonym of Daniel Handler. It takes place shortly after The Vile Village and is followed by a sequel, The Carnivorous Carnival.

== Plot ==
After escaping the Village of Fowl Devotees, Violet, Klaus and Sunny Baudelaire arrive at a store to send a telegram to Mr. Poe, explaining their situation and pleading for help. The store's generous owner explains that a van of 'Volunteers Fighting Disease' arrives once every day for a gas refill. The van arrives, and the Baudelaires, thinking it to be the acronym 'V.F.D.', escape into it after the owner recognizes them as the accused murderers in the Daily Punctilio, an unreliable newspaper series.

The Baudelaires discover that Volunteers Fighting Disease is a group of enthusiasts that visit Heimlich Hospital, a hospital that’s only half finished, to increase the morale of patients. They believe that 'No News Is Good News', so they have never read The Daily Punctilio and don't recognize the Baudelaires. One of the members suggests the Baudelaires seek a Library of Records to find their V.F.D. The three then volunteer to aid Hal, a visually disabled elder who works in Heimlich Hospital's Library of Records. As he doesn't let them read any of the files, the Baudelaires regretfully trick him into giving them his keys to enter the library at night. While reading a file on the Baudelaires, in which only the thirteenth page remained since investigators have taken the rest, they discover that one of their parents may have survived or escaped the mansion's fire! However, Esmé Squalor enters the library, intent on destroying them and the files to clear Count Olaf's name in the crimes he has committed.

While escaping her clutches, Klaus and Sunny go through a small shaft, but Violet is taken when Count Olaf captures her and hides her from her siblings. The two, using the volunteers' list of patients, find out that Count Olaf has disguised Violet's name with another name with the use of anagrams, and track her down to the surgery room. Dr. Mattathias (who is Count Olaf), the Head of Human Resources, announces via intercom that a craniectomy will be performed on Violet in an operating theatre. Klaus and Sunny disguise themselves as Dr. Tocuna and Nurse Flo to perform the surgery with the Hook-handed man and the Bald Man, recurring associates of Count Olaf reusing their aliases, Lucafont and Flacutono.

While the two stall during the performance for Violet to wake up, Hal angrily accuses the Baudelaires of committing arson, and the hospital begins to burn to the ground. Violet eventually awakens, and they try to escape by hiding in a storage room while Olaf's henchperson of indeterminate gender tries to break in. They safely jump out of the window via Violet's makeshift bungee rope while Olaf's henchperson gets stuck and dies in the fire. They then hide in the trunk of Count Olaf's car after overhearing him discuss hunting down the Snicket file, which apparently contains crucial information on V.F.D., Jacques Snicket, and the Baudelaires.

== Foreshadowing ==
The last picture of The Hostile Hospital shows Violet, Klaus, and Sunny are crammed into the trunk of Count Olaf's car. Among other items in the trunk are a crystal ball, a flier with "Madame Lulu" printed across the top, and a scrap of paper on which is drawn an eye. This is a reference to Madame Lulu in The Carnivorous Carnival.

== Translations ==
- Brazilian Portuguese: "O Hospital Hostil", Cia. das Letras, 2003, ISBN 85-359-0451-4
- Finnish: "Painajaisten parantola" (The Sanatorium of Nightmares) , WSOY, 2004, ISBN 951-0-29451-9
- Italian: "L'ostile ospedale", Salani, 2004, ISBN 978-88-8451-325-0
- French: "Panique à la clinique" (Panic at the Clinic)
- Greek: "Το Νοσηρό Νοσοκομείο" ("The Sick Hospital")
- Japanese: "敵意ある病院", Soshisha, 2004, ISBN 978-47-942-1363-1
- Korean: "죽음의 병원" (The Hospital of Death), Munhakdongnae Publishing Co, Ltd., 2009, ISBN 978-89-546-0871-8
- Norwegian: Det horrible hospitalet (The Horrible Hospital), Tor Edvin Dahl, Cappelen Damm, 2003, ISBN 9788202225124
- Russian: Кошмарная клиника (Nightmarish Clinic), Azbuka, 2005, ISBN 5-352-01227-1
- Turkish : "Dehşet Hastanesi" (Horror Hospital)
- Polish : "Szkodliwy szpital" (The Harmful Hospital)
- Thai: "โรงพยาบาลวิปริต", Nanmeebooks Teen, 2003, ISBN 9749656172

== Adaptation ==
The book was adapted into the seventh and eighth episodes of the second season of the television series adaptation produced by Netflix. In this version, the completed side of the hospital is old and dirty and the henchperson of indeterminate gender (played by Matty Cardarople) survives the fire.

== See also ==
- Violet Baudelaire
- Klaus Baudelaire
- Sunny Baudelaire
- Count Olaf
- Lemony Snicket
- Esmé Squalor
- Hal (A Series of Unfortunate Events)
- V.F.D.
