= Lemony Snicket: The Unauthorized Autobiography =

Book by Lemony Snicket

- First edition cover
- Author: Lemony Snicket
- Illustrator: Brett Helquist
- Language: English
- Genre: Fictional biographical novel
- Publisher: HarperCollins, Egmont Publishing (UK)
- Publication date: May 2002 (US); August 2002, 3 September 2007 (U.K.)
- Publication place: United States
- Media type: Print (hardback & paperback)
- Pages: 218 pp
- ISBN: 978-0-06-000719-5 (first edition, hardback)
- OCLC: 48435430
- Dewey Decimal: [Fic] 21
- LC Class: PZ7.S6795 Un 2002

Lemony Snicket: The Unauthorized Autobiography is a fictional "autobiography" of A Series of Unfortunate Events author and character Lemony Snicket. It was published on May 1, 2002.

== Synopsis and style ==
Although it is labeled "Unauthorized" for humor, the book is in fact official. Beginning with a multi-layered introduction by Daniel Handler that encompasses twelve of the book's thirteen chapters, the book is largely made up of facsimile documents, such as old newspaper excerpts and letters, as well as excerpts from other books. The book also uses a mixture of black-and-white photography by Meredith Heuer and Julie Blattberg and 1930s photography gathered from an archive of photographs originally used for other purposes. It has a reversible cover, making it possible to disguise the autobiography as The Luckiest Kids in the World: The Pony Party by Loney M. Setnick (an anagram for Lemony Snicket). The reversible cover also includes a back cover summary which describes the book as "delightfully appropriate".

The book helps clear up some loose ends from the series, but it also introduces many more mysteries, as well as elucidates details which readers might have missed in previous books. It also answers and raises many questions about the mysterious V.F.D. organization, a key player in A Series of Unfortunate Events.

It confirmed the membership of several characters in the series with the mysterious organization of V.F.D., revealing the codes V.F.D. uses, as they communicate with one another discreetly. The book also reveals the family tree of Lemony Snicket, which has resulted in much speculation.

== Reception ==
This book sold 139,000 paperback copies in the United States in 2003.

Karen Valby of Entertainment Weekly scored the book a B, saying, "...the whole thing is a bit of a vanity project, a bizarre exercise in style and trickery, but it will whet the appetites of fans as they wait for the ninth book. Newcomers, though, should start with The Bad Beginning".

== See also ==
- Lemony Snicket
