= Lemony Snicket bibliography =

This is a list of books by Lemony Snicket, the pen name of American author Daniel Handler. Works published under the name Daniel Handler are not included. Handler, as Snicket, has published 26 fiction novels, thirteen in the main A Series of Unfortunate Events franchise. His works have been translated into more than 40 languages, and have sold more than 65 million copies.

== A Series of Unfortunate Events ==
A Series of Unfortunate Events is a series of children's novels which follows the turbulent lives of Violet, Klaus, and Sunny Baudelaire after their parents' death in an arsonous house fire. The children are placed in the custody of Count Olaf, a man who claims to be their distant cousin, who begins to abuse them and openly plots to embezzle their inheritance. After the Baudelaires are removed from his care by their parents' estate executor, Arthur Poe, Olaf begins to doggedly hunt the children down, bringing about the murder of a multitude of characters.

The entire series is actively narrated by Snicket, who makes numerous references to his mysterious, deceased love interest, Beatrice. Both Snicket and Beatrice play roles in the story along with Snicket's family members, all of whom are part of an overarching conspiracy known to the children only as "V.F.D."

Since the release of the first novel, The Bad Beginning, the books have gained significant popularity, critical acclaim, and commercial success worldwide, spawning a film, video game, assorted merchandise and a television series on Netflix. The thirteen books in the series have collectively sold more than 65 million copies and have been translated into 41 languages.

=== The Bad Beginning ===
The Bad Beginning is the first novel in A Series of Unfortunate Events. After the Baudelaire children learn their parents have died in a mansion fire, their banker Arthur Poe puts the Baudelaires in the custody of their distant cousin Count Olaf. Olaf neglects, abuses, and openly plots to embezzle the orphans with the help of his theater troupe. He orders the children to take part in his troupe's performance of The Marvelous Marriage, with Violet as the bride. Klaus learns from a legal book lent by their kindly neighbor, Justice Strauss, that if Olaf marries Violet, he will have access to their inheritance. When he confronts Olaf, the count traps Sunny in a birdcage and threatens her life if the children do not cooperate. On the night of the performance, Strauss plays the part of the judge, unwittingly officiating over a real marriage. When the performance is over, Olaf releases Sunny, but the orphans reveal his plot to Strauss, who annuls the marriage on a technicality, and to Poe, who arrests Olaf. The count and his troupe escape and promise to steal the Baudelaires' fortune and kill them. Strauss offers to take custody of the children, but Poe explains that their parents' will specifies only relatives as guardians.

=== The Reptile Room ===
The Reptile Room is the second novel in A Series of Unfortunate Events. Violet, Klaus, and Sunny are sent to live with their distant in-law, the herpetologist Dr. Monty Montgomery. Monty's profession involves traveling to exotic locations and cataloguing new species of reptiles. His most recent find is the Incredibly Deadly Viper, a large and intelligent but harmless snake. Monty's assistant, Gustav Sebald, has disappeared, and in time for an expedition to Peru, the herpetologist's new assistant Stephano (who is Count Olaf in disguise) arrives. The Baudelaires try to warn Monty, but when the herpetologist finally begins to suspect Stephano, he is murdered with the venom of one of his own snakes. Olaf plans to take the children to Peru, but the children's banker, Arthur Poe, arrives and learns of Monty's death. Olaf, still disguised as Stephano, convinces Poe that one of the snakes must have killed the herpetologist. Unable to convince Poe that Stephano is Olaf, Violet searches through the count's belongings for evidence while Sunny and Klaus pretend to be attacked by the Incredibly Deadly Viper. When Violet finds a syringe of snake venom, Olaf escapes before Poe can arrest him.

=== The Wide Window ===
The Wide Window is the third novel in A Series of Unfortunate Events. Violet, Klaus, and Sunny are sent to live with their distant relative Josephine Anwhistle, a widow who lives on a cliff over Lake Lachrymose. Josephine, whose husband Ike was eaten by the leeches of Lake Lachrymose, has numerous phobias which include seemingly everything but the lake, which can be seen through a large window in her library. When word of a hurricane reaches the town, Josephine goes to buy provisions in town, where she meets Captain Julio Sham, who is actually Count Olaf in disguise. When Josephine returns, the Baudelaires hear the library window shatter and discover a suicide note from Josephine leaving them in Sham's custody. Arthur Poe arrives and begins work with Olaf (still in disguise) on the custody papers. While waiting in the house, the children discover the message "Curdled Cave" hidden in the suicide note. The orphans find the cave on a map of the lake but are forced to flee when the hurricane destroys Josephine's house. Stealing one of Sham's rental boats, the Baudelaires head through the hurricane to the cave, where Josephine is hiding. The widow explains that Olaf threatened her life if she did not give him the children, but the Baudelaires force her return with them as evidence for Poe. On the way they are intercepted by Olaf, who takes them aboard his boat and pushes Josephine into the lake, where she is eaten by the leeches. Nonetheless, the Baudelaires convince Poe that Sham is Olaf. The count escapes once again.

=== The Miserable Mill ===
The Miserable Mill is the fourth novel in A Series of Unfortunate Events. Violet, Klaus, and Sunny are sent to live with Sir, the co-owner of a lumber company. Unbeknownst to Mr. Poe, they are forced to work unpaid in the mill, where they befriend the optimistic worker Phil and the company's other co-owner, Charles. The lumbermill's unscrupulous foreman, Flacutono, breaks Klaus's glasses. When Klaus returns from the optometrist, he behaves strangely for some time. When Klaus's glasses are broken again, the children together visit the optometrist, a Dr. Georgina Orwell, only to find that she is a hypnotist working with Count Olaf, who is disguised as her receptionist Shirley Sinoit-Pécer. Olaf plans to coerce the hypnotic Klaus into murdering Charles, after which he (as Shirley) will offer to become the children's guardian and relieve Sir of the burden. The plan is foiled by Violet, who discovers how to unhypnotize her brother, and in the process Orwell is killed, but Sir still wishes to relinquish custody to Shirley. Poe arrives, and learning that the children have been forced to work, he removes Sir's custody. The children convince Poe that Shirley is Olaf, but the count escapes with Flacutono, who was one of his associates in disguise. Poe explains that he cannot keep finding new guardians for the children, and that they will have to attend boarding school.

=== The Austere Academy ===
The Austere Academy is the fifth novel in A Series of Unfortunate Events. Violet, Klaus, and Sunny are sent to Prufrock Preparatory School, an academy overseen by the tyrannic Vice Principal Nero. While treated poorly and confined to a shack outside the dormitories, the children befriend fellow students and triplets Duncan and Isadora Quagmire, who lost their brother and parents in a fire similar to the Baudelaires'. All five children are persistently taunted by their obnoxious classmate Carmelita Spats. When the Quagmires learn of the Baudelaires' troubles and note the similarity of their plights, the triplets begin to research Count Olaf in the school library's records. Olaf soon arrives disguised as Genghis, the school's new gym teacher. He begins the aptly names "Special Orphan Running Exercises" (S.O.R.E.) for the Baudelaires, forcing them to spend every night running laps out on the field. Unable to stay awake during the day, the children begin failing their classes. Finally Nero announces that if they do not each pass a special exam, they will be expelled and placed in private tutoring with Genghis. On the night before the exams, the Quagmires disguise themselves as the Baudelaires (using a bag of flour for Sunny) and take their places for S.O.R.E., leaving Violet, Klaus, and Sunny to study for their exams. The next morning Poe arrives and the children pass their exams. When they convince Poe that Genghis is Olaf, the count escapes to black car driven by two of his associates, and the Baudelaires see that he has kidnapped the Quagmires. Duncan tries to tell the Baudelaires a secret he and his sister have discovered about Count Olaf, but all the children can hear is "V.F.D."

=== The Ersatz Elevator ===
The Ersatz Elevator is the sixth novel in A Series of Unfortunate Events. Violet, Klaus, and Sunny are sent to live with Jerome and Esmé Squalor, a wealthy couple who live in the penthouse of a 66-story apartment complex in the city. While Jerome is kindly toward the orphans, Esmé is obsessed with fashion and constantly occupied in her collaboration with a man named Gunther on a fashion auction known as the In Auction. When the children finally meet Gunther, they realize he is Count Olaf in disguise. When Olaf leaves the apartment complex without passing the doorman, the orphans search for a secret exit, and discover that there is an extra elevator door on the 66th floor which leads to an empty elevator shaft. The children make a rope and lower themselves down until they reach a room in which they find Duncan and Isadora Quagmire trapped in a cage. The Baudelaires climb back up the shaft to find a means of rescue for Quagmires, but when they return the triplets are gone. The children return and find Esmé, who tells them she is working with Olaf, then pushes them into the shaft, where they are caught in a net. Sunny climbs the shaft using her teeth and retrieves the rope, then the children climb down to the bottom, where they discover a tunnel which leads to a secret door in the ruins of their former home. The children head to the In Auction to find Olaf and Esmé; at the auction they find Mr. Poe and Jerome. The children expose Olaf and Esmé, and to Jerome's dismay, the count announces Esmé is his girlfriend, then the two villains escape. Jerome announces he will take the orphans far away from their troubles, but the Baudelaires are unwilling to desert the Quagmires. Jerome relinquishes his custody back to Poe and leaves the children.

=== The Vile Village ===
The Vile Village is the seventh novel in A Series of Unfortunate Events. The Baudelaires are sent to a village called V.F.D. They believe it has something to do with the secret the Quagmire triplets mentioned before they were kidnapped. The Baudelaires are treated cruelly by the villagers, but their guardian Hector is nice, if a bit skittish. The children find couplets once a day, and think the Quagmires are trying to communicate with them. The people in the village find someone with a unibrow and an eye tattoo on his ankle like Count Olaf has but the children know it is not Count Olaf. The townsfolk decide to execute him but the day before his execution, the suspect has been murdered and Count Olaf blames the children. The children are arrested; they manage to escape the jail and find the Quagmires, having found the hidden message in Isadora's couplets. The Quagmires escape with Hector in a hot air balloon built by Hector, but the children are forced to flee the town.

=== The Hostile Hospital ===
The Hostile Hospital is the eighth novel in A Series of Unfortunate Events. Now seen as murderers, the Baudelaires try to contact Mr. Poe via telegram. Whilst waiting for Mr. Poe to reply, they are recognised as murderers, and escape to Heimlich Hospital with a group of volunteers. When at the hospital, they work for a man named Hal in the Library of Records, where they try to obtain the "Snicket file" which contains information about them. Count Olaf becomes head of the hospital and captures Violet. Klaus and Sunny later realise Count Olaf plans to cut off her head, so they rescue Violet by disguising themselves as nurses. Once Olaf and his associates realise their plan is foiled, one of them sets the hospital on fire and the children are forced to escape in the trunk of Count Olaf's car.

=== The Carnivorous Carnival ===
The Carnivorous Carnival is the ninth novel in A Series of Unfortunate Events. The children travel to the Hinterlands after escaping Heimlich Hospital by riding of the trunk of Count Olaf's car. This book takes place in the Caligari Carnival run by Madame Lulu, a mysterious fortune teller. Violet, Klaus and Sunny disguise themselves as carnival freaks to be hired by Madame Lulu and figure out a few of their mysterious questions.

=== The Slippery Slope ===
The Slippery Slope is the tenth novel in A Series of Unfortunate Events. The children travel to the Mortmain Mountains after escaping yet another fire at the Caligari Carnival. Sunny gets separated from Violet and Klaus. Violet and Klaus meet up with another volunteer soon discovered as Quigley Quagmire, the long lost triplet of the Quagmire Family. He helps Violet and Klaus make their way to the destroyed VFD headquarters. With Violet and Klaus working on the burned headquarters and Sunny eavesdropping Count Olaf, the Baudelaires learn much more about the secret organization of V.F.D.

=== The Grim Grotto ===
The Grim Grotto is the eleventh novel in A Series of Unfortunate Events. The story takes place in a submarine, the Queequeg. The Queequeg only has 3 members: Captain Widdershins, a member of V.F.D.; Phil, the chef (who previously appeared in "The Miserable Mill"); and Fiona, Captain Widdershins' stepdaughter. The Baudelaires join this crew on the submarine and search for the sugar bowl, but run into Count Olaf along the way.

=== The Penultimate Peril ===
The Baudelaire orphans go to Hotel Denouement where they meet Kit Snicket, Lemony's sister, and disguise themselves as concierges and flaneur, a term Handler uses as a person who observes things, the orphans have to find out who is a volunteer and who is a villain. While the orphans encounter people from their past the sugar bowl is being delivered. They must detect if a manager is a volunteer named Frank, or a villain, named Ernest. The children encounter a harpoon gun, a rooftop sunbathing salon, two mysterious initials, J.S, three unidentified triplets, and an unsavory curry.

=== The End ===
The End is the thirteenth novel in A Series of Unfortunate Events. In this book, the Baudelaires are stranded on a boat with Olaf. They are shipwrecked on an island and discover its inhabitants are planning to mutiny. Everyone on the island is poisoned by Medusoid Mycellium when the leader of the island, Ishmael, shoots Olaf with a harpoon gun and hits the fungus which Olaf was hiding. The islanders flee the island; Olaf dies and the Baudelaires manage to survive by eating an apple containing horseradish. There is an epilogue at the end of the book, titled "Chapter Fourteen", set a year later.

== Other Unfortunate Events canon ==
=== The Unauthorized Autobiography ===
Lemony Snicket: The Unauthorized Autobiography (2002) is a fictional autobiography of Lemony Snicket released in conjunction with A Series of Unfortunate Events. The Autobiography tells the story of Snicket's childhood and abduction by V.F.D. using letters, newspaper clippings, and other memorabilia.

=== The Dismal Dinner ===
"Mysterious Messages Concerning the Dismal Dinner" (2004), commonly called "The Dismal Dinner", is a short miniseries by Lemony Snicket which ties in with A Series of Unfortunate Events, set before The Bad Beginning. The four-part series was released in 2004 with Lunchables in promotion of the film. The series describes a scene at the fourth-to-last dinner party held by Bertrand and Beatrice Baudelaire before their deaths. Each part includes a clue which together spell out: Olaf was there.

Snicket describes a dinner party in which "at least two guests were disguised as desserts". As Bertrand Baudelaire is about to cut into these desserts and several guests are passing around "the sugar bowl", Sunny Baudelaire sees a man with an "exceptionally large and sharp" nose looking through the window and shrieks, "Funcoot!", which Snicket glosses as, "I believe I may have seen someone lurking outside" ("Al Funcoot" is an anagrammatic pseudonym of Count Olaf). Klaus, having just read Taking the Teeth Out of Teething, believes that Sunny is teething, prompting Violet to create a device using "a silver pie server and the ear of the snowman ice sculpture" (likely one and the same as "the guest disguised as the ice sculpture [who] wore a bowtie") to soothe Sunny's teeth. The figure in the window disappears, and Sunny calms down. Snicket concludes that the occasion was a "fateful event".

=== The Beatrice Letters ===
The Beatrice Letters (2006) is a collection of fictional letters between Lemony Snicket, Beatrice Baudelaire (the siblings' mother), and a second Beatrice, released as part of A Series of Unfortunate Events. Letters between Snicket and the elder Beatrice tells the story of their childhood, romance, and eventual separation. Letters from the younger Beatrice tells of the lives of the Baudelaire orphans after the events of The End.

=== 13 Shocking Secrets you'll wish you never knew about Lemony Snicket ===
13 Shocking Secrets you'll wish you never knew about Lemony Snicket (2006) is a promotional pamphlet containing thirteen "secrets" about Lemony Snicket; the final secret is found by decoding a puzzle. It was distributed through the HarperCollins AuthorTracker mailing list and on the Lemony Snicket website in promotion of The End. The day after the pamphlet was published, HarperCollins issued a press release revealing that Lemony Snicket had finished writing The End, the final book in the series. The final secret is also echoed near the bottom of the "Dear Reader" letter for volume 13, The End.

== Unfortunate Events companion books ==
=== The Blank Book ===
The Blank Book (HarperCollins, March 2004, ISBN 0-06-058656-7) is the first of two commonplace books in the Unfortunate Events franchise. It is a 176-page hardcover journal.

Commonplace books are used in the series by many protagonists, including the Quagmire family, Jacques Snicket and Klaus Baudelaire, to write notes on their experiences and discoveries.

The bottom of each page is printed with quotations from A Series of Unfortunate Events and illustrations by Brett Helquist. There is also a sheet of Unfortunate Events stickers. The cover illustration shows Count Olaf surrounded by fire, smiling and holding a dip pen.

=== The Notorious Notations ===
The Notorious Notations (February 2006, ISBN 0-06-087235-7) is the second of two commonplace books in the Unfortunate Events franchise. It is also 176 pages long, hardcover and contains quotations from the books and illustrations by Brett Helquist.

The cover illustration features a silhouette of Count Olaf in profile.

=== The Puzzling Puzzles ===
The Puzzling Puzzles: Bothersome Games Which Will Bother Some People is a spin-off first published in 2004 as a promotion for the movie Lemony Snicket's A Series of Unfortunate Events. The original paperback book is 96 pages long.

The Puzzling Puzzles contains puzzles related to both the books and the film. Many of the puzzles are unsolvable or trick questions; for example, one refers to a black and white picture of a restaurant and asks about the color of the maître d's socks. The last page reveals that the book is a training manual for V.F.D.

The second U.S. edition (2006) has a new cover (see image, from artwork in The Bad Beginning: Special Edition), sixteen new puzzles, and an additional introduction by R. In the United Kingdom, another edition was released February 2007 with the new cover but does not contain the new U.S. contents.

== All the Wrong Questions ==
All the Wrong Questions is a four-part book series written by Lemony Snicket. It is a prequel to his previous series, A Series of Unfortunate Events. The series features Snicket's apprenticeship as he investigates crimes with S. Theodora Markson, his chaperone, in the town called Stain'd-by-the-Sea.

=== Who Could That Be at This Hour? ===
Who Could That Be at This Hour? is the first book in All the Wrong Questions. Lemony Snicket, who is a member of a secret organization, narrates his experience while he is taking apprenticeship to his chaperone. In this book, Snicket and his chaperone are assigned to find a lost statue known as The Bombinating Beast.

=== When Did You See Her Last? ===
When Did You See Her Last? is the second book in All the Wrong Questions. Snicket, who is still under apprenticeship to his chaperone, is once again assigned to investigate and search for the Knight's only daughter, Ms. Cleo Knight.

=== Shouldn't You Be in School? ===
Shouldn't You Be in School? is the third book in All the Wrong Questions. Snicket, who continues his apprenticeship to a secret organization, is assigned to investigate a case involving arson, although is suspicious of those who hired him. Two further events of arson occur in the book, along with a plan to burn down the library that Snicket thwarts.

=== Why Is This Night Different from All Other Nights? ===
Why Is This Night Different from All Other Nights? is the fourth book in All the Wrong Questions.

=== File Under: 13 Suspicious Incidents ===
Released on April 1, 2014, File Under: 13 Suspicious Incidents is a companion book in All the Wrong Questions. The book is a collection of short stories in which Snicket recounts thirteen investigations he undertook while staying in Stain'd-by-the-Sea; the reader is encouraged to try and work out the solutions to each one before reading the answer in the back of the book.

== Other works ==
=== Comics for Little Lit: It Was a Dark and Silly Night... ===
Comics for Little Lit: It Was a Dark and Silly Night..., released in 2003, is a collection of comics by many different authors including Lemony Snicket.

=== The Bears' Famous Invasion of Sicily 2005 ===
The Bears' Famous Invasion of Sicily 2005 includes an introduction by Lemony Snicket.

=== Noisy Outlaws, Unfriendly Blobs, and Some Other Things That Aren't as Scary, Maybe, Depending on How You Feel About Lost Lands, Stray Cellphones, Creatures from the Sky, Parents Who Disappear in Peru, a Man Named Lars Farf, and One Other Story We Couldn't Quite Finish, So Maybe You Could Help Us Out ===
Noisy Outlaws, Unfriendly Blobs, and Some Other Things That Aren't as Scary, Maybe, Depending on How You Feel About Lost Lands, Stray Cellphones, Creatures from the Sky, Parents Who Disappear in Peru, a Man Named Lars Farf, and One Other Story We Couldn't Quite Finish, So Maybe You Could Help Us Out, released in 2005, includes an introduction and unfinished short story by Lemony Snicket.

=== Half-Minute Horrors ===
Half-Minute Horrors is a collection of short horror stories from various authors and includes a short story by Lemony Snicket.

=== The Exquisite Corpse Adventure ===
The Exquisite Corpse Adventure, released in 2011, includes two short stories by Lemony Snicket.

=== 13 Words ===
13 Words is a picture book. It is illustrated by Maira Kalman. It tells a story through 13 words: bird, despondent, cake, dog, busy, convertible, goat, hat, haberdashery, scarlet, baby, panache, and mezzo-soprano. It erroneously defines a haberdashery as a hat shop.

=== The Baby in the Manger ===
The Baby in the Manger is a secular Nativity story.

=== The Composer Is Dead ===
The Composer Is Dead is a murder mystery about the killing of a composer, with text by Snicket and music by Nathaniel Stookey. It takes place in an orchestra, and is designed to help introduce children to the parts of an orchestra. It was conceived of as a more modern version of the well-known Prokofiev piece Peter and the Wolf.

=== Horseradish ===
Horseradish: Bitter Truths You Can't Avoid' is a book of quotes partly drawn from A Series of Unfortunate Events.

=== The Latke Who Couldn't Stop Screaming ===
The Latke Who Couldn't Stop Screaming, with illustrations by Lisa Brown, is about an irate latke at Hanukkah who escapes from being boiled in a hot frying pan. He runs into various Christmas symbols (such as fairy lights, a candy cane and pine tree) who are all ignorant and uneducated about the customs of Hanukkah. The latke attempts to educate these people about the history and culture surrounding the Jewish holiday, but his attempts are always in vain and he runs away from each encounter in a fit of frustration.

=== The Lump of Coal ===
The Lump of Coal is a Christmas story. A living lump of coal falls off a barbecue grill. He wishes for a miracle to happen. The lump of coal is artistic and wants to be an artist. He goes in search of something. First, he finds an art gallery that, he believes, shows art by lumps of coal. But when he comes in, he sadly discovers the art is by humans who use lumps of coal. He then finds a Korean restaurant called Wongs Korean Restaurant and Secretarial School. But he goes in and discovers that all things used must be 100% Korean (although the owner does not use a Korean name or proper Korean spices). The lump of coal continues down the street and runs into a man dressed like Santa. The lump of coal tells the man about his problem, and the man gets an idea. He suggests he put the lump of coal in his bratty son's stocking. The son finds it and is ecstatic. He has wanted to make art with coal. So he makes portraits and he and the lump of coal become rich. They move to Korea and open an actual genuine Korean restaurant and have a gallery of their art.

=== The Chronicles of Harris Burdick: Fourteen Amazing Authors Tell the Tales ===
Lemony Snicket wrote the introduction to the anthology book inspired by The Mysteries of Harris Burdick by Chris Van Allsburg.

=== New American Haggadah ===
The New American Haggadah (edited by Jonathan Safran Foer, translation by Nathan Englander) is a contemporary translation of the Haggadah. Lemony Snicket is one of the commentators.

=== The Dark ===
Released in 2013, The Dark was illustrated by Jon Klassen. It's about a boy, Laszlo, overcoming his fear of the dark by confronting the object of his fear.

=== The Complete Peanuts: 1989 to 1990 ===
The Complete Peanuts: 1989 to 1990, released in October 2013, is a collection of all of the published Peanuts comics from January 1989 to December 1990 and is part of The Compete Peanuts series. Lemony Snicket wrote the introduction.

=== 29 Myths on the Swinster Pharmacy ===
29 Myths on the Swinster Pharmacy, illustrated by Lisa Brown, was released in February 2014. It focuses on a mysterious pharmacy, and is set in Stain'd-by-the-Sea, the same town featured in All The Wrong Questions.

=== Goldfish Ghost ===
Goldfish Ghost, illustrated by Lisa Brown, was released in May 2017. The picture book details what happens after a pet goldfish dies.

=== Guys Read: Heroes & Villains ===
Guys Read: Heroes & Villains, released in 2017, is a book in the Guys Write for Guys Read series and includes The Hero of The Story, a short story by Lemony Snicket.

=== The Bad Mood and the Stick ===
The Bad Mood and the Stick, illustrated by Matthew Forsythe, was released in October 2017. The picture book details the way that moods (both bad and good) are spread through simple actions.

=== Swarm of Bees ===
Swarm of Bees, illustrated by Rilla Alexander, was released in April 2019. The picture book details what happened when a mischievous boy released a swarm of bees.

=== Read Something Else: Collected & Dubious Wit & Wisdom of Lemony Snicket ===
Read Something Else: Collected & Dubious Wit & Wisdom of Lemony Snicket, released in April 2019, is the second book of quotes released by Lemony Snicket. Many of the quotes are from previous published works, though some are original to the book. The book also includes artwork by fans.

=== Poison for Breakfast ===
Poison for Breakfast, released in August 2021, follows Lemony Snicket himself as he finds a note under his door informing him that he had poison for breakfast.

== See also ==
- Lemony Snicket
