= Tony Hale =

American actor (born 1970)

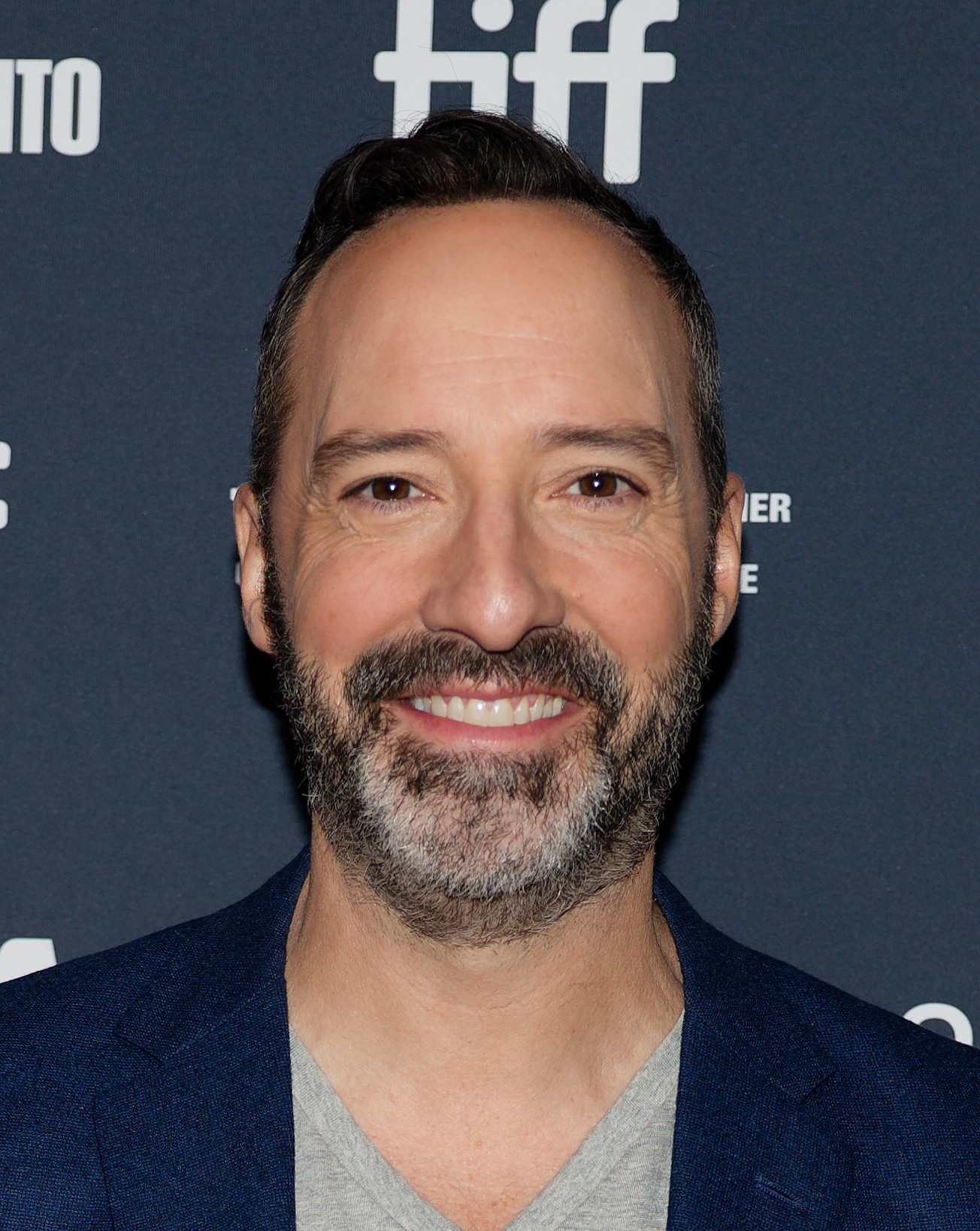
- Hale in 2024
- Born: September 30, 1970 (age 56); West Point, New York, U.S.
- Education: Samford University (BA); Regent University (MA)
- Occupations: Actor; comedian
- Years active: 1997–present
- Spouse: Martel Thompson (m. 2003)
- Children: 1
- Awards: Primetime Emmy Award for Outstanding Supporting Actor in a Comedy Series (2013, 2015)

Tony Hale (born September 30, 1970) is an American actor and comedian. He had a leading role in the Fox series Arrested Development as Buster Bluth from 2003 to 2019, and portrayed Gary Walsh on the HBO series Veep from 2012 to 2019. For the latter, Hale won the 2013 and 2015 Primetime Emmy Award for Outstanding Supporting Actor in a Comedy Series.

Hale has appeared in feature films including Because I Said So (2007), The Informant! (2009), In My Sleep (2010), The Heat (2013), Alvin and the Chipmunks: The Road Chip (2015), Clifford the Big Red Dog (2021), Hocus Pocus 2 (2022), and Quiz Lady (2023). He has provided voice acting work for The Tale of Despereaux (2008), The Angry Birds Movie (2016), The Angry Birds Movie 2 (2019), the Toy Story franchise (2019–26) as Forky, Lego Star Wars: Terrifying Tales (2021) as Vaneé, and Inside Out 2 (2024) as Fear, replacing Bill Hader from the first film. Hale also created the Netflix and Peacock original series Archibald's Next Big Thing, and voiced the titular character. He plays twin brothers Nicholas Benedict and L.D. Curtain in the Disney+ original The Mysterious Benedict Society (2021–22).

== Early life and education ==
Hale was born on September 30, 1970, in West Point, New York. His mother, Rita (née Garnett), worked as a staff assistant to State Representative Kathy Ashe, and his father, Mike Hale, taught nuclear and atomic physics and served in the military. Hale grew up in Tallahassee, Florida, where he attended the Young Actors Theatre and participated in numerous theatrical and musical productions. He graduated from Leon High School in 1988. He graduated from Samford University in Birmingham, Alabama, with a journalism degree in 1992. He became a member of Sigma Chi while at the university. He completed graduate studies in 1995 from the School of Communication and the Arts of Regent University in Virginia. After graduating, he lived in New York City for eight years. While in New York, Hale helped found The Haven, an artistically minded community of Christians that meets weekly. He studied acting at The Barrow Group, as well as at the William Esper Studio in the Professional Actor Training Program.

== Career ==
=== 1997–2002: Early roles ===
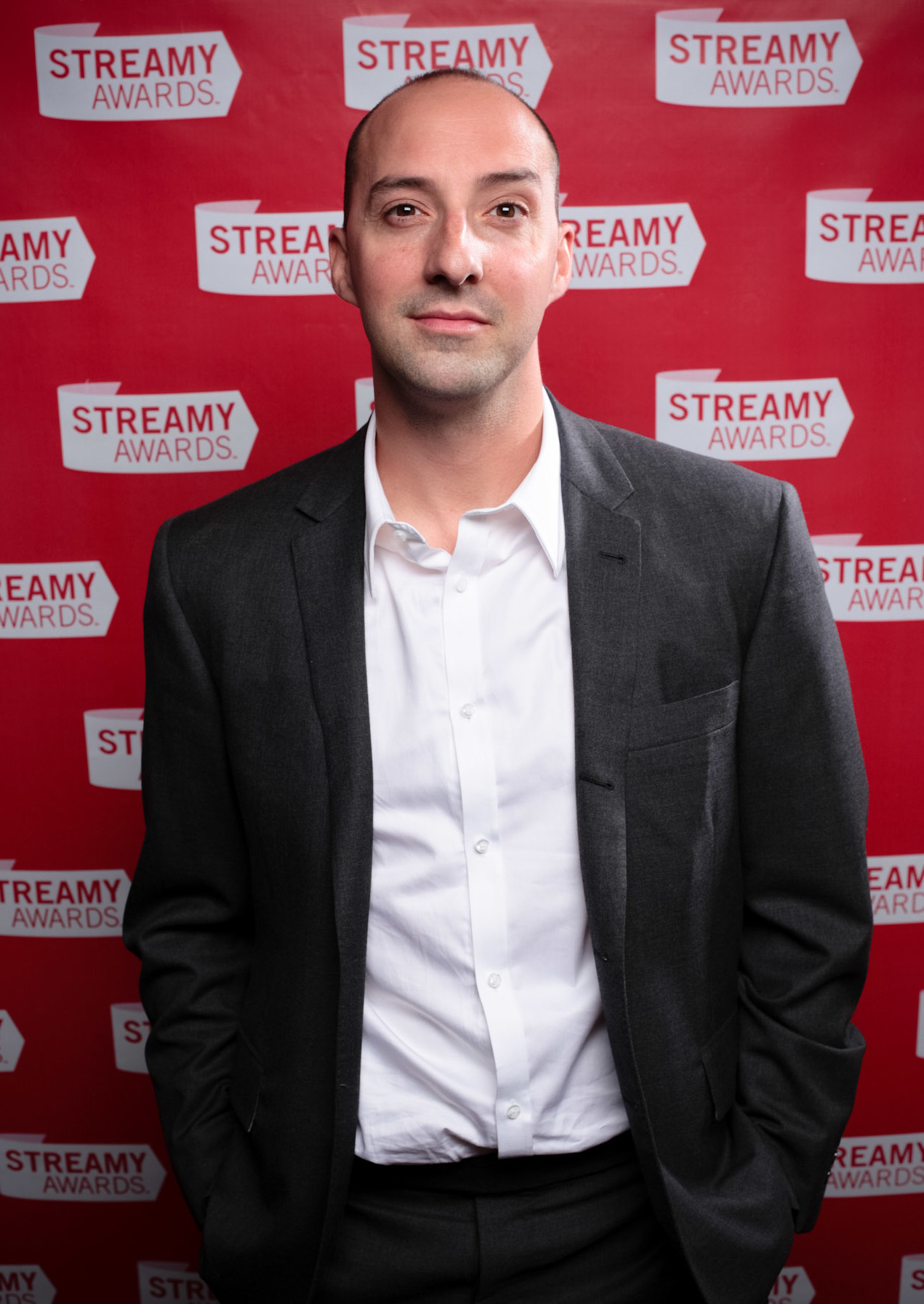
Hale at the 2nd Streamy Awards in 2010

Hale obtained his Screen Actors Guild card when he appeared in a commercial for MCI Inc., though it never aired. He made minor guest appearances in TV shows such as Dawson's Creek, The Sopranos, and Sex and the City.

=== 2003–13: Arrested Development ===
From 2003 to 2006, and also in 2013, 2018, and 2019, Hale found success in television cast as Buster Bluth, the hapless, neurotic son on Arrested Development. Hale appeared in a season ten episode of MADtv in a parody of Cops, where two British robbers try to stop a domestic dispute among the royal family. In March 2006, Hale was cast in a co-starring role as the video store owner Simon in the NBC sitcom Andy Barker, P.I., starring Andy Richter and co-created by Conan O'Brien. He appeared in minor roles in Stranger Than Fiction and Because I Said So. He was the voice of Furlough in The Tale of Despereaux, an animated children's film released in 2008. Hale had a recurring role as Emmett on Chuck, beginning in October 2008 and ending in January 2010. His departure made room for his starring role on the NBC web series Ctrl, which premiered on July 13, 2009. He appeared in a cameo in the second episode of the first season of Showtime's dramedy United States of Tara, as English teacher Oral Gershenoff. He joined the cast of Numbers in 2009, in the recurring role of Professor Russell Lazlo.

=== 2012–19: Veep and acclaim ===
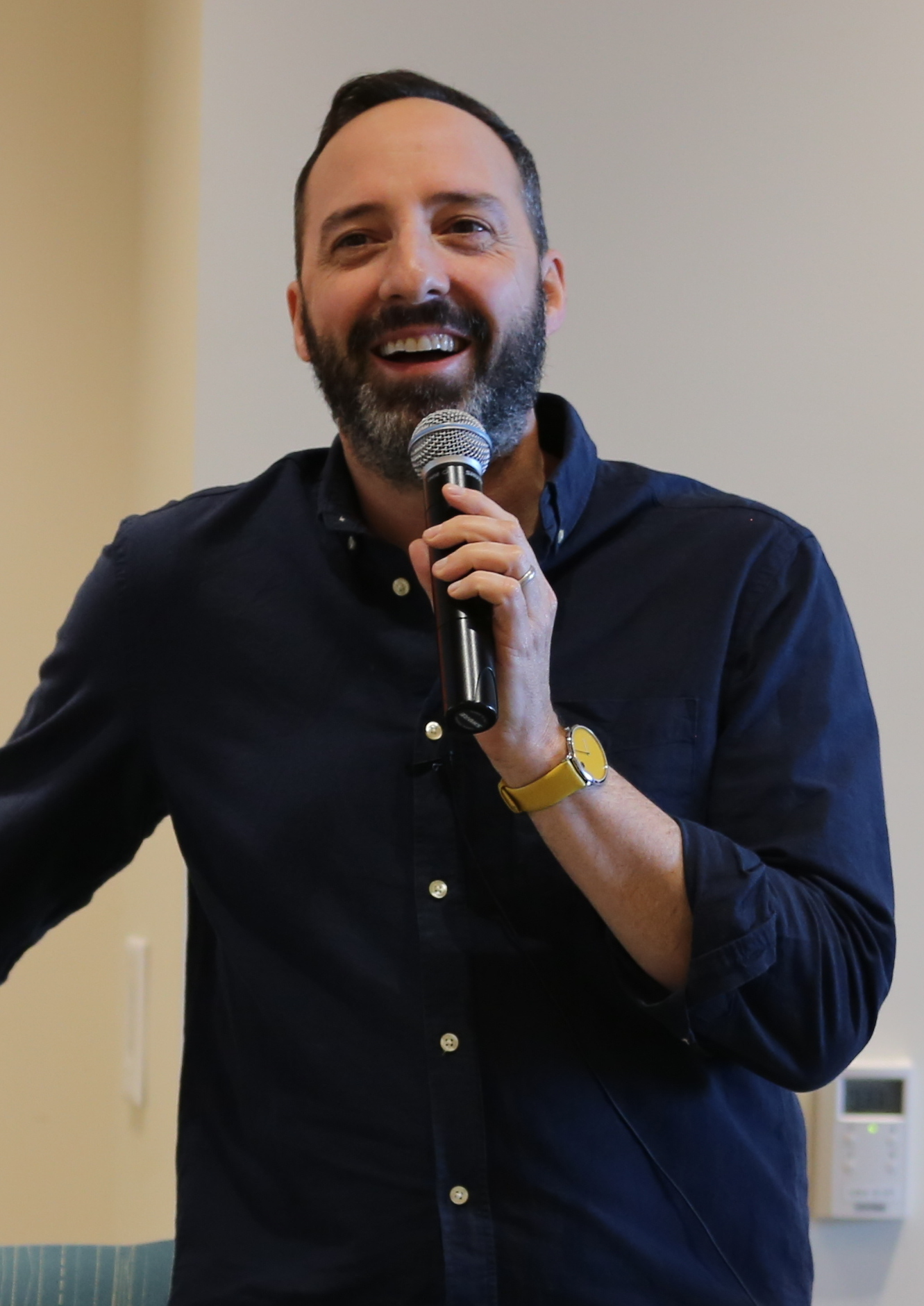
Hale speaking at Pepperdine University in 2019

In 2012, Hale starred in the drama comedy Not That Funny. He guest-starred on NBC's Law & Order: SVU as Rick Simms, a teacher who is fired from his job after being accused of inappropriate behavior with a student. In 2012, Hale was cast in the HBO comedy Veep as Gary Walsh, the personal assistant to Vice President-turned-President Selina Meyer (portrayed by Julia Louis-Dreyfus). On September 22, 2013, Hale won a Primetime Emmy Award for Outstanding Supporting Actor in a Comedy Series for his work in the show's second season. This was his first major award. He earned his second nomination in 2014, but lost the award to Ty Burrell. Hale won his second Primetime Emmy Award with his third nomination in 2015, in the same ceremony where Veep won its first Primetime Emmy Award for Outstanding Comedy Series.

In 2017, Hale hosted the 9th Annual Shorty Awards at the PlayStation Theater in New York City. In 2018, Hale played the role of Jerome Squalor on the second season of the Netflix comedy drama series A Series of Unfortunate Events, appearing in episodes adapting The Ersatz Elevator and The Penultimate Peril. He appeared in two more episodes of the series. In 2019, he voiced Forky in Pixar's Toy Story 4 and reprised the role again in the 10-episode short-form educational series Forky Asks a Question.

=== 2020–present ===
In 2022, Hale played Jefry Traske and his descendant Reverend Traske in Hocus Pocus 2, a sequel to 1993's Hocus Pocus. In 2024, Hale voiced Fear in Pixar's Inside Out 2, replacing Bill Hader who voiced the character in the first film. Hale reprised his role as Forky in Toy Story 5, released in June 2026.

In 2025 he was named alumnus of the year by his alma mater, Samford University, and received an honorary Doctor of Fine Arts degree from the university on December 13, 2025.

== Personal life ==
Hale married Emmy Award–winning makeup artist Martel Thompson on May 24, 2003. They have a daughter born in February 2006. Hale and his wife are practicing Christians and reside in Birmingham, Alabama.

== Filmography ==
=== Film ===
Year	Title	Role	Notes
1999	Raging Hormones	Wiseguy Driver	
2003	My Blind Brother	Bill	
2004	Stateside	Donny	
2005	Fortunes	Phil Yount	
2006	Larry the Cable Guy: Health Inspector	Jack Dabbs	
2006	RV	Frank	
2006	Stranger Than Fiction	Dave	
2006	The Beach Party at the Threshold of Hell	Remington Biographer	
2006	Unaccompanied Minors	Alan Davies	
2006	The Proper Care & Feeding of an American Messiah	Homeowner with demons	
2007	Because I Said So	Stuart	
2007	Dante's Inferno	Pope Nicholas III (voice)	
2007	Flatland: The Movie	King of Pointland (voice)	
2007	Cruel Logic	Dr. Pomerenke	
2008	My Suicide	Social worker	
2008	The Tale of Despereaux	Furlough (voice)	
2008	The Year of Getting to Know Us	Nickie	
2009	The Answer Man	Mailman	
2009	The Informant!	James Epstein	
2009	The Goods: Live Hard, Sell Hard	Wade	
2009	The Ballad of G.I. Joe	Dr. Mindbender	Short film
2009	Weathered	Stanway Steini	Short film
2010	Happythankyoumoreplease	Sam #2	
2010	In My Sleep	Ben	
2011	Sironia	Chad	
2011	Wuss	Mr. Crowder	
2011	Perfect	Gene	Short film
2012	First in Flight	Wilbur Wright	Short film
2012	Not That Funny	Stefan Lane	
2013	The Heat	The John	
2013	The Kings of Summer	Bus Passenger	
2013	The Nobodies	Postal Boss	Short film
2015	Alvin and the Chipmunks: The Road Chip	Air Marshal James Suggs	
2015	American Ultra	Agent Petey Douglas	
2015	April and the Extraordinary World	Darwin (voice)	
2016	Brave New Jersey	Clark Hill	
2016	Last Call	Brinnan	
2016	Yoga Hosers	Bob Collette	
2016	The Angry Birds Movie	Ross / Mime / Cyrus (voices)	
2017	And Then I Go	Mr. Mosley	
2017	Transformers: The Last Knight	Arrogant JPL Engineer	
2018	The 15:17 to Paris	Coach Murray	
2018	Love, Simon	Vice Principal Worth	
2018	Sadie	Bradley	
2018	Batman Ninja	The Joker (voice)	
2019	To the Stars	Gerald Richmond	
2019	Toy Story 4	Forky (voice)	
2019	The Angry Birds Movie 2	Mime (voice)	
2020	Eat Wheaties!	Sid Straw	
2020	Poupelle of Chimney Town	Poupelle (voice)	
2020	Nine Days	Alexander	
2021	Arlo the Alligator Boy	Teeny Tiny Tony (voice)	
2021	Clifford the Big Red Dog	Zac Tieran	
2021	Being the Ricardos	Jess Oppenheimer	
2022	Hocus Pocus 2	Jefry Traske / Reverend Traske	
2023	Woman of the Hour	Ed	
2023	Quiz Lady	Ben Franklin	
2024	Megamind vs. the Doom Syndicate	Mel / Mr. Donut / TV Announcer	Voice
2024	Unfrosted	Eddie Mink	
2024	Inside Out 2	Fear (voice)	
2024	Sketch	Taylor Wyatt	Also producer
2025	Opus	Soledad Yusef	
2025	Horsegirls	Patrick	
2026	Office Romance	George Dudek	
2026	Via Negativa	Father Taboret	
2026	Toy Story 5	Forky (voice)	
2026	The Wrong Girls	Martin Flynn	
2026	Bruton	Kai	
2027	Paris Paramount †		Post-production
TBA	The Stalemate †		Post-production
TBA	Enormous †		Short film; post-production
TBA	Pumping Black †		Filming

=== Television ===
Year	Title	Role	Notes
1997	Ghost Stories	Billy Thorpe	Episode: "Personal Demons"
1998	Legacy	Hyram	Episode: "The Gift"
2000	The Street	Trainee	Episode: "Closet Cases"
2001	Sex and the City	Tiger	Episode: "The Real Me"
2001	King Baby	Various Roles	Sketch comedy
2001	The Sopranos	RN/OCN Collins	Episode: "Second Opinion"
2001	Dawson's Creek	Doctor Bronin	Episode: "A Winter's Tale"
2003–2006, 2013, 2018–2019	Arrested Development	Byron "Buster" Bluth	Main role; 74 episodes
2005	Stacked	Brent Lamble	Episode: "Beat the Candidate"
2007	Big Day	David	Episode: "Last Chance to Marry Jane"
2007	Andy Barker, P.I.	Simon	6 episodes
2008–2010	Chuck	Emmett Milbarge	14 episodes
2008–2009	ER	Norman	2 episodes
2008	Samantha Who?	Dr. Andy Adams	Episode: "The Pill"
2008	United States of Tara	Oral Gershenoff	Episode: "Aftermath"
2008	Rules of Engagement	Steve	Episode: "May Divorce Be With You"
2008	Ctrl	Stuart	Web series
2009–2010	Numbers	Russell Lazlo	2 episodes
2010	The Life & Times of Tim	Vince	Voice; Episode: "Tim's Beard"
2010	Community	Professor Marion Holly	Episode: "Beginner Pottery"
2010	Law & Order	Phillip Shoemaker	Episode: "Brazil"
2010	Justified	David Mortimer	Episode: "The Collection"
2010	Medium	Gil Bureli	Episode: "The Match Game"
2011	Human Target	Harry	2 episodes
2011	Royal Pains	Andy	Episode: "Ta Da For"
2011	NTSF:SD:SUV::	Dr. Karl	Episode: "Dolphinnegan's Wake"
2011	Good Vibes	Wadska	Voice; 12 episodes
2011	Psych	Jerry Kincaid	Episode: "Neil Simon's Lover's Retreat"
2012	Law & Order: Special Victims Unit	Rick Simms	Episode: "Learning Curve"
2012	Up All Night	Dr. Welborn	Episode: "Ma'am'd"
2012–2019	Veep	Gary Walsh	Main role
2013	The High Fructose Adventures of Annoying Orange	Rutabaga / Caesar	Voice; 2 episodes
2013	Doc McStuffins	Tobias The Elf	Voice; Episode: "A Very McStuffins Christmas"
2013–2016	Comedy Bang! Bang!	Himself / King of Cards	2 episodes
2013–2016	Sanjay and Craig	Mr. Noodman / Various voices	Voice
2013–2018	Drunk History	Various	6 episodes
2014	About a Boy	Hugh Womple	Episode: "About a Boy's Dad"
2014	The Birthday Boys	Reginaldo Alphonsy	Episode: "Cerf's Folly"
2015	Jake and the Never Land Pirates	Doctor Undergear	Voice; 4 episodes
2015	Childrens Hospital	Brad Lendricks	Episode: "Me, Owen"
2016	VeggieTales in the House	Yambot	Voice; Episode: "Yambot"
2017	Animals.	Matthew	Voice; Episode: "Worms Birds Possums"
2017	Rick and Morty	Death Stalker Eli	Voice; Episode: "Rickmancing the Stone"
2017	Difficult People	Himself	Episode: "The Silkwood"
2017	Pickle and Peanut	Funwagon	Episode: "Funwagon"
2018–2019	A Series of Unfortunate Events	Jerome Squalor	4 episodes
2018	Rise of the Teenage Mutant Ninja Turtles	Dr. Alex Noe	Voice; Episode: "Todd Scouts"
2018	Mickey and the Roadster Racers	Dr. Victor Von Goose	Voice; Episode: "Super-Charged"
2019	Star vs. the Forces of Evil	The Pie King	Voice; Episode: "Escape from the Pie Folk"
2019	Spirit Riding Free	Bellhop / Waiter	Voice; Episode: "Lucky and the New Frontier"
2019	Ask the StoryBots	The Recycling Plant Owner	Episode: "Why Do We Have To Recycle?"
2019	RuPaul's Drag Race	Himself (Snatch Game contestant, guest judge)	Episode: "Snatch Game at Sea"
2019–2021	Archibald's Next Big Thing	Archibald	Voice; also creator and executive producer
2019–present	Harley Quinn	Doctor Psycho / Felix Faust / Various voices	Voice; main role
2019–2020	Forky Asks a Question	Forky	Voice; main role
2019–2022	Amphibia	Apothecary Gary	Voice; 3 episodes
2020	When the Streetlights Go On	Mr. Boque	4 episodes
2020	The Twilight Zone	Tom	Episode: "Downtime"
2020	Game On!	Himself (contestant)	Episode: "Celebrity Guests: Tony Hale and Bobby Moynihan"
2020	Woke	Butter	Voice; 3 episodes
2020	The George Lucas Talk Show	Himself	Episode: "Streamers of the Lost Art (of Conversation)"
2020–2021	Crossing Swords	Blarney	Voice; 17 episodes
2021–2026	Rugrats	Chas Finster	Voice; main role
2021–2022	Birdgirl	Paul "The Feels"	Voice; main role
2021–2022	The Mysterious Benedict Society	Nicholas Benedict / L.D. Curtain	Main role
2021–2022	The Chicken Squad	Frazz / Bob	Voice; 10 episodes
2021–2023	HouseBroken	Diablo / Max	Voice; main role
2021	I Heart Arlo	Teeny Tiny Tony	Voice; main role
2021	LEGO Star Wars Terrifying Tales	Vaneé	Voice; Television film
2021	Centaurworld	Durpletoot / Tony Durpleton	4 episodes
2022	The Legend of Vox Machina	Sir Fince	Voice; 2 episodes
2022	Password	Himself	Episode: "Tony Hale & Jimmy Fallon"
2022	Wolfboy and the Everything Factory	Water Ancient	Voice; Episode: "We Search for Balance"
2022–2023	Solar Opposites	Little Buddy	Voice; 3 episodes
2023	Family Guy	Allen	Voice; Episode: "Old West"
2023	The Ghost and Molly McGee	Calvin Redtop	Voice; Episode: "Kenny's Falling Star"
2023	Critical Role	Sarge	Episode: "Choose Their Adventure...Again!"
2024	The Decameron	Sirisco	8 episodes
2024	Mickey Mouse Funhouse	Gus	Voice; Episode: "The Giant and the Goof/Call Me Cora!"
2024	Dream Productions	Fear	Voice; 4 episodes
2024	Megamind Rules!	Mel / Mr. Donut	Voice
2025–present	Iron Man and His Awesome Friends	Ultron	Voice; recurring role
2025	Elsbeth	Craig Hollis	Episode: "Bunker Down"
2026	Sofia the First: Royal Magic	Mimsy Fizzlewick	Voice, recurring role

=== Video games ===
Year	Title	Role	Notes
2024	Disney Speedstorm	Fear / Forky	

=== Music videos ===
Year	Artist	Song
2007	Switchfoot	"Awakening"
2008	Fall Out Boy	"Beat It"
2014	Lady A	"Bartender"
2020	David Cross featuring "Weird Al" Yankovic	"Eat It"

=== Theater ===
Year	Title	Role	Notes
2001	King Baby	Various roles	Live sketch comedy
2019	Wakey, Wakey	Guy	
2027	Paddington: The Musical	Mr. Curry	Al Hirschfeld Theater, Broadway

== Awards and nominations ==
Year	Association	Category	Nominated work	Result	Ref(s)
2013	Primetime Emmy Awards	Outstanding Supporting Actor in a Comedy Series	Veep (episodes: "Running", "Crate", "East Wing", "Inauguration","Judge" and "Veep")	Won	
2014	Primetime Emmy Awards	Outstanding Supporting Actor in a Comedy Series	Veep (episodes: "Running", "Crate", "East Wing", "Inauguration","Judge" and "Veep")	Nominated	
2015	Primetime Emmy Awards	Outstanding Supporting Actor in a Comedy Series	Veep (episodes: "Running", "Crate", "East Wing", "Inauguration","Judge" and "Veep")	Won	
2016	Primetime Emmy Awards	Outstanding Supporting Actor in a Comedy Series	Veep (episodes: "Running", "Crate", "East Wing", "Inauguration","Judge" and "Veep")	Nominated	
2017	Primetime Emmy Awards	Outstanding Supporting Actor in a Comedy Series	Veep (episodes: "Running", "Crate", "East Wing", "Inauguration","Judge" and "Veep")	Nominated	
2019	Primetime Emmy Awards	Outstanding Supporting Actor in a Comedy Series	Veep (episodes: "Running", "Crate", "East Wing", "Inauguration","Judge" and "Veep")	Nominated	
2023	Children's and Family Emmy Awards	Outstanding Lead Performance	The Mysterious Benedict Society	Won	
2004	Screen Actors Guild Awards	Outstanding Ensemble in a Comedy Series	Arrested Development (season 1 / season 2 & season 4)	Nominated	
2005	Screen Actors Guild Awards	Outstanding Ensemble in a Comedy Series	Arrested Development (season 1 / season 2 & season 4)	Nominated	
2013	Screen Actors Guild Awards	Outstanding Ensemble in a Comedy Series	Arrested Development (season 1 / season 2 & season 4)	Nominated	
2013	Screen Actors Guild Awards	Outstanding Ensemble in a Comedy Series	Veep (season 2 / season 3 / season 4 / season 5 & season 6)	Nominated	
2014	Screen Actors Guild Awards	Outstanding Ensemble in a Comedy Series	Veep (season 2 / season 3 / season 4 / season 5 & season 6)	Nominated	
2015	Screen Actors Guild Awards	Outstanding Ensemble in a Comedy Series	Veep (season 2 / season 3 / season 4 / season 5 & season 6)	Nominated	
2016	Screen Actors Guild Awards	Outstanding Ensemble in a Comedy Series	Veep (season 2 / season 3 / season 4 / season 5 & season 6)	Nominated	
2017	Screen Actors Guild Awards	Outstanding Ensemble in a Comedy Series	Veep (season 2 / season 3 / season 4 / season 5 & season 6)	Won	
2014	Critics' Choice Television Awards	Best Supporting Actor in a Comedy Series	Veep	Nominated	
2015	Critics' Choice Television Awards	Best Supporting Actor in a Comedy Series	Veep	Nominated	
2016	Critics' Choice Television Awards	Best Supporting Actor in a Comedy Series	Veep	Nominated	
2020	Annie Awards	Outstanding Voice Acting in a Feature Production	Toy Story 4	Nominated	
2022	San Diego International Film Festival	Fairbanks Award	Career Achievement	Awarded	

== Interviews ==
- 2006 Video Interview at About.com
- Interview with Tony Hale at burnsidewriters.com
