= The Beatrice Letters =

2006 book by Lemony Snicket

- Author: Lemony Snicket (pen name of Daniel Handler)
- Illustrator: Brett Helquist
- Cover artist: Brett Helquist
- Language: English
- Series: A Series of Unfortunate Events (companion)
- Genre: Gothic children's fiction
- Publisher: HarperCollins
- Publication date: September 4, 2006 (UK); September 5, 2006 (US)
- Publication place: United States
- Media type: Print (hardback)
- Pages: 72 pp
- ISBN: 0-06-058658-3
- OCLC: 64229864
- LC Class: PZ7.S6795 Bea 2006

The Beatrice Letters is a book by Lemony Snicket. It is a tangential prequel to the children's book series A Series of Unfortunate Events, and was published shortly before the thirteenth and final installment. According to its cover, the book is "suspiciously linked to Book the Thirteenth", although the British edition merely states that it "contains a clue to Book the Thirteenth".

The book consists of thirteen letters, six from Beatrice Baudelaire II to Lemony Snicket, six from Lemony Snicket to Beatrice Baudelaire, and one from Lemony Snicket to his editor (one of these appears in every book in the main series, but this is the first time such a letter has been incorporated into the plot). However, the two Beatrices, despite sharing a name, are clearly separate individuals, and while Lemony Snicket's letters are plainly written beginning from his childhood and ending shortly before Violet Baudelaire is born, the Beatrice writing to Snicket is apparently writing after the events of The End. The older Beatrice is the one referred to throughout A Series of Unfortunate Events by Lemony Snicket as his deceased love, and her identity as the mother of the Baudelaire children from the series is revealed in The Beatrice Letters, but the younger Beatrice's identity is not directly explained, apart from the statement that she also has some connection to Violet, Klaus, and Sunny (although in The End it is revealed that she is the daughter of Kit Snicket). Kit's daughter later ends up being raised by the Baudelaire orphans.

The book contains twelve punch-out letters (of the alphabet, as opposed to correspondence, although the ambiguity is intentional), and each is mentioned in different, interesting ways. An example is that the first letter is an E, juxtaposed against a card from Snicket to Beatrice, in which a map Snicket had drawn forms an E. The cardstock letters can appear to be anagrams of "Beatrice Sank", Beatrice being the boat in the book The End, and "A Snicket Brae", as it has been said that Lemony Snicket lived in the hills for some time. The book also includes a poster of what appears to be the wreckage of the Beatrice, along with a cave, Klaus's glasses, Violet's hair ribbon, and Sunny's cookbooks.

Kidsreads.com praised The Beatrice Letters, claiming "Snicket incorporates what could, surprisingly, be one of the most touching and heartfelt (if absurd) love letters ever written...[it] heightens the stakes, and the anticipation, for Snicket's eagerly awaited Book the Thirteenth."

Over 350,000 copies of the book were sold in the United States in 2006.

== See also ==
- A Series of Unfortunate Events
