= The End (novel) =

2006 children's novel

- Author: Lemony Snicket (pen name of Daniel Handler)
- Illustrator: Brett Helquist
- Language: English
- Series: A Series of Unfortunate Events
- Genre: Gothic fiction Absurdist fiction Mystery
- Publisher: HarperCollins
- Publication date: October 13, 2006
- Publication place: United States
- Media type: Print (hardback & paperback)
- Pages: 324
- ISBN: 0-06-441016-1
- OCLC: 70718171
- LC Class: PZ7.S6795 En 2006
- Preceded by: The Penultimate Peril

Book the Thirteenth: The End is the thirteenth and final novel in the children's novel series A Series of Unfortunate Events by Lemony Snicket. The book was released on October 13, 2006.

== Plot ==
The Baudelaire orphans and Count Olaf are on a boat heading away from the burning Hotel Denouement. After a storm, the Baudelaires arrive and are welcomed on an island by a young girl named Friday. Count Olaf, however, is not welcomed due to his snobby attitude and death threat to Friday.

Later, the pregnant Kit Snicket (who first appeared in The Grim Grotto) arrives on the island on a bunch of books. Count Olaf disguises himself as Kit, but for once, it actually fails to convince anybody. The Islanders, led by a man called Ishmael (who, multiple times, says that "he won't force them" to do what he wants), capture him, put him in a bird cage (just like he did to Sunny in The Bad Beginning) and shun the Baudelaires for possessing forbidden items. Friday still assists them with the help of the Incredibly Deadly Viper (who first appeared in The Reptile Room), which Kit nicknamed Ink, who also ended up on the island sometime before.

That night, two of the islanders sneak out to feed the children, asking them to join a mutiny. Agreeing, the Baudelaires go to the arboretum to collect weapons, where they discover a hidden room with a book that chronicles the history of the island. Ishmael arrives, explaining to the children that their parents were once the island's leaders and were responsible for many improvements in island life, but were eventually overthrown by Ishmael, who brought the island back to a simple and austere way of life while hoarding comforts for himself.

The Baudelaires and Ishmael go back to the other side of the island, where the mutiny is already underway. While everyone is arguing, Ishmael harpoons Olaf in the stomach, inadvertently shattering the helmet containing the Medusoid Mycelium, a deadly fungus, infecting the island's entire population. The Baudelaires run back to the arboretum to find horseradish, a cure for the fungus. While reading through the book left by their parents to find where the horseradish is hidden, the three continue to be affected by the fungus and, after some deliberation, accept their deaths. They eventually find that the cure is in the hybridized apples on a tree in the arboretum, they only barely made it due to the help of Ink. They gather more apples for the other islanders, only to discover that the island people have abandoned the mutiny and boarded their outrigger canoe, preparing to leave the island. Ishmael promises that he will save the islanders by sailing to a horseradish factory, but refuses to give them the apples, despite having already consumed one himself. The Baudelaires manage to toss an apple to Friday before the canoe departs.

At this point, Ink has disappeared, and Kit is about to go into labor. Though she is succumbing to the fungus, she cannot eat the bitter apple due to its unhealthy effects on unborn babies. When Olaf hears that she is still alive, he uses his last effort to get her safely down onto the beach, and kisses Kit before he dies. The Baudelaires help Kit give birth to a baby girl. Kit then dies after requesting that the orphans name the baby after their mother, Beatrice, the very same woman that Lemony had been dedicating the books to. The Baudelaires spend the next year taking care of Kit's daughter, occasionally visiting the graves of Kit and Olaf.

After reading an entry from the history book written by their parents, the Baudelaires decide to leave the island with Beatrice in order to honor their parents' wishes. Despite their fears about the outside world, the children prepare a boat and supplies for their journey back to the mainland; Beatrice says her first word, which is "Beatrice".

== Reception ==
With sales of over 2 million copies in the United States, The End was the bestselling children's book of 2006 according to Publishers Weekly, who also reported 3 million sales of the previous 12 books in the series in the same year.

== Translations ==
- Loppu (in Finnish), WSOY, 2007, ISBN 978-951-0-32760-9.
- 終わり (in Japanese), Soshisha, 2008, ISBN 978-4-7942-1674-8.
- Конец (in Russian), Azbuka, 2007, ISBN 978-5-91181-623-0.
- Τέλος (in Greek), Ελληνικά Γράμματα, 2007, ISBN 9789604429455.
- Norwegian: Slutten, Tor Edvin Dahl, Cappelen Damm, 2007, ISBN 9788202273859
- Polish : "Koniec końców" ("At Long Last", literally: "The End of Ends")
- Thai: "จุดจบ (แห่งความโชคร้าย)", Nanmeebooks Teen, 2007, ISBN 9789749488515

== Adaptation ==
The book was adapted as the seventh and final episode of the third season of the television series adaptation produced by Netflix. In this version, there is no rebellion against Ishmael's rule and the children's parents left of their own volition. The series also ends with an additional scene of a young Beatrice II, Kit's daughter, recounting their subsequent undocumented adventures to Lemony Snicket, a plot point implied to have occurred in The Beatrice Letters.

== Literary References ==
As throughout the series, this book references many classic novels through its setting, characters and tropes. In the final instalment, the Baudelaire siblings find themselves deserted on an island in the middle of the ocean. The island’s coastal shelf is in reference to the final stanza of Philip Larkin’s poem “This Be The Verse,” which is quoted by characters. Many characters' names on the island are references to castaway fiction as confirmed by Daniel Handler in an interview with CNN, including Ishmael from Moby-Dick.
