= Lemony Snicket's A Series of Unfortunate Events (video game) =

2004 video game

- North American cover art for PlayStation 2
- Developer: Adrenium Games (Note: KnowWonder developed the Windows version, while Griptonite Games developed a Game Boy Advance version. Mobile version was developed by JAMDAT.)
- Publishers: Activision; JAMDAT (mobile)
- Engine: Unreal Engine 2 (PC)
- Platforms: Game Boy Advance; GameCube; PlayStation 2; Windows; Xbox; Mobile phone
- Release: PlayStation 2, Xbox, GameCube, Gameboy Advance, Windows: NA: November 9, 2004; PAL: November 25, 2004; Mobile: NA: November 22, 2004
- Genres: Action-adventure; Platform (GBA)
- Mode: Single-player

Lemony Snicket's A Series of Unfortunate Events is a 2004 action-adventure game based on the film of the same name. Players take the roles of Violet, Klaus, and Sunny Baudelaire, solving puzzles, fighting villains and finding objects. Players encounter characters such as Mr. Poe, Uncle Monty, and Aunt Josephine, along with villains such as Count Olaf, the Hook-Handed Man, the White-Faced Women, and the Bald Man with the Long Nose.

Jim Carrey, Emily Browning, and Liam Aiken reprise their roles from the film, while the voice of Lemony Snicket is provided by Tim Curry, who provided narration for the audiobooks for the series.

== Gameplay ==
The core gameplay consists of elements of a platformer, a puzzle game, and a third-person shooter. The player assumes the role of either of the three Baudelaire orphans, and can cycle through them depending on the version.

The Baudelaires can eventually gain access to a multitude of inventions as well as ammunition throughout the game, which are mostly those that tend to run along the lines of things a child might actually attain, such as rotten eggs, Gummy Bears, bees, eau de toilette, and garlic, among other things.

=== Console versions ===
Gameplay screenshot showing Klaus Baudelaire wielding a makeshift battering ram.

The three console versions have the same basic layout – players can switch between playing as Violet, Klaus and, at certain moments, Sunny. The game begins at Count Olaf's house, then progresses to Justice Strauss' home, back to Olaf's, then to Uncle Monty's house, then Damocles Dock, then Aunt Josephine's house, Curdled Cave and, finally, Olaf's again. Along the way, Violet invents things: Klaus's weapon (the Brilliant Bopper); her own weapons (the Fruit Flinger, the Reptile Retriever and the Peppermint Popper); the Baby Booster, which helps Sunny jump; the Steady Stilts, which help Violet reach high places; the Uplifting Umbrella, which helps Violet glide across gaps; the Horrifying Hook, which Klaus uses as a grapple gun; and the Levitating Loafers, which can make Klaus levitate for a brief period of time. In the game, the heroes solve puzzles, fight Count Olaf's theater troupe, and collect puzzle pieces with the familiar eye throughout the series. If the player collects 25 of each color puzzle piece, a place is revealed in their secret folder, which in turn reveals a picture where they can find a V.F.D. package. This package reveals a special extra in the game, such as a making of featurette. Completing the game will also unlock the World Map, a sandbox mode allowing players to roam around the various levels and collect more puzzle pieces and packages.

=== Game Boy Advance version ===
The Game Boy Advance (GBA) version is different in that players can switch between all three Baudelaires at all times. The game also features more places, such as Briny Beach. It is said to be more difficult than the console versions. In The Reptile Room level, some reptiles are mentioned that never appear in the books. Also, there are fewer inventions but have the same effects as the other games, such as the Parasol Glider, which helps Sunny glide from platform to platform; the Water Pump, which helps Klaus spray and absorb water; the Grappling Hook, which helps Klaus swing from platform to platform; and the Apple Cobbler, which helps Violet shoot apples. Players must collect objects that Violet or Klaus mentions to make the inventions. Players must also talk to other characters to complete some quests or grab items that other characters are holding.

The player must collect pictures and butterflies for invention upgrades, movie scenes, and concept art. They must also collect book pages to use on specific places to either give you extras, keep going on the story, or makes it easier to get around.

=== Windows version ===
The Microsoft Windows version has several differences from the console games. For one, players cannot switch between characters. The game keeps the player as one character, switching to another when necessary, and even separates the older Baudelaire siblings at times. Secondly, there are two new environments, Briny Beach and a horseradish factory (presumably the one that is discussed in The Reptile Room, The Grim Grotto, Lemony Snicket: The Unauthorized Autobiography and The End). Finally, players have different inventions to make; the Smasher, the Lobber (which uses rotten eggs, bubble gum, horseradish, water balloons, and bananas as ammo), the Lockpick, the Sprayer (which uses eau du toilette, onions, pillow feathers, bees, and limes as ammo), the Lever Yanker, the Reptile Retriever, stilts, and a Grappling Hook. As a bonus, players can collect eyes; every ten eyes collected gives the player a poster for an Olaf theater production, and letters from the alphabet which start a word that is then defined. Some of the words are from the books, such as Quagmire, referring to the Quagmire triplets, and Xenophobe, referring to a word Jerome Squalor mentioned to the Baudelaires in The Ersatz Elevator.

== Premise ==
Following key plot points from the film, the video game uses its major plot ponies to set up action and exploration segments. Rather than stages, it is broken up into six consecutive hub areas where the player follows a linear set of objectives to progress. The gameplay finds the player using Klaus and Violet's abilities to solve environmental puzzles, scouring locations for invention parts, platforming, and defeating various enemies and bosses. The game also contains mini-stages where the player controls Sunny in 2.5D platforming segments. The final stage has the player (Klaus) using burning glass to burn Count Olaf and Violet's marriage certificate.

== Development ==
The teaser trailer for the console version, released five months before the game's official release, featured drastic differences in appearance from the final game, bearing stronger resemblance to what would become the game's PC version.

== Reception ==
Reception

Aggregate scores
Aggregator	Score
GameRankings	(GC) 69.64% (GBA) 69.55% (Xbox) 68.20% (PC) 67.20% (PS2) 66.17%
Metacritic	(GBA) 72/100 (GC) 70/100 (Xbox) 67/100 (PC) 64/100 (PS2) 63/100

Review scores
Publication	Score
Game Informer	6.25/10
GameZone	(PS2) 8.5/10; 8/10 (GC) 6.9/10 (PC) 6.5/10
IGN	7.1/10 (PC) 6.5/10
Nintendo Power	(GC) 3.6/5 (GBA) 3.3/5
Official U.S. PlayStation Magazine	2/5
Official Xbox Magazine (US)	7/10
PC Gamer (UK)	58%
X-Play	3/5
Detroit Free Press	2/4
The Sydney Morning Herald	2.5/5

The game has received average to mixed reviews upon release. GameRankings and Metacritic gave it a score of 70% and 72 out of 100 for the Game Boy Advance version; 70% and 70 out of 100 for the GameCube version; 67% and 64 out of 100 for the PC version; 66% and 63 out of 100 for the PlayStation 2 version; and 68% and 67 out of 100 for the Xbox version. Some reviewers gave the game lower scores, citing the short span of the game, lack of replay value, easy difficulty and repetitive gameplay.

The Sydney Morning Herald gave the game two-and-a-half stars out of five. They wrote that its difficulty level is suitable for younger players, but they were critical to its "unwieldy" controls and the short length. Detroit Free Press gave it two stars out of four and wrote that they played the entire game, without any cheats, in about four hours, alluding to its short length.
