= Lump of coal =

Lump of coal may refer to:

- a literal lump of coal
- a traditional warning to children, who are threatened that if they misbehave they will be gifted only a lump of coal instead of nicer presents at Christmas
- A Lump of Coal, a 1991 Australian compilation album of Christmas music
- "The Lump of Coal", a Christmas short story by Lemony Snicket
- "Joel the Lump of Coal", a 2014 song by The Killers
