= The Lump of Coal =

Short story by Daniel Handler

- Author: Daniel Handler (as Lemony Snicket)
- Illustrator: Brett Helquist
- Cover artist: Brett Helquist
- Language: English
- Genre: Humor
- Publisher: HarperCollins
- Publication date: December 12, 2004 (USA Weekend); September 30, 2008 (stand-alone)
- Publication place: United States
- Media type: print

"The Lump of Coal" is a Christmas short story written by Lemony Snicket and illustrated by Brett Helquist. Originally published in the December 10–12, 2004, issue of the now-defunct magazine USA Weekend, it was re-released as a stand-alone book in 2008. It is meant to parody traditional children's Christmas stories, à la the 1823 poem 'Twas the Night Before Christmas. Though illustrated and relatively short, the book uses vocabulary above that of most children, including the term objets d'art. Many elements of the story are easily recognizable as Snicket-esque to A Series of Unfortunate Events readers, including a culturally intelligent and talented protagonist who is dismissed by many a mumpsimus.

== Plot summary ==
It is Christmas time. A living lump of coal falls off a barbecue grill. He wishes for a miracle to happen. The lump of coal is artistic and wants to be an artist. He goes in search of something. First, he finds an art gallery that, he believes, shows art by lumps of coal. But when he comes in, he sadly discovers the art is by humans who use lumps of coal. He then finds a Korean restaurant called Mr. Wong's Korean Restaurant and Secretarial School, but he goes in and discovers that all things used must be 100% Korean (although the owner does not use a Korean name or proper Korean spices). The lump of coal continues down the street and runs into a man dressed like Santa Claus. The lump of coal tells the man about his problem, and the man gets an idea. He suggests he put the lump of coal in Jasper (his bratty son)'s stocking. The son finds it and is ecstatic; he has wanted to make art with coal. So he makes portraits and he and the lump of coal become rich. They move to Korea and open an authentic Korean restaurant, and have a gallery of their art.

== See also ==
- Lemony Snicket bibliography
