= A Series of Unfortunate Events =

Book series by Lemony Snicket

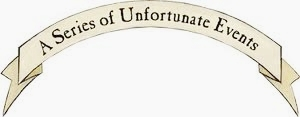
- The logo for the series, which appears on the book covers
- The Bad Beginning (1999); The Reptile Room (1999); The Wide Window (2000); The Miserable Mill (2000); The Austere Academy (2000); The Ersatz Elevator (2001); The Vile Village (2001); The Hostile Hospital (2001); The Carnivorous Carnival (2002); The Slippery Slope (2003); The Grim Grotto (2004); The Penultimate Peril (2005); The End (2006)
- Author: Lemony Snicket
- Illustrator: Brett Helquist
- Cover artist: Brett Helquist
- Country: United States
- Language: English
- Genre: Gothic fiction, absurdist fiction, mystery, comedy drama, black comedy, spy fiction, children's fiction
- Publisher: HarperCollins
- Published: September 30, 1999 – October 13, 2006

A Series of Unfortunate Events is a series of thirteen children's novels written by American author Daniel Handler under the pen name Lemony Snicket. The books follow the turbulent lives of orphaned siblings Violet, Klaus, and Sunny Baudelaire. After their parents' death in a fire, the children are placed under the care of a murderous villain, Count Olaf, who tries to steal their inheritance and causes numerous disasters with the help of his accomplices as the children attempt to flee. Count Olaf pursues the children and their money throughout the books, wearing a different disguise each time. As the plot progresses, the Baudelaires gradually confront further mysteries surrounding their family and deep conspiracies involving a secret society, which also involves Olaf and Lemony Snicket, the author's own fictional self-insert.

Characterized by Victorian Gothic tones and absurdist textuality, the books are noted for their dark humor, sarcastic storytelling, and anachronistic elements, as well as frequent cultural and literary allusions. They have been classified as postmodern and metafictional writing, with the plot evolution throughout the later novels being cited as an exploration of the psychological process of the transition from the innocence of childhood to the moral complexity of maturity. As the series progresses, the Baudelaires must face the reality that their actions have become morally ambiguous, blurring the lines between which characters should be read as "good" or "evil".

Since the release of the first novel, The Bad Beginning, in September 1999, the books have gained significant popularity, critical acclaim, and commercial success worldwide, spawning a film, a video game, assorted merchandise, and a television series. The main thirteen books in the series have collectively sold more than 60 million copies and have been translated into 41 languages. Several companion books set in the same universe of the series have also been released, including Lemony Snicket: The Unauthorized Autobiography, The Beatrice Letters, and the noir prequel tetralogy All the Wrong Questions, which chronicles Snicket's childhood.

== Background ==
Prior to the publication of A Series of Unfortunate Events, Handler had never written for children. According to an interview with Handler, he was encouraged to try writing children's books by his friend and editor, Susan Rich. In a separate author interview, Daphne Merkin wrote that Handler adapted a manuscript for a "mock-gothic" book originally intended for adults into a series more suited for children. Handler invented the pseudonym "Lemony Snicket" as an inside joke among friends years before the publication of A Series of Unfortunate Events.

Handler acknowledges Edward Gorey and Roald Dahl as influences for his writing style in the series. The first book in the series, The Bad Beginning, was released on September 30, 1999.

== Series overview ==
=== Plot summary ===
The series follows the adventures of three orphaned siblings. Violet, Klaus and Sunny Baudelaire find out that their parents have been killed in a fire that destroyed their home. They are then sent to live with a legal guardian named Count Olaf, who is the primary antagonist of the series. Count Olaf desires the Baudelaire fortune, which Violet will inherit when she reaches the age of eighteen. The children reveal Count Olaf's plan, which allows them to be moved out of his care. However, Count Olaf escapes and for the remainder of the series continues to injure or even kill the Baudelaires' guardians, forcing the children to keep moving.

In books two through seven, Count Olaf disguises himself, which the Baudelaires instantly see through but most of the adults do not, only to reveal his identity by unmasking a tattoo of an eye on his ankle. In the seventh book, The Vile Village, Count Olaf fakes his death by killing Lemony's brother Jacques - who has the same ankle tattoo - and framing the Baudelaires for the murder, forcing the orphans to adopt disguises of their own in the eight through twelfth books and become increasingly involved with V.F.D., a volunteer fire department secret organization that went through a schism, creating the two sides of "volunteers" and "villains". As the story continues, it is revealed that the Baudelaire parents, the Snickets, Count Olaf and many of the Baudelaire guardians all have ties to V.F.D.

In The Penultimate Peril, the Baudelaire children are sent to the Hotel Denouement for a V.F.D. meeting. Ultimately, Hotel Denouement is deemed unsafe and the children are forced to flee with Count Olaf after setting fire to the hotel, signaling the cancellation of the meeting. The children and Count Olaf then end up on an inhabited island. They are soon joined by Kit Snicket, Lemony's sister and a friend of their parents, who is in labour and is soon to give birth. After a conflict between Count Olaf and the islanders, he is fatally wounded and accidentally releases the deadly fungus Medusoid mycelium. Although the children discover a cure, they are unable to convince the islanders to consume it. The islanders leave the island in search of an alternative cure, and Count Olaf brings Kit to shore as he succumbs to his wounds. Kit is unable to take the cure due to the effects it has on her baby, and in her dying breath asks the Baudelaires to name the baby after their mother Beatrice. The series ends with an epilogue taking place one year later with the Baudelaire children and the baby Beatrice sailing back into the mainland.

=== Setting ===
The setting of the world has been compared to Edward Scissorhands in that it is suburban gothic. The books seem to be set in an alternate, "timeless" world stylistically resembling both the 19th century and the 1930s, though with later, and seemingly anachronistic scientific knowledge. For instance, in The Hostile Hospital, the Baudelaire children send a message via Morse code on a telegraph, yet the general store they are in has fiber-optic cable for sale. An "advanced computer" appears in The Austere Academy.

Glendon College scholar Danielle Russell argues that the settings reflect familiar places, but are "bizarre" enough that young readers feel distanced from the world of the Baudelaires. While the film version sets the Baudelaire mansion in the city of Boston, Massachusetts, real places rarely appear in the books, though some are mentioned. For example, in The Ersatz Elevator, a book in Jerome and Esmé Squalor's library was titled Trout, in France They're Out. There are also references to fictional North American titles: the Duchess of Winnipeg and the King of Arizona.

=== Characters ===
The protagonists of A Series of Unfortunate Events are the Baudelaire children: Violet, Klaus and Sunny. They are generally well-behaved and attentive, contrasting with the adults around them. Violet is fourteen at the beginning of the series and has an inventive mind; Klaus is twelve at the beginning and an enthusiastic reader with a photographic memory. Sunny Baudelaire is an infant at the beginning who gradually discovers an interest in cooking. The Baudelaire children frequently use their skills and talents to escape Count Olaf's clutches.

Count Olaf is the antagonist of the series. He is a member of V.F.D., the secret organization to which the Baudelaire parents, and many other characters in the series, also belong. His primary goal for the majority of the series is to gain the Baudelaire fortune, a large sum of money that the Baudelaires will inherit when Violet comes of age. Count Olaf is easily identified due to his unibrow and tattoo of the V.F.D. eye on his left ankle, although many of his schemes involve following the Baudelaires in disguise to hide these features. These disguises rarely work against the Baudelaire children but do frequently fool the adults around them.

Lemony Snicket is little involved in the events of the series, but he plays an important role as the narrator. Gradually, it becomes clear that Snicket has ties to V.F.D., the secret organization to which many of the characters belong, including Count Olaf and the Baudelaire parents. It is implied that Snicket has a more personal connection to the Baudelaires. This is confirmed in The End when it is revealed that Beatrice, the woman who Snicket loved and dedicated all the books to, is the Baudelaires' mother.

Various other characters appear in the series. An important recurring character is Arthur Poe, the banker in charge of the Baudelaire affairs. His primary tasks are safeguarding the Baudelaire fortune until it can be handed over to Violet and finding appropriate guardians for the Baudelaire children while they are underage. Count Olaf's henchmen also make frequent appearances in the series, often appearing in disguises alongside him in his schemes. For the most part, they are unnamed but given descriptive titles such as 'The Hook-Handed Man', 'The Bald Man with the Long Nose', etc. Most characters are rather eccentric and play a key role in establishing the series' absurdist tones. Many of the characters are allusions to other famous literary texts.

When asked in a Moment Magazine interview about the Baudelaire children and Snicket's own Jewish heritage, he replied, "Oh yeah! Yes. The Baudelaires are Jewish! I guess we would not know for sure, but we would strongly suspect it, not only from their manner but from the occasional mention of a rabbi or bar mitzvah or synagogue. The careful reader will find quite a few rabbis."

== Literary analysis and themes ==
The series is generally classified under children's literature. More precisely, various writers would further classify the series as gothic fiction, mock-gothic, satire of gothic literature, neo-Victorian or suburban gothic. In addition, the series has been described as absurdist fiction because of its strange characters, improbable storylines and black comedy. Readers debate over the presence and role of realism in the series.

The books can be categorized as mystery novels. According to Chris McGee, the Baudelaires spend the series trying to uncover the truth about their parents' deaths. He also likens the series to noir fiction. Danielle Russell argues that mysteries are solved for the reader by their end. So, the lack of clear answers in The End does not align with this genre.

Allusions to other literary works and events are a common occurrence in the book. The Baudelaire name itself is inspired by Charles Baudelaire, best known for writing Les Fleurs du mal. The children's names are believed to be inspired by Violet Sharpe, from the Lindbergh kidnapping, and Claus von Bülow, who was accused of attempting to murder his wife, Sunny von Bülow. Other character names are also used to allude to Monty Python, Edgar Allan Poe, George Orwell, Virginia Woolf, amongst many more.

Morality plays a central role in the series. Tison Pugh writes "The question developing throughout A Series of Unfortunate Events is whether the Baudelaires embody heroic and morally superior values or whether they are equally villainous to Olaf and his gang". The series begins by portraying the Baudelaires and the volunteers at V.F.D. as good, noble characters while Count Olaf and his troupe are unambiguously evil. As the series develops, moral ambiguity is introduced. For example, at the end of The Penultimate Peril, the Baudelaire children burn down the Hotel Denouement whereas, in The End, Count Olaf uses the last of his strength before dying to pull a pregnant, labouring Kit Snicket to safety.

Another key theme in the series is adultism, the notion that the adult/child dichotomy is a social construct within which the child is the oppressed class. It argues that society is constructed to heavily favor adults, frequently leading to children being neglected and ignored. In the series, the Baudelaire children are constantly dismissed by the adults around them, their concerns ignored, with their age and ensuing naivety being cited. Children are frequently the most reliable and helpful characters that the Baudelaires meet. Handler also uses the children to reflect humanist ideals, which encourage the individual to question knowledge and authority instead of blindly accepting them.

== Style ==
=== Narration style ===
The series is narrated by Lemony Snicket, the pseudonym of Daniel Handler. He dedicates each of his works to his deceased love interest, Beatrice, and often attempts to dissuade the reader from reading the Baudelaires' unfortunate story. Handler has referred to Lemony Snicket as a "character" who also doubles as the series' narrator. Some details of his life are explained somewhat in a supplement to the series, Lemony Snicket: The Unauthorized Autobiography.

When Snicket describes a potentially unfamiliar word, he typically follows it with the saying "a word which here means . . . ." He sometimes follows this phrase with a humorous definition, or one that is relevant only to the events at hand (for example, he describes "adversity" as meaning "Count Olaf").

Lemony Snicket continuously maintains that the story is true and that it is his "solemn duty" to record it. Snicket often goes off into humorous or satirical asides, discussing his opinions or personal life.

Lemony Snicket's narration and commentary are characteristically cynical and despondent. In the blurb for each book, Snicket warns of the misery the reader may experience in reading about the Baudelaire orphans and suggests abandoning the books altogether. However, he also provides ample comic relief with wry, dark humor. Snicket's narration has been described as "self-conscious" and "post-modern". Daphne Merkin characterizes Snicket's narration style as "droll and detached."

When describing a character whom the Baudelaires have met before, Snicket often describes the character first and does not reveal the name of the character until they have been thoroughly described. Lemony Snicket starts each book with a "post-modern dissection of the reading experience" before linking it back to how he presents the story of the Baudelaires and what their current situation is. Snicket often uses alliteration to name locations, as well as book titles, throughout the story. Many of the books start with a theme being introduced that is continually referenced throughout the book—such as the repeated comparisons of the words "nervous" and "anxious" in The Ersatz Elevator, the consistent use of the phrase "where there's smoke, there's fire" in The Slippery Slope, and the descriptions of the water cycle in The Grim Grotto.

=== Repetition ===
The plots of the first seven books follow the same basic pattern: the Baudelaires go to a new guardian in a new location, where Count Olaf appears and attempts to steal their fortune; although the guardian is killed off, Olaf's schemes are foiled. Then, the story changes later in the series with Count Olaf trying to kill the other Baudelaires to make it easier to get the fortune. The books following pick up where the previous book ended. There are thirteen books in the series and each book has thirteen chapters. The last book in the series, The End, contains two stories: The End, which has 13 chapters, and a separate "book" that is titled Chapter Fourteen. The location of each book's events is usually identified in the book's title; the first twelve book titles are generally alliterative.

=== Secrets in the series ===

After the fourth book, Barbara Kaczyńska argues that secrets play a more important role in the story. In the final book, The End, the concept is especially important, as demonstrated by a several-page-long discussion of the phrase "in the dark." The children hear of a massive schism within the organization of V.F.D., which was once noble but became filled with corruption and split into two sides, "volunteers" and "villains." While many of the critical plot points are given answers, Snicket explains that no story can be fully devoid of questions as every story is intertwined with numerous others and every character's history is shared in a great web of mysteries and unfortunate events that make up the world's legacy, making it impossible for anyone to know all the answers to every question. The Baudelaire children and Count Olaf's story is said to be merely a fragment of a much bigger story between numerous characters with the central connection being the organization of V.F.D.

=== Clues ===
There is a full-page picture at the end of each book, showing a hint or clue about the content of the next book. This may depict a flyer or piece of paper, or it may show a significant object: a snake appears at the end of The Bad Beginning, referring to Montgomery's snake collection in the following book. The same picture is used at the start of the succeeding book. This practice continued at the end of The End which shows a boat sailing off into the sunset and at the start of Chapter Fourteen. The picture at the end of Chapter Fourteen includes a shape of a question mark.

Following the picture is a letter to the editor, which explains to the editor how to get the manuscript of the next book. Snicket is writing from the location of the next book and usually reveals its title. Snicket notes that the editors will find various objects along with the manuscript, all of them having some impact in the story. Starting with the fourth book (which previews the fifth), each letter has a layout relating to the next book, such as torn edges, fancy stationery, sopping wet paper, or telegram format. The letters change dramatically starting with the letter at the end of The Hostile Hospital—for this preview letter, the letter is ripped to shreds and only a few scraps remain. The remaining letters are difficult to read, and some do not reveal the title. The final letter appears at the end of The End and simply has "The end of THE END can be found at the end of THE END." There is no letter after Chapter Fourteen.

Each book begins with a dedication to a woman named Beatrice, and references to her are made by Snicket throughout the series, describing her as the woman he still loves while emphasizing the fact that she apparently died long ago. At the end of the Chapter Fourteen epilogue, it is revealed that Beatrice was the Baudelaires' late mother, who married their father after an unknown event caused her to return Snicket's engagement ring, alongside a two-hundred-page book explaining all the reasons she could not marry him.

== Distribution ==
=== Books ===
The series comprises the following thirteen novels:

1. The Bad Beginning (1999)
2. The Reptile Room (1999)
3. The Wide Window (2000)
4. The Miserable Mill (2000)
5. The Austere Academy (2000)
6. The Ersatz Elevator (2001)
7. The Vile Village (2001)
8. The Hostile Hospital (2001)
9. The Carnivorous Carnival (2002)
10. The Slippery Slope (2003)
11. The Grim Grotto (2004)
12. The Penultimate Peril (2005)
13. The End (2006)

=== Appearance ===
In an article about children's literature, Bruce Butt describes the hardcover books as "elegant" and "collectible." He notes that the endpapers and overall book design resemble Victorian-era novels. Danielle Russell argues that the visual stylization of the books adds to their sense of timelessness. The hardcover books were printed with a deckle edge.

There was an initial paperback release of the series, featuring restyled covers, new illustrations, and a serial supplement entitled The Cornucopian Cavalcade with The Bad Beginning: or, Orphans!, The Reptile Room: or, Murder!, and The Wide Window: or, Disappearance!. However, the release was stopped after the third.

=== Accompanying books ===
There are books that accompany the series, such as The Beatrice Letters, Lemony Snicket: The Unauthorized Autobiography, and The Puzzling Puzzles; journals The Blank Book and The Notorious Notations; and short materials such as The Dismal Dinner and 13 Shocking Secrets You'll Wish You Never Knew About Lemony Snicket. Humorous quotes from the series were used in a book published under the Snicket name, Horseradish: Bitter Truths You Can't Avoid.

=== All the Wrong Questions ===
Lemony Snicket's All the Wrong Questions is a four-part young adult series focused on the character Snicket's childhood working for V.F.D. It is set in the same universe as A Series of Unfortunate Events and features several of the same characters and locations. The first book was titled Who Could That Be at This Hour?, and was released in October 2012. The second, When Did You See Her Last?, was released in October 2013, and the third, Shouldn't You Be in School?, was released in September 2014. The final book, Why Is This Night Different from All Other Nights?, was released on September 29, 2015.

== In other media ==
=== Film ===
Lemony Snicket's A Series of Unfortunate Events is a film adaptation of the first three titles in the series, mixing the various events and characters into one story. It was released in the United States on December 17, 2004 by Paramount Pictures and internationally by DreamWorks Pictures. Directed by Brad Silberling, it stars Jim Carrey as Count Olaf, Meryl Streep as Aunt Josephine, Billy Connolly as Uncle Monty, Emily Browning as Violet, Liam Aiken as Klaus, Timothy Spall as Mr. Poe, and Jude Law as the voice of Lemony Snicket. The film was financially successful and received generally positive reviews, but received criticism over its comic tone.

Considering the success of the movie, the director and some of the lead actors hinted that they were keen on making a sequel, but no script was written and it was abandoned.

Browning has said that further films would have to be produced quickly, as the children do not age much throughout the book series.

In 2008, Daniel Handler stated in a Bookslut Interview that another film was in the works, but had been delayed by corporate shake-ups at Paramount Pictures. In June 2009, Silberling confirmed he still talked about the project with Handler, and suggested the sequel be a stop motion film because the lead actors have grown too old. "In an odd way, the best thing you could do is actually have Lemony Snicket say to the audience, 'Okay, we pawned the first film off as a mere dramatization with actors. Now I'm afraid I'm going to have to show you the real thing.'"

=== Television ===
Netflix, in association with Paramount Television, announced in November 2014 its plans to adapt the books into an original TV series with 25 total episodes spanning three seasons, with two episodes dedicated to each book, with the exception of the thirteenth book, The End. Author Daniel Handler was to serve as a writer and executive producer.

On September 4, 2015, it was announced that filmmaker Barry Sonnenfeld and True Blood showrunner Mark Hudis had agreed to helm the series. Hudis would serve as showrunner, Sonnenfeld as director, and both as executive producers with Daniel Handler penning the scripts. On December 3, 2015, an open casting call was announced for the roles of Violet and Klaus Baudelaire, with the casting call confirming that the series would begin production in March 2016.

In January 2016, Netflix announced that Hudis had left the project. However, it was announced that Sonnenfeld and Handler were both still on board, and that Neil Patrick Harris had been cast as Count Olaf and Malina Weissman and Louis Hynes as Violet and Klaus.

In March 2016, K. Todd Freeman and Patrick Warburton were cast as Mr. Poe and Lemony Snicket respectively. The first season, consisting of eight episodes that cover the first four books, was released worldwide on Netflix on January 13, 2017. A Series of Unfortunate Events was renewed for a second season, which was released on March 30, 2018, and consisted of ten episodes that adapt books five through nine of the novel series. The television series was also renewed for a third and final season, which was released on January 1, 2019, consisting of seven episodes that adapted the final four books. The last book, The End, was adapted into one episode instead of the standard two episodes.

=== Video game ===
Lemony Snicket's A Series of Unfortunate Events is a video game based on the 2004 film. It was developed by Adrenium Games and Activision for PlayStation 2, GameCube, Xbox, Game Boy Advance, and PC. The player plays as all three orphans at points in the game, and encounters characters such as Mr. Poe, Uncle Monty and Aunt Josephine, along with villains such as Count Olaf, the Hook-Handed Man, the White-Faced Women, and the Bald Man. The game, like the movie, follows only the first three books in the series.

A separate casual game titled A Series of Unfortunate Events was published by Oberon Media the same year as a different tie-in to the books. Set in Count Olaf's house, the game involves his six associates and many objects they use in Olaf's efforts to capture the children. Gameplay includes three difficulty levels and two game modes: Deduction Junction and Swap Monster.

=== Board games ===
A board game based on the books was distributed by Mattel in 2004, prior to the movie. The Perilous Parlor Game is for 2–4 players, ages 8 and up. One player assumes the role of Count Olaf, and the other players play the Baudelaire children. Count Olaf's objective in the game is to eliminate the guardian, while the children try to keep the guardian alive. The game employs Clever Cards, Tragedy Cards, Secret Passage Tiles, and Disguise Tiles in play.

=== Card games ===
The Catastrophic Card Game is the second game based on the books. In this card game, players are looking to complete sets of characters. There are 4 different sets: The Baudelaire Orphans, Count Olaf in Disguise, Olaf's Henchmen, and the Orphans' Confidants. Players take turns drawing a card from either the draw pile or the top card from the discard pile in hopes of completing their sets. For 2–4 players, ages 14 and under.

=== Audio ===
==== Audio books ====
Most of the series of unabridged audiobooks are read by British actor Tim Curry, though Handler as Lemony Snicket reads books 3 to 5. Of narrating the audiobooks, Handler has said: "It was very, very hard. It was unbelievably arduous. It was the worst kind of arduous." In consequence, future narrating duties were handed back to Curry, of whom Handler states: "he does a splendid job". The "Dear Reader" blurb is usually read by Handler (as Snicket) at the beginning, although it is missing in The Hostile Hospital. Handler usually reads the "To my Kind Editor" blurb about the next book at the end. Starting at The Carnivorous Carnival, there is another actor who replaces Handler in reading the two blurbs, although they are skipped entirely in The Grim Grotto. All of the recordings include a loosely related song by The Gothic Archies, a novelty band of which Handler is a member, featuring lyrics by Handler's Magnetic Fields bandmate Stephin Merritt.

==== Album ====
In October 2006, The Tragic Treasury: Songs from A Series of Unfortunate Events by The Gothic Archies was released. The album is a collection of thirteen songs written and performed by Stephin Merritt (of The Magnetic Fields), each one originally appearing on one of the corresponding thirteen audiobooks of the series. Two bonus songs are included.

== Reception ==
=== Reviews ===
Reviews for A Series of Unfortunate Events have generally been positive, with reviewers saying that the series is enjoyable for children and adults alike, and that it brings fresh and adult themes to children's stories. The Times Online refer to the books as "a literary phenomenon", and discuss how the plight of the Baudelaire orphans helps children cope with loss—citing the rise in sales post-September 11, 2001 as evidence. Mackey attributes the series' success to the "topsy-turvy moral universe." Langbauer feels that the series "offers a critique of the pieties" of earlier generations and imparts "its own vision of ethics." In a May 2000 article for Publishers Weekly, Sally Lodge notes kids' and educators' enthusiasm for the first four books in the series.

=== Criticism ===
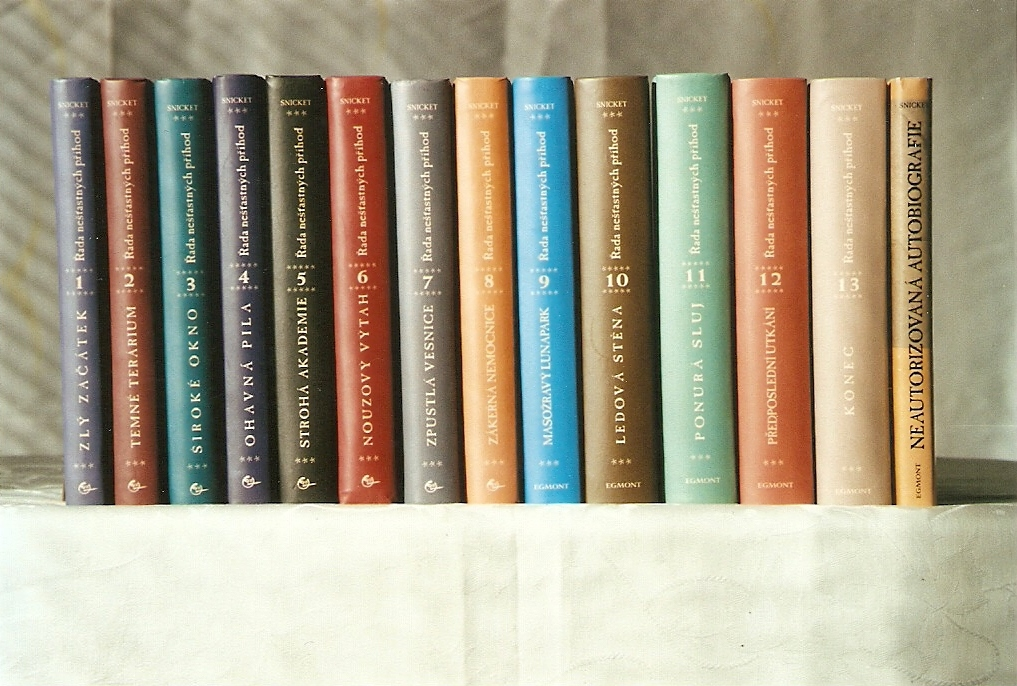
Czech translation

Access to the books was restricted at Katy ISD Elementary School in Katy, Texas. A school in Decatur, Georgia criticized The Reptile Room for its inclusion of the word "damn", canceling an author event with Handler in protest.

Criticisms include the suggested incest in Olaf's attempt to marry his distant cousin Violet in The Bad Beginning. The series has also been criticized for formulaic and repetitive storytelling, including by Bruce Butt, who likened the first eight books to "junk food" for children.

=== Sales ===
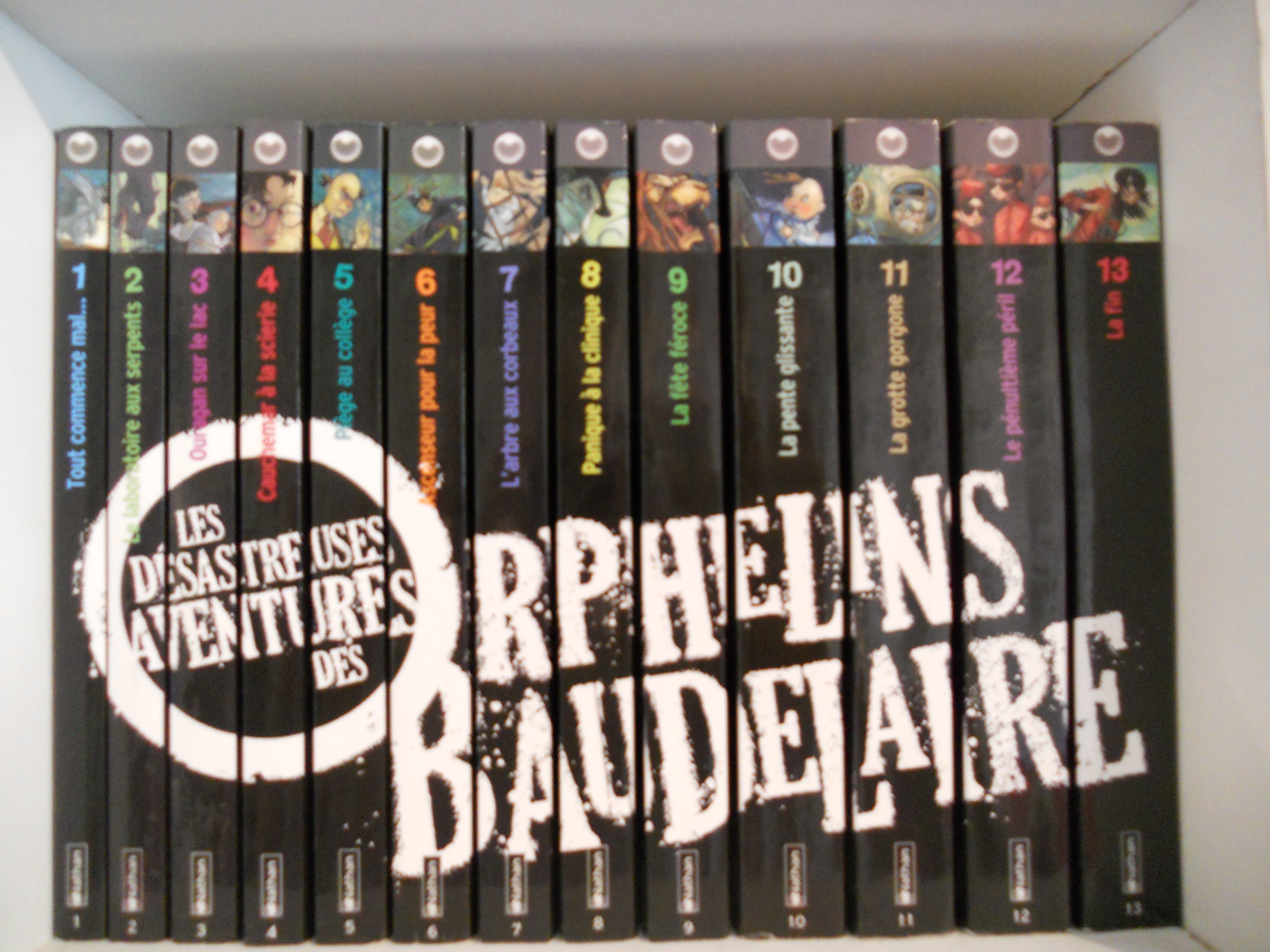
French translations

Within a year of The Bad Beginning's publication, the first four books in the series had a combined printing of 125,000 copies. A Series of Unfortunate Events has been printed in 41 different languages, selling at least sixty-five million copies as of 2015.

=== Awards ===
The Bad Beginning won multiple literary awards, including the Colorado Children's Book Award, the Nevada Young Readers Award and the Nene Award. It was also a finalist for the Book Sense Book of the Year.

Its sequels have continued this trend, garnering multiple awards and nominations. Among these are three IRA/CBC Children's Choice Awards, which it received for The Wide Window, The Vile Village, and The Hostile Hospital. The Penultimate Peril won a best book prize at the Nickelodeon Kids' Choice Awards, and a 2006 Quill Book Award.

=== Book lists ===
While not technically awards, The Ersatz Elevator was named a Book Sense 76 Pick, and The Grim Grotto is an Amazon.com Customers' Favorite.

== See also ==
- Lemony Snicket bibliography
- Charles Baudelaire – French poet
- List of A Series of Unfortunate Events characters

== Bibliography ==
- Snicket, Lemony (2006). A Series of Unfortunate Events, Books 1-13. Harper Collins. ISBN 978-0061119064.
