= The Penultimate Peril =

2005 children's novel

- Front cover of U.S. edition
- Author: Lemony Snicket (pen name of Daniel Handler)
- Illustrator: Brett Helquist
- Cover artist: Brett Helquist
- Language: English
- Series: A Series of Unfortunate Events
- Genre: Gothic fiction Absurdist fiction Mystery
- Publisher: HarperCollins
- Publication date: October 18, 2005
- Publication place: United States
- Media type: Print (hardback & paperback)
- Pages: 353
- ISBN: 0-06-441015-3
- Preceded by: The Grim Grotto
- Followed by: The End

Book the Twelfth: The Penultimate Peril is the twelfth novel in the children's novel series A Series of Unfortunate Events by Lemony Snicket.

== Plot ==
The Baudelaire orphans, Violet, Klaus and Sunny are travelling with pregnant V.F.D. member Kit Snicket to Hotel Denouement, the last safe place for the noble side of V.F.D to gather. She tells them that, prior to V.F.D.’s gathering in two days, they will be disguised as concierges to observe the mysterious 'J.S.,’ in order to identify them as a volunteer or a villain of V.F.D. The hotel's managers are identical twins Frank and Ernest—Frank is a volunteer, but Ernest is on the opposing side as a villain.

During their first day of disguised employment, the Baudelaires split up to assist the hotel's guests—Violet assists Esmé Squalor and Carmelita Spats by bringing them a harpoon gun with the help of a manager, Klaus assists Charles and Sir (the owners of the Lucky Smells Lumbermill) by escorting them to the sauna while also hanging "birdpaper" outside a window for one of the managers, and Sunny assists Hal (an employee at Heimlich Hospital) and another manager in locking a V.F.D device onto a door of the laundry room, converting it into a Vernacularly Fastened Door, while meeting with Vice-Principal Nero, Ms. Bass and Mr. Remora (faculty from Prufrock Preparatory School)—all the guests discuss the mysterious J.S. It was later revealed that Hugo, Collette, and Kevin (the "freaks" from Caligari Carnival) spied on them during these events.

Together the siblings discuss which manager asked for what, as each of them ran into a separate manager. Remembering a favorite poem of their father’s, Klaus concludes that Carmelita Spats requested the harpoon gun to shoot down a bird carrying the sugar bowl, as Sunny mentioned that Hal and a manager were discussing the sugar bowl (an object both volunteers and villains are seeking for unknown reasons) and the Medusoid Mycelium (a deadly fungus parasite they encounter in the previous book)—the bird's body would then land on the paper, and the sugar bowl would fall into a chute leading the laundry room, which is where the Vernacularly Fastened Door led to.

Shortly after his proposal, one of the managers encounters them and reveals himself as Dewey Denouement, the third of the secretly three brothers and the one who helped Sunny (Frank helped Violet and Ernest helped Klaus). He has created a book cataloging all information of the V.F.D. and tells them that a pool reflection of the hotel is the actual safe place, as the hotel's words and structure were designed backward to reflect the actual words onto the pool—beneath the pool is an underwater catalog containing crucial information concerning V.F.D. They are then encountered by Jerome Squalor and Justice Strauss, who have joined V.F.D. after believing messages being sent to J.S. were being addressed to them.

While the four re-enter the hotel, Count Olaf intercepts them, and threatens Dewey with a harpoon gun for the code needed to access the door. While the children attempt to prevent the killing, Mr. Poe suddenly enters, causing Olaf to shove the weapon into the Baudelaires' hands—surprised, they drop the gun, causing it to discharge and kill Dewey. As a crowd arrives, a man in a taxi implied to be Lemony Snicket offers to take the Baudelaires away, but they decline. The next morning, the orphans and Olaf are sent to court; however, everyone except for the judges must be blindfolded for it to be legal. The audience was also almost everyone the orphans met since their parents died including Mr. Lesko and Mrs. Morrow (two villagers from the Village of Fowl Devotees), as well as Daily Punctilio reporter, Geraldine Julienne. However, the other two judges are actually the Man with a Beard But No Hair and the Woman With Hair But No Beard, who are the villans of V.F.D. During the hearing, the Baudelaires realize that it was a trick for Olaf to kidnap Justice Strauss, pursue the sugar bowl, and burn the hotel and its inhabitants. Klaus, realizing that the chute the sugar bowl fell into actually led to underneath the pool, reveals the door code to Olaf, as the lock was just a diversion. Violet gains access to a boat for all of them to escape the authorities and so Olaf won't unleash the Medusoid Mycelium, while Sunny assists in burning the hotel as a signal to V.F.D. that the gathering has been canceled due to the invasion of enemies. The Baudelaires, along with Justice Strauss, attempt to alert everyone about the fire; it is unknown who managed to escape and who did not. Shortly after the authorities arrive, the orphans, along with Olaf, are about to disembark by sea. When Justice Strauss attempts to intervene, Sunny apologetically bites her hand, and the four sail away from the area, and out to sea.

== Foreshadowing ==
In the last picture of The Penultimate Peril, Count Olaf and the Baudelaire children sail away from the smoking shore aboard a large ship. Unlike the other novels, there are no hints or foreshadowing to the next book.

== Translations ==
- Dutch: "Het voorlaatste gevaar" (The Penultimate Peril)
- Finnish: "Ratkaisun rajoilla" (At the Borders of Solution), WSOY, 2006, ISBN 951-0-32089-7
- French: "Le Pénultième Péril" (The Penultimate Peril)
- German: ”Das haarsträubende Hotel” (The Outlandish Hotel)
- Japanese: "終わりから二番目の危機" (The Second-to-Last Crisis), Soshisha, 2007, ISBN 978-4-7942-1623-6
- Norwegian: ”Den tolvte trussel” (The Twelfth Threat), Tor Edvin Dahl, Cappelen Damm, 2006, ISBN 9788202259754
- Persian: “خطر ما قبل اخر" (The Penultimate Risk)
- Polish: ”Przedostatnia pułapka” (The Penultimate Trap)
- Russian: "Предпоследняя передряга" (Penultimate Scrape), Azbuka, 2007, ISBN 5-352-02021-5
- Thai: "หายนะก่อนปิดฉาก", Nanmeebooks Teen, 2006, ISBN 9789749908778

== Adaptation ==
The book was adapted into the fifth and sixth episodes of the third season of the television series adaptation produced by Netflix. In this version, many characters are absent including the Prufrock teachers, V.F.D. villagers, Caligari freaks (in this case because they were killed off in an earlier epiosde), and Hal. Phil was going appear but his actor, Rhys Darby, couldn't make it to filming due to being stuck in Fiji due to a typhoon. As a result, Kerri Kenney-Silver reprised her role as Babs.
