= Horseradish: Bitter Truths You Can't Avoid =

Book by Lemony Snicket

- 1st ed., HC DJ
- Author: Lemony Snicket
- Cover artist: Mark Tucker/Merge Left Reps., Inc.
- Language: English
- Genre: Fiction
- Publisher: HarperCollins
- Publication date: April 24, 2007 (United States); September 3, 2007 (United Kingdom)
- Publication place: United States
- Media type: Print (Paperback, hardback)
- Pages: 168 pp
- ISBN: 0-06-124006-0
- OCLC: 123417401
- Dewey Decimal: 818/.54 22
- LC Class: PS3558.A4636 H67 2007

Horseradish: Bitter Truths You Can't Avoid is a 2007 book written by Lemony Snicket. It is a "wit and wisdom" quotation book partly drawn from Snicket's famous A Series of Unfortunate Events book series.

== Contents ==
Following the tradition of Snicket's work, Horseradish has thirteen chapters, each with a certain theme. The book is prefaced with an introduction that outlines these themes.

=== Introduction ===
The bulk of the introduction follows the story of a man and a woman who live in a small grass hut in a village surrounded by a horseradish field. They generally live a routine life, and, as they have no taste for the horseradish, spend most of their time hunting to prepare raisin-stuffed snails to provide for their meals. One night, the wife asks her husband if there is more to life than doing the same thing for years. Her husband replies that the wife's mother once told him about a wise man who would probably know. The wife visits her mother, who says that she heard about the wise man from the wife's third grade teacher, Miss Matmos. Miss Matmos tells the wife that the wise man lives on the top of a mountain far away and that the journey to the top of the mountain is difficult and dull.

After months of walking and thinking about the subjects in the chapter headings, the wife arrives at the house of the wise old man; however, he is in fact not a wise man but a wide man. Tired and hungry, the wife returns home, but learns that in her absence her mother has taken her fishing pole, her husband has married Miss Matmos, and that she failed third grade. The moral of the story is that life has bitter truths that cannot be avoided.

=== Chapters ===
1. Home
2. Family
3. School
4. Work
5. Entertainment
6. Literature
7. Travel
8. Emotional Health
9. Affairs of the Heart
10. A Life of Mystery
11. The Mystery of Life
12. An Overall Feeling of Doom that One Cannot Ever Escape no Matter What One Does
13. Miscellaneous
