= The Ersatz Elevator =

2001 children's novel

- Author: Lemony Snicket (pen name of Daniel Handler)
- Illustrator: Brett Helquist
- Cover artist: Brett Helquist
- Language: English
- Series: A Series of Unfortunate Events
- Genre: Gothic fiction Absurdist fiction Mystery
- Publisher: HarperCollins
- Publication date: March 2001
- Publication place: United States
- Media type: Print (hardback & paperback)
- Pages: 259
- ISBN: 0-06-440864-7 (first edition, hardback)
- OCLC: 44777210
- Dewey Decimal: Fic 21
- LC Class: PZ7.S6795 Er 2001
- Preceded by: The Austere Academy
- Followed by: The Vile Village

Book the Sixth: The Ersatz Elevator is the sixth novel of the children's novel series A Series of Unfortunate Events by Lemony Snicket. The Baudelaires are sent to live with the wealthy Esmé and Jerome Squalor.

== Plot summary ==
Mr. Poe takes the Baudelaire orphans to their new home on 667 Dark Avenue. The street is dark, as light is "out", or unpopular. The elevators in the apartment building are not working, as elevators are "out", leaving the Baudelaires to walk up several dozen flights of stairs to the penthouse where the Squalors live. Jerome Squalor welcomes the children to their new home. He offers them "aqueous martinis", (water garnished with an olive served in a fancy glass), and introduces them to his wife, Esmé Squalor, the city's sixth most important financial adviser, who is concerned about what's "in" and what's "out". Jerome avoids disputes with Esmé, as he hates arguing with her, and follows her instructions. While Jerome, a good friend of the Baudelaires' mother, truly cares for the children, it becomes apparent that Esmé's reason for adopting them is because orphans are "in." Esmé sends the children and Jerome to Café Salmonella for dinner, because she will be busy privately discussing arrangements for an auction with trendy auctioneer Gunther.

After Esmé gives the children over-sized pinstripe suits to wear, the Baudelaires recognize Gunther as Count Olaf, despite his attempt to disguise his unibrow with a monocle and horse riding boots to cover up the tattoo of an eye on his ankle. Despite their protestations, Jerome takes the children to the restaurant. Jerome believes the children are being xenophobic, and dismisses their suspicions of Gunther.

Klaus notices that there is one elevator door on each floor except for the top floor, which has two. The children discover that the extra elevator is "ersatz", fake, and consists of nothing but an empty shaft. They climb down the shaft, to find the two Quagmire triplets trapped in a cage at the bottom of the shaft. The Quagmires say that Count Olaf is planning to smuggle them out of the city by hiding them as an object at the "In" auction, which one of his associates will bid on. The Baudelaires return to the penthouse to find tools with which they can free the Quagmires, but they return to find that Gunther has cast the Quagmires away already. They return, dispirited, to the penthouse.

Klaus finds a Lot #50, V.F.D., in the auction catalog. The Baudelaires believe this is the item the Quagmires will be hidden in, because the Quagmires had told them (at the end of The Austere Academy) that Count Olaf was involved in a secret group called V.F.D. The Baudelaires tell Esmé about this, but it is revealed that Esmé knew who Gunther was, and was actually in on the plan to kidnap the Quagmires. When the Baudelaires show her the ersatz elevator, she pushes them down the empty shaft. They land halfway down in a net.

Sunny climbs up the shaft with her razor-sharp teeth, gets the ersatz rope and jumps back down into the net. Sunny bites a hole in the net, and using the rope, they climb down from the net. Using Violet's ersatz welding torches, they travel along the hallway at the bottom of the shaft, only to find that it leads to a dead end. Pounding on the "ceiling" reveals that it is in fact a trap door; the children escape through it, and find themselves in the ashes of their old home.

They rush to Veblen Hall, the location of the auction, and join the crowd already there. The auction has begun, and Gunther and Esmé are on the stage auctioning off Lot #46. The children ask Jerome to buy them Lot #50. Mr. Poe and Jerome both bid and then back down, but Sunny bids $1,000 on it and wins due to Mr. Poe remembering that she worked at Prufrock Preparatory School. The Baudelaires open the box (without paying), only to reveal Very Fancy Doilies instead of the Quagmires. Gunther slips on the doilies and is revealed as Count Olaf when his boots and monocle fly off, revealing his unibrow and tattoo. Count Olaf and Esmé flee, pursued by the audience. The doorman is revealed as the Hook-Handed Man, and the Quagmires are hidden in the statue of a literal red herring. Although Jerome wants to keep the Baudelaires, he insists on taking them far away so Count Olaf will not bother them. They refuse this, however, because they want to rescue the Quagmires.

The story ends when Jerome is forced to give them up, because he is not brave enough to help them, Mr. Poe is calling a Vietnamese restaurant instead of the police, and the three children are sitting on the steps in front of Veblen Hall.

== Foreshadowing ==
In the last picture of The Ersatz Elevator, a crow is flying overhead, foreshadowing the crow-obsessed village in The Vile Village.

== Cultural and literary allusions ==
- The opening discussion of "nervous" versus "anxious" is reminiscent of The Giver written by Lois Lowry.
- The Café Salmonella is a reference to salmon and to the disease of the same name.
- The Crying of Lot 49 is a novel by Thomas Pynchon in which a set of rare stamps are sold in Lot 49 of an auction.
- Esmé Gigi Geniveve Squalor's name is a reference to J. D. Salinger's story "For Esmé – with Love and Squalor". Esmé's husband Jerome shares his first name with Salinger. Both have the initials "J.S.", which is a recurring acronym in the series.
- "Red herring" is a phrase used when talking about a distraction. The statue of the red herring contained the two surviving Quagmire triplets, although in an example of dramatic irony, the box of Very Fancy Doilies was the true red herring.
- The Verne Invention Museum is a reference to Jules Verne.
- Akhmatova Book Store is a reference to a Russian poet.
- Pincus Hospital, where Sunny was born, is a reference to Gregory Goodwin Pincus, inventor of the contraceptive pill.
- There are 1,849 windows in 667 Dark Avenue. 1849 is the year in which Edgar Allan Poe died.
- 667 Dark Avenue is one number away from 666, a number often associated with evil. Also, there are 66 floors in the building, Esmé is the sixth most important financial advisor and this is the sixth book, three more references to the number 6.
- Veblen Hall, site of the auction of mostly useless goods, alludes to Thorstein Veblen, the economist who coined the phrase "conspicuous consumption".
- When the Baudelaires first climb the stairs to the penthouse, they overhear a woman say "Let them eat cake," a quote often misattributed to Marie Antoinette.
- One of the books in the Squalor library is titled Boots Were In in 1812. This may be a reference to Napoleon's retreat from Moscow in 1812.

== Translations ==
- Brazilian Portuguese: "O Elevador Ersatz", Cia. das Letras, 2001, ISBN 85-359-0320-8
- Finnish: "Haamuhissi" (The Ghost Elevator), WSOY, 2004, ISBN 951-0-28567-6
- French: "Ascenseur pour la Peur" ("Elevator to Horror")
- German: "Die dunkle Allee" ("The Dark Alley")
- Greek: "Το Ψεύτικο Ασανσέρ" ("The False Elevator")
- Italian: "L'Ascensore Ansiogeno" ("The Anxiogenic Elevator")
- Japanese: "まやかしエレベーター" (The Fake Elevator), Soshisha, 2003, ISBN 4-7942-1229-1
- Korean: "아찔한 엘리베이터" (Giddy Lift), Munhakdongnae Publishing Co, Ltd., 2007, ISBN 978-89-546-0850-3
- Norwegian: Den skjulte sjakten (The Secret Shaft), Tor Edvin Dahl, Cappelen Damm, 2002, ISBN 9788202211554
- Polish: "Winda widmo" (The Phantom Elevator) Egmont, 2003, ISBN 83-237-1704-4
- Romanian: "Lift Ersatz"
- Russian: "Липовый лифт", Azbuka, 2004, ISBN 5-352-00952-1
- Spanish: "El Ascensor Artificioso" ("The Artificial Elevator")
- Swedish: "Det Hemliga Hisskaktet" ("The Secret Elevator Shaft")
- Chinese: "仿照電梯"
- Turkish: "Alacakaranlık Bulvarı" ("The Twilight Boulevard")
- Thai: "คฤหาสน์อาเพศ", Nanmeebooks Teen, 2008, ISBN 9789744720375

== Adaptation ==
The book was adapted into the third and fourth episodes of the second season of the television series adaptation produced by Netflix.

== See also ==
- Violet Baudelaire
- Klaus Baudelaire
- Sunny Baudelaire
- Arthur Poe
- Esmé Squalor
- Jerome Squalor
- V.F.D.
