= The Grim Grotto =

2004 children's novel by Lemony Snicket

- Author: Lemony Snicket (pen name of Daniel Handler)
- Illustrator: Brett Helquist
- Cover artist: Brett Helquist
- Language: English
- Series: A Series of Unfortunate Events
- Genre: Gothic fiction Absurdist fiction Mystery
- Publisher: HarperCollins
- Publication date: September 21, 2004
- Publication place: United States
- Media type: Print (hardback & paperback)
- Pages: 323
- ISBN: 0-06-441014-5
- OCLC: 55681958
- Preceded by: The Slippery Slope
- Followed by: The Penultimate Peril

Book the Eleventh: The Grim Grotto is the eleventh novel in the children's book series A Series of Unfortunate Events by Lemony Snicket. The book was released on Tuesday, September 21, 2004. This novel tells the subsequent story of the Baudelaire orphans, who discover the crew of the Queequeg submarine searching for a mysterious sugar bowl in the eponymous grotto.

== Plot ==
Having been separated from Quigley Quagmire by the waterfall of the Mortmain Mountains, the Baudelaire children arrive at the hull of the Queequeg, a submarine piloted by Captain Widdershins. They correctly guess the password, "the world is quiet here", and enter the porthole to meet Widdershins along with his stepdaughter Fiona and the chef Cookie, who they recognise as the optimist Phil who used to work for the Lucky Smells Lumbermill (in The Miserable Mill). Widdershins is a V.F.D. member and knew the Baudelaire parents; he talks with urgency but often gives contradicting instructions. He is traveling to the last safe place, the Hotel Denouement, but must first locate the sugar bowl, though he will not tell them what is inside.

Klaus examines the tidal charts to estimate that the sugar bowl is in the Gorgonian Grotto, but is interrupted by sonar detection of an octopus-shaped submarine that they suspect is captained by Count Olaf. The submarine is chased away by the Great Unknown, which appears on the sonar as a question mark. Fiona, a mycologist, discovers that the Gorgonian Grotto is home to the Medusoid Mycelium, a dangerous fungus which can kill within an hour of inhalation. As the grotto is conical, the Queequeg reaches a point where it is too wide to pass through, and instead the Baudelaire children and Fiona venture further in diving outfits. Reaching a beach, the children search through detritus in vain and are delayed in their return by the waxing and waning of Medusoid Mycelium. Sunny cooks a meal with ingredients on the beach, saving the wasabi for their return, as the others discover instructions for communicating with Verse Fluctuation Declaration, in which a message is hidden in a poem that has some of its words replaced.

On the children's return to the submarine, Widdershins and Phil are absent and Sunny is discovered to have been poisoned by Medusoid Mycelium. Count Olaf mounts the Queequeg and forces the children aboard his ship, the Carmelita. The ship is powered by the labor of kidnapped children such as the Snow Scouts, who are forced to watch Carmelita dance and sing. The Baudelaires and Fiona are taken to the brig. The hook-handed man—Fernald—is responsible for watching them, but the Baudelaires learn that he is Fiona's brother. Fernald is ashamed of his decision to leave Widdershins and join Olaf's troupe many years ago. He will help them return to the Queequeg if he can join them.

The Baudelaires successfully sneak past Carmelita and Esmé, but Fiona and Fernald are caught and forced to stay, under the premise that Fiona has defected to join Olaf. Violet realizes that it is her fifteenth birthday as Klaus discovers that horseradish is an antidote to the Medusoid Mycelium. Sunny calculates that wasabi should be a culinary equivalent and the wasabi from the beach is used to save her. A telegram from Quigley instructs the Baudelaires to meet him on Briny Beach, after using Verse Fluctuation Declaration on an extract of T.S. Eliot's The Waste Land.

Olaf discovers the Baudelaires' escape and rejoins them on the Queequeg. Fiona has defected to his troupe, genuinely this time. As he prepares to flee from the Great Unknown, which reappears on the radar, Fiona permits the Baudelaires to escape and gives Klaus a kiss goodbye. The children reach Briny Beach to find Mr. Poe—just as they did on the day they learned of their parents' death—but they leave him behind to enter a taxi with Kit Snicket at the wheel.

== Foreshadowing ==
In the last picture of The Grim Grotto, Mr. Poe is seen waving to the Baudelaire orphans as they climb into a taxi. On the beach, there is a hat, half-buried in the sand, that reads "Hotel D------." The rest is in sand. This is a reference to the Hotel Denouement, the hotel from The Penultimate Peril.

== Translations ==
- Brazilian Portuguese: "A Gruta Gorgônea", Cia das Letras
- Czech: "Ponurá sluj"
- Finnish: "Synkkä syöveri" (The Grim Whirlpool), WSOY, 2006, ISBN 951-0-31491-9
- Greek: "Η Σπαρακτική Σπηλιά", Ελληνικά Γράμματα
- Japanese: "ぶきみな岩屋" (The Weird Grotto), Soshisha, 2006, ISBN 4-7942-1546-0
- Norwegian: Den grusomme grotten, Tor Edvin Dahl, Cappelen Damm, 2005, ISBN 9788202245269
- Russian: "Угрюмый Грот", Azbuka, 2006, ISBN 5-35201-790-7
- French: "La Grotte Gorgone" (The Gorgon Grotto)
- Polish : "Groźna grota" (The Menacing Grotto)
- Thai: "ถ้ำทะมึน", Nanmeebooks Teen, 2006, ISBN 9789749906613

== Adaptation ==
The book was adapted into the third and fourth episodes of the third season of the television series adaptation produced by Netflix.

== See also ==
- Esmé Squalor
- Carmelita Spats
- V.F.D.
