= The Reptile Room =

1999 children's novel

- American cover art
- Author: Lemony Snicket (pen name of Daniel Handler)
- Illustrator: Brett Helquist
- Cover artist: Brett Helquist
- Language: English
- Series: A Series of Unfortunate Events
- Publisher: HarperCollins
- Publication date: September 30, 1999
- Publication place: United States
- Media type: Print (hardback & paperback)
- Pages: 190
- ISBN: 0-06-440767-5 (first edition, hardback)
- OCLC: 41086597
- Dewey Decimal: Fic 21
- LC Class: PZ7.S6795 Re 1999
- Preceded by: The Bad Beginning
- Followed by: The Wide Window

Book the Second: The Reptile Room is the second book in the children's series A Series of Unfortunate Events, written by Daniel Handler under the pseudonym Lemony Snicket. The book tells the story of the Baudelaire orphans, as they are sent to live with a distant relative named Montgomery Montgomery.

== Plot ==
The three Baudelaire orphans have been placed under the care of their distant relative, herpetologist Dr. Montgomery Montgomery. "Uncle Monty", is a kind man who offers them coconut cream cake, so the children immediately like him. He lets them each choose their own bedroom and informs them that they are going to accompany him on a trip to Peru to study snakes.

The children are fascinated by the many snakes in the "Reptile Room", a giant hall in which Uncle Monty's reptile collection is stored. They meet the Incredibly Deadly Viper, which Uncle Monty recently discovered, whose name is actually a misnomer to its harmless and friendly nature used as a prank for the Herpetological Society. The three children are each given jobs in the Reptile Room: Violet is given the job of inventing traps for new snakes found in Peru, Klaus is told to read books on snakes to help advise Uncle Monty, and Sunny's job is to bite ropes into usable pieces.

When Stephano, the successor of the original assistant Gustav arrives, the children realize immediately that he is Count Olaf, who was onto their family fortune, in disguise. They manage to talk to Uncle Monty alone the day before their trip to Peru, but Monty is instead convinced that Stephano is a spy trying to steal information from his research and fails to understand their claims that Stephano is Olaf. Regardless, he tears up Stephano's ticket to Peru before taking the kids to a movie.

The following morning, the Baudelaires discover Monty's dead body. Stephano still tries to take the children to Peru. However, as they are leaving the estate, Stephano's car crashes into Mr. Poe's car. They return to the house, where Poe and Stephano discuss what to do with the children. Mr. Poe refuses to believe the children when they say Stephano is Count Olaf in disguise, as Stephano somehow lacks a tattoo of an eye on his ankle. Dr. Lucafont arrives and performs an autopsy, claiming Monty was killed by the Mamba du Mal.

Violet tells her siblings to cause a distraction; the Incredibly Deadly Viper pretends to attack Sunny, while Violet creates a lockpick from the power plug of Klaus' reading lamp. She then uses it to open Count Olaf's suitcase to reveal needles with the venom from a snake as well as some powder that he used to cover up the eye tattoo. Klaus reveals to Mr. Poe, Dr. Lucafont and Count Olaf that, from his studies of the Mamba du Mal, if the Mamba du Mal attacked Uncle Monty he would be bruised, while Monty was pale. Violet shows her evidence, and Mr. Poe rubs away the powder on Stephano's ankle to reveal the eye tattoo, proving Stephano was Olaf, who reveals that he murdered Gustav. Unfortunately, Olaf manages to escape again when Dr. Lucafont (the hook-handed man in disguise) helps him get away, leaving Mr. Poe to take the orphans to a new home. To rub salt in this wound, a man named Bruce and the Herpetological Society takes all of Uncle Monty’s reptiles away.

== Foreshadowing ==
In the final picture, one of the men is wearing a shirt that reads Lachrymose Leeches, which is a hint to the next book: The Wide Window.

== Critical reception ==
Publishers Weekly said Snicket "uses formal, Latinate language and intrusive commentary to hilarious effect" and complimented Helquist's "exquisitely detailed drawings of Gothic gargoyles and mischievous eyes", which were said to "echo the contents of this elegantly designed hardcover".

== Other editions ==
=== Audiobook ===
The audiobook version of "The Reptile Room" was read by Tim Curry. A review at AudioFile gave the audiobook an "Earphones Award", calling it "fabulously funny" and complimenting Curry's "enormous talents".

=== The Reptile Room; or, Murder! ===
The Reptile Room; or, Murder! is a paperback rerelease of The Reptile Room, designed to mimic Victorian penny dreadfuls. It was released on May 8, 2007. The book features a new full-colour cover, seven new illustrations, and the second part of a serial supplement entitled The Cornucopian Cavalcade, which includes the second part of a 13-part comic by Michael Kupperman entitled The Spoily Brats, an advice column written by Lemony Snicket, and the second part of a story by Stephen Leacock entitled A Psychic Pstory of the Psupernatural, along with other novelty additions.

=== Translations ===
- Finnish: Käärmekammio, lit. 'The Snake Chamber'. Translated by Ulla Lempinen. Helsinki: Summa. 2001. ISBN 9525418049.
- French: Le laboratoire aux serpents, lit. 'The Snake Laboratory'. Translated by Rose-Marie Vassallo. Paris: Nathan. 6 June 2002. ISBN 9782092110348.
- Polish: Gabinet gadów, lit. 'The Reptile Cabinet'. Translated by Jolanta Kozak. Warsaw: Egmont. 15 July 2002. ISBN 9788323714507.
- Swedish: Reptilrummet. Translated by John-Henri Holmberg. Stockholm: Egmont Richter. 1 September 2002. ISBN 9789177113355.
- Spanish: La habitación de los reptiles. Translated by Néstor Busquets. Buenos Aires: Montena. 7 September 2004. ISBN 9780307209351.
- German: Der Haus der Schlangen, lit. 'The House of Snakes'. Translated by Birgitt Kollmann. Munich: Manhattan. 30 September 2004. ISBN 9783442545803.
- Italian: La stanza delle serpi, lit. 'The Snake Room'. Translated by V. Daniele. Florence: Salani. 31 December 2010. ISBN 9788862564038.

== Adaptations ==
Elements of The Reptile Room were featured in the 2004 film adaptation of the first three books in the series, Lemony Snicket's A Series of Unfortunate Events. The book was adapted into the third and fourth episodes of the first season of the television series adaptation produced by Netflix.
