= The Bad Beginning =

1999 children's novel by Lemony Snicket

- US Cover of The Bad Beginning
- Author: Lemony Snicket (pen name of Daniel Handler)
- Illustrator: Brett Helquist
- Cover artist: Brett Helquist
- Language: English
- Series: A Series of Unfortunate Events
- Genre: Gothic fiction Absurdist fiction Mystery
- Publisher: HarperCollins
- Publication date: September 30, 1999
- Publication place: United States
- Media type: Print (hardback & paperback)
- Pages: 162
- ISBN: 0-06-440766-7
- OCLC: 41070636
- Dewey Decimal: Fic 21
- LC Class: PZ7.S6795 Bad 1999
- Followed by: The Reptile Room

Book the First: The Bad Beginning is the first novel of the children's novel series A Series of Unfortunate Events by Lemony Snicket. The novel tells the story of three children, Violet, Klaus, and Sunny Baudelaire, who become orphans following a house fire in which their parents perished, and are sent to live with Count Olaf, who attempts to steal their inheritance.

The book was published on September 30, 1999, by HarperCollins and illustrated by Brett Helquist. An audiobook was released in 2003 with narration by Tim Curry, and several special editions of the book have been made. The book has been translated into many different languages, and inspired a film based on the series starring Jim Carrey and a Netflix TV series starring Neil Patrick Harris.

== Plot ==
Violet Baudelaire is fourteen years old and loves inventing; her brother Klaus is a twelve year old with a great love for knowledge and literature; their sister Sunny is a baby and has four surprisingly large, sharp buck teeth, with which she loves to bite. While they are at Briny Beach, the banker Mr. Poe, tells them that their parents have died in a fire that destroyed their home. After staying with them for a while, he places them in the care of Count Olaf, said to be a distant relative, although the children have never heard of him before. Olaf's ramshackle house is filthy and covered in disconcerting images of eyes; it has a tower which the Baudelaires are forbidden from entering. Count Olaf is unpleasant and easily angered, and it soon becomes clear that Count Olaf is scheming to collect the Baudelaires' fortune. The only solace the children find is spending time with their neighbor, Justice Strauss.

For the next few days, Olaf keeps the Baudelaires busy by forcing them to clean his house. The Baudelaires disagree but do not dare to object. One day, the Baudelaires are set the task of making dinner for Olaf and his theatre troupe. The troupe contains two white faced women, a hook-handed man, a bald man with a long nose and a person of indeterminate gender. The siblings make puttanesca, but when Olaf arrives, he demands roast beef. The children remind him that he never asked them to make roast beef, which angers Count Olaf, who lifts Sunny into the air. Then he strikes Klaus across the face after Klaus reminds him that he only provided them with one bed and a pile of rocks for the three of them to sleep on and to play with, and that the Baudelaire fortune is not to be used until Violet comes of age.

A few days later, after Mr. Poe refuses to help them, Count Olaf forces the Baudelaire children to act in a play called *The Marvelous Marriage*, written under the name “Al Funcoot" (an anagram for "Count Olaf"), with Violet playing the role of his bride. After secretly borrowing a book from Justice Strauss’s library, Klaus discovers that the wedding in the play will be legally valid, allowing Olaf to steal their fortune. However, Olaf threatens Sunny’s life by keeping her trapped in a birdcage outside his tower window unless Violet and Klaus obey him. Violet invents a grappling hook to climb the tower, but the hook-handed man captures her. Klaus is later brought to the tower, and the siblings are locked together until the play begins.

After Violet signs the marriage document, Olaf announces to the audience that their wedding was legally binding. Justice Strauss objects, but concedes that the law requires them to hand over the Baudelaire fortune to Olaf, to Mr. Poe's dismay. Violet interrupts to proclaim that the marriage was not legally binding, as she signed with her left hand despite being right-handed and the wording is 'own hand'. Justice Strauss agrees that this invalidates the marriage. Unfortunately, before Mr. Poe can arrest Olaf for his actions, one of his associates turns the lights in the theatre off and he is able to escape. Before his escape, however, he tells Violet that he will get their fortune if it is the last thing he will ever do, and in the event that he does, he will kill the children with his own two hands. Justice Strauss tells the Baudelaires that she is willing to adopt them; however, Mr. Poe says that this would go against their parents' will, as Justice Strauss is not a relative. He decides to take them back to his household until he can find another guardian for them. The Baudelaires reflect on their uncertain future as they are driven away.

== Foreshadowing ==
In the final image of every book, there is an object that gives a hint to the next book. In this case, there is a snake around a street light as Mr. Poe drives the Baudelaires away from Justice Strauss. This hints at the The Reptile Room, where the Baudelaires‘ new guardian study snakes and other reptiles.

== Critical reception ==
In 2012, School Library Journal named The Bad Beginning the 48th best children's novel. Kirkus Reviews noted the uncomfortably macabre tone of the novel, warning that because "the Baudelaire children are truly sympathetic characters", the novel is "not for the squeamish". Catherine Pelosi of Kids' Book Review responded positively to The Bad Beginning, describing it as "exciting, humorous and appropriately dark".

== Special editions ==
=== The Bad Beginning: Rare Edition ===
The Bad Beginning: Rare Edition (ISBN 9780060518288) was published by HarperCollins on September 23, 2003. In addition to a brown slipcase showcasing the original cover, a redesigned book cover with green eye-patterns throughout, additional illustrations, and a stand-up cardboard portrait of the Marvelous Marriage cast specially illustrated for this edition by Brett Helquist, this edition also contains a fourteenth chapter filled with author's notes, many of which foreshadow later events in the series or provide excessively detailed information about the events in The Bad Beginning itself.

A re-release of The Bad Beginning: Rare Edition (ISBN 9780062847232) was published by HarperCollins as a Barnes and Noble Exclusive Edition in 2017. It contains all additional material apart from the portrait of the characters from The Marvelous Marriage cast, and is contained within a dark blue slipcase which sets it apart from the first Rare Edition published in 2003.

An ebook version dubbed the Rare Edition Enhanced (ISBN 9780062188090) published in 2012 is available for purchase on limited platforms including Barnes and Noble.

=== The Bad Beginning; or, Orphans! ===
The Bad Beginning; or, Orphans! is a paperback edition of The Bad Beginning designed to mimic a Victorian penny dreadful. It was released on May 8, 2007. The book features a new full-color cover, seven new illustrations, and the first part of a serial supplement entitled The Cornucopian Cavalcade, which in this edition includes the first of 13-part comic entitled The Spoily Brats along with a page of Victorian-era false advertisements, both produced by Michael Kupperman; an advice column written by Lemony Snicket along with a page listing every entry in A Series of Unfortunate Events (some of which are fictional); the first part of a story entitled Q: A Psychic pstory of the psupernatural by Stephen Leacock.

=== Other special editions ===
Two editions of The Bad Beginning were published by Egmont Publishing on October 1, 2003 — The Bad Beginning: Collectors' Edition (ISBN 1-4052-0725-6) and The Bad Beginning: Limited Edition (ISBN 1-4052-0726-4). The Collectors' Edition is priced at £14.99 while sealed copies of the Limited Edition on eBay shows on the barcode the price tag of £100 alongside a different ISBN 9781405207263. Both editions are printed and bound in Italy.

Both editions come in a larger format containing three plates of color artwork that are redrawn from the original edition of the book, and two plates of new color artwork illustrated specially for the edition by Brett Helquist, depicting Count Olaf's raspberry breakfast and the Baudelaires in a library (the latter was later reused for the 2006 cover of The Puzzling Puzzles: Bothersome Games Which Will Bother Some People (A Series of Unfortunate Events Activity Book)).

The Limited Edition is bound in leather and contained within a slipcase, similar to the Rare Edition. Each copy contains a bookplate signed by Daniel Handler as the "official representative of Lemony Snicket". It is said that only 1,000 copies were produced. In comparison, the Collectors' Edition does not come with a signed bookplate, slipcase, nor leather binding, but what sets it apart from the Limited Edition is the die-cut window design on the front cover.

A new Short-Lived Edition was released for general sale on June 14, 2012. Published at an affordable price to introduce new readers to the series, it contains a sticker on the front cover with the tagline "THE SHORT-LIVED EDITION - Buy it for a pittance! - $3.99 - Then please read something else."

A Deluxe Limited Edition (ISBN 9780063437531) is set to be released on October 14, 2025. In this limited-run deluxe edition, The Bad Beginning will receive a luxurious soft touch cover with gold foil stamping, full-color digital edges and endpapers, and bonus content from Lemony Snicket and Brett Helquist.

== Audiobook ==
Two audiobook versions of this novel were released. The first version was released in September 2003. It was read by Tim Curry and featured Daniel Handler, under the pseudonym Lemony Snicket, who read a portion, A Conversation Between the Author and Leonard S. Marcus, which won an "Earphones Award" on AudioFile, which described the audiobook as "fabulously funny" and complimented the conversation involving Handler.

The second version was released in October 2004, after the release of the film, Lemony Snicket's A Series of Unfortunate Events. This multi-voice cast audio book was narrated by Tim Curry and featured Tara Sands, Mitchell Federan, Dick Rodstein, Maggie Albright, L.J. Ganser, Oliver Wyman, and Carolee Goodgold. This version also included sound effects and a soundtrack. This edition of The Bad Beginning was an Audie Awards finalist for Children's Titles for Ages 8+ in 2005, and a Grammy Award Nominee for Best Spoken Word Album for Children in 2005. AudioFile gave the audiobook a positive review, although stated that "the cast of seven at first sound self-consciously formal until one realizes that the acting is supposed to be as mannered as the clever writing".

== Adaptations ==
=== Film ===
Elements of The Bad Beginning were featured in the 2004 film adaptation of the first three books in the series, Lemony Snicket's A Series of Unfortunate Events.

=== Television ===
The book was adapted into the first two episodes of the first season of the television series adaptation produced by Netflix.

== Translations ==
- Norwegian: En grufull begynnelse. Translated by Aleksander Melli. Oslo: Cappelen. 2000. ISBN 9788202189471.
- Croatian: Loš početak. Translated by Melita Kovačević. Zagreb: Algoritam. 2001. ISBN 9789536450770.
- Dutch: Het bittere begin. Translated by Huberte Vriesendorp. Amsterdam: Ploegsma. 2001. ISBN 9789021617930.
- Spanish: Un mal principio. Translated by Néstor Busquets. Barcelona: Lumen Editorial. 2001. ISBN 9788426437402.
- Swedish: En olustig början. Translated by John-Henri Holmberg. Stockholm: Egmont Richter AB. 2002. ISBN 9789177113348.
- Estonian: Ahastav algus. Translated by Maarja Kangro. Tallinn: Draakon & Kuu. 2003. ISBN 9789985943021.
- Finnish: Ankea alku. Translated by Mika Ojakangas. Helsinki: WSOY. 2003. ISBN 9789510285640.
- Latvian: Slikts sākums. Translated by Daina Ozoliņa. Riga: Zvaigzne ABC. 2003. ISBN 9789984229362.
- Russian: Скверное начало, romanized: Skvernoye nachalo. Translated by Nataliya Rakhmanova. Saint Petersburg: Azbooka. 2003. ISBN 9785352003602.
- Slovene: Slab začetek. Translated by Maja Savelli. Ljubljana: Tuma. 2003. ISBN 9789616470032.
- German: Der schreckliche Anfang. Translated by Klaus Weimann. Munich: Manhattan. 2004. ISBN 9783442545797.
- Lithuanian: Bloga pradžia. Translated by Violeta Palčinskaitė. Vilnius: Presvika. 2004. ISBN 9789955567646.
- Turkish: Kötü günler başlarken, lit. 'As Bad Days Begin'. Translated by Nurettin Elhüseyni. Istanbul: Doğan Egmont Yayıncılık. 2005. ISBN 9789753235822.
- Georgian: ცუდი დასაწყისი, romanized: tsudi dasats'q'isi. Translated by Aia Beraia. Tbilisi: Sulakauri. 2016. ISBN 9789941237072.
- Ukrainian: Поганий початок, romanized: Pohanyy pochatok. Translated by Oleksandr Mokrovolskyy. Kyiv: KM Books. 2017. ISBN 9789669755414.
- Polish: Przykry początek. Translated by Jolanta Kozak. Warsaw: Harper Collins. 2022. ISBN 9788327672858.
