= Lemony Snicket =

Pen name and fictional character

- A Series of Unfortunate Events character
- Patrick Warburton as Lemony Snicket and Lemony's signature from the books
- First appearance: The Bad Beginning
- Created by: Daniel Handler
- Portrayed by: Patrick Warburton (TV series)
- Voiced by: Tim Curry (video game, audiobook narrator); Jude Law (film); Daniel Handler (photography, audiobook narrator)

In-universe information
- Occupation: Biographer; researcher; theater critic; rhetor; convict; writer
- Family: Jacques Snicket (brother); Kit Snicket (sister); Beatrice Baudelaire II (niece)
- Significant other: Beatrice Baudelaire I (ex-fiancée)

Lemony Snicket is the pen name of American author Daniel Handler (born 1970) and a fictional character of his creation. Handler has published various children's books under the name, including A Series of Unfortunate Events (the first of which was published in 1999), which has sold over 60 million copies and spawned a 2004 film and Netflix TV series from 2017 to 2019 of the same name. Lemony Snicket also serves as the in-universe author who investigates and re-tells the story of the Baudelaire orphans in A Series of Unfortunate Events.

Snicket is also the subject of a fictional autobiography titled Lemony Snicket: The Unauthorized Autobiography. Further telling of Snicket's adventures can be found in the four-part children's series All the Wrong Questions, as well as a pamphlet titled 13 Shocking Secrets You'll Wish You Never Knew About Lemony Snicket (released in promotion of The End). Other works by Snicket include The Baby in the Manger, The Composer Is Dead, Horseradish: Bitter Truths You Can't Avoid, The Latke Who Couldn't Stop Screaming, The Lump of Coal, and 13 Words.

In the 2004 film, Lemony Snicket is voiced by Jude Law while James Henderson plays him physically. He documents the events of the film on a typewriter from inside a clock tower. In the video game based on the film, his voice is provided by Tim Curry. In the Netflix series, Snicket is interpreted as a mysterious and omniscient narrator chronicling the events of the Baudelaire children in a manner similar to Rod Serling, and is portrayed by Patrick Warburton.

== Characterization ==
In A Series of Unfortunate Events, the narrator, Lemony Snicket, is given his own backstory. He is said to have come from a family of three children. His brother Jacques (who was murdered in The Vile Village) and sister Kit were V.F.D. members and friends of the Baudelaire parents. Both Jacques and Kit appear as supporting characters in the books. He also knew Count Olaf in his early life, as the two attended school together. As a child, he was kidnapped and inducted as a "neophyte" into V.F.D., where he was trained in rhetoric and sent on seemingly pointless missions, while all connections were severed from his former life, apart from his siblings Jacques and Kit (who were also kidnapped and inducted). Consequently, Snicket attended a V.F.D.-run boarding school in his youth with several other characters from the series. He later received tuition at a V.F.D. headquarters in the Mortmain Mountains and, after graduation, was employed by a newspaper called The Daily Punctilio as an obituary spell-checker and theater critic.

At some point, Lemony became an orphan at an early age, as he stated in The Hero of the Story that he had no parents. This implied that Jacob and his wife are deceased.

As a character, Snicket is a harried, troubled writer and photographer who is falsely accused of various felonies and continuously hunted by the police and his enemies, the fire-starting side of the secret organization V.F.D. (Volunteer Fire Department). In the organization, he met and fell in love with an associate named Beatrice, to whom he got engaged. He was falsely accused of murder and arson. Eventually, the fallacies grew so much that The Daily Punctilio reported his death. Beatrice later moved on and married Bertrand Baudelaire, becoming the mother of Violet, Klaus, and Sunny Baudelaire, the protagonists of A Series of Unfortunate Events. Fourteen years thereafter, Beatrice and Bertrand were supposedly murdered in a house fire, leaving the Baudelaire children orphaned and then pursued by Snicket's former associate, Count Olaf. Snicket feels indebted to his former fiancée and embarks on a quest to chronicle the lives of the Baudelaire children until they are old enough to face the world's troubles on their own.

A library is like an island in the middle of a vast sea of ignorance, particularly if the library is very tall and the surrounding area has been flooded.

— Lemony Snicket

Lemony Snicket has taken it upon himself to research and document the story of the Baudelaire orphans for "many personal and legal reasons". He traces their movements and collects evidence relating to their adventures. Though he is never specified to have met the children in the book series, in the Netflix adaptation of The Penultimate Peril he is confirmed as the taxi driver trying to take the children away from the hotel after Dewey Denouement's death (this was only implied in the original book).

As the series progresses, it becomes increasingly clear that Snicket knew the Baudelaire orphans' parents well through their connections to the V.F.D. However, as mentioned in The Hostile Hospital and The End, despite all of Lemony's research and hard work, he still does not know the Baudelaire children's current location, position, or status. Additionally, it is unclear if he ever met them in the books.

Snicket is frequently disparaging of himself; he has described himself as a coward, and at various points in his novels comments that he would not have been as brave as the Baudelaire children had he been in their situation. He also confesses that he has done things that were not noble, such as the original theft of the sugar bowl from Esmé Squalor. He implied he had a part in the murder of Count Olaf's parents, and that Beatrice was involved as well.

In the books' narration, Snicket describes doing many unusual things in his free time, including hiding all traces of his actions, finding new hiding places, considering suspicious dishes, and researching the perilous lives of the Baudelaire children. He claims to often write himself citations for bravery to cheer himself up, but these attempts are always in vain.

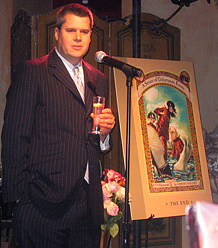
Daniel Handler in 2006

== As pen name ==
The name Lemony Snicket originally came from research in Handler's first book, The Basic Eight. Handler wanted to receive material from organizations that he found "offensive or funny," but did not want to use his real name, so he invented "Lemony Snicket" as a pseudonym. The name's similarity to Jiminy Cricket was "likely a Freudian slip". Handler told NPR in an interview that "the character of Lemony Snicket, this man who speaks directly to the reader and also who is tangentially involved in the stories that he's telling, is really more of a character. We just thought it would be fun to publish the books under the name of this character." Handler has also written or contributed to other works under the Lemony Snicket persona that are not related to A Series of Unfortunate Events. He has stated, "there's a chance some other matters may take up Mr. Snicket's attention, that he may research and publish, but I'm always wary of making such promises".

Handler publishes most of his children's novels under the pen name, including the thirteen-book A Series of Unfortunate Events series, the four-book All the Wrong Questions series, The Baby in the Manger, The Composer Is Dead, Horseradish: Bitter Truths You Can't Avoid, The Latke Who Couldn't Stop Screaming, The Lump of Coal, and 13 Words.

As Snicket, Handler wrote an introduction and endnotes for The Bears' Famous Invasion of Sicily by Dino Buzzati, his favorite children's book, that referenced A Series of Unfortunate Events. Noisy Outlaws, Unfriendly Blobs, and Some Other Things That Aren't as Scary, Maybe, Depending on How You Feel About Lost Lands, Stray Cellphones, Creatures from the Sky, Parents Who Disappear in Peru, a Man Named Lars Farf, and One Other Story We Couldn't Quite Finish, So Maybe You Could Help Us Out, a 2005 McSweeney's short story compilation, has an introduction and unfinished short story attributed to Lemony Snicket.

Snicket also wrote The Composer Is Dead, a murder mystery designed to introduce young readers to the instruments of the orchestra; it was previously produced as an orchestral work by the San Francisco Symphony Orchestra, with Handler narrating as Snicket, and a recording of the performance is to be included with every copy of the expanded book.

In 2013, Snicket wrote the introduction to the 1989–1990 edition of Fantagraphics Books' The Complete Peanuts series.
