= The Wright 3 =

2006 children's book by Blue Balliett

- Front cover, designed by Brett Helquist
- Author: Blue Balliett
- Illustrator: Brett Helquist
- Cover artist: Brett Helquist
- Language: English
- Genre: Children's Mystery novel
- Published: April 1, 2006 by Scholastic Press
- Publication place: United States of America
- Media type: Print (Hardback)
- Pages: 318 pgs.
- ISBN: 0-439-69367-5
- OCLC: 61204254
- LC Class: PZ7.B2128 Wri 2006
- Preceded by: Chasing Vermeer
- Followed by: The Calder Game

The Wright 3 is a 2006 children's mystery novel written by Blue Balliett and illustrated by Brett Helquist. It was released on April 1, 2006, and is the sequel to Balliett's 2004 children's novel Chasing Vermeer. It chronicles how Calder, Petra, and Tommy strive to save the Robie House in their neighborhood, Hyde Park, Chicago. The underlying plot elements include 3-D pentominoes, architect Frank Lloyd Wright, the Robie House, Fibonacci numbers, The Invisible Man, and mysterious occurrences.

A sequel, The Calder Game, was published in 2008.

== Origins and inspiration ==
The Wright 3 is the sequel to Balliett's second novel, Chasing Vermeer. She debated on writing a sequel as she walked around Hyde Park, and the Robie House stood out to her.

Balliett was inspired by the number 3, as it appeared in the triangles of Wright's windows on the Robie House. She then thought about how it was hard to communicate equally with three people and tried to weave the two together.

== Synopsis ==
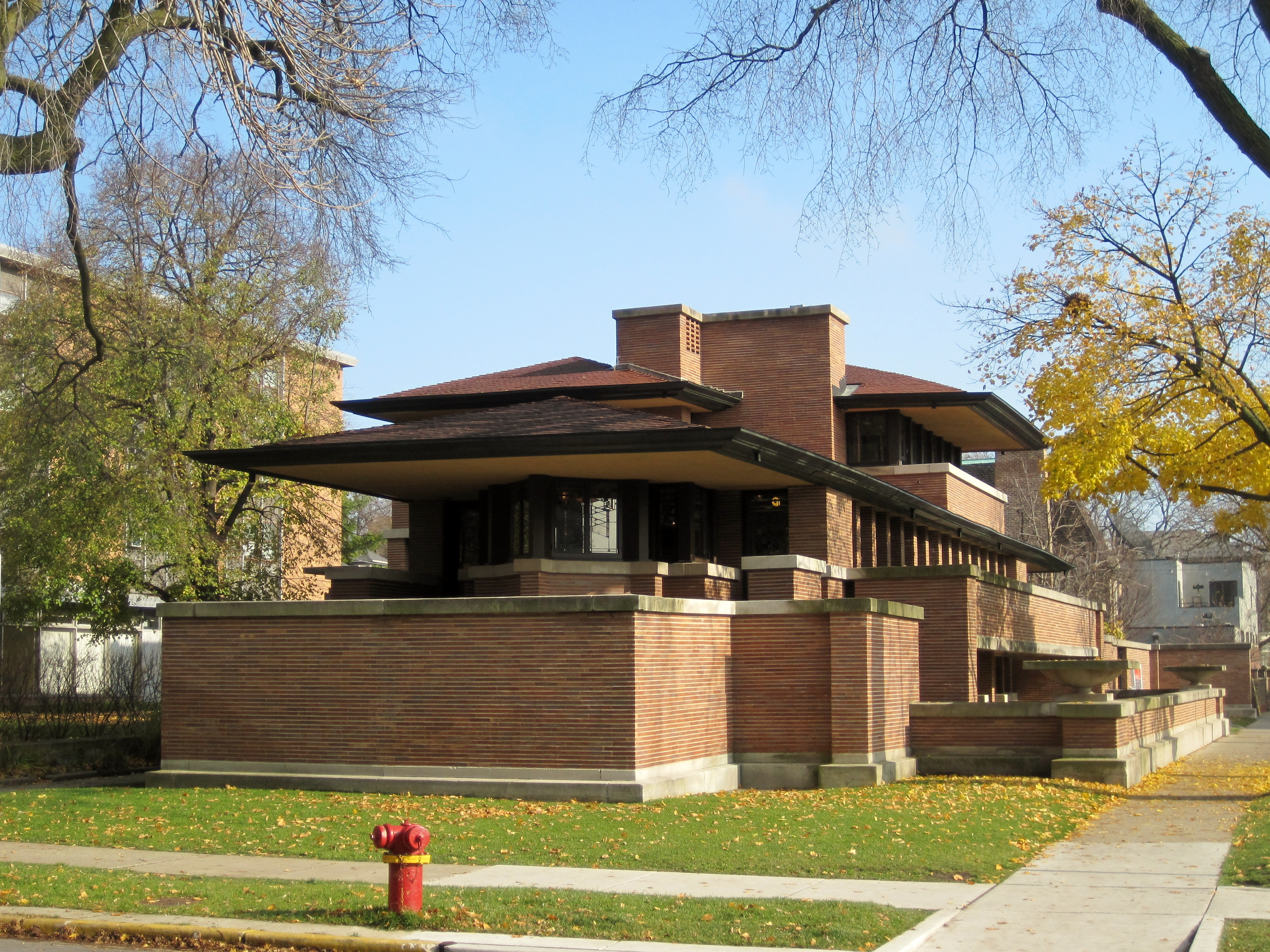
The Robie House

Calder's friend Tommy Segovia, who moved away a year before, has moved back to Hyde Park, Chicago. He is immediately jealous of Calder and Petra as they received the "glory" of saving a Vermeer painting in the previous book (Chasing Vermeer). Tommy feels that he deserves something as well. In his first new day of class, Ms. Hussey announces that the world-famous Robie House is soon to be demolished, which she considers to be murder. The class takes a field trip to the house, and both Calder and Petra discover that there are many secrets concerning the building that they were not aware of. After Tommy learns to tolerate Petra, the three (who call themselves 'The Wright 3') work to save the house, even breaking into it toward the end. Tommy finds a fish talisman in the Robie House garden and realizes it is worth a lot of money. Finally, after saving their own lives against a band of robbers in the Robie House, they manage to save that of the house.

=== Illustrations ===
In a few illustrations, there is a drawing of a fish (referring to Frank Lloyd Wright's lucky talisman) that he lost while building the Robie House. They appear in some chapters with the fibonacci sequence. On one of the last illustrations, a dragon can be found, expressing the change from carp to dragon in the story. Toward the bottom of the last picture there are footprints from the invisible man. In some images, a face could be spotted.

== Critical reception ==
Adam Liptak in a review for The New York Times praised Helquist's work, but noted an "overstuffed narrative", although the loose ends could be perceived as charming or frustrating. He also pointed out that too much of the book seemed devoted on the relationship between Tommy and Petra and the climax was reminiscent of cartoons. Kirkus Reviews was more positive toward the "tense struggle to transform from duo to trio" and gave a starred review. BookPage also left a positive review, praising the "framework" of the novel. The website Kidsreads praised the plot twists and coincidences. Children's Literature reviewer Erin Pelletier claimed The Wright 3 would "not disappoint readers" and thought the Robie House was "woven beautifully throughout the book".

=== Awards ===
Kaden Enterprises, a game puzzle company, awarded Balliett their Annual Pentomino Excellence Award for her use of the tool in Chasing Vermeer and The Wright Three. The award incorporated the F, L, and W pentominoes (the initials of Frank Lloyd Wright).
