= Chasing Vermeer =

2004 book written by Blue Balliett and illustrated by Brett Helquist

- First US edition cover
- Author: Blue Balliett
- Translator: John Adams
- Cover artist: Brett Helquist
- Language: English
- Genre: Young adult fiction, mystery
- Publisher: Scholastic Press
- Publication date: June 1, 2004
- Publication place: US
- Media type: Print (hardback & paperback)
- Pages: 272
- ISBN: 0-439-37294-1
- OCLC: 51172514
- Dewey Decimal: [Fic] 21
- LC Class: PZ7.B2128 Ch 2004
- Followed by: The Wright 3

Chasing Vermeer is a 2004 children's art mystery novel written by Blue Balliett and illustrated by Brett Helquist. Set in Hyde Park, Chicago near the University of Chicago, the novel follows two children, Calder Pillay and Petra Andalee. After a famous Johannes Vermeer painting, A Lady Writing, is stolen en route to the Art Institute of Chicago, Calder and Petra work together to try to recover it. The thief publishes many advertisements in the newspaper, explaining that he will give the painting back if the community can discover which paintings under Vermeer's name were really painted by him. This causes Petra, Calder, and the rest of Hyde Park to examine art more closely. Themes of art, chance, coincidence, deception, and problem-solving are apparent.

The novel was written for Balliett's classroom intended to deal with real-world issues. Balliett values children's ideas and wrote the book specifically to highlight that. Chasing Vermeer has won several awards, including the Edgar and the Agatha. In 2006, the sequel entitled The Wright 3 was published, followed by The Calder Game in 2008.

== Inspiration and origin ==
Chasing Vermeer is Blue Balliett's first published book. Its original purpose was a book to read to her class for fun. She realized that a mystery about "real" art issues had not been written since E.L. Konigsburg's 1967 novel From the Mixed-Up Files of Mrs. Basil E. Frankweiler, and desired to write what she wished to read. Chasing Vermeer took about five years to write, as Balliett was also a teacher and parent. She compared writing the book to weaving, as she first wrote mainly about art, but then incorporated the pentominoes and classroom scenes, creating many different levels to read on. She admits that it ended up more complex than she had thought it would be.

Balliett used art and blank plates as inspiration for the characters' names. Calder Pillay is derived from the artist Alexander Calder and Petra Andalee was inspired by the architecture in Petra, Jordan. The names were meant to be different, which Balliett considered "fun for a child." Balliett felt that she could capture the attention of reluctant readers if they related to characters who enjoyed writing and math. Calder and Petra's teacher, Ms. Hussey, was inspired by an old name on Nantucket Island and the old-fashioned word hussy. Balliett compares herself to Ms. Hussey, stating that "[we] think a lot alike." Some of Ms. Hussey's assignments and dialogue even came from Balliett's classroom. She chose the setting of Hyde Park, Chicago, where she currently lives, because she considered it full of secrets that children could discover.

== Plot summary ==
The story begins with three residents of Hyde Park receiving anonymous letters. The letters ask for the recipients' help in solving a centuries-old art mystery. In the days that follow, Petra and Calder's teacher, Ms. Isabel Hussey, gives several assignments related to unique letters and letters found in works of art.

One day after school, Calder follows Petra to Powell's Bookstore, and the pair run into each other, beginning their unusual friendship. Calder is obsessed with pentominoes that he keeps in his pocket and uses to send and receive coded messages, while Petra is an adventurer.

Ms. Hussey's next assignment requires the children to present their interpretation of art. Calder chooses a geographer's box with a painting on it. Petra chooses Lo! by Charles Fort, a strange book in which Fort posits that life is not a series of coincidences but is an interconnecting web of patterns.

Calder and Petra learn that Lo! used to belong to Mrs. Louise Coffin Sharpe. Calder visits Mrs. Sharpe and notices she has a copy of the picture from his geography box, The Geographer by Johannes Vermeer. Meanwhile, Petra has a vision of a lady in an antiquated dress with pearl earrings. For Halloween, she dresses as the lady, and Calder recognizes her as the woman in Vermeer's painting, A Lady Writing.

A Lady Writing is on its way from the National Gallery to an exhibit in Chicago. Before the painting arrives, it is stolen. The thief sends a letter to the Chicago Tribune stating that he has stolen the painting to raise awareness that someone else painted some of Vermeer's paintings. The thief claims that once the art world has repudiated the authenticity of the paintings, he will return A Lady Writing.

The children learn that Ms. Hussey received one of the letters and begin to suspect that the painting is somewhere on school grounds. Calder has an epiphany, connecting himself and Petra with the number 12. This clue leads them to the painting. On exiting the school, the thief begins chasing them, and Calder stays behind, urging Petra to run on with the painting. Petra and a policeman return to the playground where she last saw Calder. While they are searching, the thief takes the painting out of the patrol car.

Back home, Petra finds Calder unconscious with the painting under his arm in her neighbor's treehouse. Calder had hit his head in the altercation. He pretended to be unconscious, then followed the thief to the treehouse, where he found the painting and succumbed to his concussion.

Amid these events, Calder's friend, Tommy Segovia, writes that his stepfather has abandoned the family in New York, where they recently moved. The thief, later found dead of a heart attack, was Xavier Glitts. Glitts had married Tommy's mother, using the pseudonym of Old Fred, to infiltrate the community. This allowed him to case the university and identify local Vermeer enthusiasts, whom he could later implicate.

== Genre ==
Chasing Vermeer is classified in the mystery genre, although it was described by Liz Szabla of Scholastic as "a puzzle, wrapped in a mystery, disguised as an adventure, and delivered as a work of art." Scholastic's teaching website additionally added suspense due to the surprise ending.

== Themes ==
Some of Balliett's "real-world ideas" in Chasing Vermeer were "Do coincidences mean anything?" and "What is art and what makes it valuable?" Balliett says her "central message" is "kids are powerful thinkers, and their ideas are valuable, and that adults don't have all the answers."

A book by Rita Soltan entitled Reading Raps: A Book Club Guide for Librarians, Kids, and Families analyzed Chasing Vermeer's themes as follows:

Deception and problem-solving are central themes in this novel as both the thief and the central adult players use a variety of ways to hide the truth while the children employ a series of mathematical and problem-solving concepts to piece together the clues to the puzzle. In addition, Calder and Petra develop a special friendship and certain respect for the value of art.

As the thief gains publicity by challenging the community to figure out which paintings claimed to be Vermeer's were indeed painted by him, everyone starts to look at the depth in art. Sondra Eklund, who writes a book review blog, noted that the reader was left with the impression to study Vermeer's paintings and art more closely. In the book, Ms. Hussey challenges her class to the question, "What is art?"

Other themes include chance and coincidence. During Chasing Vermeer, Charles Fort's book, Lo!, inspires the children to list and pay attention to coincidences as they realize that they are more than what they seem and explore the concept that they make up one unexplained pattern. Balliett stated that she wanted to convey how coincidences were noticeable and felt meaningful, and how they could matter even if they were unexplainable.

== Audiobook ==
The audiobook for Chasing Vermeer, read by Ellen Reilly, was released on November 27, 2007 from Listening Library. It runs about 4 hours and 47 minutes. AudioFile magazine praised Reilly's voices and pace, but noted that, "Once the mystery is solved, however, the ending seems tacked on, falling flat."

== Critical reception ==
Chasing Vermeer received generally positive reviews. The New York Times praised the description and mystery. It was also listed as one of their "Notable Books of 2004". Kirkus Reviews awarded it a starred review with the consensus that "Art, intrigue, and plenty of twists and turns make this art mystery a great read." Children's Literature reviewer Claudia Mills gave generally positive comments, calling the novel "engrossing and engaging". The website Kidsreads said the book "deserves a spot alongside many well-loved children's books. It's that good." A reviewer of The Trades website called it "an entertaining read that manages to serve several purposes in one concise novel" and found the characters "unusual yet likable", but felt that "the disappointing bit of this novel is that the solutions always arrive through a series of disconnected events that just lead the kids to think in certain ways." Kadon Enterprises, a game puzzle company, reviewed the book, praising the writing style and puzzles.

=== Awards ===
Award	Year	Result
Chicago Tribune Prize for Young Adult fiction	2004	Won
Great Lakes Book Award for Children's Chapter Book	2004	Won
Borders Original Voices Award	2004	Nominated
2005 Book Sense Book of the Year Award for children's literature	2005	Won
Edgar Award for Best Juvenile mystery novel	2005	Won
Agatha Award for Best Children's/Young Adult Novel	2005	Won
Indian Paintbrush Book Award	2006	Nominated

== Film ==
Warner Brothers bought the rights to a film of Chasing Vermeer in June 2004 and Brad Pitt's production company Plan B Entertainment planned to produce it. P.J. Hogan was slated as director and the novel was adapted by Matt Nix. However, when asked about the film in August 2010, Balliett answered,

"It’s been fascinating, watching this whole process, because Plan B did a wonderful job. They went through two screenwriters, and they’ve gone through two directors. It’s sort of like a house of cards. I have rights again. If they get it all together again, they’ll jump on it. But they don’t have exclusive rights anymore."
