= The Calder Game =

Book by Blue Balliett

- Front cover, designed by Brett Helquist
- Author: Blue Balliett
- Illustrator: Brett Helquist
- Cover artist: Brett Helquist
- Language: English
- Genre: Children's mystery novel
- Published: May 1, 2008 Scholastic Press
- Publication place: United States
- Media type: Print (hardback & paperback)
- Pages: 379 pgs.
- ISBN: 0-439-85207-2
- OCLC: 171287569
- LC Class: PZ7.B2128 Cal 2008
- Preceded by: The Wright 3

The Calder Game is a children's novel written by Blue Balliett and illustrated by Brett Helquist, published in 2008. It is the sequel to The Wright 3, which in turn is the sequel to Chasing Vermeer. Some underlying themes include the art of Alexander Calder, pentominoes, and the freedom of public art.

Calder, Petra, and Tommy next appeared in Balliett’s book Pieces and Players, published in 2015.

== Plot overview ==
Calder Pillay travels with his father to Woodstock, Oxfordshire and becomes interested in an unexpected Alexander Calder sculpture (who coincidentally is his namesake) in the town square. On the same night, both Calder and the sculpture disappear. His friends Petra and Tommy fly to England to aid his father in finding him.

== Critical reception ==
The Calder Game received mainly positive reviews. School Library Journal called it "every bit as intricate, engaging, and delightful" as its two precursors and praised the structure of the novel. Publishers Weekly was positive and wrote that it was "an ambitious novel". BookPage's Alice Cary praised the pacing and intriguing questions. The website Kidsreads.com claimed that The Calder Game is "Balliett's best work of fiction yet".

However, Kirkus Reviews felt that The Calder Game "falls short of Chasing Vermeer's brilliance" and it was marred by a "problematic construction and too many tidy dei ex machinis".
