= Unidentified Suburban Object =

- Author: Mike Jung
- Genre: Juvenile fiction
- Publisher: Scholastic
- Publication date: 2016
- Publication place: United States
- Pages: 272
- Awards: Texas Bluebonnet Award Nominee
- ISBN: 978-0-545-78226-5

Unidentified Suburban Object is a 2016 middle-grade fiction novel written by Mike Jung. It was published in May 2016, by Arthur A. Levine Books, an imprint of Scholastic Inc.

== Background ==
Mike Jung co-founded the We Need Diverse Books movement, which prompted him to explore his own culture through his writing. He was also inspired to create strong female characters after the birth of his daughter. Jung was inspired by science fiction stories and comic books.

== Synopsis ==
Despite being the only Korean girl at her school, Chloe Cho is desperate to get in touch with her family roots. As there are not many Korean people in the town, Chloe and her best friend, Shelley, turn to internet blogs to learn about Korean culture. Whenever Chloe makes traditional Korean food or wears traditional Korean clothes, her parents change the topic of their conversation or pretends not to know about what she is talking about. Chloe nearly gives up on asking her parents about their past when the new Korean teacher at her school, Ms. Su-Hyung Lee, assigns her students to interview someone in their family about an old family story. Through persistence and hard work, Chloe finally convinces her parents to tell something about their past, but it is not what she expected. Instead of feeling like she finally knows who she is, Chloe feels more alone than ever. After finding herself in this new situation, Chloe realizes more what it really means to be who she is.

== Themes ==
=== Racism & stereotyping ===
Aimee Rogers of KidsReads stated that Chloe's being "different" from everyone in her town came from their treating her differently. She further noted that, though most of the citizens of Primrose Heights seemed well, their stereotyping and racially-inclined assumptions turned out to be blatant racism.

"Chloe's life teems with microaggressions: a hanbok she wears is called "exotic", strangers assume she is Chinese or Japanese, and a well-meaning orchestra teacher calls her "my Abigail Yang", a famous Korean violin virtuoso." —Publishers Weekly

== Reception ==
Unidentified Suburban Object was reviewed by Common Sense Media, who rated it at four out of five stars with the summary, "Quirky take on identity is surprising and funny". The Bulletin of the Center for Children's Books also posted a review, stating that "While Chloe’s anger—about the subtle but constant racism, her parents’ vagueness, and the revelation that she isn’t even human—is believable, Chloe vents her feelings in ways erratic, unproductive, and alienating (no pun intended) that make it difficult to bond with her as a character." The Michigan Reading Journal wrote, "while some of Chloe’s concerns might seem trite and exaggerated to adult readers, her worries about how others see her will ring true to many adolescents."

=== Awards and honors ===
| Year | Award | Result |
|---|---|---|
| 2017 | 2017–2018 Texas Bluebonnet Award | Won |
| 2020 | CCBC Choices Award | Nominated |
