= Brett Helquist =

American illustrator and artist (born 1965)

Brett L. Helquist (born November 1965) is an American illustrator best known for his work in the children's book series A Series of Unfortunate Events. As such, his illustrations for that series have appeared in multiple media, including the books, the audio book covers, and the calendars. Helquist graduated from Brigham Young University (BYU) with a BFA in illustration in 1993. After graduation, he moved to New York City where he worked full-time as a graphic designer, occasionally drawing for newspapers and magazines. Helquist's work has been featured in children's magazines, along with The New York Times. He has illustrated almost 50 books.

== Biography ==
Helquist was born in Ganado, Arizona, in 1965, and grew up in Orem, Utah, with his six sisters. His love of art and his desire to become an illustrator came from reading comic strips in newspapers as a child. Helquist served as a missionary for The Church of Jesus Christ of Latter-day Saints in Hong Kong, then earned a bachelor's degree in fine arts from Brigham Young University in 1993. Prior to entering the illustration program at BYU, Helquist studied as an engineering student. He took a year off during his time as a student to take a job in Taiwan where he illustrated a textbook. This experience helped him make the decision to switch to illustration and the visual arts. From there, he worked closely with Utah artist and BYU professor of illustration Robert Barrett.

Helquist has lived in New York City since 1993. Immediately after graduating from BYU, Helquist was an intern for illustrator Robert Neubecker. For six years, he worked as a graphic designer, drawing for magazines and newspapers in his spare time. He has been published in the children's magazine Cricket, and in The New York Times. He is represented by Steven Malk of Writers House in New York City.

In 2011, it was announced that Helquist would be producing images for a new edition of the Scary Stories to Tell in the Dark series by Alvin Schwartz.

In August 2017, Helquist donated several boxes filled with early sketches of his illustrations for A Series of Unfortunate Events to BYU's Special Collections department. These sketches were displayed at BYU until the end of September 2017.

In February 2019, Helquist was the Artist Guest of Honor and Keynote Speaker at the 37th annual Life, the Universe, & Everything science fiction and fantasy arts symposium.

In 2024, The Mona Lisa Vanishes: A Legendary Painter, a Shocking Heist, and the Birth of a Global Celebrity, which Helquist illustrated, won the Sibert Medal.

== Works ==
Besides the 13 A Series of Unfortunate Events books, Helquist has provided illustrations for nearly 50 books, varying from children's books to young adult novels.

=== Children's books ===
- Milly and the Macy's Parade (2001), ISBN 0-439-29754-0
- A Christmas Carol (2009), ISBN 0-061-65099-4
- The Three Musketeers (2011), ISBN 0-062-06013-9
- The Fort That Jack Built (2013), ISBN 1-419-70795-7
- Groundhog's Day Off (2015), ISBN 1-619-63289-6
- Bear's Big Breakfast (2016), ISBN 0-062-26455-9
- Martina & Chrissie: The Greatest Rivalry in the History of Sports (2017), ISBN 0-763-67308-0
- The Nutcracker Mice (2017), ISBN 0-763-68519-4

=== Middle grade books ===
- Smith (2000), ISBN 0-374-46762-5
- The Beejum Book (2002), ISBN 0-880-10505-4
- Brainboy and the Deathmaster (2003), ISBN 0-060-29181-8
- Books in the Tales from the House of Bunnicula series by James Howe:
  - It Came from Beneath the Bed! (2003), ISBN 0-689-83948-0
  - Invasion of the Mind Swappers from Asteroid 6! (2003), ISBN 0-689-83950-2
  - Howie Monroe and the Doghouse of Doom (2003), ISBN 0-689-83952-9
  - Screaming Mummies of the Pharaoh's Tomb II (2004), ISBN 0-689-83953-7
  - Bud Barkin, Private Eye (2004), ISBN 0-689-86989-4
  - The Odorous Adventures of Stinky Dog (2004), ISBN 0-689-87412-X
- The Revenge of Randal Reese-Rat (2004), ISBN 0-06-050867-1
- Books in the Chasing Vermeer series by Blue Balliett:
  - Chasing Vermeer (2004), ISBN 0-439-37294-1
  - The Wright 3 (2006), ISBN 0-439-69367-5
  - The Calder Game (2008), ISBN 0-439-85207-2
  - Pieces and Players (2015), ISBN 0-545-29991-8
- Fly by Night (2005), ISBN 1-4050-2078-4
- Capt. Hook: Adventures of a Notorious Youth (2005), ISBN 0-060-00221-2
- The Spoon in the Bathroom Wall (2006), ISBN 0-152-05625-4
- Listening for Lions (2006), ISBN 0-06-058176-X
- Odd and the Frost Giants (2009), ISBN 0-061-67173-8
- Guys Read: Thriller (2011), ISBN 0-061-96375-5
- The Rise and Fall of Mount Majestic (2011), ISBN 0-142-41934-6
- The Storm Makers (2013), ISBN 0-316-17959-0
- Books in The Vengekeep Prophecies series by Brian Farrey:
  - The Vengekeep Prophecies (2013), ISBN 0-062-04929-1
  - The Shadowhand Covenant (2014), ISBN 0-062-04932-1
  - The Grimjinx Rebellion (2015), ISBN 0-062-04935-6
- Books in The League of Seven series by Alan Gratz:
  - The League of Seven (2015), ISBN 0-765-33825-4
  - The Dragon Lantern (2016), ISBN 0-765-33826-2
  - The Monster War (2016), ISBN 0-765-33824-6
- Books in the Myrtle Hardcastle Mystery series by Elizabeth C. Bunce:
  - Premeditated Myrtle (2020), ISBN 1-643-75187-5
  - How to Get Away with Myrtle (2020), ISBN 1-643-75188-3
  - Cold-Blooded Myrtle (2021), ISBN 1-643-75306-1
  - In Myrtle Peril (2022), ISBN 1-616-20921-6
  - Myrtle, Means, and Opportunity (2023), ISBN 1-643-75314-2

=== Young adult books ===
- The Strange Affair of Adelaide Harris (2001), ISBN 0-374-37277-2
- The Floating Island (The Lost Journals of Ven Polypheme) (2006), ISBN 0-765-30867-3

Helquist produced new cover illustrations for a reprint of the 1954–1976 Green Knowe series by Lucy M. Boston (Harcourt, 2002; retaining the original interior illustrations by the writer's son Peter Boston):

- The Children of Green Knowe, ISBN 0-15-202468-9
- The Treasure of Green Knowe, ISBN 0-15-202601-0 (a.k.a. The Chimneys of Green Knowe)
- The River at Green Knowe, ISBN 0-15-202607-X
- A Stranger at Green Knowe, ISBN 0-15-202589-8
- An Enemy at Green Knowe, ISBN 0-15-202481-6
- The Stones of Green Knowe, ISBN 0-15-205566-5

He also produced new illustrations for a reprint of the 1981–1991 Scary Stories to Tell in the Dark series by Alvin Schwartz (Harper & Row, 2011):

- Scary Stories to Tell in the Dark, ISBN 978-0-397-31927-5
- More Scary Stories to Tell in the Dark, ISBN 978-0-8124-4914-3
- Scary Stories 3: More Tales to Chill Your Bones, ISBN 978-0-7607-3418-6

Helquist also wrote and illustrated Roger, the Jolly Pirate, ISBN 0-06-623805-6, published in 2004; Bedtime for Bear, ISBN 0-060-50205-3, published in 2010; and Grumpy Goat, ISBN 0-061-13953-X, published in 2013.
