= Whitney Balliett =

American music journalist and author (1926–2007)

- Born: Whitney Lyon Balliett; April 17, 1926; Manhattan, New York City, U.S.
- Died: February 1, 2007 (aged 80); Manhattan, New York City, U.S.
- Education: Phillips Exeter Academy; Cornell University
- Occupations: Jazz critic and book reviewer
- Notable credit: The New Yorker
- Children: 5, including Blue Balliett

Whitney Lyon Balliett (April 17, 1926 – February 1, 2007) was a jazz critic and book reviewer for The New Yorker, which he wrote for from 1954 until 2001.

== Biography ==
Balliett was born in Manhattan and was raised in Glen Cove, New York, on Long Island. He attended Phillips Exeter Academy, where he learned to play drums in a band he summed up as "baggy Dixieland"; he played summer gigs at a Center Island yacht club.

He was drafted into the Army in 1946, interrupting his freshman year at Cornell University, to which he returned to finish his degree in 1951 and where he was a member of Delta Phi fraternity. He then took a job at The New Yorker, where he was hired by Katherine White, one of the magazine's fiction editors. He went on to write more than 550 signed pieces for The New Yorker, as well as many anonymous pieces.

The New York Review of Books published a few articles by Balliett between 1998 and 2003.

Acclaimed for his literary writing style, Balliett died at his Manhattan home on February 1, 2007, aged 80, from liver cancer. He was survived by his second wife, Nancy Balliett, and his five children (from both marriages): James Fargo Balliett, Blue Balliett, Will Balliett, Julie Lyon Rose, and Whitney Lyon Balliett Jr.

== Bibliography ==
=== Books ===
- The sound of surprise : 46 pieces on jazz. 1960.
- Dinosaurs in the morning : 41 pieces on jazz. 1962.
- Such Sweet Thunder: 49 Pieces on Jazz, 1966, Bobbs-Merrill Company
- Super-drummer: A Profile of Buddy Rich, 1968
- Ecstasy at the Onion: 31 Pieces on Jazz, 1971
- Alec Wilder and His Friends, 1974, Houghton Mifflin
- New York Notes: A Journal of Jazz, 1972-1975, 1976, Houghton Mifflin
- Improvising: Sixteen Jazz Musicians and Their Art, 1977, Oxford University Press
- American Singers, 1979, Oxford University Press
- Night Creature: A Journal of Jazz 1975-1980, 1981, Oxford University Press
- Jelly Roll, Jabbo, and Fats: 19 Portraits in Jazz, 1983, Oxford University Press
- American Musicians: Fifty-Six Portraits in Jazz, 1986, Oxford University Press
- American Singers: Twenty-seven Portraits in Song, 1988, Oxford University Press
- Barney, Bradley, and Max: Sixteen Portraits in Jazz, 1989, Oxford University Press
- Goodbyes and Other Messages: A Journal of Jazz, 1981-1990, 1991, Oxford University Press
- American Musicians II: Seventy-one Portraits in Jazz, 1996, Oxford University Press
- Collected Works: A Journal of Jazz 1954-2000, 2000, St. Martin's Press
- New York Voices: Fourteen Portraits, 2006, University Press of Mississippi

=== Essays and reporting ===
- "John Gordon's Folk Art: A Great Flowering of Free Spirits", The New Yorker, February 3, 1973.
- "A quality that lets you in". Profiles. The New Yorker. 49 (46): 33–38, 40, 42–43. January 7, 1974.
- "Coming Out Again" (on Anita Ellis), The New Yorker, July 31, 1978.

=== Book reviews ===
Year	Review article	Work(s) reviewed
1985	Balliett, Whitney (January 14, 1985). "No and yes". The New Yorker. 60 (48): 116–117.	Young Hearts Crying by Richard Yates; Scandal, or Priscilla's Kindness by A. N. Wilson

=== Balliett's life and work ===
- Gopnik, Adam (February 12, 2007). "Whitney Balliett". The Talk of the Town. Postscript. The New Yorker. 82 (49): 31.
