= Blue Balliett =

American author

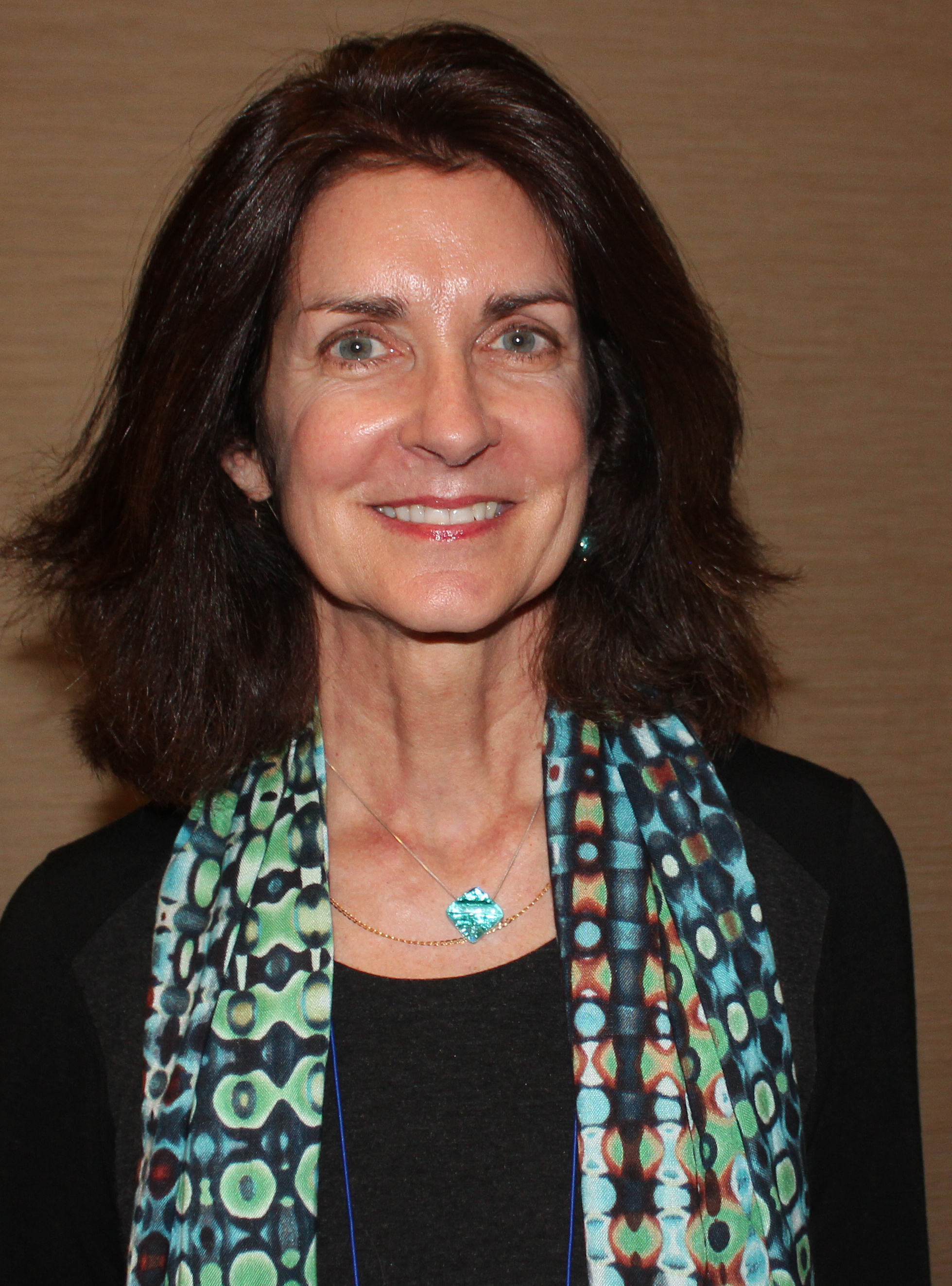
- Balliett in 2015
- Born: Elizabeth Balliett
- Occupation: Author
- Children: 3
- Writing career
- Notable works: Chasing Vermeer (2004); The Wright 3 (2006); The Calder Game (2008)
- Notable awards: Agatha Award (2004); Edgar Award (2005)

Blue Balliett is an American author. She is best known for her award-winning children’s novel, Chasing Vermeer.

Chasing Vermeer, released by Scholastic Press in 2004, is her best-known and most highly praised book. Illustrated by Brett Helquist, it concerns the fictitious theft of a painting by 17th-century Dutch artist Jan Vermeer. The book was a bestseller and won a number of accolades and awards, including the 2005 Edgar Award in the Best Juvenile category. In addition, she was awarded the Agatha Award in 2004 in the category Best Children's or Young Adult.

A sequel, The Wright 3, was released in April 2006, and a third, The Calder Game, was published two years later, in April 2008. The Danger Box was published in August 2010. Her next book, Hold Fast was published in 2013. Soon after, in 2015, Balliett published Pieces and Players. Out of the Wild Night was published in 2018. Balliett has also published two oral histories involving Nantucket ghost stories in the 1980s, which have been consolidated into one book, "Nantucket Ghosts" released by Down East Books in 2006.

== Personal life ==
Balliett was born to Elizabeth Platt and Whitney Balliett. She was born Elizabeth Balliett, but her mother started calling her Blue shortly after her birth.

Before releasing Chasing Vermeer, she taught third grade at the University of Chicago Laboratory Schools. During her tenure, she coordinated with NASA astronaut and University of Chicago alumnus John M. Grunsfeld (S.M., '84, Ph.D., '88) to send her pupils' literature and creative artwork into space during a routine Hubble Space Telescope mission on the Columbia space shuttle.

Balliett lives with her husband, three children, a grandson, and a cat.

== Bibliography ==
- Chasing Vermeer (2004)
- The Wright 3 (2006)
- The Calder Game (2008)
- The Danger Box (2010)
- Hold Fast (2013)
- Pieces and Players (2015)
- Out of the Wild Night (2018)
