= KidsReads =

KidsReads is a website, designed for children aged 6–12, containing information about children's books and authors, and some related games. The website was founded in 1996 by Carol Fitsgerald. As of 2009, Kidsreads.com had a following of over 350,000 readers each month. Its mascot is a worm named Booker T. Worm.

The website received an A+ rating from Education World, an independent online research source for educators, in all areas from content to aesthetics and organization. The organization described the site as "...an excellent resource and stimulus for readers in the elementary grades - offering lots of exciting information about authors and covers books from the classic to brand-new titles".
