= Austin Clarke (novelist) =

Barbadian writer (1934–2016)

Austin Clarke CM OOnt
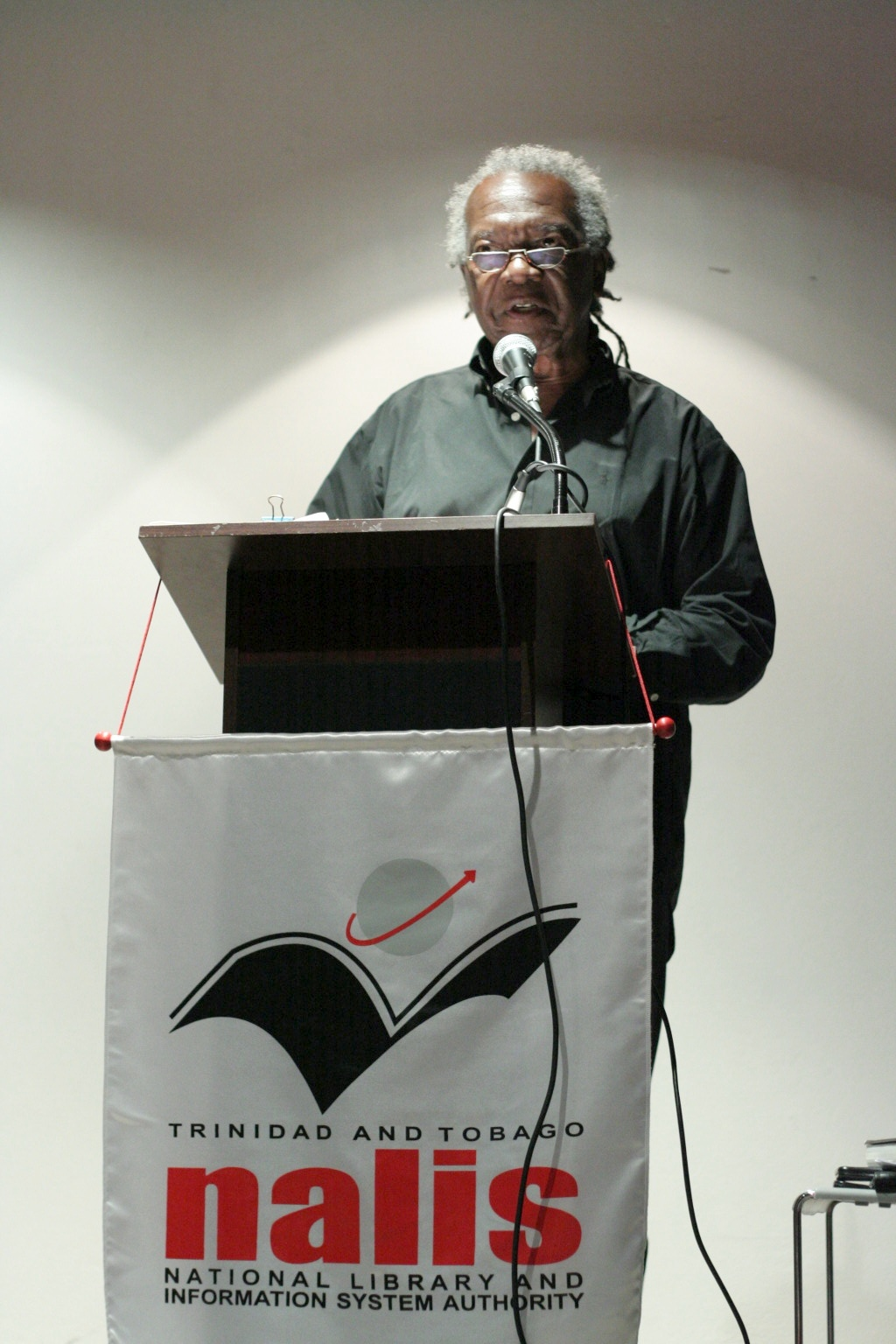
- Born: Austin Ardinel Chesterfield Clarke; July 26, 1934; St. James, Barbados
- Died: June 26, 2016 (aged 81); Toronto, Ontario, Canada
- Education: Trinity College, Toronto
- Occupations: Novelist; short story writer; essayist
- Writing career
- Period: 1960s–2016
- Notable work: The Polished Hoe (2002)

Austin Ardinel Chesterfield "Tom" Clarke, CM OOnt (July 26, 1934 – June 26, 2016), was a Barbadian novelist, essayist, and short story writer who was based in Toronto, Ontario, Canada. Among his notable books are novels such as The Polished Hoe (2002), memoirs including Membering (2015), and two collections of poetry, Where the Sun Shines Best (2013) and In Your Crib (2015).

== Early life and education ==
Austin Clarke was born in 1934 in St. James, Barbados, where he received his early education in Anglican schools. He taught at a rural school for three years. In 1955, he moved to Canada and attended the University of Toronto's Trinity College for two years.

== Career ==
Clarke was a reporter at the Timmins Daily Press and the Globe and Mail, before joining the Canadian Broadcasting Corporation as a freelance journalist. He subsequently taught at several American universities, including Yale University (Hoyt fellow, 1968–1970), Duke University (1971–1972), and the University of Texas (Visiting Professor, 1973) and helped establish black studies programs at several universities.

In 1973, he was designated cultural attaché at the Barbadian embassy in Washington, DC, and later became General Manager of the Caribbean Broadcasting Corporation in Barbados (1975–1977). He was Writer-in-Residence at Concordia University, Montreal, Quebec (1977), and at the University of Western Ontario (1978). He became a Canadian citizen in 1981. From 1988 to 1993, he served on the Immigration and Refugee Board of Canada.

He was not the first Canadian writer of African origin with that distinction belonging to 19th-century author Amelia E. Johnson. However, George Elliott Clarke says that Clarke was "the author of African descent in English, in Canada, that anyone who was interested in being a writer would have to be aware of and challenge as well." In September 2012, at the International Festival of Authors, Clarke was announced as the winner of the $10,000 Harbourfront Festival Prize "on the merits of his published work and efforts in fostering literary talent in new and aspiring writers". Previous recipients of the award (established in 1984) include: Dionne Brand, Wayson Choy, Christopher Dewdney, Helen Humphreys, Paul Quarrington, Peter Robinson, Seth, Jane Urquhart, and Guy Vanderhaeghe. Clarke was reported as saying: "I rejoiced when I saw that Authors at Harbourfront Centre had named me this year's winner of the Harbourfront Festival Prize. I did not come to this city on September 29, 1959, as a writer. I came as a student. However, my career as a writer buried any contention of being a scholar and I thank Authors at Harbourfront Centre for saving me from the more painful life of the "gradual student". It is an honour to be part of such a prestigious list of authors."

An outspoken intellectual, he avoided talking about multiculturalism, hoping that his own term 'omniculturalism' could be accepted by people from both the political left and right. He ran as a Progressive Conservative candidate in the 1977 Ontario general election.

Clarke died on June 26, 2016, at the age of 81, in Toronto.

== Selected awards and honours ==
- 1980, Casa de las Américas Prize, Cuba
- 1992, Toronto Arts Award for Lifetime Achievement in Literature
- 1997, Lifetime Achievement Award from Frontier College in Toronto
- 1998, Member of the Order of Canada.
- 1999, Martin Luther King Jr. Achievement Award for Excellence in Writing.
- 1999, W. O. Mitchell Literary Prize
- 2002, Giller Prize, for The Polished Hoe
- 2003, Commonwealth Writers' Prize
- 2009, Toronto Book Award, for More.
- 2012, Harbourfront Festival Prize

== Bibliography ==
=== Novels ===
- The Survivors of the Crossing (Toronto: McClelland & Stewart, 1964)
- Amongst Thistles and Thorns (Toronto: McClelland & Stewart, 1965)
- The Meeting Point (Toronto: Macmillan, 1967; Boston: Little, Brown, 1972)
- Storm of Fortune (Boston: Little, Brown, 1973)
- The Bigger Light (Boston: Little, Brown, 1975)
- The Prime Minister (Don Mills, Ont.: General Publishing, 1977)
- Proud Empires (London: Gollancz, 1986; Penguin-Viking, 1988, ISBN 978-0670817566)
- The Origin of Waves (McClelland & Stewart, 1997; winner of the Rogers Writers' Trust Fiction Prize)
- The Question (Toronto: McClelland & Stewart, 1999; nominated for a Governor General's Award)
- The Polished Hoe (Toronto: Thomas Allen, 2002; winner of the Giller Prize and the Commonwealth Writers' Prize)
- More (2008, winner of the City of Toronto Book Award)

=== Short story collections ===
- When He Was Free and Young and He Used to Wear Silks (Toronto: Anansi, 1971; revised edition Little, Brown, 1973)
- When Women Rule (Toronto: McClelland & Stewart, 1985)
- Nine Men Who Laughed (Toronto: McClelland & Stewart, 1986)
- In This City (Toronto: Exile Editions, 1992)
- There Are No Elders (Toronto: Exile Editions, 1993)
- The Austin Clarke Reader, ed. Barry Callaghan (Toronto: Exile Editions, 1996)
- Choosing His Coffin: The Best Stories of Austin Clarke (Toronto: Thomas Allen, 2003)
- They Never Told Me: and Other Stories (Holstein, ON: Exile Editions, 2013)
- Canadian Experience (Toronto: Exile Editions, 1994)

=== Poetry ===
- Where the Sun Shines Best (Toronto: Guernica Editions, 2013)
- In Your Crib (Toronto: Guernica Editions, 2015)

=== Memoirs ===
- Growing Up Stupid Under the Union Jack: a Memoir (Toronto: McClelland & Stewart, 1980; Thomas Allen, 2005, ISBN 978-0887621888)
- "A Stranger In A Strange Land", The Globe and Mail, Toronto, 15 August 1990, p. 30.
- Public Enemies: Police Violence and Black Youth (Toronto: HarperCollins, 1992)
- A Passage Back Home: A Personal Reminiscence of Samuel Selvon (Toronto: Exile Editions, 1994)
- Pigtails 'n Breadfruit: A Culinary Memoir (New Press, 1999); as Pigtails 'n' Breadfruit: The Rituals of Slave Food, A Barbadian Memoir (Toronto: Random House, 1999; University of Toronto Press, 2001); Pig Tails 'n' Breadfruit - Anniversary Edition (Ian Randle Publishers, 2014, ISBN 978-9766378820)
- Love and Sweet Food: A Culinary Memoir (Toronto: Thomas Allen, 2004; ISBN 978-0887621536)
- ′Membering (Toronto: Dundurn Press, 2015)
