= Shouldn't You Be in School? =

Book by Lemony Snicket

- The front cover of the U.S. edition of the novel.
- Author: Lemony Snicket (pen name of Daniel Handler)
- Illustrator: Seth
- Cover artist: Seth
- Language: English
- Series: All the Wrong Questions
- Genre: Mystery
- Publisher: Little, Brown and Company
- Publication date: September 30, 2014
- Publication place: United States
- Media type: Print, ebook
- Pages: 336 (first edition)
- ISBN: 978-0-316-12306-8 (Hardcover)
- Dewey Decimal: Fic 21
- Preceded by: When Did You See Her Last?
- Followed by: Why Is This Night Different From All Other Nights?

Shouldn't You Be in School? is the third book in Lemony Snicket's children's series All the Wrong Questions. The series features young apprentice Snicket, who is attempting to uncover the mystery behind a villain named Hangfire in Stain'd-by-the-Sea. The book was published on September 30, 2014, by Little, Brown and Company and features illustrations by Seth.

== Plot ==
S. Theodora Markson and her apprentice Lemony Snicket are hired to investigate a case of arson. Sharon Haines, an employee of the Department of Education informs Snicket of the fire, and becomes friends with Theodora. Sharon's son, Keller, acts suspiciously around Lemony. There is a witness to the arson, but when they go to visit his house, they discover it has also been burned down. Dashiell Qwerty, the town's librarian, is arrested for burning down the buildings, although Snicket highly doubts it was Qwerty that committed the crimes. It is revealed that Qwerty is arrested after Theodora and Sharon inform the Mitchum Officers that he is guilty. Stain'd Secondary School is then burned down, and all the schoolchildren are moved to the previously disused Wade Academy. Two people from the Department of Truancy come to take Snicket's friends (Jake Hix, Cleo Knight and Moxie Mallahan) plus Keller Haines to the boarding school, although Snicket is not taken. The man destroys Moxie's typewriter. Lemony realizes that the two people were Sharon and Hangfire.

When Lemony returns to the Lost Arms he finds Theodora beaten. She reveals that Sharon attacked her. Lemony finds Pip and Squeak hiding from the Department of Truancy. He goes to the school to investigate and is knocked unconscious by Stew Mitchum; however he wakes up in Ellington Feint's room in the school after she saved him and sneaked him inside. She pretends to be a student called Filene N. Gottlin (an anagram of her actual name). Lemony and Ellington meet with Moxie, Jake, Cleo, Keller and Ornette Lost (Prosper Lost's daughter) in the school library, though all the books are blank. It is revealed by Keller that he and his mother aided Hangfire in order to save his sister, Lizzie. Snicket comes up with a fragmentary plot and his friends all help to carry it out. Stew Mitchum and Hangfire warn Lemony that they will kill him if necessary before beating him up. Hangfire, the villain behind the arsons, attempts to mislead Snicket into thinking Dicey's Department Store is being burned down, but Snicket works out that he is planning to burn down the library. He removes the books before Hangfire can burn it down, although the building ends up being saved by the recently installed sprinkler system. Stew confronts Lemony and Ellington at the library, leading to Ellington being arrested for the destruction of the books. Lemony replaced the full books with the empty ones found at the school library. He then hides the full books at Black Cat Coffee. A younger Josephine then talks to Lemony about how his sister, Kit, was arrested.

== Reception ==
Ryan Britt gave the book a positive review, claiming that Snicket was "a little more dangerous and a little darker" than in previous books. Britt described the book as "a beautiful tune with sad words" and "charming", as well as pointing out the philosophical elements of the book.

The book was reviewed by Kirkus Reviews and described as a "smart, slyly humorous noir thriller" containing many literary allusions and "linguistic play".
