= The Great Northern Brotherhood of Canadian Cartoonists =

2011 graphic novel by Seth

- Cover of the first edition
- Date: 2011
- Page count: 138 pages
- Publisher: Drawn & Quarterly

Creative team
- Creator: Seth
- ISBN: 978-1-77046-053-9

Chronology
- Preceded by: George Sprott

The Great Northern Brotherhood of Canadian Cartoonists is a graphic novel by Canadian cartoonist Seth, published in October 2011 by Drawn & Quarterly. Like 2005's Wimbledon Green, The G.N.B. Double C was taken from Seth's sketchbooks. Seth describes it as a companion book and prequel to Green but its insistent "Canadianness" and lack of plot seem to place it more alongside another work of Seth's, George Sprott.

"The Great Northern Brotherhood of Canadian Cartoonists" referred to in the title is a fictional organization serving the Canadian comics community. Seth takes readers on a tour of "The G.N.B. Double C" building in the fictional town of Dominion, Ontario, and gives an overview of Canadian comics history along the way. This history, although mostly fictitious, does mention real cartoonists like Doug Wright, Jimmy Frise, Arch Dale, and Peter Whalley, all of whom were supposedly members of the Brotherhood. In Seth's alternate world, "Unlike other countries, Canadians (and their leaders) loved and supported cartooning".

== Publication history ==
Seth began working on The G.N.B. Double C before his 2005 graphic novel Wimbledon Green but became frustrated with it and abandoned the project before it was finished. Originally Seth intended this story to be a personal project and did not draw it with readers in mind so when Tom Devlin of Drawn & Quarterly suggested publishing it, he wasn't sure. Eventually Seth agreed but, because he wasn't happy with a lot of the book, redrew about two-thirds of it over a two-month period.

== Plot summary ==
The story opens with Seth walking down Milverton Street in Dominion, a fictional Ontario town Seth has used in other works, such as Clyde Fans. Located on this street is the local branch of the Great Northern Brotherhood of Canadian Cartoonists, a once proud institution now in decline. Seth takes readers on a tour of the building describing the Brotherhood's many prominent members and recounting the history of Canadian comics and their place in Canadian society. "Unlike other countries," he says, "Canadians (and their leaders) loved and supported cartooning".

The last stop on the tour is the roof. The door to the roof used to be left open but, after two members jumped off the roof, it's been kept locked. Seth looks down on the courtyard – the fountain is filled with garbage, the statue vandalized – and he admits that he exaggerated his account of history. Canadians never gave cartoonists any more respect than anyone else. Seth wonders if "this graphic novel thing" will catch on and hopes it will bring new members to the club.

== See also ==
- Canadian comics
