= Matt Cohen =

Matt Cohen may refer to:

- Matt Cohen (actor) (born 1982), American actor
- Matt Cohen (writer) (1942–1999), Canadian writer
- Matt Cohen Award, an award given annually by the Writers' Trust of Canada
