= Toronto International Festival of Authors =

Canadian literary festival

- Founded: 1974
- Type: Literary Arts
- Location: 235 Queens Quay West, Toronto, Ontario, Canada
- Key people: Director, Geoffrey E. Taylor; Board of Directors: A. Charles Baillie, President; Avie Bennett, President Emeritus; Harriet Lewis, Vice President & Secretary; Jeffrey Smyth, Treasurer; William Boyle; Rupert Duchesne; Karin Eaton; Beth Nowers
- Website: festivalofauthors.ca

The Toronto International Festival of Authors (TIFA), previously known as the International Festival of Authors (IFOA), is an annual festival presented in Toronto, Ontario, Canada.

== History ==
Since 1974, the mission of TIFA programming has been to promote interest and enthusiasm for writing and reading both locally and internationally, to showcase the excellence and variety of Canadian literature, and to introduce young readers to the possibilities of reading and writing. In addition, the organization offers programs and events for communities to increase the awareness of all forms of literature.

== Programming ==
TIFA programming runs throughout the year with several different categories for events. Each TIFA event is digitally recorded with photo, video and audio. Beginning in 2006, these recordings are sent to the holdings of the Library and Archives Canada. Such permanent documentation of IFOA’s extensive programming has allowed researchers and documentary makers extensive use of the archives.

=== TIFA Weekly Event Series ===
Running from September to June, the weekly event series includes authors taking part in events like readings, round table discussions, and interviews.

=== Toronto International Festival of Authors ===
The Toronto International Festival of Authors (TIFA), one of the most celebrated literary festivals in the world, was inaugurated in 1980 with a mandate to bring together the best writers of contemporary world literature. Like the weekly series, IFOA includes readings, interviews, round table discussions and talks, as well as public book signings and a festival bookstore. IFOA also continues to present readings by Scotiabank Giller Prize, Governor General’s Literary Award and Rogers Writers’ Trust Fiction Prize finalists, the Charles Taylor Prize for Literary Non-fiction recipient, and the awarding of the $10,000 Harbourfront Festival Prize.

=== Lit on Tour ===
Beginning in 2007, TIFA sought to grow their audience base by introducing the IFOA’s touring program, IFOA Ontario. This touring program visits communities in numerous cities and towns across Ontario. In 2010 IFOA Ontario featured 16 events in 14 towns and cities, from Windsor to Picton and Hamilton to Thunder Bay.

=== Book Bash ===
An integral part of TIFA, Book Bash, previously known as Young IFOA, was born as a way to include a younger generation of readers in a festival of international repute.

=== ALOUD: a Celebration for Young Readers ===
ALOUD: a Celebration for Young Readers was also introduced in 2005, featuring some of the world’s leading authors for young people. In 2010, ALOUD was incorporated as part of the Forest of Reading Festival of Trees.

In May 2007, TIFA hosted the first annual Forest of Reading Festival of Trees on the 10-acre Harbourfront Centre site. Now Canada’s largest children’s literary event, attracting 8,000 audience members annually, this action-packed festival celebrates the shared experience of reading through award ceremonies, workshops and activities. The Festival of Trees is presented with the Ontario Library Association.

== Harbourfront Festival Prize ==
Established in 1984, the Harbourfront Festival Prize ($10,000 CDN) was presented annually in recognition of an author's contribution to Canadian letters. It is based on the merits of their own published work and/or the time they have invested in nurturing the next generation of literary talent.

=== Past recipients ===
- 2019 Stuart Ross
- 2018 Lee Maracle
- 2017 Joseph Kertes
- 2016 Miriam Toews
- 2015 Avie Bennett
- 2014 Margaret MacMillan
- 2013 Alice Munro
- 2012 Austin Clarke
- 2011 Seth
- 2010 Peter Robinson
- 2009 Helen Humphreys
- 2008 Wayson Choy
- 2007 Christopher Dewdney
- 2006 Dionne Brand
- 2005 Guy Vanderhaeghe
- 2004 Jane Urquhart
- 2003 Linda Spalding
- 2002 Paul Quarrington
- 2001 Daniel David Moses
- 2000 Victor Coleman
- 1999 Matt Cohen
- 1998 Marty Gervais
- 1997 Ken Gass
- 1996 Timothy Findley
- 1995 Douglas George Fetherling
- 1994 M. G. Vassanji
- 1993 Graeme Gibson
- 1992 Alberto Manguel
- 1991 Nicole Brossard
- 1990 Howard Engel
- 1989 Tomson Highway
- 1988 Michael Ondaatje
- 1987 Barry Callaghan
- 1986 Margaret Atwood
- 1985 John Robert Colombo
- 1984 Dennis Lee

== Prize winners at Authors ==
=== Canadian awards ===
==== Scotiabank Giller Prize ====
Johanna Skibsrud, 2010
Linden MacIntyre, 2009
Joseph Boyden, 2008
Elizabeth Hay, 2007
Vincent Lam, 2006
David Bergen, 2005
Alice Munro, 2004
M.G. Vassanji, 2003, 1994
Austin Clarke, 2002
Richard B. Wright, 2001
Michael Ondaatje, 2000
David Adams Richards, 2000
Bonnie Burnard, 1999
Mordecai Richler, 1997
Margaret Atwood, 1996
Rohinton Mistry, 1995

==== Governor General's Literary Award for English Fiction ====
Dianne Warren, 2010
Kate Pullinger, 2009
Nino Ricci, 2008, 1990
Michael Ondaatje, 2007, 2000, 1992
Peter Behrens, 2006
David Gilmour, 2005
Miriam Toews, 2004
Douglas Glover, 2003
Gloria Sawai, 2002
Richard B. Wright, 2001
Matt Cohen, 1999
Diane Schoemperlen, 1998
Jane Urquhart, 1997
Guy Vanderhaeghe, 1996, 1982
Greg Hollingshead, 1995
Rudy Wiebe, 1994, 1973
Carol Shields, 1993
Rohinton Mistry, 1991
Paul Quarrington, 1989
David Adams Richards, 1988
M. T. Kelly, 1987
Alice Munro, 1986, 1978, 1968
Margaret Atwood, 1985
Josef Skvorecky, 1984
Leon Rooke, 1983
Mavis Gallant, 1981
George Bowering, 1980
Jack Hodgins, 1979
Timothy Findley, 1977
Marian Engel, 1976
Brian Moore, 1975, 1960
Robertson Davies, 1972
Mordecai Richler, 1971
Robert Kroetsch, 1969
Douglas LePan, 1964
Kildare Dobbs, 1961
Hugh MacLennan, 1959, 1948, 1945
Morley Callaghan, 1951

==== Charles Taylor Prize for Literary Non-Fiction ====
Ian Brown, 2010
Tim Cook, 2009
Richard Gwyn, 2008
Rudy Wiebe, 2007
J.B. MacKinnon, 2006
Charles Montgomery, 2005
Isabel Huggan, 2004
Carol Shields, 2002
Wayne Johnston, 2000

==== Rogers Writers' Trust Fiction Prize ====
Emma Donoghue, 2010
Annabel Lyon, 2009
Miriam Toews, 2008
Lawrence Hill, 2007
Kenneth J. Harvey, 2006
Joseph Boyden, 2005
Alice Munro, 2004
Kevin Patterson, 2003
Paulette Jiles, 2002
Helen Humphreys, 2000
Peter Oliva, 1999
Greg Hollingshead, 1998
Austin Clarke, 1997

=== International awards ===
==== Nobel Prize in Literature ====
Mario Vargas Llosa (Peru), 2010
Herta Müller (Romania. Germany), 2009
Jean-Marie Gustave Le Clézio (France), 2008
Doris Lessing (UK), 2007
Orhan Pamuk (Turkey), 2006
Harold Pinter (UK), 2005
J. M. Coetzee (South Africa), 2003
Seamus Heaney (Ireland), 1995
Kenzaburō Ōe (Japan), 1994
Toni Morrison (U.S.A.), 1993
Derek Walcott (St. Lucia), 1992
Nadine Gordimer (South Africa), 1991
Joseph Brodsky (Russia), 1987
Wole Soyinka (Nigeria), 1986
John Polanyi (Canada/Hungary), 1986 (Prize in Chemistry)
William Golding (UK), 1983
Czeslaw Milosz (U.S.A.), 1980
Saul Bellow (Canada/U.S.A.), 1976

==== Man Booker Prize ====
Howard Jacobson (UK), 2010
Hilary Mantel (UK), 2009
Anne Enright (Ireland), 2009
Aravind Adiga (India), 2008
Kiran Desai (India), 2006
John Banville (Ireland), 2005
Alan Hollinghurst (UK), 2004
Yann Martel (Canada), 2002
Peter Carey (Australia), 2001, 1988
Margaret Atwood (Canada), 2000
J. M. Coetzee (South Africa), 1999, 1983
Ian McEwan (UK), 1998
Graham Swift (UK), 1996
James Kelman (UK), 1994
Barry Unsworth (UK), 1992
Michael Ondaatje (Canada), 1992
Ben Okri (Nigeria), 1991
A.S. Byatt (UK), 1990
Kazuo Ishiguro (UK), 1989
Penelope Lively (UK), 1987
Keri Hulme (New Zealand), 1985
Thomas Keneally (Australia), 1982
Salman Rushdie (UK), 1981 (and in 1993 – Booker of Bookers)
Penelope Fitzgerald (UK), 1979
Nadine Gordimer (South Africa), 1974

==== Pulitzer Prize for Fiction ====
Paul Harding, 2010
Elizabeth Strout, 2009
Junot Díaz, 2008
Geraldine Brooks, 2006
Marilynne Robinson, 2005
Edward P. Jones, 2004
Jeffrey Eugenides, 2003
Richard Russo, 2002
Jhumpa Lahiri, 2000
Michael Cunningham, 1999
Richard Ford, 1996
Carol Shields, 1995
E. Annie Proulx, 1994
Robert Olen Butler, 1993
Jane Smiley, 1992
Oscar Hijuelos, 1990
Toni Morrison, 1988
Peter Taylor, 1987
Larry McMurty, 1986
Alison Lurie, 1985
William Kennedy, 1984
Alice Walker, 1983
John Cheever, 1979
Saul Bellow, 1976
Wallace Stegner, 1972
William Styron, 1968

==== International IMPAC Dublin Literary Award ====
Gerbrand Bakker (The Netherlands), 2010
Michael Thomas (USA), 2009
Rawi Hage (Canada), 2008
Per Petterson (Norway), 2007
Colm Tóibín (Ireland), 2006
Edward P. Jones (U.S.A.), 2005
Orhan Pamuk (Turkey), 2003
Alistair MacLeod (Canada), 2001
Andrew Miller (UK), 1999
Herta Müller (Germany), 1998
David Malouf (Australia), 1996

==== Orange Prize ====
Marilynne Robinson (USA), 2009
Rose Tremain (UK), 2008
Chimamanda Ngozi Adichie (Nigeria), 2007
Zadie Smith (UK), 2006
Andrea Levy (UK), 2004
Valerie Martin (U.S.A.), 2003
Kate Grenville (Australia), 2001
Carol Shields (U.S.A.), 1998
Anne Michaels (Canada), 1997
Helen Dunmore (UK), 1996

== Venues ==
- Fleck Dance Theatre
- Brigantine Room
- Studio Theatre
- Lakeside Terrace
- Concert Stage - outdoor concert venue
- Miss Lou's Room
