= The Polished Hoe =

2002 novel by Austin Clarke

- Author: Austin Clarke
- Language: English
- Publisher: Thomas Allen Publishers
- Publication date: 2002
- Publication place: Canada
- ISBN: 0-88762-110-4

The Polished Hoe is a novel by Barbadian writer Austin Clarke, published by Thomas Allen Publishers in 2002. It was the winner of the 2002 Scotiabank Giller Prize and the 2003 Commonwealth Writers' Prize for Canada and the Caribbean region and 2003 Trillium Book Award.

== Plot ==
The novel is a narrative by Mary-Mathilda (Miss Mary Gertrude Matilda Paul) of her confession of a crime. The events takes place in about twenty-four hours of span starting on a night in the 1950s post World War II era. She is a respected woman of the island of Barbados, popularly called "Bimshire." She goes to the police and encounters her old friend Percy, a police sergeant with whom she shares unrequited feelings. Mary-Mathilda confesses to murdering Mr. Belfeels, the owner of a sugar plantation, a rich man known for his arrogance towards the workers under him. Mary-Mathilda had been working as a field labourer, kitchen help and then as a maid and for many years has also been Belfeels' mistress. She has a son Wilberforce with Belfeels who becomes a doctor after being funded by his father. Her son returns to the island after his studies abroad. Belfeels lives with his wife and two daughters and keeps Mary-Mathilda in a house on the outskirts of plantation away from the town. Belfeels objectifies her and treats her ruthlessly on various occasions. On their first encounter, while she was quite young, he undresses her using a riding crop while her mother turns a blind eye. Due to this she develops a nausea of leather's smell. She also discovers a dark secret kept by her mother that she herself is Belfeels' daughter which shatters her and provokes her to eventually murder Belfeels.

== Publishing and development ==
The book is Clarke's tenth novel. He had also published five short story collections before this book. Clarke mentioned in an interview that he listened "very attentively" to American jazz trumpeter, bandleader, and composer Miles Davis while writing some of the sections of the novel. Clarke structured the novel in the form of short stories. The novel was published by Thomas Allen Publishers in November 2002.

Clarke mentioned that he was inspired by British poet and writer Geoffrey Chaucer's The Canterbury Tales, a collection of twenty-four stories that runs to over 17,000 lines written in Middle English and its "non-traditional" usage. He also noted that "[his] main concern was to find a language, or to more strictly use the language [he] already knew, in such a way that it become, in [his] manipulation of it, a new language." Clarke said that he intended to "creolize Oxford English".

One of the narratives of the novel is based on a real life incident in Clarke's life, which he describes as "first confrontations with racism". Clarke experienced racism while travelling from Barbados to Little England, Canada with the Trans-Canada Air Lines in September 1955. He narrated the incident as the journey told by Mary-Mathilda, the leading character of the novel, who is travelling from Miami to Buffalo. The novel was later translated into Dutch by publishing house, De Geus.

In 2005, when Clarke read De Inventione, an Italian handbook by Marcus Tullius Cicero, he noted that if he had known about it while writing the novel, "[he] might very well have drawn the characters of Mary-Mathilda; her son, Wilberforce; Sergeant; and the Constable; to say nothing of Mr. Bellfeels; in sharper poignancy and focus". In the handbook, Cicero mentions that "We hold the following to be the attributes of persons: name, nature, manner of life, fortune, habit, interests, purposes, achievements, accidents, conversation."

In September 2022, Dundurn Press released a twentieth anniversary edition of the novel with a foreword by Rinaldo Walcott.

== Reception and awards ==
The novel won the 2002 Scotiabank Giller Prize adjudged by Barbara Gowdy, Thomas King, and W. H. New while being shortlisted along with Mount Appetite (by Bill Gaston), The Navigator of New York (by Wayne Johnston), Open (by Lisa Moore), and Unless (by Carol Shields). It also won the 2003 Commonwealth Writers' Prize for Canada and the Caribbean region and 2003 Trillium Book Award.

Upon publication, the novel received mostly favourable reviews with some criticism. Kirkus Reviews appreciated the novel as "a memorable landscape of oppression but a problematic central figure". While Ihsan Taylor of The New York Times noted that "There's a mesmerizing stillness to Austin Clarke's latest novel", British writer Maya Jaggi mentions in her The Guardian review that the "[novel]'s meandering orality, its slow-burning power, succeed movingly in asserting memory over the silent gaps in recorded history." Another British novelist Naeem Murr criticised Clarke for losing confidence in his characters and for forcing them deliver sociological truths but appreciates the "brilliantly written dialogue". Craig Taylor in his Quill & Quire review called the novel as "a wonderful book to meander" and mentioned that "it adheres to the slow pace of the life it describes and allows characters room to become memorable." Jeffrey Brown of PBS noted in an interview with Clarke: "There is a mix in your book of a kind of... I would call it almost a high poetic language, a very formal language, and then a dialect, the way they would talk to each other."
