= It's a Good Life, If You Don't Weaken =

Graphic novel by Seth

- First edition cover, Drawn & Quarterly, 1996
- Creator: Seth
- Date: 1996
- Page count: 176 pages
- Publisher: Drawn & Quarterly

Original publication
- Published in: Palookaville
- Issues: 4–9
- Date of publication: 1993–1996

It's a Good Life, If You Don't Weaken is a graphic novel by Canadian cartoonist Seth. It appeared in a collected volume in 1996 after serialization from 1993 to 1996 in issues #4–9 of Seth's comic book series Palookaville. The mock-autobiographical story tells of its author's obsessive search for the work of a fictional forgotten cartoonist.

Seth presents the fictional book as a work of autobiography and features figures from his life such as his friend and fellow cartoonist Chester Brown. The minimalist artwork draws from the styles of the early New Yorker cartoonists, rendered in thick brushstrokes with heavy blacks against a greyish-blue wash. The story unfolds with a nostalgic and melancholic tone, and several wordless scenes take the reader on a tour of Southern Ontarian city- and landscapes. The book gained Seth a reputation as part of an autobiographical comics trend in the 1990s. It won two Ignatz Awards in 1997 and ranked No. 52 of The Comics Journal's "100 Best Comics of the 20th Century".

== Background ==
Seth, a cartoonist then based in Toronto, first drew attention to his work in 1985 when he took over art duties from the Hernandez brothers for Mister X from Toronto publisher Vortex Comics. In April 1991, he launched his own comic book, Palookaville, with Montreal publisher Drawn & Quarterly. By this time, Seth's artwork had evolved to a style inspired by The New Yorker cartoons of the 1930s and 1940s.

Self-revelatory autobiography was a prominent genre in alternative comics in the early 1990s, drawing influence from the works of Robert Crumb, Harvey Pekar, Art Spiegelman, and others of the earlier underground comix generation. Seth had focused on autobiographical stories since Palookaville débuted. Friends of his appeared in them, most prominently fellow Toronto-based cartoonists Chester Brown and Joe Matt, who also featured each other in their own autobiographical comics. Though a work of fiction, Seth presented It's a Good Life, If You Don't Weaken as another autobiographical story, an approach inspired in part by Lynda Barry, who mixed autobiography with fiction in her comics. Seth, Matt, and Brown shared a melancholy worldview and a self-deprecatory approach, though Seth showed far more restraint in the content of his work than the other two, whose comics revealed personal details such as their authors' masturbation habits.

== Synopsis ==
The story opens during Christmas 1986 in London, Ontario. Seth is a cartoonist obsessed with collecting cartoons and other items from bygone eras. He rants about the modern world and criticizes himself, in particular to his friend and fellow cartoonist Chester "Chet" Brown. While searching for information on cartoonist Whitney Darrow, Jr., Seth comes across a cartoon signed "Kalo" in The New Yorker. Fond of this older style of cartooning which resembles his own, Seth sets off to find more about this obscure cartoonist.

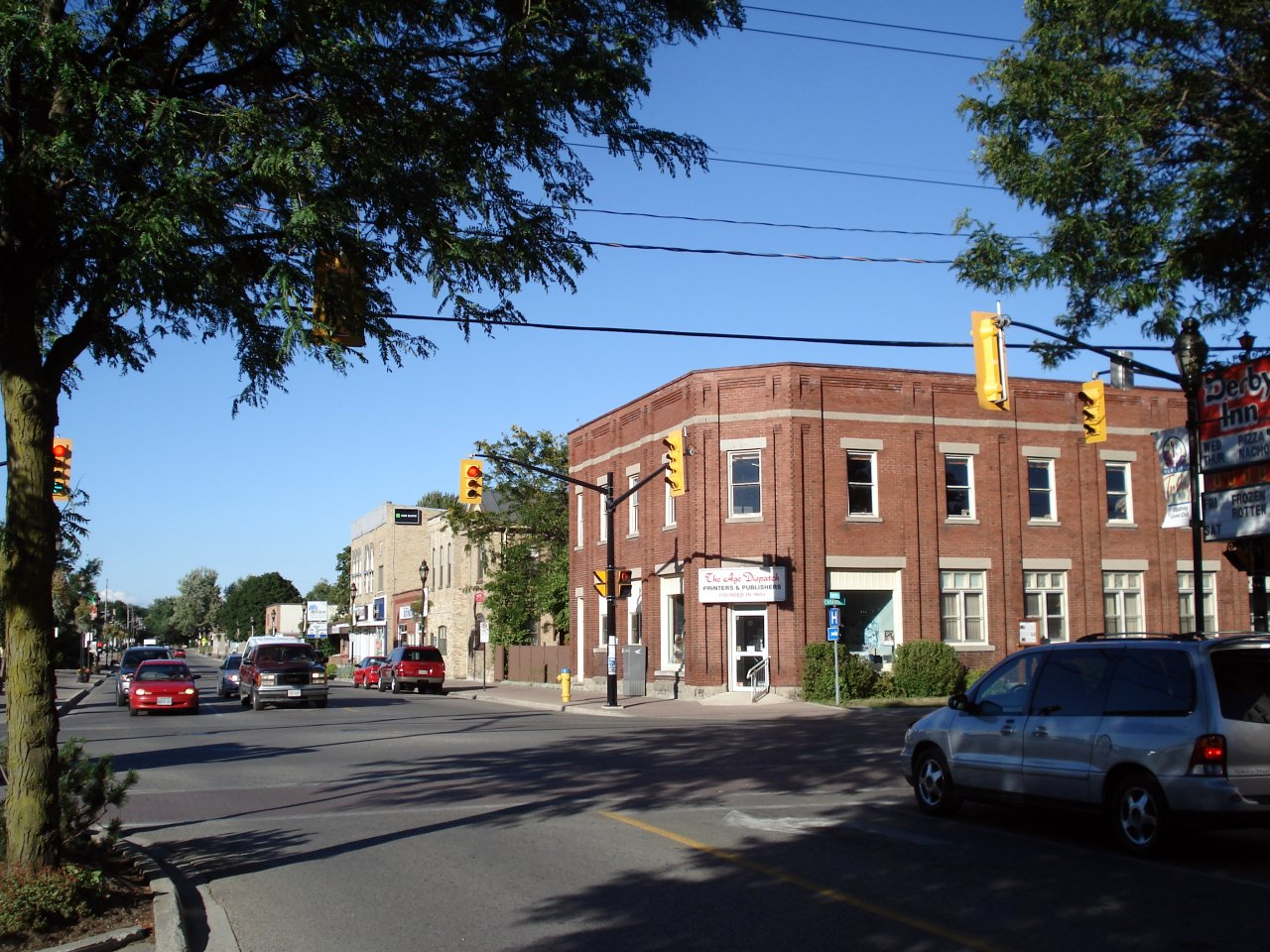
Seth discovers the cartoonist he is researching lived in his own hometown Strathroy.

Seth begins a relation with a woman named Ruthie, whom he first spots while conducting a search at the Toronto Reference Library. He remains self-absorbed and pays little attention to her interests, though she shows enthusiasm for his and discovers Kalo's real name—Jack Kalloway. Seth learns Kalo had spent his life in Seth's own childhood hometown of Strathroy in Southern Ontario; when he makes a visit there he refuses to allow Ruthie to accompany him, and a month later breaks off the relationship, to his later regret.

After two years of no progress Seth finds out that Kalo had run a real estate business in Strathroy that his daughter inherited on his death in 1979. He returns to Strathroy where he interviews Kalo's daughter and 93-year-old mother. He learns that Kalo spent years as a cartoonist in New York and gave up cartooning for real estate after returning to Strathroy and marrying. Kalo's mother had kept a collection of her son's work, but lost it when she moved to a nursing home. In the end, Seth has only the eleven cartoons he had found, which append the book.

== Publication ==
It's a Good Life, If You Don't Weaken was serialized in issues #4 (December 1993) through #9 (June 1996) of Seth's comic book Palookaville, published by Drawn & Quarterly. It appeared in collected form in September 1996 from the same publisher. Seth said his mother used the title phrase when he was growing up. On the cover, Seth labelled the work "a Picture-Novella"; this allowed him to avoid the term "graphic novel" and instead use "an antiquated-sounding term". He has used the term on all his later book-length works of fiction.

The book has been translated into a number of languages. A French edition appeared first in 1998, and then in an edition more faithful in production to the original English one—with blue wash on yellowed pages—and in a different translation in 2009. An Italian version followed in 2001. In 2004, editions appeared in German, Spanish, and Dutch. Editions appeared in Danish in 2010, Korean in 2012, Polish in 2014. and Serbian in 2017.

== Style and analysis ==
The story takes place in the 1980s and follows Seth, a cartoonist whose life revolves around cartooning and collecting nostalgic items. He feels ill-at-ease in the modern world and pines for bygone eras. His obsessions and cynicism alienate Seth from most of those around him.

By the time he began the serial, Seth had developed a style derivative of The New Yorker stylists of the 1930s and 1940s. In the book's appendix Seth describes Peter Arno as "possibly The New Yorker's greatest stylist". Seth appropriates the sophisticated, jaded satirical mood, thick brushline, and compositional sense of Arno's work. Seth's renders with a simple and organic brushline, and gives attention to buildings, landscapes, weather conditions, and other background details. giving fine attention to details of objects despite the stylized, iconic rendering. The brushstrokes broaden into thick black shadows, sometimes flattening figures to near-abstract silhouettes. A greyish-blue wash accents the otherwise black-and-white cartooning. The novel is printed on yellow paper, giving an aged feeling to the book.

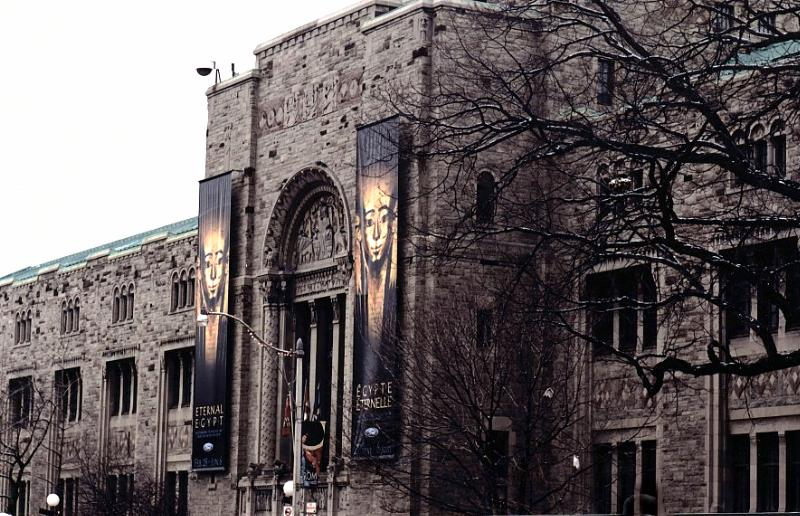
The art dwells on older buildings in Southern Ontario, as when Seth visits the Royal Ontario Museum in Toronto. Avenue Road entrance pictured

Several wordless scenes unfold in an atmospheric panning through landscapes and cityscapes, with a particular focus on older buildings. The third section opens with such a sequence—tangential to the plot—in the Royal Ontario Museum. The detail in the buildings is much greater than in the simplified delineation of the characters.

In a self-referential twist, the character of Seth at one point discusses his love of the New Yorker style with Chester Brown, while the story itself is drawn in such a manner. Brown expresses his appreciation for such cartoonists but disappoints Seth with his lack of enthusiasm. The cartoonist Kalo is fictional, though this is not revealed in the book. Seth produces the Kalo cartoons in a New Yorker style, yet distinct from the art in the rest of the book. Seth's use of a real person to comment on Kalo's work makes the fictional cartoonist's existence seem more plausible, as does an actual photograph on the final page purporting to be of Kalo.

Though it avoids sentimentalism, a strongly nostalgic and melancholic tone pervades the narrative as the Seth character searches for peace and meaning in his life. The narrative is presented as confessional and revelatory: it displays the protagonist's interpersonal problems and self-doubts, and at one point he is depicted as naked. He often talks of his obsession with the past—his own childhood and earlier eras—either through dialogue with friends or in captions as he wanders the streets. Seth's interpersonal encounters tend to be one-sided, revealing his reactions to and judgments of those around him. Critic Dominick Grace interprets the fictional Seth as an unreliable narrator whose comments often undercut his own imaginings of the past.

Seth navigates the city on foot—cars, bicycles, and public transportation rarely even appear–as he talks with friends or rifles through used book shops. For literary theorist Barbara Postema, the character fits the archetype of Walter Benjamin's flâneur—the wandering urban pedestrian out of touch with his own time and obsessed with the past. Seth pines for a past not his own and obsessively collects consumer items from earlier in the 20th century. His focus is primarily on the period from the 1930s to the 1950s, a time he feels particularly "Canadian". He goes as far as to wear an old-fashioned overcoat and broad-rimmed hat, for which passing teenagers taunt him, saying he looks like Clark Kent or Dick Tracy. He declares to Chester: "I do think life was simpler then ... easier for people to find personal happiness." Brown disagrees, saying, "I think it's always been difficult for people to be happy." Seth dreads the future and allows his memories of childhood to dominate his thoughts, but recognizes and criticizes his own obsessions: "There's something in the decay of old things that provokes an evocative sadness for the vanished past. If those buildings were perfectly preserved it wouldn't be the same." Despite this consciousness, he continues to pursue his collecting.

Photographs recur as a motif, such as family portraits in Kalo's scrapbooks or wedding shots in a diner on which the focus dwells. Another motif is an old apartment building, the image of which appears at moments when Seth questions his search for Kalo. For Postema, Kalo's neglected work is similarly "unpreserved, unnoticed, and left to decay".

A male-centred viewpoint dominated English-language comic books throughout the 20th century and, with few exceptions, placed women in subordinate roles as victims, helpers, or sex objects. To academic Katie Mullins, Seth's narrative viewpoint follows from this tradition, though the book superficially has little in common with the masculine adventuring generally associated with mainstream comic books. The author's female characters play peripheral roles, and the character's obsessive collecting and self-absorption alienate him from relationships with females, who at times encourage him to find meaning in life outside comics—advice he ignores. The book highlights the overwhelmingly masculine homosociality of the collector's world, which Seth hints at with the name of the "Book Brothers" book store the character frequents. In one panel, the store sign is obscured so that only "Book Brothe" is visible, suggesting a "Book Brothel", and thus evoking the fetishism inherent in collecting. The intelligent Ruthie provides a love interest that nevertheless manages only to feed Seth's self-absorption: he is attracted to her physically and also to her bookishness, but she takes second place in his life to his obsession with Kalo, whose real name she discovers for him. Seth finds he does not know her well enough to give a satisfactory answer to Chester's "So what's she like?" Whenever she leads the conversation to her own thoughts and interests, Seth changes the subject. She ends by leaving him.

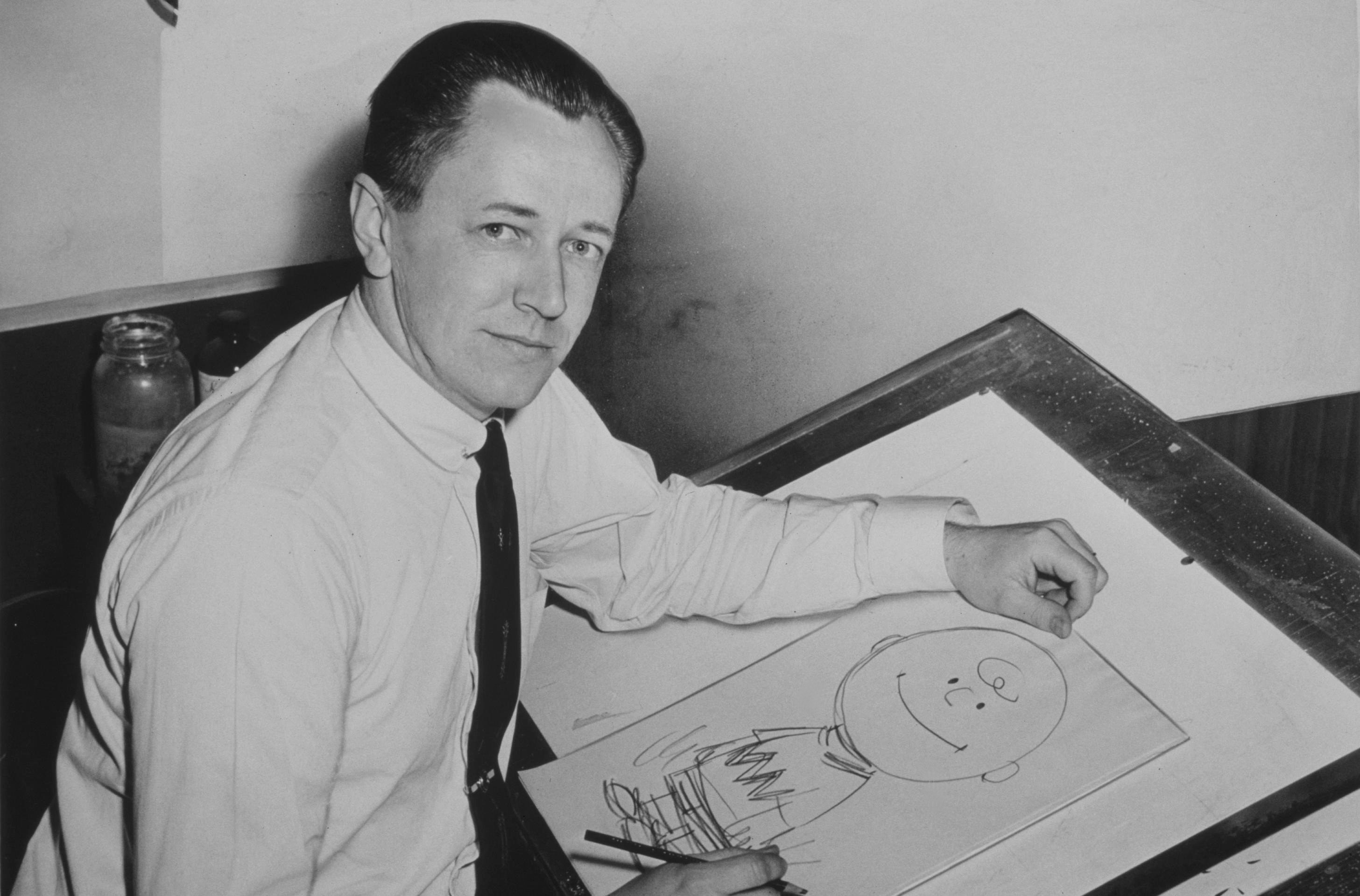
Seth references Charles M. Schulz's Peanuts comic strip, a primary influence

In every event and conversation, the protagonist draws parallels to something he has read in comics. He has a withdrawn personality averse to risk-taking; he declares himself a "true adherent of avoidism", and quotes the character Linus from Charles M. Schulz's comic strip Peanuts: "No problem is so big or so complicated that it can't be run away from." His mother's home, which he calls "sealed in amber" as it never changes, provides him a safe berth from the ever-changing modern world.

To comics scholar Bart Beaty, Kalo's giving up cartooning for familial duties provides the protagonist an opportunity to evaluate his own life: his failed romances, his obsessive collecting, and his relationship with his family—in particular his mother, whose home is an emotional safety zone for him. The Seth character declares, "I used to like to get inside cardboard boxes and close them up behind me. I enjoyed being in that safe, confined space. My mother's place is a lot like those boxes."

Seth finds it hard to understand the fact that the cartoonist he admires could give up a cartooning career and still find happiness in the last twenty years of his life; he come to accept it after a visit to Kalo's mother in a nursing home. He discovers that his Kalo collection may always remain incomplete—though the family once had a scrapbook filled with Kalo's cartoons, they long ago threw it away. By the end of the story, Seth has found a mere eleven of them. When Kalo's mother reveals Kalo's contentment with his choice to give up cartooning, Seth must face the anxiety of his life choices and what a "good life" may mean to him. As a mother who has outlived her son yet does not mire herself in the past, Mrs Kalloway provides an unsentimental contrast to how Seth views and deals with the world.

== Reception and legacy ==
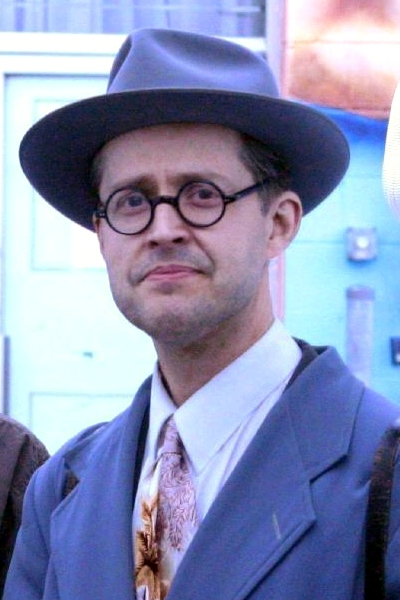
Seth in 2005

In the middle of its serialization, reviewer Kent Worcester called It's a Good Life, If You Don't Weaken "one of the very few essential exemplars of the potential of the medium". On its publication, It's a Good Life became a primary inspiration, after Art Spiegelman's Maus, on the cartoonist Chris Ware's efforts and thoughts on the potential for the graphic novel form.

The book won Seth two Ignatzes at the award's inaugural ceremony in 1997: one for Outstanding Artist and the other for Outstanding Graphic Novel or Collection. In 1999, the book placed No. 52 on The Comics Journal's "100 Best Comics of the 20th Century". The book appeared on GQ's "20 Graphic Novels You Should Read" list in 2009 and on the British journalist Rachel Cooke's list of ten best graphic novels. It ranked No. 16 on the Scottish Herald's "50 Greatest Graphic Novels of all Time" list in 2013 and No. 25 on Rolling Stone's list of the "50 Best Non-Superhero Graphic Novels" in 2014.

Since the book's publication, Seth has achieved a particularly high level of critical and popular recognition compared to other Canadian cartoonists. According to academic Nick Mount, it is "the first Canadian graphic novel to ... make the crossover from underground praise to mainstream praise". In 2005 he was the first cartoonist to have a solo exhibit at the Art Gallery of Ontario in Toronto. By 2006 It's a Good Life had sold 15,000 copies in English. A boom in comics memoirs followed the publication of It's a Good Life, and its success increased Drawn & Quarterly's reputation.

Seth has called Charles M. Schulz his primary influence; his reputation for design led in 2004 to Fantagraphics Books enlisting him as the designer for the Complete Peanuts. The New Yorker-obsessed Seth has managed to have his work published in The New Yorker itself, including the cover to the March 2004 issue.

Seth followed It's a Good Life with a similar work, the nostalgic and melancholic Clyde Fans, which was serialization in Palookaville from 1997 to 2017, and finally collected into one work in 2019. Palookaville 24 appeared in late 2023 after a six year hiatus. Seth has also published a number of stand-alone books.

The Canadian rock band The Tragically Hip titled a song after the book on its album In Violet Light, released in 2002.

== See also ==
- Chester Brown's autobiographical comics
