= Who Could That Be at This Hour? =

First book in the series All the Wrong Questions by Lemony Snicket

- Front cover of the U.S. first edition
- Author: Lemony Snicket (pen name of Daniel Handler)
- Illustrator: Seth
- Cover artist: Seth
- Language: English
- Series: All the Wrong Questions
- Genre: Mystery
- Publisher: Little, Brown and Company
- Publication date: October 23, 2012
- Publication place: United States
- Media type: Print, ebook, audiobook
- Pages: 258
- ISBN: 978-0-316-12308-2 (Hardcover)
- Dewey Decimal: Fic 21
- Followed by: When Did You See Her Last?

Who Could That Be at This Hour? is the first novel of the children's novel series All the Wrong Questions by Lemony Snicket, a series set before the events of A Series of Unfortunate Events. The novel tells the story of a young Lemony Snicket, who is apprenticing for the V.F.D. under the worst-ranked agent, S. Theodora Markson. The book was published on October 23, 2012, by Little, Brown and Company and illustrated by Seth.

== Plot ==
The novel begins with a cover sheet indicating a recipient named "Walleye", CCed to the V.F.D. headquarters.

The story begins in the Hemlock Tearoom and Stationery Shop, where a twelve-year-old Lemony Snicket escapes his current chaperones, who are masquerading as his parents, to apprentice under S. Theodora Markson, the 52nd ranked V.F.D. member on a list of 52. After learning that his current chaperones were trying to knock him out with tea laced with laudanum, Snicket escapes with Markson in a green roadster. They arrive at the mostly abandoned town of Stain'd-by-the-Sea, a once-great exporter of octopus ink that has fallen on hard times. It is here that they get their assignment: They must steal the Bombinating Beast from the Mallahans.

The Mallahans live in a lighthouse, which also used to be the home of the city's newspaper. Mr. Mallahan loafs about in his bathrobe while his daughter, Moxie Mallahan, continues to record the news of Stain'd-by-the-Sea, in hopes of eventually joining her mother, who works for a newspaper in the city. She shows Snicket the statue, which has been in the family for generations. Snicket is confused by this, as every piece of evidence says that the statue is already in the hands of its rightful owners; however, Markson intends to steal the statue anyway.

In town, Snicket discovers the library, run by the sub-librarian Dashiell Qwerty, a man who wears leather jackets and has an outrageous haircut. It is here that he meets Stew Mitchum, a slingshot-carrying sadistic young boy who mimics what Snicket says in a mocking voice. He is the son of the only two police officers in town. The Mitchums drive a modified station wagon with a red flashlight strapped to the top in place of a siren. It is at the library that Snicket learns of a way to communicate with his sister, Kit Snicket, back in the city by requesting books whose titles contain their intended messages.

At night, he and Markson sneak into the lighthouse to steal the statue. Since Moxie sees no importance in the statue, she assists Snicket, but hides from sight when Markson enters. Markson and Snicket escape from the lighthouse by climbing down a hawser that connects the lighthouse to the Sallis mansion. Snicket sees the light on the top of the Mitchums' station wagon waiting for them at the mansion, so he drops from the hawser and lands in a nearby tree.

It is in this tree that he meets Ellington Feint, who expresses an interest in acquiring the statue, as she believes that a mysterious figure named Hangfire has abducted her father, and only the statue will set him free. When the Mitchums arrive, Ellington hides the statue in a parcel so the police do not discover it in their unwarranted search of her makeshift home in an abandoned cottage. The Mitchums escort Snicket and Ellington to a mailbox where they mail some parcels, including the one containing the statue.

The next morning, Snicket discovers that Ellington swapped the statue for a bag of coffee, her preferred beverage. He takes a taxi driven by two young boys, Pip and Squeak Bellerophon, who have commandeered their father's taxi while he is ill, and work for tips. He has them take him to the Mallahan lighthouse, where he and Moxie decide to investigate the Sallis Mansion, after they collaborate and realize that the mansion has been abandoned for quite some time.

They discover Murphy Sallis tied to a chair in the flooding basement of the mansion. When they rescue her, they realize that she is not actually Mrs. Sallis, but is instead Sally Murphy, a notable theater legend in Stain'd-by-the-Sea. She and her accomplice had been living in the abandoned mansion, setting up a facade to convince Markson to steal the statue for them, or more specifically, him, the man pretending to be her butler, and, as Snicket soon realizes, Hangfire.

Snicket parts company with Moxie, and on his way back to the hotel at which he and Markson are staying, he finds the coffee shop that makes the bags of coffee of which Ellington is so fond. It is here he discovers a secret attic which contains the parcel that has the statue. This he brings to the library just before closing time, where he hides the statue behind what he expects is a very dull book, substituting a set of books into the parcel.

Delivering this parcel to the hotel concierge, Prosper Lost, Snicket receives a mysterious phone call from someone pretending to be Ellington. This person sends him on a wild goose chase, which he knowingly follows. While he is out, Hangfire asks for the parcel from Prosper, and upon discovering its contents, bursts into Markson's hotel room, where he ties her up before trashing the room in search of the statue.

Snicket meets up with Ellington at the coffee shop where the two eventually agree that the statue should go back to the Mallahans, but that Snicket would also help Ellington find her father. In the morning, they take the statue from the library and hide it in Ellington's bag. Markson and the Mitchums meet them, and the two are escorted back to the Mallahan lighthouse, where Snicket returns the statue to Moxie, only to discover that Ellington has actually swapped it for another bag of coffee. She escapes with the statue into the nearby forest.

In the final chapter, Snicket recaps the events to a twelve-year-old Hector, who is distraught at the lack of Mexican restaurants in the town. They share their individual expectations over the V.F.D. apprenticeship program before Hector leaves on a hot air balloon.

On the final page is an illustration of a young Kit Snicket investigating the Fountain of Victorious Finance before it has been installed in the financial district of the city.

== Characters ==
=== Main ===
- Lemony Snicket is the main protagonist of this novel. An apprentice who works for V.F.D
- S. Theodora Markson is Snicket's chaperone. She is the 52nd-ranked chaperone for V.F.D. on a list of 52.
- Ellington Feint is a girl with a penchant for coffee who is seeking out the statue in hopes of using it to rescue her father. She is a tall girl with green eyes, long black hair, long fingers with black nail varnish and curved eyebrows.
- Moxie Mallahan is an aspiring journalist who lives in a lighthouse with her father. She longs to move to the city to be with her mother, who works at the local newspaper.

=== Supporting ===
- Dashiell Qwerty is the sub-librarian of the Stain'd-by-the-Sea public library. He wears a leather coat and has a wild haircut that makes the Mitchums distrust him.
- Pecuchet (Pip) and Bouvard (Squeak) Bellerophon are two brothers who operate the Bellerophon Taxi while their father is ill. Pip steers while seated on a pile of books and Squeak uses the pedals and reads to his brother while they wait for the next fare. They work for tips, appreciating tips for good books to read over monetary tips.
- Stewart "Stew" Mitchum is a sadistic boy whose parents are the only two law enforcement personnel in town.
- Prosper Lost is the proprietor of the Lost Arms, the hotel at which Markson and Snicket reside during their stay in Stain'd-by-the-Sea.
- Officers Harvey and Mimi Mitchum are a married couple who act as the only two police officers in Stain'd-by-the-Sea. They believe their son, Stewart, to be incapable of any wrongdoing, and tend to circumvent the judicial process in the pursuit of justice. They also argue a lot.
- Murphy Sallis (Sally Murphy) commissions S. Theodora Markson to steal the statue of the Bombinating Beast and deliver it to its rightful owners. She is really an actress pretending to be Mrs. Sallis, the real Sallis family having moved out of the mansion long ago.

=== Guest ===
- Kit Snicket is never mentioned by name, but is Snicket's "trusted associate" with whom he misses an appointment near the beginning of the book to dig a tunnel to the museum using the hole meant to be filled by the Fountain of Victorious Finance. They communicate with each other by remotely requesting from the other's local library book titles that convey their messages to one another.
- Hangfire is an expert impersonator of voices. He wants the statue for unknown reasons.
- Hector appears briefly during the last chapter of the book. He and Snicket share their unmet expectations in the V.F.D. apprenticeship program.

== Literary references ==
The plot bears a strong resemblance to the 1930 novel The Maltese Falcon, by Dashiell Hammett. Numerous allusions are made to Duke Ellington; for instance, "Ellington Feint" bears his name, Snicket stays in the Far East Suite and comes across the library book "An Analysis of Black, Brown and Beige".

== Reception ==
Ryan Britt of TOR celebrated the novel as an example of "The Lemony Snicket voice ... which wraps absurd melancholy around this optimism." Claire Hayes of INIS Magazine stated "If ... you enjoy mysteries within mysteries, a good giggle and some old fashioned detective work, take a look inside the covers of this new Snicket offering." Josh Lacey of The Guardian stated the book is a "charming, clever and enormously enjoyable little mystery which asks all sorts of questions, but answers very few of them; I'm already impatient to read the rest of the series."

Noah Cruickshank writing for The A.V. Club wrote "It's heavy stuff, but told in a way that amps up the tension even more, making the wait for the next book all the more nerve-racking." Jenni Laidman of Chicago Tribune claimed the book "operates on three levels": the basic plot, humour and wit, and cultural references "that turn the book into a puzzle". Laidman also said that "[the plot] matters far less than the wordplay that gets us there" and that although "it's still a children's book", the book "proves fun for adults, too".
