= When Did You See Her Last? =

2013 book by Lemony Snicket

- Front cover of the first U.S. edition of the novel
- Author: Lemony Snicket (pen name of Daniel Handler)
- Illustrator: Seth
- Cover artist: Seth
- Language: English
- Series: All the Wrong Questions
- Genre: Mystery
- Publisher: Little, Brown and Company
- Publication date: October 15, 2013
- Publication place: United States
- Media type: Print (hardback)
- Pages: 288
- ISBN: 978-0-316-12305-1
- Dewey Decimal: Fic 21
- Preceded by: Who Could That Be at This Hour?
- Followed by: Shouldn't You Be In School?

When Did You See Her Last? is the second book in the All the Wrong Questions series by Lemony Snicket (also known as Daniel Handler), a series set before the events of A Series of Unfortunate Events. In this darkly humorous story, Snicket continues the tale of his time in Stain'd-by-the-Sea, accompanied by his chaperone, S. Theodora Markson.

== Plot ==
S. Theodora Markson and Lemony Snicket are called to the Knight household: housemaids Zada and Zora are worried about the disappearance of Cleo Knight. Cleo's parents are permanently dazed and confused, which Lemony realizes is because their doctor, Dr. Flammarion, is injecting them with laudanum. In Cleo's room, Lemony finds a failed attempt at making invisible ink.

On the journey back to the Lost Arms, Lemony orders Theodora to stop the car, spotting a Dilemma (the car Cleo Knight owned). It had a flat tire with a hypodermic needle stuck into it. Lemony begins to investigate witnesses. Polly Partial claims she saw Cleo yesterday, purchasing her favorite breakfast, and then leaving in the Bellerophon taxi to run away to join the circus. Jake Hix says that Cleo had visited Hungry's and left in her Dilemma at the same time. However, Lemony proves Partial's testimony is unreliable due to her bad eyesight.

Moxie and Lemony walk to the library to investigate the case; they research invisible ink and Colonel Colophon, a war hero of Stain'd by the Sea who had a clinic built for him in the town. Lemony has to abandon Moxie when he sees a woman returning library books that were in Hangfire's possession. Following the woman, he ends up finding Ellington Feint in an abandoned aquarium; she has been posing as Cleo Knight and pretending to work on invisible ink for Hangfire. Lemony causes a distraction and they both escape, although Ellington is arrested.

Lemony and his friends travel to Colophon Clinic. Lemony meets a man claiming to be Colonel Colophon; when Lemony realizes it is Hangfire, the man jumps out of the window and escapes. Lemony and Jake find Cleo Knight in a basement; Dr. Flammarion is arrested by the Mitchums, along with the woman who Lemony followed earlier. Lemony soon learns that Moxie had been stabbed with a knife by the woman, Cleo starts mixing medicine for her wound. Moxie eventually recovers.

In the epilogue, Lemony talks to a young Captain Widdershins and learns that Kit had been arrested.

== See also ==
- All the Wrong Questions
- Lemony Snicket
- V.F.D.
