= Palookaville (comics) =

Comic book by Gregory Gallant

Publication information
- Publisher: Drawn & Quarterly
- Schedule: irregular
- Format: Ongoing series
- Genre: Alternative comics
- Publication date: April 1991

Creative team
- Created by: Seth

Palookaville (also frequently appears as both Palooka-Ville and Palooka-ville) is a comic book written and drawn by cartoonist Gregory Gallant, better known as Seth, and published by Drawn & Quarterly. The first issue appeared in April 1991 and remains ongoing, with irregular publishing dates. The comics are generally portrayals filled with lost, lonely characters searching for meaning, often reaching back into the past.

The series and its creator have won multiple industry awards, including the 1997 Ignatz Award for Outstanding Artist and for Outstanding Graphic Novel or Collection (for the It's a Good Life If You Don't Weaken collection).

The first 19 issues were published in traditional comic book (pamphlet) format approximately annually (from 1991 to 2008), while the 20th issue (2010) was published as an expanded hardcover. Issues 21-24 have continued to be published in this format, owing to changes in the American comic book market, specifically the decline in sales of single-issue comic books during the decade 2000–2010.

== Publication history ==
Issues of Palookaville
#	Date	Major Story	Notes
1	April 1991		10th anniversary edition released in 2001 on smaller paper with silver cover
2	September 1991		
3	June 1993		
4	December 1993	It's a Good Life, If You Don't Weaken	
5	May 1994	It's a Good Life, If You Don't Weaken	
6	November 1994	It's a Good Life, If You Don't Weaken	
7	April 1995	It's a Good Life, If You Don't Weaken	
8	December 1995	It's a Good Life, If You Don't Weaken	
9	June 1996	It's a Good Life, If You Don't Weaken	
10	April 1997	Clyde Fans	
11	October 1997	Clyde Fans	
12	May 1998	Clyde Fans	
13	July 1999	Clyde Fans	
14	May 2000	Clyde Fans	
15	May 2001	Clyde Fans	
16	February 2003	Clyde Fans	
17	2004	Clyde Fans	
18	October 2005	Clyde Fans	
19	2008	Clyde Fans	
20	October 2010	Clyde Fans	First hardcover issue
21	October 2013	Clyde Fans	
22	April 2015	Clyde Fans	
23	July 2017	Clyde Fans	
24	July 2023		
25	April 2026		
