= Clyde Fans =

Graphic novel by Seth

- Cover to Clyde Fans: Book One (Drawn & Quarterly, 2004)
- Date: 1997–2004
- Series: Palookaville
- Page count: 156 pages
- Publisher: Drawn & Quarterly

Creative team
- Creator: Seth

Chronology
- Preceded by: George Sprott

Clyde Fans is a graphic novel (or "picture novel") by Canadian cartoonist Seth.

The story follows two brothers—one outgoing, the other painfully introverted—as they watch their electric fan business go under in the face of competition from the air conditioning industry.

Seth serialized Clyde Fans in issues #10–23 of his comic book Palookaville from 1998 to 2017. The collection Clyde Fans: Part One (collecting issues 10-12) appeared in 2000, but Part Two was never published. Part One and the contents from issues 13-15 were collected in 2004 as Clyde Fans: Book One. Finally, the entire work was published by Drawn & Quarterly on April 16, 2019.

It was longlisted for the Giller Prize in 2020, the first graphic novel to make a Giller nomination list.

== Overview ==
Clyde Fans is the story of two brothers and their failure to keep their family business afloat in the face of changing technology, as well as the two brothers' unsociability, which one brother is able to deal with on the surface, but the other is painfully unable to. The finished book encompasses five parts.

=== Synopsis ===
Part One of the story opens in 1997 with Abe Matchcard speaking to the reader while puttering around his home, the old Clyde Fans building in Toronto. He tells the story of how he and his brother, Simon, watched their family's electric fan company go out of business in the face of the emerging air conditioning industry, while relating stories of his sales technique and talking about his peculiar brother.

The story then, in Part Two, moves back in time to 1957, and focuses on Simon's attempt at a "real life", despite his "inability to cope" with his role as salesman, while his more outgoing, natural salesman brother dominates and belittles him. He sets out "on a humiliatingly unsuccessful attempt at opening new sales territory", but is turned down by potential client after potential client due to his introversion and insecure approach. He suffers something of a breakdown, and ends up sitting under a tree in a miniature golf course he had wandered through.

Part Three moves to 1966, with Simon's career as salesman over, and Abe struggling to keep the business afloat. Eventually, Abe and Simon struggle with having to put their mother in a nursing home. Simon muses at length on the passage of time.

Part Four opens in 1975. Abe has to make the difficult decision of having to sign papers to close the factory, a decision he blames on striking workers. Afterwards, he returns to the Clyde Fans building to tell Simon the news that their business is finished; Simon has become a recluse and the two brothers rarely speak. They have a tense conversation about their father, who deserted them and their business inexplicably years before. Afterwards, Abe contacts an old lover, Alice, with whom he has an awkward dinner conversation. Finally, Abe decides to return to the Clyde Fans building, to spend the rest of his life there, but his car breaks down at the side of the road.

Part Five returns to Simon sitting beneath the tree at the end of Part Two in 1957. In his reverie, Simon has visions of deserted, decaying Ontario buildings and landscapes, and concludes that he is meant to live the life of a recluse. He returns to the Clyde Fans building, determined to spend the rest of his days within its walls.

== Characters ==
Abraham (Abe) Matchcard
A retired fan salesman, who narrates much of the story. A "born salesman", who dominates and continually denigrates his shy, reserved brother Simon.
Simon Matchcard
Abe's shy, introverted brother, who narrates part five. He obsessively collects penny postcards. Seth himself is an obsessive collector of comics and pop culture artifacts, while admitting that he often finds such people "hateful", as they are often "greedy, secretive, rude, [and] socially awkward".

== Background ==
The idea for the Clyde Fans company came from an actual old storefront in Toronto called Clyde Fans. Seth related, "I used to look into window when I walked by because I'm very attracted to this sort of thing. In the dim light of the office you could see on the back wall two photographs of two men, which were probably the owners. I just assumed they were brothers. Over the next couple of years while working on projects I put together a story of what these guy's lives were about although it probably had nothing to do with the reality of their real lives."

== Style ==
The story is drawn in Seth's familiar wobbly, thick-stroked brush cartooning, "deceptively simple and expressive lines, unhurried, exact, and luxurious; shading rich with texture." As in It's a Good Life, If You Don't Weaken, the artwork was done using a two-colour process, with black and white "aerodynamic" linework accented with grey and blue shading on beige-coloured paper. The art is reminiscent of 1930s New Yorker cartoons, giving the work the look of melancholic nostalgia.

Seth attempted to move away from traditional comic book storytelling techniques by slowing down the narrative and making use of silent panels, "giving a story as much length and breathing space as it needs to be told". He said, "panels that aren't necessary to move the story along but are necessary just to create the right mood for what you're doing."

== Awards ==
- (2005) Doug Wright Award for Best Book
- (2024?) Canada Post stamp

== See also ==
- Jimmy Corrigan, the Smartest Kid on Earth
