= Why Is This Night Different From All Other Nights? =

2015 book by Lemony Snicket

- Front cover of the U.S. edition of the novel.
- Author: Lemony Snicket (pen name of Daniel Handler)
- Illustrator: Seth
- Cover artist: Seth
- Language: English
- Series: All the Wrong Questions
- Genre: Mystery
- Publisher: Little, Brown and Company
- Publication date: September 29, 2015
- Publication place: United States
- Media type: Print, ebook, audiobook
- Pages: 305 (first edition)
- ISBN: 978-0-316-12304-4 (Hardcover)
- Dewey Decimal: Fic 21
- Preceded by: Shouldn't You Be in School?

Why Is This Night Different From All Other Nights? is the fourth and final book in Lemony Snicket's children's series All the Wrong Questions. The series features young apprentice Snicket, who is attempting to uncover the mystery behind a villain named Hangfire in Stain'd-by-the-Sea. The book was published on September 29, 2015 by Little, Brown and Company and features illustrations by Seth.

== Plot ==
S. Theodora Markson sneaks away from the Lost Arms at night, but Lemony Snicket decides to follow her. She goes to Dicey's Department Store and steals a costume, and then travels to Stain'd Station. When Snicket tries to get on the train leaving with prisoners Dashiell Qwerty and Ellington Feint, he is told he needs a ticket, but without any money he cannot find a way to get on the train. He also meets Polly Partial and Dame Sally Murphy at the station, the latter of which helps a strange looking passenger get on board with her. He gets a lift from Pip and Squeak to a place along the railway line where he can jump aboard, and Moxie Mallahan who is also on board opens the window to let him in. She shows him a fake Bombinating Beast made out of cardboard, made by Ornette Lost to trick Hangfire.

Dashiell Qwerty is found dead inside his jail cell, and Theodora is assumed to be the murderer by the Officers Mitchum. However, Lemony doesn't believe she did it, so he goes about the train looking for witnesses. He finds three suspicious librarians named Pocket, Walleye and Eratosthenes, along with several of his associates (Moxie Mallahan, Kellar Haines, Cleo Knight, Jake Hix and Ornette Lost) who were also on board. He then finds Ellington Feint; shortly into their conversation, Hangfire arrives and shoots a dart at Ellington, apparently killing her as she falls to the floor. Snicket covers her with her jacket without anyone else noticing she is dead and makes a deal with Hangfire to give him the statue (the fake one) on a condition. After Hangfire leaves, Snicket helps Ellington up and reveals to her that he knew she was alive. Ellington reveals that the dart missed her by an inch, but she pretended she is dead in an attempt to trick Hangfire. Snicket hides Ellington by tying her with a rope on the train railing outside the window of the prisoners compartment to hide her from Hangfire. Snicket later realizes that Moxie and Kellar both tried to trick Hangfire with a fake statue, revealing that Ornette made two statues for Moxie and Kellar each and Hangfire knew they were lying about giving him the statue.

After negotiation with Hangfire and with the Mitchums, and a chain of events Snicket is able to gather everybody aboard the train (Moxie, Kellar, Cleo and Jake, Stew Mitchum Sally Murphy, Sharon Haines, the three librarians and Hangfire) together in the jail cell where Qwerty was killed. It is also revealed that Lizzy Haines, Kellar’s sister who was held hostage, actually escaped from Hangfire with Sally Murphy’s help. She was the strange looking passenger Snicket had seen on the station previously. The Haines family is reunited. Snicket now reveals that it was actually Stew Mitchum who killed Qwerty in the prison cell and the Officers Mitchum accused Theodora to save their son Stew, who was working for Hangfire all along. He then uses the statue of the Bombinating Beast to summon the real creature and when it arrives, Hangfire’s mask falls off, revealing himself to be Armstrong Feint, Ellington’s father. Snicket pushes Hangfire/Armstrong Feint towards the monster to his death as the monster eats him. The passengers on board are shocked and refuse to make eye contact with Snicket, including his friends and Ellington Feint who is furious because he killed her father. Ellington Feint is arrested for her previous crimes and is put in the cell with Kit Snicket, Lemony's sister, who was aboard the train the whole time. A member of V.F.D. talks to Snicket privately and chastises him for ruining their plan of capturing Hangfire alive. The series ends with Lemony walking away, alone, into the Clusterous Forest, uncertain of his fate.

== Title allegory ==
This book continues with the recurring Jewish themes throughout Snicket's work. Why Is This Night Different From All Other Nights? is an allusion to the Jewish Passover Seder, in which a guest at the Seder, most normally the youngest, will ask the Ma Nishtana (also known as the Four Questions, which Snicket mirrors through the series' format, a collection of four different books each titled with a question), introduced by the question (not counted among the four) "Why is this night different from all other nights?".
