= Norman Levine =

Canadian writer and poet

- Born: October 22, 1923
- Died: June 14, 2005 (aged 81)
- Education: McGill University; King's College, London
- Writing career
- Notable awards: Matt Cohen Prize

Albert Norman Levine (October 22, 1923 – June 14, 2005) was a Canadian short story writer, novelist and poet who spent most of his adult life in England. He is perhaps best remembered for his terse prose. Though he was part of the St. Ives artistic community in Cornwall, and friends with painters Patrick Heron and Francis Bacon, his written expression was not abstract, but concrete. "The leaner the language the more suggestive," he wrote in his 1993 essay, Sometimes It Works.

Levine's reputation stood high in the United Kingdom and in Europe, although his reputation has been overshadowed in Canada because of his unflattering portrayals of the underside of Canadian life. Heinrich Böll was a champion of Levine's work.

== Life and career ==
Norman Levine was born on October 22, 1923. His birthplace is alternatively described as Ottawa, Canada or Poland. His Jewish family had fled from Poland to Canada with the advent of anti-Semitism in the years prior to World War II. His adolescence was spent on the streets of Ottawa, but his coming of age was his time as a Lancaster bomber as bomb aimer and second pilot for the Royal Canadian Air Force in 429 (Bomber) Squadron RCAF. He was based at Leeming.

After the war, he enrolled at McGill University, graduating with a BA and a MA. He then moved to England, ostensibly to pursue a PhD at King's College, London, which was never completed.

In England, he met an Englishwoman, Margaret, settled down and had three children. His writing, a reflection of his life, was also a direct influence on that life, as he had little money to keep up rent payments; as a result his family often moved.

In 1958, he published Canada Made Me, a travelogue across Canada. The book negative portrayal of Canada provoked controversy there, and McClelland & Stewart refused to publish a Canadian edition, as had been originally planned. A Canadian edition did not appear until 1979.

After England he lived, for a time, in Canada, with his second wife. He also lived in France before finally returning to England, where he died ten years later.

Later in life, there was a thaw in Levine's relations with the Canadian literature establishment. In 2002 he was presented with the Matt Cohen Prize, established in 2001 by the Writers' Trust of Canada to recognize a lifetime of work by a Canadian writer.

== Bibliography ==
=== Short stories ===
- One Way Ticket (1961)
- I Don’t Want to Know Anyone Too Well (1971) (translated into German by Annemarie Böll as"Ein kleines Stückchen Blau")
- Thin Ice (1979)
- Why Do You Live So Far Away? (1984) (translated into German by Annemarie Böll as "Der Spielplatz")
- Champagne Barn (1984)
- The Beat and the Still (1990)
- Something Happened Here (1991)
- The Ability to Forget (2003)

=== Novels ===
- The Angled Road (1952)
- From a Seaside Town (1970)

=== Poetry ===
- Myssium (1948)
- The Tight-rope Walker (1950)
- I Walk by the Harbour (1976)

=== Non-fiction ===
- Canada Made Me (1958)
- "Sometimes It Works" (in How Stories Mean, edited by John Metcalf and J.R. Struthers) (1993)

=== Editor ===
- Canadian Winter's Tales (1968)
