= All the Wrong Questions =

Children's book series by Lemony Snicket

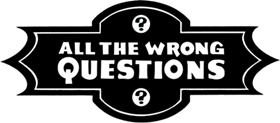
- Who Could That Be at This Hour? (2012); When Did You See Her Last? (2013); Shouldn't You Be in School? (2014); Why Is This Night Different From All Other Nights? (2015)
- Author: Lemony Snicket (pen name of Daniel Handler)
- Illustrator: Seth
- Country: United States
- Language: English
- Genre: Children's fiction, Humor, Mystery, Noir
- Publisher: Little, Brown and Company (US); Egmont Publishing (UK)
- Published: October 23, 2012 – September 29, 2015
- Media type: Print, e-book, audiobook
- No. of books: Four
- Preceded by: A Series of Unfortunate Events

All the Wrong Questions is a four-part children's book series and prequel to A Series of Unfortunate Events by Lemony Snicket (the pen name of American author Daniel Handler). The series explores Snicket's childhood apprenticeship to the secret society V.F.D. and expands the fictional universe introduced in the novel The Bad Beginning, the first of thirteen installments in the A Series of Unfortunate Events books.

Handler signed with Egmont Publishing (UK) in August 2009 and Little, Brown and Company (U.S.) in November 2009 to begin working on the series. Although the author switched from his former publisher, HarperCollins, to Little, Brown and Company, he continued to work with his longtime editor Susan Rich.

The first book, Who Could That Be at This Hour?, was released on October 23, 2012. The second book, When Did You See Her Last?, was released on October 15, 2013. The third book, Shouldn't You Be in School?, was released on September 30, 2014. The fourth and final book, Why Is This Night Different From All Other Nights?, was released on September 29, 2015. A companion novel, File Under: 13 Suspicious Incidents, was released on April 1, 2014.

== Premise ==
The four-book series revolves around a thirteen-year-old Lemony Snicket who has moved to Stain'd-by-the-Sea. The town of Stain'd-by-the-Sea was abandoned following the closure of Ink Inc. (a large ink factory) and the town's sea being drained. Snicket recalls four adventures he had in Stain'd-by-the-Sea, with each revolving around a question he incorrectly asked. As Lemony and his chaperone, S. Theodora Markson, investigate crimes, Snicket makes both friends and enemies, including Hangfire.

The series runs alongside the story of Lemony's sister Kit as she completes a similar mission for V.F.D. Lemony's main mission is to protect a statue called the Bombinating Beast from various people who desire it, including Hangfire.

== Characters ==
- Lemony Snicket: the narrator and protagonist; a thirteen-year-old apprentice of V.F.D. staying in Stain'd-by-the-Sea.
- S. Theodora Markson: Snicket's chaperone in the town; an incompetent member of V.F.D. She was ranked as the worst of all the chaperones. Known for her unruly hair.
- Moxie Mallahan: a child and aspiring journalist living in Stain'd-by-the-Sea after her mother abandoned her.
- Ellington Feint: a mysterious girl with green eyes and a love of coffee. She wants the Bombinating Beast so that she can trade it with Hangfire in return for her father, Armstrong.
- Dashiell Qwerty: a "sub-librarian" in Stain'd-by-the-Sea. He is known for his wild hair and leather jacket.
- Pip and Squeak Bellerophon: two children who are temporarily driving a taxi while their father is ill.
- Jake Hix: a chef at Hungry's, working for his aunt, and the boyfriend of Cleo Knight.
- Cleo Knight: a chemist working on creating invisible ink, and the girlfriend of Jake Hix.
- Hangfire: the main antagonist; a mysterious villain in Stain'd-by-the-Sea, who is committing various crimes to try and obtain the Bombinating Beast. His plans involve kidnapping children and small aquatic animals. He started a group called the Inhumane Society and he has the ability to mimic voices.
- Stew Mitchum: the son of Harvey and Mimi, Stew is cruel towards Snicket although he always manages to hide this fact from his parents. He also idolizes Hangfire and the Inhumane Society.
- Harvey and Mimi Mitchum: the town's police officers, notorious for constantly arguing. They are the attentive parents of Stew.
- Prosper Lost: owner of the Lost Arms hotel in Stain'd-by-the-Sea, where Snicket and Theodora stay. Prosper is described as nosey.
- Kellar Haines: the son of Sharon and friend of Lemony, and a very fast typist. His goal is to rescue his sister, Lizzie, from Hangfire.
- Sharon Haines: the mother of Kellar and Lizzie and associate of Hangfire. She impersonates a Department of Education official to save her daughter Lizzie from Hangfire.
- Dame Sally Murphy: an associate of Hangfire and a theatrical legend in Stain'd-by-the-Sea.
- Ornette Lost: the young daughter of Prosper who has exceptional origami and fire fighting skills.
- Doctor Flammarion and Nurse Dander: associates of Hangfire, employees at the Colophon Clinic and apothecaries to the Knight family.
- Kit Snicket: the sister of Lemony who is also a dedicated member of V.F.D. Her mission is to break into a museum. She is arrested alongside Ellington for her crimes.
- Lizzie Haines: the daughter of Sharon, sister of Kellar.
- Gifford: A member of V.F.D
- Ghede: A member of V.F.D
- Walleye, Pocket, and Eratosthenes: Librarians Lemony met on the train.
- Polly Partial: A grocery store owner in Stain'd-by-the-Sea.
- Zada and Zora: Twin maids working for the Knight family.

== Background ==
In August 2009, it was announced that Egmont Publishing had purchased the rights to a new series by Snicket. By November 2009, Little, Brown and Company had purchased the North American rights to the series. The series will have some overlap with his previous series, A Series of Unfortunate Events, but will not involve some of its protagonists, the Baudelaire orphans. Daniel Handler, the author behind the Snicket pen name, clarified that the series "is mostly an entirely new story. But if you are a close reader of the series you will see some overlap. There will be something for people who are hungry for that sort of thing." He reiterated: "It does have some overlap with the series, but it's not a continuation."

Asked about his progress with the series in January 2010, Handler stated that he was "at the point that it's a twinkle in someone else's eye". He told The Scotsman that the series was "still kind of fetal", and that he would be writing it in 2010. The Times reported he is playing with a plot and title. The only hint to the story's plot provided by Handler was that the series will "approach that question mark from a different angle". In October 2010, Snicket elaborated: "I'm doing research for a new series for older children that is about more experiences from my own life; it takes place at a time before the Baudelaire children were born."

== Promotion ==
On February 8, 2012, the name of the series was revealed, All the Wrong Questions, along with the first book's title, Who Could That Be at This Hour?. The series is to follow Lemony Snicket's childhood in "an organization nobody knows about". The first book has been given a first printing of one million copies and was released on October 23, 2012. The title of the first book had earlier been hinted at in a message to fansite 667 Dark Avenue, where it was apparently designated as "The First Question". The second book is titled "When Did You See Her Last?"

Chapter One of Who Could That Be at This Hour? was published on Entertainment Weekly's website on June 1, and, three days later, on The Guardian, including the first chapter illustration. Subsequently, further chapter illustrations and the second chapter were made available to the 667 Dark Avenue fansite as thanks for a birthday gift to Daniel Handler. The first two chapters were also made available in promotional attache cases distributed at BookExpo America. The two chapters were also later made available on the series's official website, lemonysnicketlibrary. Chapters three and four were later released with the first two as an E-book via Amazon.com and Google Play.

== See also ==
- Lemony Snicket bibliography
