= Helen Humphreys =

Canadian poet and novelist (born 1961)

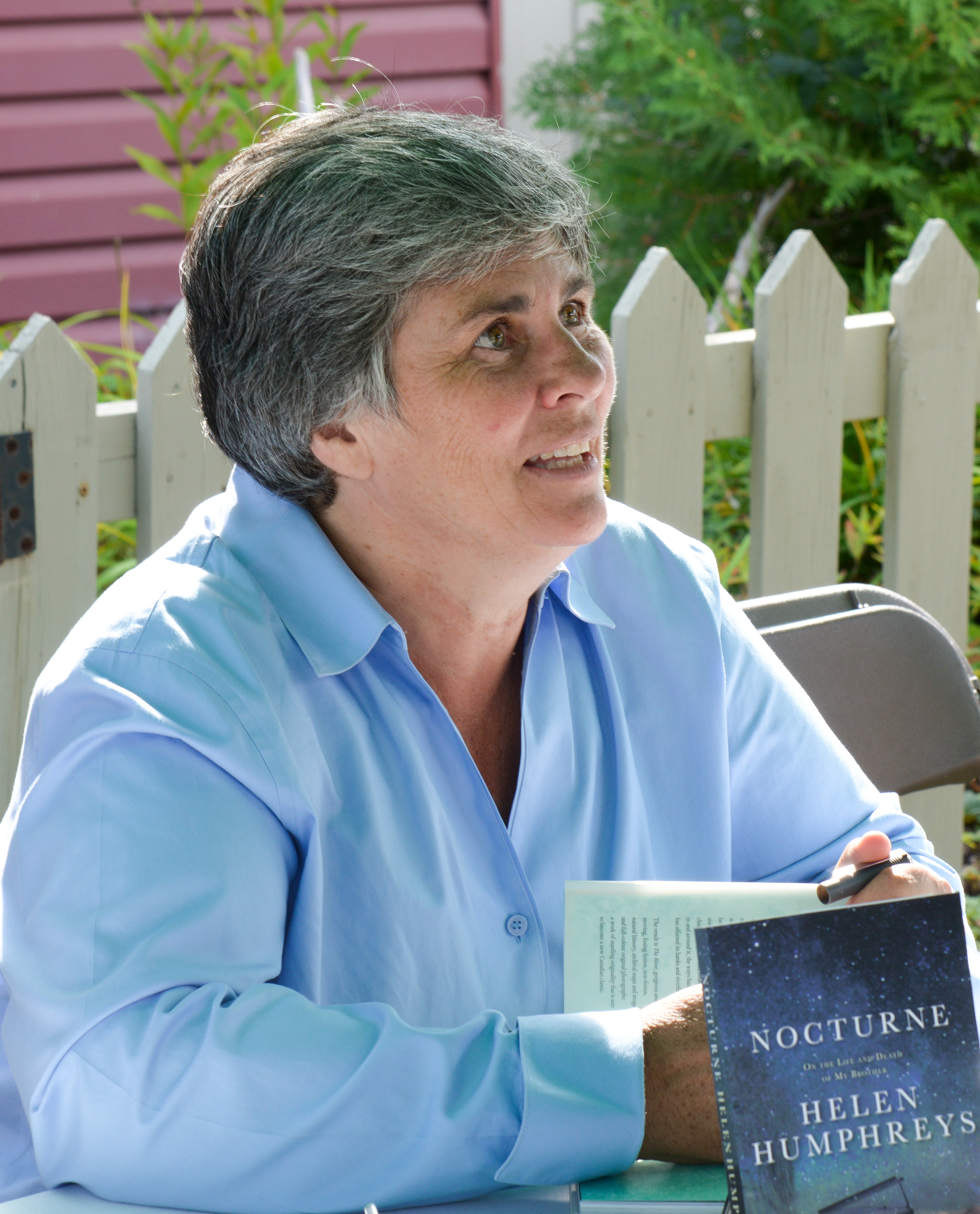
- Humphreys at the Eden Mills Writers' Festival in 2016
- Born: March 29, 1961 (age 65); Kingston-on-Thames, England
- Occupations: Poet and novelist
- Known for: Poet laureate of Kingston, Ontario, 2015–2019
- Writing career
- Notable works: Leaving Earth (1998); Anthem (1999); Afterimage (2000); Wild Dogs (2004); The Reinvention of Love (2011); The Evening Chorus (2015)
- Notable awards: Matt Cohen Award (2023)

Helen Humphreys (born March 29, 1961) is a Canadian poet and novelist.

== Personal life ==
Humphreys was born in Kingston-on-Thames, England. Her brother Martin and sister Cathy were born after the family moved to Canada. She now lives in Kingston, Ontario, with her dog, Fig. When she was younger, Humphreys was expelled from high school and had to attend an alternative school to finish her education.

== Writing career ==
Humphreys's first novel, Leaving Earth, was a New York Times Notable Book in 1998, and a winner of the City of Toronto Book Award.

In describing how she became a writer, Humphreys said: "I started writing when I was young and I just kept going. I read voraciously. I sent my poems (for I was writing exclusively poems then) out to magazines, and eventually I began to get them published. My first book of poetry came out when I was 25."

In a very favourable review of The Reinvention of Love in The Globe and Mail, Donna Bailey Nurse wrote: "The story is set amid the political turbulence and artistic fervour of 19th-century Paris. Charles Sainte-Beuve, an influential critic, earns the friendship of Victor Hugo after writing a review celebrating the writer's poems. He joins Hugo's literary circle, the Cenacle, which includes painter Delacroix, poet Lamartine and the boastful, profligate Alexandre Dumas. Charles becomes a fixture in the bustling Hugo household on Notre-Dame-des-Champs."

The Globe and Mail wrote about Humphreys's 2015 novel: "The Evening Chorus, when all is said and done, is a formally conventional but for the most part satisfying yarn; a quiet novel about a calamitous event whose most trenchant passages show the cast of Humphreys's poet's eye."

Quill & Quire says of The River (2017): "Comparing The River to Helen Humphreys's critically acclaimed bestseller The Frozen Thames, her 2007 collection of vignettes about the eponymous river, it's obvious that the author is not content to repeat past successes. The new book, a wide-ranging exploration of the Napanee River in Ontario, along which she owns a small property, clearly shows that Humphreys possesses extraordinary tools and wields them with daring and precision."

In 2023, she was the recipient of the Writers' Trust of Canada's Matt Cohen Award for her career in writing.

== Works ==
=== Poetry ===
- Gods and Other Mortals (1986)
- Nuns Looking Anxious (1990)
- Listening to Radios (1990)
- The Perils of Geography (1995)
- Anthem (1999)

=== Novels ===
- Ethel on Fire (1991)
- Leaving Earth (1998) – winner of the City of Toronto Book Award
- Afterimage (2000) – winner of the Rogers Writers' Trust Fiction Prize
- The Lost Garden (2002)
- Wild Dogs (2004) – adapted for the stage by Anne Hardcastle in 2008
- The Frozen Thames (2007)
- Coventry (2008)
- The Reinvention of Love (2011)
- The Evening Chorus (2015)
- Machine Without Horses (2018)
- Rabbit Foot Bill (2020)
- Followed by the Lark (2024)

=== Nonfiction ===
- Nocturne: On the Life and Death of My Brother (2013)
- The River (2015), ISBN 1770412557
- The Ghost Orchard: The Hidden History of the Apple in North America (2017), ISBN 1443451517
- Field Study: Meditations on a Year at the Herbarium (2021), ISBN 1770415343
- And a Dog Called Fig: Solitude, Connection, the Writing Life (2022), ISBN 037460388X
- Summerland: Family, Loss, and the Inheritance of Dreams: A Memoir (2026)

== Awards and recognition ==
- Canadian Authors Association Award for Poetry for Anthem (1990)
- New York Times Notable Book (1998) for Leaving Earth
- City of Toronto Book Award for Leaving Earth
- Rogers Writers' Trust Fiction Prize (2000) for Afterimage
- Harbourfront Festival Prize (2009)
- The Reinvention of Love (2011) was longlisted for the IMPAC Dublin Literary Award and shortlisted for the Canadian Authors Association for Fiction
- Appointed to a four-year term as poet laureate of Kingston, Ontario, March 2015
- The Evening Chorus was longlisted for the 2017 International Dublin Literary Award.
- Matt Cohen Award, 2023
