= Matt Cohen Award =

The Matt Cohen Award is an award given annually by the Writers' Trust of Canada to a Canadian writer, in honour of a distinguished lifetime contribution to Canadian literature. First presented in 2000, it was established in memory of Matt Cohen, a Canadian writer who died in 1999.

== Winners ==
- 2000 - Mavis Gallant
- 2001 - Norman Levine
- 2002 - Fred Bodsworth
- 2003 - Audrey Thomas
- 2004 - Howard Engel
- 2005 - Janet Lunn
- 2006 - Marie-Claire Blais
- 2007 - David Helwig
- 2008 - Sylvia Fraser
- 2009 - Paul Quarrington
- 2010 - Myrna Kostash
- 2011 - David Adams Richards
- 2012 - Jean Little
- 2013 - Andrew Nikiforuk
- 2014 - Susan Musgrave
- 2015 - Richard Wagamese
- 2016 - Brian Brett
- 2017 - Diane Schoemperlen
- 2018 - David Bergen
- 2019 - Olive Senior
- 2020 - Dennis Lee
- 2021 - Frances Itani
- 2022 - Candace Savage
- 2023 - Helen Humphreys
- 2024 - Marie Clements
- 2025 - Sheree Fitch
- 2026 - Maria Campbell
