= George Sprott =

Graphic novel by the cartoonist Seth

- Creator: Seth
- Date: 2009
- Page count: 96 pages
- Publisher: Drawn & Quarterly

Original publication
- Published in: The New York Times Magazine
- Date of publication: 2006

George Sprott: (1894–1975) is a graphic novel by Canadian cartoonist Seth, published in 2009.

The story tells of George Sprott, a vain and selfish 81-year-old retired television personality who reflects on his life, and whose life is recalled by those around him after his death. The comics are sprinkled with photos of models Seth made of buildings in the fictional Southern Ontario town of Dominion.

The story first ran as a serial in The New York Times Magazine in one-page episodes in 2006. A collection in large dimensions appeared in 2009 from Drawn & Quarterly. The book won a Doug Wright Award in 2010.

In 2017, Vancouver-based composer Mark Haney premiered his Omnis Temporalis based on the story with an immersive cartoon space of the television station, CKCK, designed by Seth himself. A recording of the performance was released as a vinyl record with packaging designed by Seth in 2022.
