= Seth (cartoonist) =

Canadian cartoonist (born 1962)

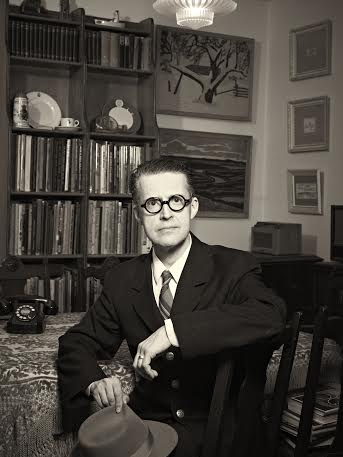
- Seth, c. 2014
- Born: Gregory Gallant; September 16, 1962 (age 64) Clinton, Ontario, Canada
- Areas: Cartoonist, writer, artist
- Pseudonym: Seth
- Notable works: It's a Good Life, If You Don't Weaken; Palookaville
- Awards: Ignatz Award, 1997; Eisner Award, 2005; Harvey Award, 2005

Gregory Gallant (born September 16, 1962), better known by his pen name Seth, is a Canadian cartoonist. He is best known for his series Palookaville and his mock-autobiographical graphic novel It's a Good Life, If You Don't Weaken (1996).

Seth draws in a style influenced by the classic cartoonists of The New Yorker. His work is nostalgic, especially for the early-to-mid-20th century period, and of Southern Ontario. His work also shows a depth and breadth of knowledge of the history of comics and cartooning.

== Early life and education ==
Seth was born Gregory Gallant on September 16, 1962, in Clinton, Ontario, Canada. His parents were John Henry Gallant and the English-born Violet Daisy Gallant (née Wilkinson); he was the youngest of their five children. His family moved frequently but he considers Strathroy, Ontario, his home town. He was inward, unathletic, and had few friends, and took to comic books and drawing at a young age.

Seth attended the Ontario College of Art in Toronto from 1980 to 1983. He became involved with the punk subculture and began wearing outlandish clothing, bleaching his hair, wearing makeup, and frequenting nightclubs. He took on the pen name Seth in 1982.

== Career ==
Seth, then living in Toronto, first drew attention to his work in 1985 when he took over art duties from the Hernandez brothers for Dean Motter's Mister X from Toronto publisher Vortex Comics. His run covered issues #6–13 (1985–88), after which he did commercial artwork for publications including Saturday Night and Fashion. In 1986 he met fellow Toronto-based Vortex artist Chester Brown, and in 1991 Toronto-based American cartoonist Joe Matt. The three became noted for doing confessional autobio comics in the early 1990s, and for depicting each other in their works.

In April 1991 he launched his own comic book, Palookaville, with Montreal publisher Drawn & Quarterly. By this time, Seth's artwork had evolved to a style inspired by The New Yorker cartoons of the 1930s and 1940s.

He is also a magazine illustrator and book designer, perhaps best known for his work designing the complete collection of Charles M. Schulz's classic comic strip Peanuts. The books, released by Fantagraphics Books in 26 volumes, combine Seth's signature aesthetic with Schulz's minimalistic comic creation. Similarly, he designed the Collected Doug Wright and the John Stanley Library.

Seth's illustration work includes the cover artwork for Aimee Mann's album Lost in Space (2001) and the jacket and French flaps for the Penguin Classics Portable Dorothy Parker (2006).

Clyde Fans, the story of two brothers whose trade in electric fans suffers and eventually goes out of business from the failure to adapt to the rise of air conditioning, was serialized in Palookaville. Seth's short graphic novel Wimbledon Green, about an eccentric comic-book collector, was published in November 2005.

== Graphic Novels ==
From September 2006 to March 25, 2007, Seth serialized a graphic novel titled George Sprott (1894–1975), for the Funny Pages section of The New York Times Magazine. Selections from George Sprott were featured in Best American Comics 2009. In the liner notes of that publication, Seth announced he was expanding Sprott into a book, filling in gaps that were cut to meet the restraints given by NYTM. The book was published by Drawn & Quarterly in May 2009.

Seth's affection for early- and mid-20th century popular culture and his relative disdain for pop culture since then is a recurrent theme in his work, both in terms of the characters (who are often nostalgic for the period) and his artistic style.

== Graphic Design Work ==
Seth's artwork has landed on the cover of The New Yorker three times, which he said was a professional milestone he was happy to achieve.

Seth collaborated with children's novelist Lemony Snicket on his four-part series All the Wrong Questions, starting with Who Could That Be at This Hour? released on October 23, 2012, and ending with Why Is This Night Different From All Other Nights? released on September 29, 2015. He also designed a series of book covers for the MIT Press's early 20th century science-fiction series Radium Age.

== Model buildings ==
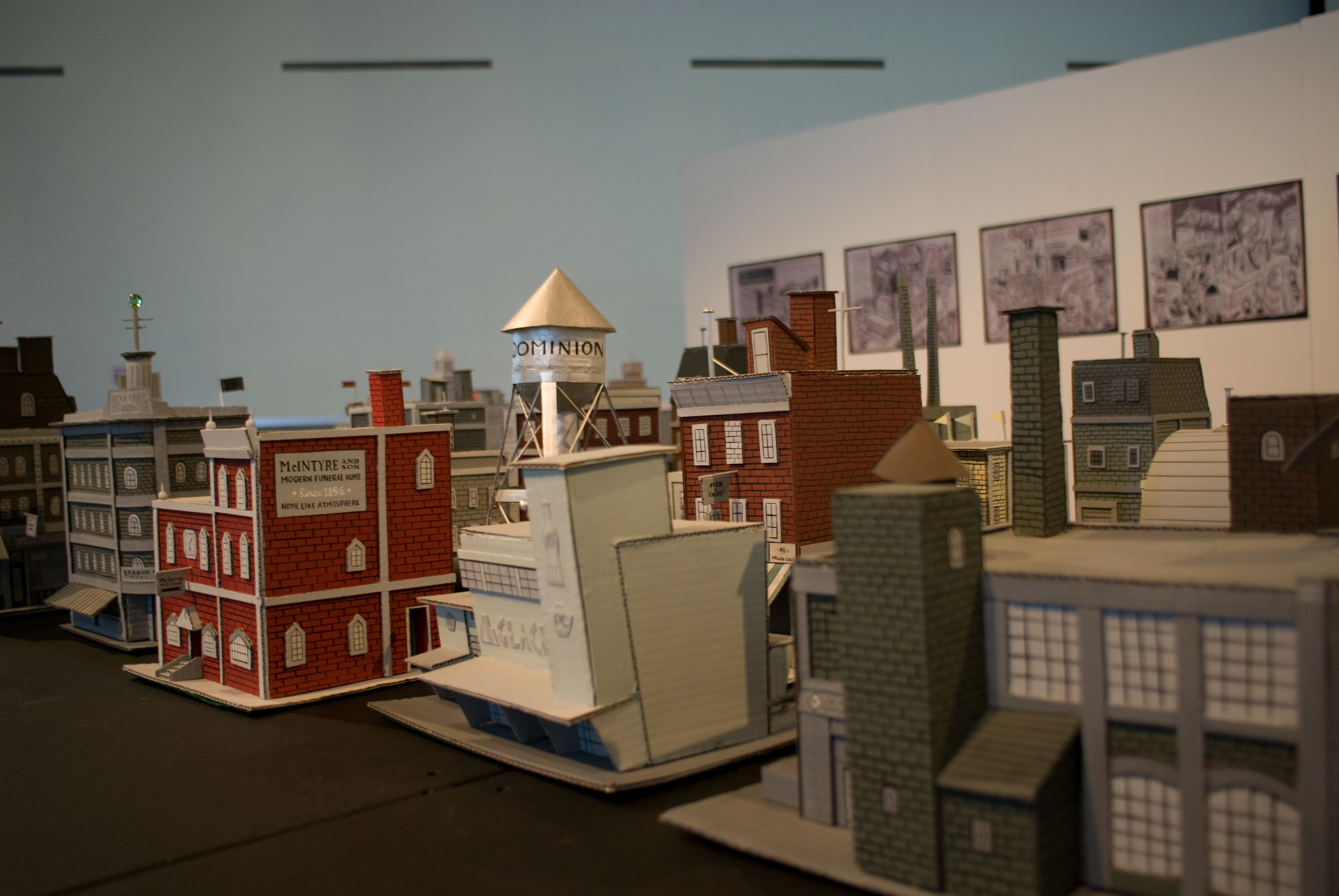
Seth's Dominion models on display at the Confederation Centre Art Gallery in Charlottetown, Prince Edward Island

A selection of Seth's original models (studies for his fictional city, Dominion) has been exhibited extensively, most notably at the Phoenix Art Museum in 2007 and the Art Gallery of Ontario in 2005 and 2017.

In 2008, Seth collaborated with the Kitchener-Waterloo Art Gallery and RENDER (now the University of Waterloo Art Gallery), on an exhibition titled "The North Star Talking Picture House". For this exhibition one of the buildings from Seth's Dominion City project was re-built at the Kitchener-Waterloo Art Gallery as a walk-in theatre wherein visitors could sit and watch a program of black and white documentary shorts that had been produced by the National Film Board of Canada.

Seth is the subject of the 2014 documentary film Seth's Dominion, which received the grand prize for best animated feature at the Ottawa International Animation Film Festival.

== Personal life ==
As of 2004, Seth lived in Guelph, Ontario, with his wife Tania Van Spyk, whom he married in 2002.

== Awards ==
Seth has won a number of industry awards throughout his career, including being elected to the Canadian Comic Book Creator Hall of Fame, and in 2011 was honoured by being the first cartoonist to win the literary Harbourfront Festival Prize. In 2020, Clyde Fans became the first graphic novel ever to receive a Giller Prize nomination. On June 17, 2022 Seth was awarded the Ordre des Arts et des Lettres by the French government.

In 2024, Seth (and Clyde Fans) appeared in a stamp series honouring Canadian graphic novelists. He was joined there by Chester Brown (Louis Riel) and Michel Rabagliati (Paul à Québec).

| Year | Organization | Award for | Award |
|---|---|---|---|
| 1997 | Ignatz Awards | Seth | Outstanding Artist |
| 1997 | Ignatz Awards | It's a Good Life, If You Don't Weaken | Outstanding Graphic Novel or Collection |
| 2005 | Eisner Awards | The Complete Peanuts | Best Publication Design |
| 2005 | Harvey Awards | The Complete Peanuts | Special Award for Excellence in Presentation |
| 2011 | Authors at Harbourfront Centre | Seth | Harbourfront Festival Prize |
| 2020 | Canadian Comic Book Creator Awards Association | Lifetime achievement award | Canadian Comic Book Creator Hall of Fame |
| 2022 | French Government | Recognition of significant contributions to the arts, literature, or the propagation of these fields | Ordre des Arts et des Lettres |

== Bibliography ==
=== Books and collections ===
| Year | Title | Publisher | ISBN | Notes |
|---|---|---|---|---|
| 1996 | It's a Good Life, If You Don't Weaken | Drawn & Quarterly | 1-896597-70-X | originally serialized in Palookaville #4–9 (1993–1996) |
| 2000 | Clyde Fans: Part One | Drawn & Quarterly | 978-1-894937-09-2 | originally serialized in Palookaville #10–12 (1997–1998) |
| 2001 | Vernacular Drawings | Drawn & Quarterly | 1-896597-41-6 | Sketchbook |
| 2003 | Clyde Fans: Part Two | Drawn & Quarterly | 978-1894937603 | originally serialized in Palookaville #13–15 (1999–2001) |
| 2004 | Clyde Fans: Book One | Drawn & Quarterly | 1-896597-84-X | Collects the same contents as Clyde Fans parts one and two, originally serialized in Palookaville #10–15 |
| 2005 | Wimbledon Green | Drawn & Quarterly | 1-896597-93-9 | |
| 2009 | George Sprott | Drawn & Quarterly | 978-1-897299-51-7 | originally serialized in The New York Times Magazine in 2006 |
| 2011 | The Great Northern Brotherhood of Canadian Cartoonists | Drawn & Quarterly | 978-1770460539 | |
| 2019 | Clyde Fans | Drawn & Quarterly | 978-1770463578 | originally serialized in Palookaville #10–23 (1997–2017) |

=== Other ===
- (2002) Inner Drawings and Cover Art for the Record Lost In Space by Aimee Mann, Super Ego Records.
- (2002) Cover art and design for the CD Vinyl Cafe Inc. Coast to Coast Story Service by Stuart McLean, Vinyl Cafe Productions, ISBN 9780968303184.
- (2003) Cover art and illustrations for the book Vinyl Cafe Diaries by Stuart McLean, Viking/Penguin Books Canada, ISBN 9780143169727.
- (2004) Editing, Illustrations and cover art for "Bannock, Beans & Black Tea" by J. H. Gallant – Montreal: Drawn & Quarterly, ISBN 1-896597-78-5
- (2004) Cover art and design for the CD A Story-Gram from Vinyl Cafe Inc. by Stuart McLean, Vinyl Cafe Productions, ISBN 9780968303191.
- (2005) Cover art and illustrations for the book Stories from the Vinyl Cafe (10th anniversary edition) by Stuart McLean, Penguin Canada, ISBN 9780670864768.
- (2005) Design and Inner drawings for "Christmas Days", by Derek McCormack, Anansi, ISBN 978-0-88784-193-4.
- (2006) Cover art and design for the book The Portable Dorothy Parker by Dorothy Parker, Penguin.
- (2006) Cover art and illustrations for the book Secrets from the Vinyl Cafe by Stuart McLean, Viking Canada, ISBN 9780670064465.
- (2006) Cover art and illustrations for the book Home from the Vinyl Cafe by Stuart McLean, Penguin Canada, ISBN 9780143056034.
- (2006) Forty Cartoon Books of Interest: A Supplement to Comic Art No. 8
- (2007) Design and Inner drawings for "Cocktail Culture", by Mark Kingwell, ISBN 978-1-84627-114-4.
- (2007) Cover art and design for the CD An Important Message from the Vinyl Cafe by Stuart McLean, Vinyl Cafe Productions, ISBN 9780973896510.
- (2008) Design and Inner drawings for "The Idler's Glossary," by Joshua Glenn and Mark Kingwell, Biblioasis, ISBN 978-1-897231-46-3.
- (2008) Cover art and design for the CD The Vinyl Cafe Storyland by Stuart McLean, Vinyl Cafe Productions, ISBN 9780973896527.
- (2009) Cover of The Criterion Collection's DVD release of Leo McCarey's Make Way for Tomorrow (spine #505).
- (2009) Cover art and design for the CD Planet Boy by Stuart McLean, Vinyl Cafe Productions, ISBN 9780973896534.
- (2010) Cover art and design for the CD Out and About by Stuart McLean, Vinyl Cafe Productions, ISBN 9780973896541.
- (2011) Design and Inner drawings for "The Wage Slave's Glossary", by Joshua Glenn and Mark Kingwell, Biblioasis, ISBN 978-1-926845-17-3.
- (2012) Cover and illustrations for Who Could That Be At This Hour? (All the Wrong Questions Book 1), by Lemony Snicket, Little, Brown.
- (2013) Cover of The Criterion Collection's Blu-ray/DVD release of Charlie Chaplin's City Lights (spine #680).
- (2013) Cover for the book Love, Dishonor, Marry, Cherish, Perish by David Rakoff, Doubleday, ISBN 978-0385535229
- (2013) Cover art and illustrations for the book Sunshine Sketches of a Little Town by Stephen Leacock, Skyhorse, ISBN 162636172X.
- (2013) Cover and illustrations for When Did You See Her Last? (All the Wrong Questions Book 2), by Lemony Snicket, Little, Brown.
- (2014) Cover and illustrations for Shouldn't You Be In School? (All the Wrong Questions Book 3), by Lemony Snicket, Little, Brown.
- (2014) Cover and illustrations for File Under: 13 Suspicious Incidents by Lemony Snicket, Little, Brown.
- (2015) Cover and illustrations for Why Is This Night Different From All Other Nights? (All the Wrong Questions Book 4), by Lemony Snicket, Little, Brown.
- (2017) Cover for the book The Dusty Bookcasez: A Journey Through Canada's Forgotten, Neglected, and Suppressed Writing by Brian Busby, Biblioasis.
- (2017) Christmas Ghost Stories (Charles Dickens' The Signalman, A. M. Burrage's One Who Saw, Marjorie Bowen's The Crown Derby Plate, Edith Wharton's Afterward, M. R. James's "The Diary of Mr. Poynter", E. F. Benson's How Fear Departed the Long Gallery, W. W. Jacobs' The Toll House, and Algernon Blackwood's The Empty House) designed and illustrated by Seth
- (2018) Cover of The Criterion Collection's Blu-ray and DVD release of Gregory La Cava's My Man Godfrey (spine #114).
- (2020) Cover art and design for the record I'd Rather Lead a Band by Loudon Wainwright III, Search Party.
- (2021) Cover, design, and illustration for "The Adventurer's Glossary", by Joshua Glenn and Mark Kingwell, McGill Queen's University Press, ISBN 022800831X.
- (2022) Cover and design for Radium Age series of reissues, edited by Joshua Glenn, MIT Press.
