= Aloud discography =

- Aloud performing in 2009.
- Studio albums: 6
- Extended plays: 6
- Soundtrack albums: 8
- Compilation albums: 3
- Singles: 40
- Video albums: 6
- Music videos: 23
- Other releases: 12

Aloud is an American indie rock band. The band was formed in Boston, Massachusetts in 2002 by principal vocalists and songwriters Jen de la Osa and Henry Beguiristain, accompanied by bassist Charles Murphy, drummer Chris Jago. Primarily a quartet for the majority of its existence, Aloud expanded their permanent lineup in 2017 to include saxophonist Alanah Ntzouras and trumpeter Vanessa Acosta. The band's songwriting and vocal abilities are often highlighted by critics. While generally known for a more energetic sound, Aloud changed tack and pared down their sound on their third studio album, Exile.

Their sixth studio album, Apollo 6, will be released on May 19, 2023.

== Studio albums ==
Year	Details
2006	Leave Your Light On: Label: Lemon Merchant Records (DTTR001); Released: May 2, 2006; Formats: CD, download
2008	Fan The Fury: Label: Lemon Merchant Records (DTTR002); Released: March 25, 2008; Formats: CD, download
2010	Exile: Label: Lemon Merchant Records (DTTR003); Released: October 12, 2010; Formats: CD, download
2014	It's Got To Be Now: Label: Mother West (MW0214); Released: April 1, 2014; Formats: CD, vinyl, download
2020	Sprezzatura: Label: Lemon Merchant Records (DTTR013); Released: May 8, 2020; Formats: CD, vinyl, download
2023	Apollo 6: Label: Lemon Merchant Records (DTTR029); Released: May 19, 2023; Formats: CD, vinyl, download

== EPs ==
Year	Details
2004	The Sooner It Comes: Label: Emaginary Records (ER79138), Lemon Merchant Records (DTTR000); Released: June 12, 2004; Formats: CD, download
2009	Live 2009: Label: Lemon Merchant Records (DTTR002B); Released: December 31, 2009; Formats: download
2019	City Lights: Label: Lemon Merchant Records (DTTR015); Released: November 29, 2019; Formats: download
2020	Dead Reckoning: Label: Lemon Merchant Records (DTTR019); Released: May 8, 2020; Formats: download
2021	Scenes From a Lonely Planet: Label: Lemon Merchant Records (DTTR023); Released: August 20, 2021; Formats: download
2024	Observer Affect: Label: Lemon Merchant Records (DTTR033); Released: December 6, 2024; Formats: vinyl, download

== Singles ==
Year	Title	Album
2004	"(Hey Now) What's It To You" b/w "Mind Relaxer"	The Sooner It Comes
2005	"All I Can Do"	Leave Your Light On
2006	"Beaches"	Leave Your Light On
2006	"Can You Hear Me Now?"	Leave Your Light On
2007	"Put on the Parka"	Non-album single
2008	"Fan The Fury"	Fan The Fury
2008	"Sometimes I Feel Like A Vampire"	Fan The Fury
2009	"Julie"	Fan The Fury
2009	"You Got Me Wrong"	Fan The Fury
2009	"Happy Effing Xmas"	Non-album single
2010	"Old Soldier"	Exile
2011	"Exile in the Night"	Exile
2011	"The Last Time [campfire version]"	Non-album single
2011	"The Cash and the Pearls" b/w "So Long"	Non-album single
2012	"You Will Know" b/w "Such A Long Time"	Non-album single
2013	"A Little Bit Low"	It's Got To Be Now
2014	"It's Got To Be Now"	It's Got To Be Now
2014	"Back Here With Me Again"	It's Got To Be Now
2015	"Ravens & Writing Desks"	Non-album single
2015	"Darkest Days (2015 Remix)"	Exile
2016	"The Wicked Kind"	It's Got To Be Now
2016	"The Wicked Kind (Emiliano Melis remix)"	It's Got To Be Now
2016	"Please Come Home for Christmas"	Non-album single
2017	"Agua Mala"	Non-album single
2017	"Empty House"/"Falling Out of Love" (vinyl only)	Non-album single
2018	"Falling Out of Love"/"Empty House"	Non-album single
2018	"Dead Flowers"	Non-album single
2018	"Son of the Dharma" b/w "Last of the Evergreens"	Non-album single
2019	"Children of the Divine" b/w "(I Just Want) To Be Free"	Non-album single
2019	"Live TV" b/w "Show Me What You Got"	Non-album single
2020	"Been So Long Since We've Seen the Sun"	Sprezzatura
2020	"Loving U's a Beautiful Thing"	Sprezzatura
2020	"Waiting (Scenes From a Lonely Planet)"	Sprezzatura
2020	"Hungry Land"	Sprezzatura
2022	"The Comeback Kid"	Apollo 6
2023	"Somewhere To Be"	Apollo 6
2023	"Meditation for the Housebound"	Apollo 6
2023	"Big Blue"	Apollo 6
2024	"The Sky's in Love With You"	Observer Affect
2024	"A Week Without Rain"	Observer Affect

== Videos ==
Year	Release details	Comments
2021	Scenes From a Lonely Planet: Label: Lemon Merchant; Released: May 15, 2021; Format: Digital	Concert film of a performance at South Endustries recording studio in Los Angeles, CA.
2021	Live at the Paramount Boston: Label: Lemon Merchant; Released: February 17, 2021; Format: Digital	Concert film of a performance at Boston's Paramount Theater on July 24, 2015.
2020	A Line of Lights: Label: Lemon Merchant; Released: October 16, 2020; Format: Digital	Concert film of Aloud's album release show for Exile in Boston, MA, on September 23, 2010. Released as part of the 10th anniversary celebration of Exile.
2015	Be Free of Your Past: Label: Lemon Merchant; Released: December 17, 2015; Format: Digital	Short film on the making of Aloud's third album Exile.
2008	Hard Up In The 2000s: Label: Lemon Merchant; Released: September 12, 2008; Format: Digital	Documentary film of the Spring leg of the Fan The Fury tour, which took place March – April 2008. Contains live performances and interviews with the band.
2004	Aloud: 2004 Year in Review: Released: December 2004; Format: CD-ROM	Short documentary on the recording of The Sooner It Comes and touring in 2004. The short was distributed to subscribers of Aloud's e-mail list. The CD-ROM also contained an audio interview on WMFO and bonus tracks.

== Music videos ==
Year	Title	Director
2006	"Beaches"	Tom Fitzgerald
2007	"Can You Hear Me Now?"	Tom Fitzgerald
2009	"Julie"	Chris March
2009	"You Got Me Wrong"	Annie Burns
2010	"Old Soldier"	Chris March
2011	"Exile in the Night"	Chris March
2012	"You Will Know"	Stephen LoVerme
2014	"It's Got To Be Now"	Erin Genett/Stephen LoVerme
2014	"Back Here With Me Again"	Erin Genett/Stephen LoVerme
2015	"A Little Bit Low"	Phil Healy/Adam Van Voorhis
2016	"The Wicked Kind"	Skye Von
2018	"Falling Out of Love"	Jen de la Osa/Henry Beguiristain
2018	"Dead Flowers"	Tanya Leal-Soto
2019	"Children of the Divine"	Ryan Taalbi
2019	"Live TV"	Frank Hegyi
2020	"Been So Long Since We've Seen the Sun"	
2020	"Loving U's a Beautiful Thing"	Matt Maguire
2021	"Waiting (Scenes From a Lonely Planet)"	Frank Hegyi
2021	"Cresting Waves"	Matt Maguire
2023	"Meditation for the Housebound"	
2023	"Big Blue"	Matt Maguire
2024	"The Sky's in Love With You"	
2024	"A Week Without Rain"	

== Soundtracks ==
Year	Details	Comments
2008	The Mixtress: Song: "Release"; Released: March 6, 2008; Studio: Wideshot Studios	Award-winning soundtrack to the short documentary by Wideshot Studios on Jules Bennett, aka "The Mixtress". Soundtrack also featured contributions from The Walkmen and The Cardigans.
2009	The Flying Scissors: Song: "Backs To The Wall (Instrumental)"; Released: November 6, 2009; Studio: Flying Penguin Pictures	
2013	Shotgun Wedding: Song: "Murder Will Out"; Released: March 31, 2013; Studio: Fox Digital Studio	
2015	The Mayor of Rock & Roll: Song: "A Little Bit Low"; Released: August 29, 2015; Studio: Broken Gates Films	
2018	All These Small Moments: Songs: "Jeanne, It's Just a Ride!", "Loving U's a Beautiful Thing" (film only); Released: April 24, 2018 (festival) January 18, 2019 (wide); Studio: Orion Classics	
2018	Kusama: Infinity: Song: "Such a Long Time"; Released: September 7, 2018; Studio: Magnolia Pictures	
2019	The Sympathy Card: Song: "Broken Hearts"; Released: June 22, 2019 (festival); Studio: Broken Gates Films	
2023	The List: Song: "Waiting (Scenes From a Lonely Planet)" (film only); Released: August 22, 2023; Studio: Nickel City Pictures/New Legend Entertainment	

== Compilations ==
Year	Details
2006	Wicked Good Boston Bands Vol. 2: Song: "Beaches"; Label: WFNX/Newbury Comics; Released: May 2006; Formats: CD
2013	Allston Pudding Presents Boston Marathon Relief Mixtape MMXIII: Song: "Justice & Forgiveness"; Label: Allston Pudding; Released: April 2013; Formats: Digital
2017	We Are Not Trump: Vol. 2: Song: "Backs To The Wall (WANT Version)"; Released: February 2017; Formats: Digital

== Other releases ==
Year	Details	Comments
2002	Don't Trust the Radio: Released: July 31, 2002; Formats: CD, cassette	Four song home-recorded demo, briefly sold at shows in 2002. Contained early versions of "Don't Trust the Radio", "Help Me Help You", and "Mind Relaxer", which would later appear on 2004's The Sooner It Comes.
2003	"Wouldn't You": Released: January 1, 2003; Formats: download	Home-recorded demo, released as a digital single and later included with Don't Trust the Radio.
2003	Pretty Little Picture: Released: March 21, 2003; Formats: CD	Studio demo, briefly sold at shows in 2003. Contained early versions of "Don't Trust the Radio" and "Help Me Help You", which would later appear on 2004's The Sooner It Comes.
2003	"Anybody (The Blues Song) [acoustic]": Released: c. September 2003; Formats: download	Home recorded acoustic version of "Anybody (The Blues Song)", originally found on Pretty Little Picture.
2003	Live at the Middle East: Released: November 21, 2003; Formats: CD	Live soundboard recording of Aloud at The Middle East in Cambridge, Massachusetts. While never officially released in its entirety by Aloud, the disc was briefly sold via The Middle East's website. Aloud also made four tracks available for download.
2004	Aloud: 2004 Year in Review: Released: December 2004; Formats: CD-ROM	Distributed to subscribers of Aloud's e-mail list. Contained an early version of "Late Last Nite", recorded during the sessions for The Sooner It Comes.
2009	Rock Out Boston Club Sampler: Released: May 12, 2009; Formats: CD	Exclusive sampler for Rock Out Boston Club. Contained the "campfire" version of "The Last Time", a live performance of "Sometimes I Feel Like A Vampire", and a previously unreleased song "Gone With the Rising Sun".
2012	10th Anniversary EP: Released: April 26, 2012; Formats: download	Exclusive EP released by The Boston Phoenix to commemorate Aloud's 10th anniversary, featuring four songs from previously released albums.
2014	This Will Make Sense Later: the It's Got To Be Now demos: Released: April 1, 2014; Formats: download	A collection of demos from It's Got To Be Now released exclusively to the album's Kickstarter backers. Contains demo recordings of all the songs on the album (except for "Back Here With Me Again") and "You Will Know", plus two previously unreleased compositions ("Edge City", "(I Just Want) To Be Free"). A studio version of "(I Just Want) To Be Free" would be released in 2019 as the b-side to "Children of the Divine".
2020	Shibusa: The Sprezzatura Demos: Released: May 8, 2020; Formats: download	A collection of demos from Sprezzatura, available with the "Deluxe" version of the album during the pre-order phase. Includes alternate mixes of "Salvage Yard", "Oh Danny", and "In Spite of Language" as bonus tracks.
2020	Shadows of Another Place: The Exile Demos: Released: October 16, 2020; Formats: download	A double-album collection of demos, bonus tracks, and previously unreleased music from the Exile era. Released as part of Exile: 10th Anniversary Edition.
2023	We Relay Light: The Apollo 6 Demos: Released: May 19, 2023; Formats: download	A collection of demos from Apollo 6, bundled with the "Deluxe" version of the album. Contains demos of songs featured on the album, studio recordings and demos for music not included on the album, and a booklet detailing the recording process.
