= Pale Horse and Rider =

Pale Horse and Rider was a short-lived collaboration between Jon DeRosa and Marc Gartman. Their recordings featured a variety of performers in supporting roles, including Alan Sparhawk (Low), Nathan Amundson (Rivulets), Charles Newman (Flare, Mother West), Paul Oldham (Palace Brothers) and Mike Pride.

== Background ==
The duo's albums received critical reception from publications, including AllMusic, which noted about These Are the New Good Times, "Through it all, DeRosa's songwriting blurs the line between urban and rural," and PopMatters, which remarked about their third studio album, "Moody Pike doesn't win over immediately, but keeps snuggling up to you like a wet dog until your defenses wear down, your sleeves and jeans sport damp patches, and the trivial cares of the day are shaken off like so many fine droplets."

== Discography ==
- The Alcohol EPs (1999)
- These Are the New Good Times (2003)
- Moody Pike (2004)
