= LD & the New Criticism =

- Origin: Brooklyn, New York
- Genres: Experimental; Countrypolitan; death pop
- Years active: 2005–2009
- Labels: Darla, Acuarela
- Past members: LD Beghtol: voice, guitar, baritone ukulele Jonathon "Chuck" Plummer: voice, mandolin, guitar Pinky Weitzman: Stroh violin, viola, whistle Jim Andralis: accordion Douglas Quint: bassoon Mason Patrick Brown III: guitar, mandolin, glockenspiel, accordion, finger cymbals, Hadley Kahn: drums

LD & the New Criticism was an American experimental pop band formed by songwriter/producer LD Beghtol. Designed by Beghtol to showcase his less dour songwriting efforts—and to be a highly portable, essentially "live band", unlike his other studio-based projects Flare and moth wranglers—the outfit performed extensively in the New York area, and were a featured band at the 2007 Primavera Sound Festival in Barcelona, Spain. Noted aspects of LD&TNC's live shows were the use of old-fashioned "radio mic'ing" (with the performers clustered around two microphones, in an arc) and their lack of electric bass and drums. The band also contributed the track "Sex Surrogate" to the "ESOPUS 6" invitational CD, Help Wanted, along with Devendra Banhart, Grizzly Bear, and others.

== Discography ==
- Tragic Realism, full-length CD (Darla, 2006; Acuarela, 2006)
- Amoral Certitudes, seven-song ep (Acuarela, 2007)
