= It's Got to Be Now =

It's Got To Be Now

Studio album by Aloud
- Released: April 1, 2014
- Recorded: December 12, 2011; December 10–11, 2012; December 20–22, 2012; January 24, 2013
- Studio: Mad Oak Studios, Allston, MA; Serious Business, New York, NY
- Genre: Indie rock
- Length: 29:43
- Label: Mother West
- Producer: Charles Newman, Benny Grotto, Aloud

Aloud chronology
Exile (2010)	It's Got To Be Now (2014)	Sprezzatura (2020)

Singles from It's Got To Be Now
- 1. "A Little Bit Low" Released: December 20, 2013; 2. "It's Got To Be Now" Released: February 26, 2014; 3. "Back Here With Me Again" Released: July 22, 2014; 4. "The Wicked Kind" Released: September 12, 2016

Professional ratings
Review scores
Source	Rating
Boston Globe	favorable
Pop Underground	favorable

It's Got To Be Now is the fourth studio album by the Boston indie rock band Aloud. The album was co-produced by Charles Newman, Benny Grotto, and Aloud.

In a blog post, the band foreshadowed it would be "an album that sounds like a band playing music in a room together", a marked departure from the ornate Exile. It's Got To Be Now is Aloud's first album of new material with a permanent rhythm section since their 2008 album Fan The Fury. It is also the first Aloud album available on vinyl and their debut on Mother West.

On July 31, 2013, the band announced a Kickstarter campaign to fund the album. Throughout the campaign, live performances of songs "The Wicked Kind", the title track "It's Got To Be Now", "A Little Bit Low", and "Back Here With Me Again" were released. Acoustic versions of "Jeanne, It's Just a Ride!" and "Don't Let It Get You Down" were also posted. The project reached its funding goal on August 21, 2013.

The album's first single, "A Little Bit Low", premiered online in Elmore Magazine on December 20, 2013, with the music video debuting on February 15, 2015. A second single, the title track "It's Got To Be Now", debuted at GroundSounds on February 26, 2014. A music video for the "Back Here With Me Again", the third single, was filmed at Aloud's Boston release show for the album, and was first posted July 22, 2014 on Vanyaland. It was the first video released in connection with It's Got To Be Now to feature the band.

== Recording ==
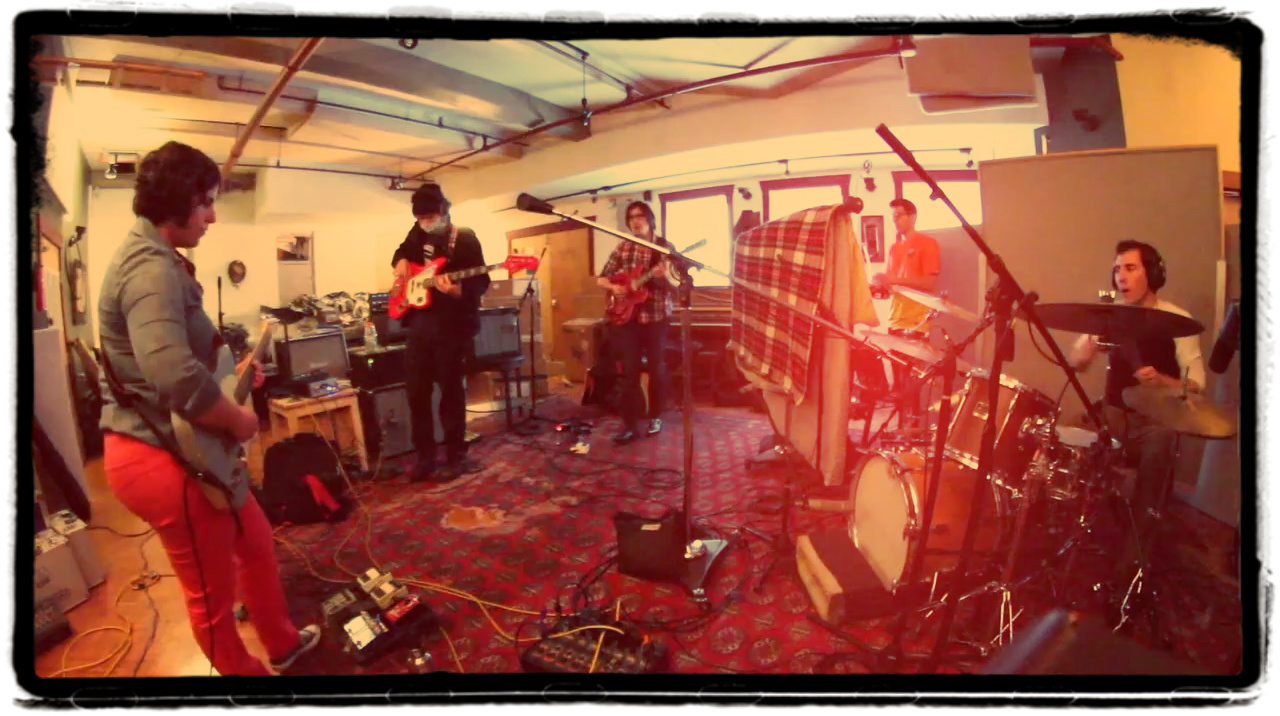
Aloud recording It's Got To Be Now at Mad Oak Studios. The vast majority of the album was recorded in this configuration.

After recording "You Will Know" for the Berklee College of Music's BANDED project, Aloud found the prospect of working with Benny Grotto at Mad Oak Studios to be a very enjoyable, productive experience. The band reconvened at the studio to record "Such a Long Time" in December 2011. At the behest of Grotto, the band recorded the song in the same room without any click track, headphones, or separation of instruments. Plans were made throughout 2012 to return to Mad Oak with Grotto to record a follow-up to Exile once more songs had been written.

Aloud formally began sessions for It's Got To Be Now at Mad Oak nearly a year later. They recorded nine more songs over the course of two days in the studio. Percussionist Andy G. Wong was invited to record percussion with the band to maintain the live feel of the recording.

The following week, vocalists de la Osa and Beguiristain traveled to New York City to overdub vocals for the album at Serious Business Studios with producer Charles Newman.

Aloud held one more overdub session, at Mad Oak, on January 24, 2013 to overdub "some odds and ends", which included keyboards recorded by Maxwell Butler.

== Track listing ==
=== It's Got To Be Now ===
All tracks are written by Jen de la Osa and Henry Beguiristain.

No.	Title	Length
1.	"Back Here With Me Again"	3:02
2.	"Don't Let It Get You Down"	3:05
3.	"The Wicked Kind"	3:32
4.	"Jeanne, It's Just a Ride!"	2:38
5.	"A Little Bit Low"	3:06
6.	"Such a Long Time"	2:37
7.	"After the Plague"	3:18
8.	"It's Got to Be Now"	3:05
9.	"Complicity"	2:22
10.	"The Ballad of Emily Jane"	2:59
11.	"You Will Know" (digital bonus track)	3:18

=== This Will Make Sense Later: the It's Got To Be Now demos ===
An exclusive collection of demos was released to backers who crowdfunded It's Got To Be Now via Kickstarter. The collection contains demos and alternate recordings for all but one song on the album ("Back Here With Me Again") plus the bonus track "You Will Know". Demos of two previously unreleased songs, "Edge City" and "(I Just Want) To Be Free", were also included. A studio version of "(I Just Want)" To Be Free was later released as the b-side to "Children of the Divine" and included on the City Lights EP in 2019.

All tracks are written by Jen de la Osa and Henry Beguiristain.

No.	Title	Length
1.	"Complicity" (demo)	2:32
2.	"After the Plague" (studio demo)	3:25
3.	"Don't Let it Get You Down" (rehearsal)	3:32
4.	"The Ballad of Emily Jane" (demo)	2:11
5.	"A Little Bit Low" (rehearsal)	3:42
6.	"You Will Know" (demo)	4:57
7.	"It's Got To Be Now" (rehearsal)	3:06
8.	"Such a Long Time" (demo)	2:47
9.	"Jeanne, It's Just a Ride!" (rehearsal)	2:35
10.	"The Wicked Kind" (rehearsal)	3:40
11.	"Edge City" (demo)	4:16
12.	"(I Just Want) To Be Free" (demo)	4:18

== Personnel ==
Aloud

- Henry Beguiristain: lead vocals, guitars
- Jen de la Osa: lead vocals, guitars
- Frank Hegyi: drums, percussion
- Charles Murphy: bass, backing vocals

Additional personnel

- Maxwell Butler: organ, piano
- Ryan Cornell: mixing
- Tony Eichler: mastering
- Benny Grotto: producer, recording engineer
- Thayer Harris: additional engineering on "Such a Long Time"
- Charles Newman: producer, mixing
- Mike Tucker: drums, percussion on "Such a Long Time"
- Andy G. Wong: live percussion
