= These Are the New Good Times =

Studio album by Pale Horse and Rider
- Released: March 11, 2003
- Recorded: July 1, 2002 – October 31, 2002
- Genre: Indie rock, americana
- Length: 37:20
- Label: Darla Records
- Producer: Charles Newman

Pale Horse and Rider chronology
These Are the New Good Times (2003)	Moody Pike (2004)

Professional ratings
Review scores
Source	Rating
AllMusic	4/5 stars
Delusions of Adequacy	(favorable)
Fakejazz	10/12
Harp	(favorable)
Pitchfork	6.3/10
PopMatters	(favorable)

These Are the New Good Times is the debut release from Pale Horse and Rider, a Jon DeRosa side-project with Marc Gartman. It was released in 2003 via Darla Records. Alan Sparhawk of Low and Nathan Amundson of Rivulets were guest performers on the recording.

== Track listing ==
1. "Jersey Coast Line" – 3:43
2. "I Told Jesus Christ How Much I Love Her" – 3:54
3. "Will We Be Blessed Someday" – 2:56
4. "Sunday Matinee" – 4:03
5. "Stars" – 5:23
6. "Past Life" – 2:33
7. "Aura Lee" – 3:33
8. "Coney Island" – 2:01
9. "Metropolitan Love Song" – 2:27
10. "I Came Here Every Night" – 2:24
11. "The Prettiest Girl I've Seen Tonight (So Far)" – 4:23
