= 69 Love Songs =

Studio album by the Magnetic Fields
- Released: September 7, 1999
- Recorded: April 1999
- Studios: Polar West, Mother West, Polar Mother, and Sonics
- Genres: Indie pop; indie folk; synth-pop; chamber pop; art pop; experimental pop; alternative country; twee pop
- Length: 172:03
- Label: Merge
- Producer: Stephin Merritt

The Magnetic Fields chronology
Get Lost (1995)	69 Love Songs (1999)	i (2004)

69 Love Songs is the sixth studio album by American indie pop band the Magnetic Fields, released on September 7, 1999, by Merge Records. As its title indicates, 69 Love Songs is a three-volume concept album composed of 69 love songs, all written by Magnetic Fields frontman Stephin Merritt.

== Conception and live performance ==
69 Love Songs was originally conceived as a music revue. Stephin Merritt was sitting in a gay piano bar in Manhattan, listening to the pianist's interpretations of Stephen Sondheim songs, when he decided he ought to get into theatre music because he felt he had an aptitude for it. "I decided I'd write one hundred love songs as a way of introducing myself to the world. Then I realized how long that would be. So I settled on sixty-nine. I'd have a theatrical revue with four drag queens. And whoever the audience liked best at the end of the night would get paid." He also found inspiration in Charles Ives' 114 Songs, about which he had read earlier in the day: "songs of all kinds, and what a monument it was, and I thought, well, I could do something like that."

Other influences on 69 Love Songs included Fleetwood Mac, Billie Holiday and Orchestral Manoeuvres in the Dark. Merritt wrote much of the album at Dick's Bar in New York, saying that he was "literally there eight hours a day, writing".

On seven occasions (five in the United States and two in London over four consecutive nights) the Magnetic Fields performed all 69 love songs, in order, over two nights. Several of the lavish orchestrations are more simply arranged when performed live, due to limited performers and/or equipment.

== Genres and themes ==
Merritt has said "69 Love Songs is not remotely an album about love. It's an album about love songs, which are very far away from anything to do with love." The album features songs in many different genres, including country, synth-pop, free jazz, and mournful love ballads. All the songs deal with love in one form or another, but often in an ironic or off-beat fashion, such as the track "Yeah! Oh, Yeah!" which tells the story of a husband murdering his wife. The songs on 69 Love Songs feature lyrics exploring heterosexual, homosexual, and bisexual relationships.

== Release ==
The album was initially released in the United States by Merge on September 7, 1999, as a box set with a booklet containing a Merritt interview by Daniel Handler, and as three separate individual volumes—catalogue numbers MRG166 (Vol. 1), MRG167 (Vol. 2), MRG168 (Vol. 3), and MRG169 (box set). On May 29, 2000, the album was released by Circus (CIR CD003) in Europe and Australia without the booklet insert. It was reissued in the United Kingdom through Domino as REWIGCD18.

On April 20, 2010, Merge released a limited edition 6×10" vinyl version limited to 1,000 copies.

== Critical reception ==
Professional ratings
Aggregate scores
Source	Rating
Metacritic	88/100
Review scores
Source	Rating
AllMusic	4.5/5 stars
Entertainment Weekly	A
The Guardian	5/5 stars
Mojo	5/5 stars
NME	8/10
Pitchfork	9.0/10
Q	4/5 stars
Rolling Stone	3/5 stars
Spin	10/10
The Village Voice	A+

69 Love Songs received widespread acclaim from music critics. At Metacritic, which assigns a normalized rating out of 100 to reviews from mainstream critics, the album received an average score of 88, indicating "universal acclaim". Betty Clarke of The Guardian hailed it as "an album of such tenderness, humour and bloody-minded diversity, it'll have you throwing away your preconceptions and wondering how you ever survived a broken heart without it." In Spin, Douglas Wolk lauded the album as Merritt's "masterwork" and stated that "pop hasn't seen a lyricist of Merritt's kind and caliber since Cole Porter", praising his unique takes on standard love song clichés. Pitchfork's Nick Mirov wrote that Merritt "has proven himself as an exceptional songwriter, making quantum leaps in quality as well as quantity on 69 Love Songs." Robert Christgau, writing for The Village Voice, stated that despite his personal dislike of cynicism and reluctance to "link it to creative exuberance", the album's "cavalcade of witty ditties—one-dimensional by design, intellectual when it feels like it, addicted to cheap rhymes, cheaper tunes, and token arrangements, sung by nonentities whose vocal disabilities keep their fondness for pop theoretical—upends my preconceptions the way high art's sposed to."

69 Love Songs was voted second place in The Village Voice's annual Pazz & Jop critics' poll for 1999, behind Moby's Play. The poll's creator Robert Christgau selected it as the best album of the year in his "Dean's List". It was ranked at number 465 in Rolling Stone's 2012 list of the 500 greatest albums of all time, and at number 406 in the 2020 edition of the list. 69 Love Songs was further ranked at number 213 in NME's 2013 list of the 500 all-time greatest albums. It was also included in the book 1001 Albums You Must Hear Before You Die. In 2024, Mark Beaumont stated that 69 Love Songs "will remain underrated until it's consistently mentioned in the same breaths as Pet Sounds and the White Album."

According to Nielsen SoundScan, as of 2015 the three-volume boxed set has sold 83,000 copies, with an additional 58,000 for volume one, 34,000 for volume two, and 29,000 for volume three.

== 69 Love Songs, A Field Guide ==
LD Beghtol's explication of 69 Love Songs (ISBN 0-8264-1925-9) was released on December 15, 2006, by Continuum International Publishing Group as part of their 33 1/3 series of books on influential pop/rock albums.

The book includes studio anecdotes, an extensive annotated lexicon of words and phrases culled from the album's lyrics, performance notes from the band, fans, and friends, full-album shows in New York, Boston, and London, rare and unpublished images by chickfactor editor/photographer Gail O'Hara, and other items such as a crossword puzzle created by TMF/Flare associate Jon DeRosa and a scathing list of academic cant words not otherwise used in Beghtol's book.

Also featured is a candid interview with the songwriter, styled as a surrealist radio play, in which Stephin Merritt answers questions about his Chihuahua Irving Berlin Merritt, his sex life, studio practices, and other esoterica.

== Notable cover versions ==
"The Book of Love" was covered by Peter Gabriel; this cover version was featured in Scrubs during the season 8 final episode, "My Finale", the 2004 movie Shall We Dance?, and the South Park episode "Tweek x Craig". Taylor Hickinson covered the song as her character Raelle Collar in the Freeform series Motherland: Fort Salem. Ana Gasteyer recorded a version of the song for her 2014 CD I’m Hip. "The Book of Love" had also been covered by The Airborne Toxic Event. Olivia Rodrigo covered "The Book of Love" for War Child Records’ 2026 Help(2) charity album, a benefit for people affected by war and crisis in Gaza, Sudan, Ukraine, Syria, Yemen, and the Democratic Republic of Congo.

"Papa Was a Rodeo" was covered by Kelly Hogan and the Pine Valley Cosmonauts on the 1999 Bloodshot Records album Beneath the Country Underdog. This song was also covered by Orville Peck, Molly Tuttle, and Golden Highway on the 2024 album Stampede.

"Meaningless" was covered by John Congleton's project The Nighty Nite on the 2011 EP Dimples.

"My Only Friend" was covered by Deadsy and featured on the soundtrack for the 2005 film Winter Passing.

"I Think I Need a New Heart" was covered by Black Country, New Road for the vinyl only EP Never Again Part 2.

"I Don't Want to Get Over You" was covered by Superchunk in 2025.

== Track listing ==
All lead vocals by Stephin Merritt except where noted. All tracks are written by Merritt.

Volume one
No.	Title	Lead vocals	Length
1.	"Absolutely Cuckoo"		1:34
2.	"I Don't Believe in the Sun"		4:16
3.	"All My Little Words"	LD Beghtol	2:46
4.	"A Chicken With Its Head Cut Off"		2:41
5.	"Reno Dakota"	Claudia Gonson	1:05
6.	"I Don't Want to Get Over You"		2:22
7.	"Come Back from San Francisco"	Shirley Simms	2:48
8.	"The Luckiest Guy on the Lower East Side"	Dudley Klute	3:43
9.	"Let's Pretend We're Bunny Rabbits"		2:25
10.	"The Cactus Where Your Heart Should Be"		1:11
11.	"I Think I Need a New Heart"		2:32
12.	"The Book of Love"		2:42
13.	"Fido, Your Leash Is Too Long"		2:33
14.	"How Fucking Romantic"	Klute	0:58
15.	"The One You Really Love"	Merritt, Beghtol	2:53
16.	"Punk Love"		0:58
17.	"Parades Go By"		2:56
18.	"Boa Constrictor"	Simms	0:58
19.	"A Pretty Girl Is Like..."		1:50
20.	"My Sentimental Melody"	Beghtol	3:07
21.	"Nothing Matters When We're Dancing"		2:27
22.	"Sweet-Lovin' Man"	Gonson	5:00
23.	"The Things We Did and Didn't Do"		2:10
Total length:			55:57

Volume two
No.	Title	Lead vocals	Length
1.	"Roses"	Beghtol	0:27
2.	"Love Is Like Jazz"		2:55
3.	"When My Boy Walks Down the Street"		2:38
4.	"Time Enough for Rocking When We're Old"		2:03
5.	"Very Funny"	Klute	1:26
6.	"Grand Canyon"		2:28
7.	"No One Will Ever Love You"	Simms	3:13
8.	"If You Don't Cry"	Gonson	3:06
9.	"You're My Only Home"		2:17
10.	"(Crazy for You But) Not That Crazy"		2:18
11.	"My Only Friend"		2:00
12.	"Promises of Eternity"		3:46
13.	"World Love"		3:07
14.	"Washington, D.C."	Gonson	1:53
15.	"Long-Forgotten Fairytale"	Klute	3:37
16.	"Kiss Me Like You Mean It"	Simms	2:00
17.	"Papa Was a Rodeo"	Merritt, Simms	5:00
18.	"Epitaph for My Heart"		2:50
19.	"Asleep and Dreaming"		1:53
20.	"The Sun Goes Down and the World Goes Dancing"		2:46
21.	"The Way You Say Good-Night"	Beghtol	2:44
22.	"Abigail, Belle of Kilronan"		2:00
23.	"I Shatter"		3:10
Total length:			59:40

Volume three
No.	Title	Lead vocals	Length
1.	"Underwear"	Merritt, Klute	2:49
2.	"It's a Crime"	Klute	3:54
3.	"Busby Berkeley Dreams"		3:36
4.	"I'm Sorry I Love You"	Simms	3:06
5.	"Acoustic Guitar"	Gonson	2:37
6.	"The Death of Ferdinand de Saussure"		3:10
7.	"Love in the Shadows"		2:54
8.	"Bitter Tears"	Beghtol	2:51
9.	"Wi' Nae Wee Bairn Ye'll Me Beget"		1:55
10.	"Yeah! Oh, Yeah!"	Merritt, Gonson	2:19
11.	"Experimental Music Love"		0:29
12.	"Meaningless"		2:08
13.	"Love Is Like a Bottle of Gin"		1:46
14.	"Queen of the Savages"		2:12
15.	"Blue You"	Klute	3:03
16.	"I Can't Touch You Anymore"		3:05
17.	"Two Kinds of People"		1:10
18.	"How to Say Goodbye"		2:48
19.	"The Night You Can't Remember"		2:17
20.	"For We Are the King of the Boudoir"	Beghtol	1:14
21.	"Strange Eyes"	Simms	2:01
22.	"Xylophone Track"		2:47
23.	"Zebra"	Gonson	2:15
Total length:			56:26

== Personnel ==
The Magnetic Fields

- Stephin Merritt – vocals, Digitech vocalist, Roland harmonizer, vocoder, ukulele, baritone ukulele, classical guitar, acoustic-electric 12-string guitar, lap steel, fado guitar, electric guitar, bass, mandolin, autoharp, marxophone, ukelin, tremoloa, violin-uke, sitar, zither, violin, musical saw, keyboards, synclavier, piano, harmonium, Wurlitzer electric piano, organ, rhythm units, recorder, ocarina, pennywhistle, Maestro wind synthesizer, melodica, Paul Revere jug, rumba box, xylophone, kalimbas, drum kit, rain stick, chimes, maracas, conga, bongos, triangle, bells, tambourine, washboard, steel drum, Chicken Shakers, finger cymbals, springs and Slinky guitar, pipes, bamboo harp, spirit chaser, sleighbells, fingersnaps, thunder sheet, cabasas, cowbells, gong
- Sam Davol – cello, flute
- Claudia Gonson – piano; drums; percussion; lead vocals on "Reno Dakota", "Sweet-Lovin' Man", "If You Don't Cry", "Washington, D.C.", "Acoustic Guitar", and "Zebra"; other backing vocals; duet with Merritt and guitar on "Yeah! Oh, Yeah!"; arrangement on "Very Funny", "World Love", and "Busby Berkeley Dreams"; whistling on "Blue You"
- John Woo – banjo, lead guitar, mandolin, bass on "Time Enough for Rocking When We're Old"

Additional musicians

- LD Beghtol – harmonium on "Xylophone Track", lead vocals on "All My Little Words", "My Sentimental Melody", "Roses", "The Way You Say Good-Night", "Bitter Tears", and "For We Are the King of the Boudoir"; duet with Merritt on "The One You Really Love"; other backing vocals; graphic design of box and book
- Chris Ewen – backing tracks and arrangement on "Promises of Eternity" and "It's a Crime", theremin on "Blue You"
- Daniel Handler – accordion, keyboards, arrangement on "Asleep and Dreaming"
- Dudley Klute – lead vocals on "The Luckiest Guy on the Lower East Side", "How Fucking Romantic", "Very Funny", "Long-Forgotten Fairytale", "It's a Crime", and "Blue You"; duet with Merritt on "Underwear"; other backing vocals
- Ida Pearle – violin on "The Luckiest Guy on the Lower East Side"
- Shirley Simms – duet with Merritt on "Papa Was a Rodeo", vocals on "Come Back from San Francisco", "Boa Constrictor", "No One Will Ever Love You", "Kiss Me Like You Mean It", "I'm Sorry I Love You", and "Strange Eyes"; other backing vocals

Production

- Jon Berman – engineering
- Chris Ewen – engineering
- Claudia Gonson – engineering
- Jeff Lipton – mastering
- Eric Masunaga – engineering
- Stephin Merritt – production, engineering
- Charles Newman – engineering

== Charts ==
Chart (2000)	Peak position
UK Albums (Official Charts)	170
