= Live 2009 =

Live 2009 may refer to:

- Live 2009 (Mostly Autumn album)
- Live 2009, Wayne Toups & Zydecajun
- Live 2009 (EP), an EP by Aloud
