= Moody Pike =

Studio album by Pale Horse and Rider
- Released: May 13, 2004
- Recorded: Summer, 2003
- Genre: Indie rock, americana
- Length: 57:38
- Label: Darla Records (US); Agenda Music (UK)

Pale Horse and Rider chronology
| These Are the New Good Times (2003) | Moody Pike (2004) |

Professional ratings
Review scores
| Source | Rating |
|---|---|
| Delusions of Adequacy | (favorable) |
| Fakejazz | 9/12 |
| Harp | (favorable) |
| PopMatters | (favorable) |
| Uncut | 3/5 stars |

Moody Pike, the second studio album from Pale Horse and Rider, featured Gerald Menke (ex-Mercury Rev), Mike Pride, as well as Palace Brothers' Paul Oldham. This was the last recording from the group as its members have gone on to focus on other projects.

== Track listing ==
1. "Stoned In The Evening" – 3:51
2. "Lovely Lace" – 2:04
3. "Bruises Like Badges" – 4:21
4. "Quarters" – 3:20
5. "Annabelle" – 4:45
6. "In The Cold Of Your Room" – 3:02
7. "Weight Of My Soul" – 7:40
8. "Winter Slides" – 4:17
9. "Route 224" – 3:01
10. "The Drinking Boy" – 5:17
