= Leave a Light On =

Leave a Light On may refer to:

- "Leave a Light On" (Belinda Carlisle song), 1989
- "Leave a Light On" (Tom Walker song), 2018
- "Leave a Light On" (Grey's Anatomy), a 2020 episode of the series
- "Leave a Light On (Talk Away the Dark)", a 2022 song by Papa Roach
- "Leave a Light On", a 2021 song by Japanese Wallpaper
- Leave a Light On, a 2014 album by 7 Seconds

== See also ==
- Leave the Light On (disambiguation)
- Leave Your Light On, a 2006 studio album by Aloud
