= Leave the Light On =

Leave the Light On may refer to:

- Leave the Light On (Lorrie Morgan album), a 1989 album by Lorrie Morgan
- Leave the Light On (Beth Hart album), a 2003 album by Beth Hart
- Leave the Light On (Chris Smither album), a 2006 album by Chris Smither
- Leave the Light On (Jeff Bates album), a 2006 album by Jeff Bates
- Leave the Light On (EP), a 2022 EP by Bailey Zimmerman
- Leave the Light On (memoir), the second memoir written by Jennifer Storm
- "Leave the Light On", a 1998 song by Lagwagon

== See also ==
- Leave a Light On (disambiguation)
- Leave Your Light On, Aloud's 2006 debut album
