= Mother West =

- Founded: 1990
- Founder: Charles Newman & Paul Casanova
- Country of origin: United States
- Location: New York City
- Official website: http://motherwest.com/

Mother West is a record label based in New York City and Los Angeles. It was founded in 1990 by Charles Newman and Paul Casanova as a vehicle to release the first record, Noreally Thanks, for their band Please. Since then and under the helm of Newman, Mother West has grown from a small label and recording studio to a full-service organization offering music licensing, publicity and promotions, customized distribution, online sales and state of the art recording facilities. The company now works with artists including The Magnetic Fields, Flare, AM, Gospel Music, Kris Gruen, Sweet Undertow, The Davenports, and Dylan Trees.

== Artists ==
- Aarktica
- Aloud
- Aluminum Babe
- AM
- Austin Hartley-Leonard
- Bela
- Bob Sharkey
- Bryan Fenkart
- Ceramic
- Charles Newman
- Codachrome
- Cold Blood Club
- Dead Leaves Rising
- Dylan Trees
- Earlymay
- Electric Ladybugs
- Escapade
- Flare
- Growch
- Industrial Tepee
- James Marks
- JC Milo
- Jon DeRosa
- Jubei
- Kelly Snyder
- Kris Gruen
- Lauren Molina
- Litvar
- Lost Tricks
- M-16
- Outta Luck
- Pale Horse and Rider
- Peter Fand
- Please
- Plexus
- Radio America
- Red Radio
- The Ritchie White Orchestra
- Sam Barron
- Scott Conners
- Shannon Corey
- Speed Dial
- Stuart Hart
- The Bowmans
- The Davenports
- The Domestics
- Teddy Grey
- The Old Nationals
- The Sound of Monday
- The Ton-Ups
- The Walkup
- Tom Shaner
- Transmissions From The Speaker Zone
- Tremulous Monk
- Vidi Vitties
- VJS Productions

== See also ==
- List of record labels
