= Radio America =

Radio America may refer to

- Radio America (United States)
- Radio America (Honduras)
- Radio America (band)
- Radio America (film), a 2015 American film by Christopher Showerman
