= Gail O'Hara =

- Born: Washington, D.C., United States
- Genre: Indie pop
- Occupations: photographer writer/editor/publisher label owner filmmaker
- Years active: 1980s–present
- Label: Enchanté
- Website: http://chickfactor.com

Gail O'Hara is an American editor, writer, photographer, recording label owner and filmmaker. She has worked at the Washington City Paper, SPIN, Time Out New York, ELLEgirl, EW, Modern Painters, Kinfolk and other publications.

== Career ==
=== chickfactor ===
O'Hara co-founded chickfactor magazine in 1992 with indie-pop singer Pam Berry (Black Tambourine, glo-worm, The Pines, Bright Coloured Lights, the Shapiros, etc.). chickfactor staged marathon indie-pop parties at several East Coast venues. The fanzine/magazine championed British pop that was otherwise neglected or disregarded by US mainstream pop critics. It also covered British/C86 bands like The Wedding Present (whose frontman David Gedge inspired the first issue of chickfactor), Heavenly, Pooh Sticks, and Saint Etienne, as well as US indie bands like Unrest, Tiger Trap, Small Factory, Honey Bunch, Pavement, and the Slumberland scene. chickfactor featured the comic Pavement Boy by Shawn Belschwender. chickfactor ran in print from 1992 to 2002 and also exists as a blog. A new paper issue, chickfactor 18, was published in 2018 and chickfactor continues to set up small festivals around the world.

=== Photography ===
O'Hara’s photos are on the cover/artwork of The Magnetic Fields' 69 Love Songs, as well as on records by The Clientele, Dump, The Pacific Ocean and the Would-Be-Goods, among others. After moving to New York in 1992, she started taking photos of musicians for chickfactor and other publications. Through this she has amassed an archive of images of indie musicians, artists and writers. O'Hara is one of the models on the cover of The Magnetic Fields' Get Lost as well. Her photos have appeared in the New York Times, The Times, the Washington Post, the Washington City Paper, Time Out, Time Out NY, CMJ, the Village Voice, Magnet, LGNY, Pulse, Rockpile, HX, Billboard and several books: Our Noise: The Story of Merge Records and 69 Love Songs: A Field Guide. She had her first photo exhibition at Ladyfest 2000 in Olympia, WA, and a solo show at Other Music the same year.

=== Strange Powers ===
O'Hara co-directed and co-produced Strange Powers: Stephin Merritt and the Magnetic Fields (2010), along with co-director/co-producer Kerthy Fix. The film contains footage filmed from 1999 to 2009 by O'Hara and Fix. Strange Powers had its US premiere at the South by Southwest Film Festival in March 2010, and has continued to tour at festivals including Full Frame, London Film Festival, and the Seattle International Film Festival. The DVD was released in May 2011.

=== Enchanté Records ===
O'Hara founded Enchanté Records in 1993 after Connie Lovatt from Alkaline and Fontaine Toups from Versus formed a band called Containe and had their first show at a chickfactor party in New York. Enchanté released two records by Containe: 1994's I Want It All EP and 1997's LP Only Cowards Walk Like Cowards; and two records by Connie Lovatt and Edward Baluyut's band The Pacific Ocean: 1998's Birds Don't Think They're Flying and 2000's Less Than The Needle, More Than The Shotgun. Enchanté released a compilation in 2002 titled All's Fair in Love and... chickfactor featuring chickfactor favorites, including Pipas, Dump, The Would-Be-Goods, The Magnetic Fields, The Pacific Ocean, Low, The Pines, The Clientele, The Aislers Set, Foxgloves, Marine Research, Graeme Downes (Verlaines), The Cannanes with Astra, and many others.

=== Writing and editing ===
Along with editing chickfactor, O'Hara was the Music Editor of Time Out New York where she hired Stephin Merritt, LD Beghtol, Claudia Gonson, Bob Bannister, Franklin Bruno and other musicians to write alongside the regular critics. She has also worked at SPIN magazine, the Washington City Paper, ELLEgirl magazine, Entertainment Weekly, Monocle, CNN Traveller, Happy, Modern Painters, Interview, CMJ, Salon and had a regular pop music column in the Times of London. Additionally, O'Hara has written liner notes for several Saint Etienne projects.
