= Jon DeRosa =

American musician (born 1978)

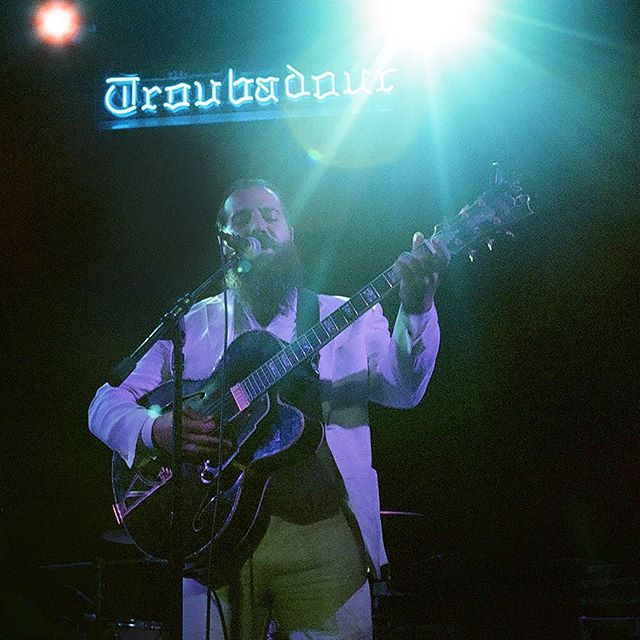
- DeRosa in 2015

Background information
- Born: Jon Anthony DeRosa; December 21, 1978 (age 47)
- Origin: Lodi, New Jersey, U.S.
- Genres: Indie rock, post-rock, ambient, electronic, experimental, shoegaze, Americana
- Occupations: Musician, singer-songwriter
- Instruments: Vocals, guitar, bass, keyboards, percussion, programming, sampler, tambura, pump organ
- Years active: 1996–present
- Labels: Brighter, Projekt, Darla, Silber, Rocket Girl
- Website: jonderosa.com

Jon Anthony DeRosa (born December 21, 1978) is an American musician and singer-songwriter. He has been involved with several musical acts, including Dead Leaves Rising, Pale Horse and Rider, and as well as his solo-project known as Aarktica.

His most recent solo album Black Halo was released on May 25, 2015, on Rocket Girl Records. The album was produced by longtime collaborator Charles Newman and features a song co-written by Stephen Merritt of The Magnetic Fields.

== Music career ==
=== Jon DeRosa Solo discography ===
- Anchored EP (2011)
- A Wolf in Preacher's Clothes (2012)
- Black Halo (2015)

=== Aarktica Discography ===
- In Sea Remixes Silber Records (2010)
- In Sea | Silber Records (2009)
- Matchless Years CD | Darla Records (2007)
- Live at KUCI (digital release) | Silber Records (2006)
- Bleeding Light | Darla Records (2005)
- Pure Tone Audiometry | Silber Records (2003)
- Or you could just go through your whole life… | Darla Records (2002)
- Morning One CD EP | Ochre Records (2001)
- No Solace in Sleep CD | Silber Records (2000)

=== Pale Horse and Rider ===
Pale Horse and Rider was a short-lived collaboration between DeRosa and Marc Gartman. Their recordings featured a variety of performers in supporting roles, including Alan Sparhawk (Low), Nathan Amundson (Rivulets), Charles Newman (Flare, Mother West), Paul Oldham (Palace Brothers) and Mike Pride.

=== Discography ===
- Moody Pike CD | Darla Records (US) | Agenda Records (UK) (2005)
- These Are The New Good Times | Darla Records (2003)
- The Alcohol EP | Silber Records (2002)
