= Charles Newman (music producer) =

Musical artist (born 1967)

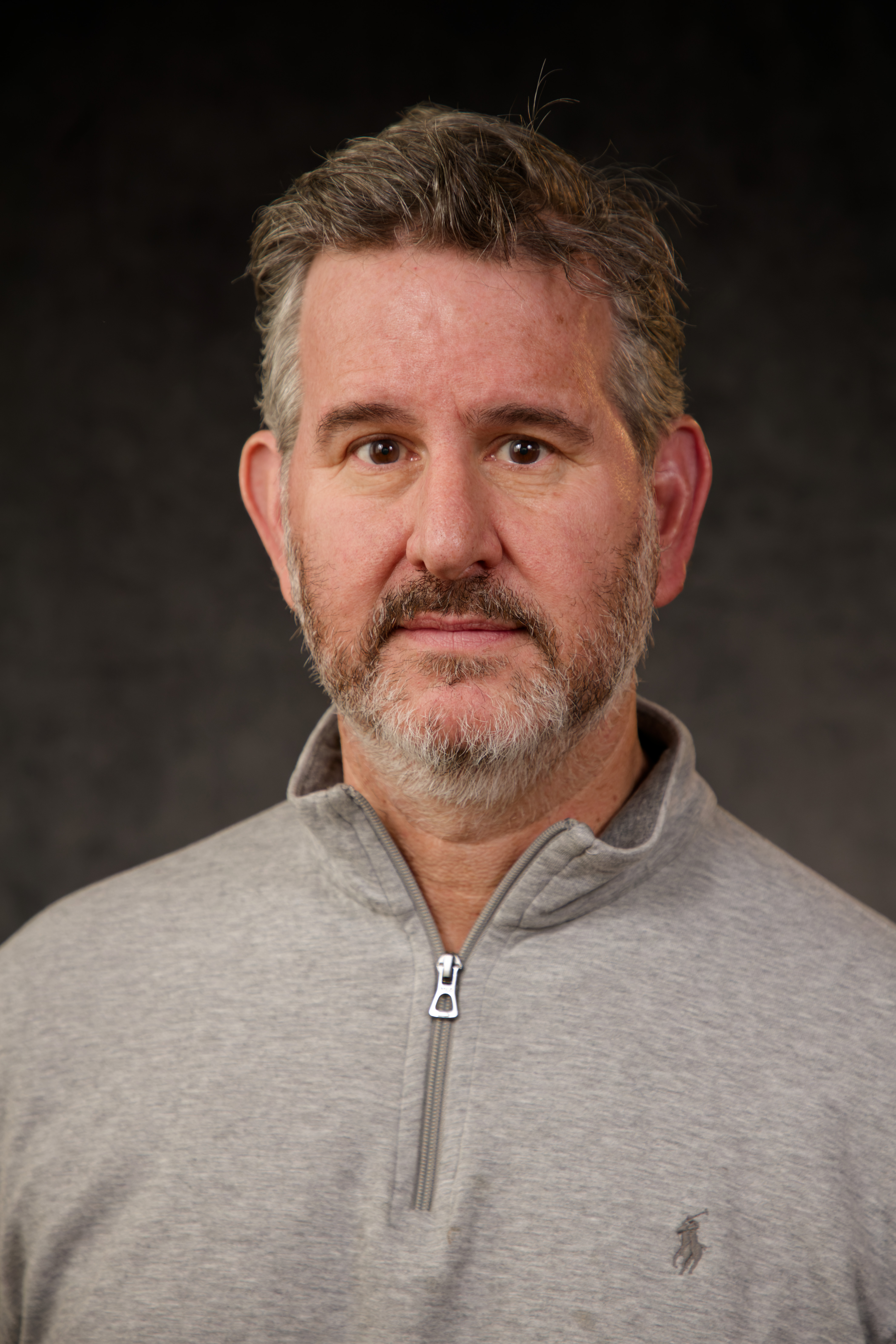

Background information
- Born: January 16, 1967 (age 59); Baltimore, Maryland, United States
- Genres: Rock, alternative rock, punk rock, indie rock
- Occupations: Recording engineer, musician, record producer
- Instruments: Piano, guitar, bass guitar, drums, vocals
- Years active: 1998–present
- Label: Mother West
- Website: cottagesounds.com

Charles Richard Newman (born January 16, 1967) is an American record producer, recording engineer, composer, songwriter, multi-instrumentalist, talent manager and music publisher. He is the co-founder of New York City's Mother West Records and Studios, The Deli Magazine, and the band PLEASE, who enjoyed minor success when their single "Here It Comes Again" was featured on the soundtrack to the film Empire Records. Most notably he has been working as the main engineer, mixer and co-producer for Stephin Merritt and The Magnetic Fields since his initial work on the critically acclaimed 69 Love Songs. He has also produced, mixed and engineered work by artists such as Flare, Gospel Music, Tom Shaner, Jon DeRosa, Dylan Trees, The Davenports, Lauren Molina, Soko, The Bones of J.R. Jones, Aloud, and, Peppina. Newman began co-managing the Seattle based rock band Motopony in 2015 accompanying the band on their tour of the United Kingdom, and assisting in production on their live EP “Naked at the Abbey” with producer Rob Cass.

== Record credits ==
Year	Title	Artist	Credits
1994	Noreally Thanks	Please	Engineer, Producer, Mixing
1995	The Electric Living Room	Please	Engineer, Producer, Mixing
1995	Empire Records Soundtrack	Please	W/A
1996	Here it Comes Again 7"	Please	Engineer, Producer, Mixing
1997	Sentimental Watermelon	Please	Engineer, Producer, Mixing
1997	Bottom	Flare	Engineer, Producer, Mixing
1998	The Ton-Ups	The Ton-Ups	Engineer, Producer, Mixing
1999	H2O	F.T.T.W.	Engineer, Producer, Mixing
1999	69 Love Songs	The Magnetic Fields	Engineer
1999	Speedial	Kecam	Engineer, Producer, Mixing
2000	Circa	Flare	Engineer, Producer, Mixing
2000	Speaking of the Davenports	The Davenports	Engineer, Producer, Mixing
2000	Til Summer Ends	Bela	Engineer, Producer, Mixing
2000	Waiting	Thursday	Engineer, Mixing
2001	Morning One EP	Aarktica	Engineer, Mixing
2001	Definitive	Flare	Engineer, Producer, Mixing
2002	…or you could just go through your whole life and be happy anyway	Aarktica	Engineer, Mixing
2002	The Future Bible Heroes	Eternal Youth	Engineer
2003	Pure Tone Audiometry	Aarktica	Engineer, Mixing
2003	Hung	Flare	Engineer, Producer, Mixing
2003	Stay Off your Heels	Earlymay	Engineer, Producer, Mixing
2004	i''	The Magnetic Fields	Engineer, Producer, Mixing
2004	Run to Be Born	The Walking Concert (featuring Walter Schriefels)	Engineer
2005	High Tech Lowlife	The Davenports	Engineer, Producer, Mixing
2005	Ceramic (EP)	Ceramic	Engineer, Producer, Mixing
2006	The Tragic Treasury: Songs from A Series of Unfortunate Events	The Gothic Archies	Engineer, Mixing
2006	East Side Story	Maximum Penalty	Engineer, Producer, Mixing
2006	Showtunes	Stephin Merritt	Engineer, Producer, Mixing
2006	Just What You Wanted	John LT	Engineer, Producer, Mixing
2007	Matchless Years	Aarktica	Engineer, Producer, Mixing
2007	Lullabye School	Kris Gruen	Engineer, Producer, Mixing
2007	Little Answers EP	Earlymay	Engineer, Producer, Mixing
2007	Raise High	Radio America	Engineer, Producer, Mixing
2007	Far From Home	The Bowmans	Engineer, Producer, Mixing
2008	Side By Side	AM	Engineer, Producer, Mixing
2008	Franklin Ave	Austin Hartley-Leonard	Engineer, Producer, Mixing
2008	Charlie Horse EP	Dylan Trees	Engineer, Producer, Mixing
2008	Distortion	The Magnetic Fields	Engineer, Producer, Mixing
2008	Exit Music	Bela	Engineer, Producer, Mixing
2009	In Sea	Aarktica	Mixing
2009	Cut	Flare	Engineer, Mixing
2009	What's Up Clown (Single) for Yo Gabba Gabba	Black Kids	Mixing
2009	Film Noir (EP)	Bela	Engineer, Producer, Mixing
2010	Future Sons & Daughters	AM	Engineer, Producer, Mixing
2010	Duettes EP	Gospel Music	Mixing
2010	Coraline (Original off Broadway Cast Recording)	Stephin Merritt	Engineer, Mixing
2010	Part of it All	Kris Gruen	Engineer, Producer, Mixing
2010	Sea for Two	Lauren Molina	Engineer, Producer, Mixing, Writer
2010	Gonna Be Alright (single)	Lauren Molina & Jeremy Jordan	Engineer, Producer, Mixing, Writer
2010	Realism	The Magnetic Fields	Engineer, Producer, Mixing
2010	The Past Ain't Far	Ceramic	Engineer, Producer, Mixing
2011	Big Top/Encore	Flare	Engineer, Producer, Mixing
2011	How to get to heaven from Jacksonville, FL	Gospel Music	Producer, Mixing
2011	Anchored EP	Jon DeRosa	Engineer, Producer, Mixing
2011	The Visitation	Mandala	Engineer, Producer, Mixing
2011	I Thought I Was An Alien	SoKo	Engineer, Producer
2011	Why the Great Gallup	The Davenports	Engineer, Producer, Mixing
2011	Get Real or Get Gone EP	Tom Shaner	Engineer, Producer, Mixing
2011	Art Deco Smiles	Bela	Engineer, Producer, Mixing
2012	Three Times of the Day	Dylan Trees	Engineer, Producer, Mixing
2012	A Wolf in Preachers Clothes	Jon DeRosa	Engineer, Producer, Mixing
2012	New Comics from the Wooded World	Kris Gruen	Engineer, Producer, Mixing
2012	Ghost Songs Waltzes and Rock & Roll	Tom Shaner	Engineer, Producer, Mixing
2012	Headlines and Firefights (EP)	Cold Blood Club	Engineer, Producer, Mixing
2012	LA	Earlymay	Engineer, Producer, Mixing
2012	Suburban Superstar	John LT	Engineer, Producer, Mixing
2012	We Are all Pieces of Heaven	Lilamayi	Engineer, Producer, Mixing
2013	Goodbye To All That (single)	Cold Blood Club	Engineer, Producer, Mixing
2013	Down (single)	Cold Blood Club	Engineer, Producer, Mixing
2013	Memories of Love, Eternal Youth and Partygoing	The Future Bible Heroes	Engineer, Mixing
2013	Signs of Life (single)	Jon DeRosa	Engineer, Producer, Mixing
2014	It's Got To Be Now	Aloud	Engineer, Producer, Mixing
2014	Michelada (single)	Cold Blood Club	Engineer, Producer, Mixing
2014	Dark Was the Yearling	The Bones of J.R. Jones	Engineer, Producer, Mixing
2015	Black Halo	Jon DeRosa	Engineer, Producer, Mixing
2016	Used Melodies	Soft News	Mixing
2016	Spirits; Furnace	The Bones of J.R. Jones	Engineer, Mixing,
2016	Futile Games in Space and Time	Evripidis and His Tragedies	Mixing
2016	Love Ain't For Me	Christine Castanon	Engineer, Producer, Mixing, Writer
2017	Fire	Peppina	Engineer, Producer, Mixing
2017	50 Song Memoir	The Magnetic Fields	Engineer, Producer, Mixing
2017	2008 (single)	Kris Gruen w/ Jim and Sam	Engineer, Producer, Mixing
2017	Fact 200	Soft News	Engineer, Mixing
2017	The Only Way Out is Down	Soft News	Engineer, Producer, Mixing, Arrangement
2017	Tear Down the Maps	Cold Blood Club	Engineer, Producer, Mixing
2017	Boson of Love	Jane Telephonda	Engineer, Mixing
2017	The Come On	The Come On	Mixing
2017	Alison James	Cold Blood Club	Engineer, Producer, Mixing
2022	No One Tastes Like You (single)	Litvar	Mixing
2023	Eloquently Aimless	Litvar	Producer, Mixing
