= Radio America (band) =

- Origin: New York, New York, United States; Worcester, Massachusetts, USA
- Genres: Rock, indie rock
- Years active: 2002-present
- Labels: Mother West
- Members: Jesse Reno; Thomas Stuart; Robby Van Sanders; Gabe Wilhelm
- Past members: Jason Aubin (drums); Tim O'Brien (drums)
- Website: Official Website

Radio America is a rock group based in New York City, currently signed to Mother West records by Charles Newman (member of Flare and producer/engineer of The Magnetic Fields, "Lemony Snicket," We Are Scientists, Kris Gruen, Lori Michaels, the Bowmans, Earlymay, etc.) In stark contrast to the radio network of the same name, Radio America are known not only for their award-winning live act but also for their openly leftist politics. After years as a three-piece (bass/drums/guitar with all members contributing vocals), the group currently performs as a four-piece act led by singer-songwriters Jesse Reno (vocals/bass) and Tom Stuart (vocals/guitar). The band's most recent full-length, the album Raise High, was released in September 2006.

The band is also well known for being fairly secretive and notoriously eccentric. Contrary to some published interviews and general rumor, Reno and Stuart are not brothers, but rather lifelong friends. However, the two have never publicly refuted the assumption for reasons unstated. Likewise, original drummer Jason Aubin is said to have left at some point during the completion of the Raise High recording sessions, though he is credited as a band member in the artwork for the CD. The band has never completely explained the timing or reason for his departure, though Reno did preposterously claim to Pulse Magazine (in Worcester, MA) that the drummer had left because he quote "found Jesus." In equally mysterious terms, there is no production credit on the album, simply crediting a one "Tintern" in Worcester, MA for having "recorded" the group.

Other extent semi-mysteries which surround the group include: the lyric jumble on the inside of the Raise High album sleeve; their supposedly existent English manager 'Magnus Thompson;' the group's supposed right-hand man and 'street-team' guru 'Ira Leonis;' the group's online politic/poetic/music journals and discussion page which the group refers to as the "Don't Tread On Manuals" some of the content of which the band may or may not have received in the form of handwritten notes from friends of the late political radical and fellow Worcester native son Abbie Hoffman; the group's repetitive use of the cryptic (and frankly, dubious) terms "VainGlory," "RadioAmerican," and "W.W.H.D." (the last of which is said by some to represent "What Would Hitler Do" - possibly a jab at Jason Aubin). The band claims that in fact, WWHD is an homage to one of their heroes, the great American writer, Ernest Hemingway.

Radio America is a member of ASCAP.

== Discography ==
Albums

- This Is Radio America (Peoples' Republic, 2003)
- Raise High (Mother West, 2006)
- You Will Pay for This (EP) (Mother West, 2008)
