= Dylan Trees =

British-American psychedelic pop band

- Origin: Los Angeles, California
- Genres: psychedelic rock dream pop indie rock
- Members: Jeremy Simon; Monica Olive; Krissy Barker; Brian Griffith; Casey Wojtalewicz
- Website: www.dylantrees.com

Dylan Trees was a British-American psychedelic pop band who play frequently around Los Angeles, California. They released their first recording, Charlie Horse EP, in 2008, followed up by Three Times of the Day EP in 2012. Both were recorded at Mother West in New York City and Atomix Studios in Los Angeles.

Dylan Trees disbanded in October, 2012.

== Members ==
- Jeremy Simon – vocals and guitar
- Monica Olive – vocals, synth and percussion
- Krissy Barker – piano, vocals, saw and flute
- Brian Griffith – bass
- Casey Wojtalewicz – drums and vocals

== Discography ==
=== Extended plays ===
- Charlie Horse EP (2008) produced by Charles Newman at Mother West
- Three Time of the Day EP (2012) produced by Charles Newman at Mother West

=== Compilations ===
- Beat LA (2011) song "Topanga" by Kathy Smith
