= Get Lost (The Magnetic Fields album) =

Studio album by The Magnetic Fields
- Released: October 24, 1995
- Genre: Indie pop; synth-pop; electropop
- Length: 39:58
- Label: Merge
- Producer: Stephin Merritt

The Magnetic Fields chronology
Holiday (1994)	Get Lost (1995)	69 Love Songs (1999)

Singles from Get Lost
- 1. "All the Umbrellas in London" Released: 1995; 2. "Why I Cry" Released: 1995

Professional ratings
Review scores
Source	Rating
AllMusic	3/5 stars
Christgau's Consumer Guide	A−
NME	9/10
The Rolling Stone Album Guide	3/5 stars
Select	4/5
Spin	7/10

Get Lost is the fifth studio album by American indie pop band the Magnetic Fields, released on October 24, 1995.

== Cover versions ==
The Divine Comedy have recorded covers of three songs from this album. "Love Is Lighter Than Air" appears as the B-side of their 1996 single "Something for the Weekend". "Famous" appears as the B-side of their 1999 single "National Express". Their version of "With Whom to Dance" appears as the B-side of their 1999 single "The Pop Singer's Fear of the Pollen Count".

Tracey Thorn has recorded covers of several Magnetic Fields songs. "Smoke and Mirrors" from Get Lost appears as the B-side of her 2007 single "Raise the Roof", together with her version of "The Book of Love" from 69 Love Songs.

Advance Base recorded a version of "You and Me and the Moon" for the 2018 album Animal Companionship.

== Track listing ==
CD

All tracks are written by Stephin Merritt, except where noted.

No.	Title	Writer(s)	Length
1.	"Famous"		3:11
2.	"The Desperate Things You Made Me Do"		3:54
3.	"Smoke and Mirrors"		3:08
4.	"With Whom to Dance?"		2:27
5.	"You and Me and the Moon"		2:59
6.	"Don't Look Away"		2:16
7.	"Save a Secret for the Moon"		3:02
8.	"Why I Cry"		3:37
9.	"Love Is Lighter Than Air"		2:59
10.	"When You're Old and Lonely"		1:57
11.	"The Village in the Morning"	Stephin Merritt; Robert Scott	3:40
12.	"All the Umbrellas in London"		3:18
13.	"The Dreaming Moon"		3:24

Vinyl

Side A
No.	Title	Length
1.	"With Whom to Dance?"	2:27
2.	"Smoke and Mirrors"	3:08
3.	"All the Umbrellas in London"	3:18
4.	"Why I Cry"	3:37
5.	"Save a Secret for the Moon"	3:02
6.	"Don't Look Away"	2:16
7.	"Love Is Lighter Than Air"	2:59

Side B
No.	Title	Writer(s)	Length
1.	"Famous"		3:11
2.	"The Desperate Things You Made Me Do"		3:54
3.	"You and Me and the Moon"		2:59
4.	"When You're Old and Lonely"		1:57
5.	"The Village in the Morning"	Stephin Merritt; Robert Scott	3:40
6.	"The Dreaming Moon"		3:24

== Personnel ==
The Magnetic Fields

- Stephin Merritt – vocals, instrumentation
- Claudia Gonson – drums, vocals, ukulele
- Sam Davol – cello, flute
- John Woo – guitar, banjo

Additional personnel

- Julie Cooper – bass guitar
- Natalie Lithwick – French vocals

Production

Get Lost was produced by Stephin Merritt. Kelly McKaig was the recording assistant, Eric Masunaga was the technical advisor and occasional mixer. The spoken word French vocals on the song "Smoke and Mirrors" were translated by Andrew Beaujon.

Eve Prime photographed the cover art for the album. The models in the photo are, from left to right, cellist Sam Davol, Ilsa Jule, Gail O'Hara, Michael Cavadias and Leslie Taylor (who would later go on to wed Sam Davol in 1997). Ashley Salisbury was the stylist.

Lilly of the Valley is listed in the liner notes as being one of the "cover models." It is in fact the performance character name of Michael Cavadias.

The tray card was photographed by John Woo.
