= Moth Wranglers =

US musical group

Moth Wranglers was a musical collaboration formed in 1998 by Chris Xefos (Drop Quarters, ex-King Missile), and LD Beghtol (Flare, The Magnetic Fields). The duo took their name from the credits for Jonathan Demme's 1991 thriller Silence of the Lambs. In their decade-long involvement, the pair created two albums and a number of other one-off recordings and live performances, mostly working separately in different studios. Guest musicians figure prominently on moth wranglers' recordings (Never Mind the Context (Magnetic, 2001), Never Better (Magnetic, 2004), and Never Again (digital release, 2010), including Victor Krummenacher and Jonathan Segel of Camper Van Beethoven), Ken Stringfellow of The Posies, Stephin Merritt of The Magnetic Fields, Doug Hilsinger and other noted rock/pop musicians of an experimental bent as well as multi-instrumentalist/mentalist/author Daniel Handler. The moth wranglers' song “Dear Santa (Don’t Come to My House)” — featuring Kendall Jane Meade — was used in the 2008 Irish feature film “How About You”, directed by Anthony Byrne and starring Vanessa Redgrave, Joss Akland and Hayley Atwell. moth wranglers disbanded in 2010.
