= A Wolf in Preacher's Clothes =

Studio album by Jon DeRosa
- Released: October 1, 2012
- Genre: Indie pop
- Length: 41:56
- Label: Mother West
- Producer: Charles Newman

Jon DeRosa chronology
Anchored EP (2011)	A Wolf in Preacher's Clothes (2012)	Black Halo (2015)

Professional ratings
Review scores
Source	Rating
The Skinny	4/5 stars
PopMatters	4/5 stars

A Wolf in Preacher's Clothes is an album by Jon DeRosa.

== Track listing ==
No.	Title	Length
1.	"Birds of Brooklyn"	3:11
2.	"True Men"	4:07
3.	"Snow Coffin"	4:07
4.	"Teenage Goths"	3:42
5.	"Easter Parade"	5:40
6.	"Tattooed Lady's Blues"	3:39
7.	"Who Decides?"	3:54
8.	"Don't Say Goodnight"	5:21
9.	"Ladies In Love"	3:31
10.	"Hollow Earth Theory"	4:44
Total length:		41:56
