= LD Beghtol =

American musician (1964–2020)

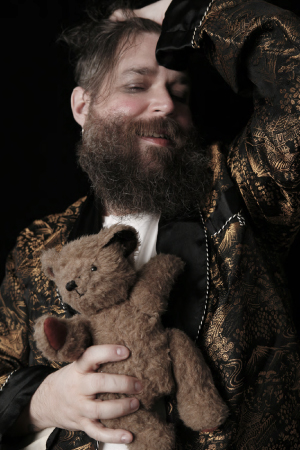
- Beghtol in 2009. Photo: Holly McDade.

Background information
- Occupations: Composer/producer, art director/graphic designer, writer
- Instruments: voice, ukulele, baritone ukulele, tenor guitar, Marxophone, Stylophone, keyboards, exotic percussion
- Years active: 1997–2020

LD Beghtol (13 December 1964 – 2020), also known as "Uncle LD", was an American musician, art director and writer. He was best known for participating in The Magnetic Fields' 69 Love Songs and writing the illustrated companion book 69 Love Songs, A Field Guide for the 33 1/3 book series.

Beghtol was born in Fort Campbell, Kentucky. He was a founding member of the band Flare—aka Flare Acoustic Arts League—and the death-pop outfit LD & the New Criticism, and was also in the collective, Moth Wranglers.

In 2012 Beghtol formed LD&CO, with Scott Sosebee (Little Red Rocket) and others to record and play live; their debut single "Morgantown" was mixed by Kramer, but remains unreleased. The band's experimental 5-songs-in-5 minutes EP, The Just-World Phenomenon was released by Silber in 2015. A full-length album, Mental Health Styling is scheduled for a future release, again in collaboration with Kramer. Additionally, he has partnered with Mark Bishop's San Francisco-based atmospheric synth project Bronze Eye for a series of audio miniatures entitled Adventures in Love & Culture—the first of which was released in May 2016 on Silber, as well as many collaborations and guest appearances as a vocalist, instrumentalist, and arranger/producer.

Beghtol served as designer/art director for The Village Voice, Travel Holiday, Outdoor Life, and other publications; since 2010 he worked in pharmaceutical advertising for industry leaders CDM, Area 23, and the BGB Group.

He was also known for his writing about popular culture for Time Out, Memphis Flyer, The Advocate, The Oxford American, and Gail O'Hara's fanzine chickfactor.
