= Rivulets =

American musician

- Born: Nathan Leavitt Amundson; Denver, Colorado, United States
- Genres: Singer-songwriter, slowcore, sadcore, indie folk, indie rock
- Occupation: Musician
- Years active: 2000–present
- Labels: Chairkickers Union, Important Records, Talitres
- Website: www.rivulets.net

Rivulets is the stage name of minimalist singer-songwriter Nathan Leavitt Amundson.

== Biography ==
Rivulets was the first artist signed to Low's Chairkickers Union record label in 2001. He then released his first, self-titled album in 2002 and DEBRIDEMENT in 2003. Rivulets was subsequently signed by Blast First, recording the album "you are my home" for Blast First Petite. "you are my home" was eventually licensed by Important Records and released in 2006, followed by We're Fucked in 2010, also on Important Records. This was followed by the critically acclaimed I Remember Everything on Jellyfant Records in 2014. Rivulets then signed with France-based label Talitres, releasing the sixth Rivulets album in Our Circle in 2018.

Musicians who have performed as part of Rivulets include: Alan Sparhawk (Low), Mimi Parker (Low), Bob Weston (Shellac)., LD Beghtol (The Magnetic Fields), Chris Brokaw (Codeine), Christian Frederickson (Rachel's), Jarboe (Swans), Haley Bonar, Jessica Bailiff, Jon DeRosa (Aarktica), Fred Lonberg-Holm, Nathan Vollmar (Jandek), and Francesco Candura (Jennifer Gentle).

Outside of his work as Rivulets, Amundson has also seen success as songwriter for hire, having penned songs for Berlin-based pop artist Clara Hill among others.

== Discography ==
- rivulets (Chairkickers' Union, 2002)
- DEBRIDEMENT (Chair Kickers' Union, 2003)
- you've got your own (Acuarela Discos, 2004)
- you are my home (Important Records, 2006)
- We're Fucked (Important Records, 2011)
- I Remember Everything (Jellyfant Records, 2014)
- In Our Circle (Talitres Records, 2018)
