= Mike Pride (musician) =

American drummer and percussionist

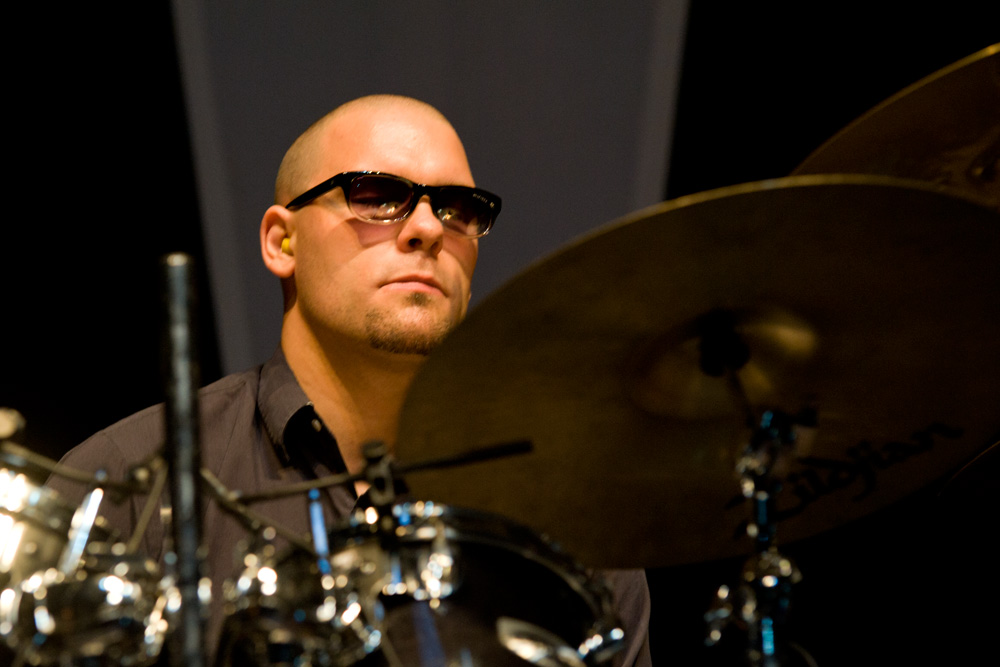
Mike Pride, Moers Festival 2012

Mike Pride is an American, New York City based drummer/percussionist, composer & improviser, sometimes vocalist, and educator, born on July 7. He is known for the large number of bands he plays with, and has a significant reputation in a multiplicity of musical communities around the world. Time Out NY says of one album featuring him "Pride has backed brainy jazz legend Anthony Braxton as well as political punks Millions of Dead Cops. Those influences and countless others speed by here, but the flow of ideas is so continuous that the album never feels like pastiche.". Born and raised in Southern Maine, but based out of New York City since 2000, Mike Pride currently performs solo, leads modern-jazz quartet From Bacteria To Boys, the 7-drummer installation-band Drummer's Corpse, and the piano trio I HATE WORK (which interprets the songs of Pride's former band, hardcore legends, MDC). He also co-leads the ensembles Pulverize The Sound (w/ Peter Evans and Tim Dahl), and Period (w/ Charlie Looker and Chuck Bettis). Pride is renowned for his ability to excel in a wide range of genres and ensembles. He has worked with everyone from improvised music icon Anthony Braxton to punk legends Millions Of Dead Cops, toured extensively on four continents, appeared on more than 100 recordings, and is currently touring the world opening for comedian Amy Schumer with Jason Stein's Locksmith Isidore.

A short list of his collaborators includes Mick Barr, Tim Berne, Boredoms, Eugene Chadbourne, Nels Cline, Andrew D'Angelo, Trevor Dunn, Dynamite Club, Peter Evans, Charles Gayle, Milford Graves, Drew Gress, Mary Halvorson, Curtis Hasselbring, Nona Hendryx, Jon Irabagon, Brad Jones, Haino Keiji, Kirk Knuffke, George Lewis, Frank Lowe, Bill McHenry, Tony Malaby, Sam Mickens, Butch Morris, Joe Morris, William Parker, Marc Ribot, Matana Roberts, Herb Robertson, Jamie Saft, Sonny Simmons, Craig Wedren, Nate Wooley, Otomo Yoshihide and John Zorn.

== Discography ==
=== As leader ===
- The MPThree: Sleep Cells (Rec. 2003; Utech, 2006), Trio with Mary Halvorson and Trevor Dunn
- Scrambler (Not Two, 2005), with William Parker, Charlie Looker, Tony Malaby
- Mike Pride's From Bacteria to Boys: Betweenwhile (AUM Fidelity, 2010), with Darius Jones, Peter Bitenc, Alexis Marcelo
- Drummer's Corpse (AUM Fidelity, 2013)

=== Collaborations ===
- Anthony Braxton / Sonny Simmons / Brandon Evans / André Vida / Mike Pride / Shanir Blumenkranz (Parallactic, 2003)
- Pale Horse and Rider: Moody Pike (Darla/Agenda, 2004)
- Marcos Fernandes / Mike Pride: A Mountain Is a Mammal (Accretions, 2006)
- Evil Eye: Doin' It All for My Baby (KMB Jazz, 2007)
- Jack Wright / Ben Wright / Mike Pride / Nate Wooley: Tenterhooks (Bug Incision, 2009)
- Kirk Knuffke & Mike Pride: The Exterminating Angel (Not Two, 2012)
- Jon Irabagon / Mike Pride / Mick Barr: I Don't Hear Nothin' But the Blues, Volume 2: Appalachian Haze (Irabbagast, 2012)

=== As sideman ===
With Marc Gartman

- All's Well That Ends (Pushpin, 2002)

With Brandon Evans

- Elliptical Axis 31 (Parallactic, 2003)

With Millions of Dead Cops (MDC)

- Magnus Dominus Corpus (Sudden Death/Yellow Dog/Peculio Discos, 2004)

With Burd Early

- Mind and Mother (Western Vinyl, 2004)

With Aarktica

- Bleeding Light (Darla, 2005)

With Boredoms

- 77 Boa Drum (Commmons, 2008)
- 77 Boa Drum (DVD, Thrill Jockey, 2010)

With Jason Stein's Locksmith Isidore

- A Calculus of Loss (Clean Feed, 2008)
- Three Less Than Between (Clean Feed, 2009)
- Three Kinds of Happiness (Not Two, 2010)

With Jamie Saft

- Black Shabbis (Tzadik, 2009)

With Yoni Kretzmer Trio

- Nevertheless (Hopscotch, 2010)

With Quivers

- Split (Part of album by Chart; Ultramarine, 2010)

With Pretty Monsters

- Pretty Monsters (Public Eyesore, 2012)

Hungry Cowboy

- Dance (Rec. 2010; Prom Night, 2013)
