= The Sooner It Comes =

EP by Aloud
- Released: June 12, 2004
- Recorded: Hanson, MA and Scituate, MA; January - March 2004
- Genre: Rock, Indie
- Length: 21:08
- Label: self-released
- Producer: Ian Hughes

Aloud chronology
| The Sooner It Comes (2004) | Leave Your Light On (2006) |

Singles from The Sooner It Comes
- 1. "(Hey Now) What's It To You" Released: February 16, 2004; 2. "Mind Relaxer" Released: February 16, 2004

Professional ratings
Review scores
| Source | Rating |
|---|---|
| 2 Walls Webzine | (Favorable) |
| The Noise | (Favorable) |
| Sohostrut | (Favorable) |

The Sooner It Comes is the name of Aloud's six song EP released on June 12, 2004.

"(Hey Now) What's It To You" b/w "Mind Relaxer" was a "double A-side" single released in February 2004 ahead of the EP's release. The two tracks were recorded at Emaginary Studios in Scituate, Massachusetts in late January. Recording continued at Courtlen Studios in February.

The vast majority of Sooner was recorded live in the studio with vocals overdubbed later, giving the disc a very "raw" sound. The Boston Globe spoke highly of the EP's "smart lyrics" and was praised for "cleverly tuneful vocals".

== Track listing ==
1. "A Cup of Tea"
2. "(Hey Now) What's It To You"
3. "Help Me Help You"
4. "Down"
5. "Mind Relaxer"
6. "Don't Trust the Radio"

=== Not included ===
- "Palm of Your Hand"
- "Late Last Nite"
- "From Somebody Like You"

"Palm of Your Hand" and "Late Last Nite" were recorded back to back during the Courtlen sessions, but did not make it onto the EP. This version of "Late Last Nite" was included as an extra on an Aloud CD-ROM Year In Review 2004. "From Somebody Like You" was recorded with Ian Hughes after the release of Sooner with the intent of including it as a B-side to the next single.

"Late Last Nite" and "Palm of Your Hand" were re-recorded in 2005 and included in the debut LP Leave Your Light On. "From Somebody Like You" remained unreleased until May 2, 2011, when it was included as a bonus track to commemorate Leave Your Light On's fifth anniversary.

== Personnel ==
- Jen de la Osa - lead vocals, guitar
- Henry Beguiristain - lead vocals, guitar
- Roy Fontaine - bass guitar
- Ross Lohr - drums

with

- Ian Hughes - producer
- Dana J. White - mastering
