= Future Sons & Daughters =

Studio album by AM
- Released: February 9, 2010
- Genre: Alternative rock Synthpop; Indie
- Length: 36:51
- Label: Filter US Recordings, AM Sounds
- Producer: Charles Newman, AM

AM chronology
| Side by Side: Duets, Vol. 1 (2008) | Future Sons & Daughters (2010) |

Professional ratings
Review scores
| Source | Rating |
|---|---|
| Allmusic | (favorable) |
| American Songwriter | 4/5 stars |
| Slant Magazine | 3/5 stars |

Future Sons & Daughters is the third full-length album by AM.

It was co-produced by Charles Newman and AM.

== Videos ==
AM's music videos from this album were "Grand Opinion" and "Self Preservation". They were directed by Blake West.

== Track listing ==
1. "A Complete Unknown" 2:24
2. "The Other Side" – 3:26
3. "It's Been So Long" – 2:56
4. "Darker Days" – 3:52
5. "Self Preservation" – 3:07
6. "Leavenworth" – 3:58
7. "Grand Opinion" – 4:35
8. "Fortunate Family Tree" – 3:32
9. "When The Dust Settles" – 3:52
10. "Jorge Ben" – 2:11
11. "Endings Are Beginnings" – 2:58
12. "It's Been So Long (Alternate Mix)" – 2:56 (Bonus Track) on iTunes.
13. "You Say These Things" – 4:13 (Bonus Track) on iTunes.
14. "Endings Are Beginnings (Piano Mix)" – 2:42 (Bonus Track) on iTunes.
15. "A Complete Unknown (Instrumental)" – 2:24 (Bonus Track) on iTunes.
16. "It's Been So Long (Instrumental)" – 2:54 (Bonus Track) on iTunes.
17. "Darker Days (Instrumental)" – 3:50 (Bonus Track) on iTunes.
18. "Grand Opinion (Instrumental)" – 4:34 (Bonus Track) on iTunes.
19. "Fortunate Family Tree (Instrumental)" – 3:29 (Bonus Track) on iTunes.
