= Tom Shaner =

Background information
- Origin: New York City, United States
- Genres: Indie rock, folk rock
- Years active: 1992–present
- Label: Gentleman Drifter Music Motherwest
- Website: www.tomshaner.com

Tom Shaner is an American songwriter, musician, producer performer, video director and writer based in New York City. Much of his music revolves around three styles, "his trilogy," as he describes, which are ghost songs, waltzes, and rock and roll. Woven together, these three elements define his sound.

His songs have been featured in Movies, TV shows, (such as ABC TV's "The Rookie" which movingly featured his ballad "Tide of Love.") He even composed the music for Tom's of Maine Toothpaste.

Tom has been described many different ways. Informed by American acoustic and electric Blues, Sun Records, the British Invasion, to Punk, New Wave, to Hip Hop, and Indie Rock, Shaner is known for his songwriting.

Before becoming a solo artist, Tom was lead singer and songwriter for NYC based band Industrial Tepee, and was a buddy and protégé of Jeff Buckley.

Shaner first garnered success as a solo artist with the release of his E.P. titled “Get Real or Get Gone.” (2011) The E.P. was reviewed favorably by a number of online magazines including NeuFutur and Music Emissions.

According to Mark Morton of Music Emissions, "Tom Shaner is a folk singer-songwriter, whose sound borders on the surreal, placing him somewhere between the realms of Nick Cave and Tom Waits. Yet, he performs with a true unpretentious earnestness akin to classic Simon & Garfunkel."

Similar accolades were given by James McQuiston of NeuFutur Magazine: "There are few singer-songwriters that are able to create something that successfully marries the rich tradition brought the genre by luminaries like Dylan and Cohen in the sixties with a vitality and vibrancy that is germane to current audiences. However, I believe that Tom Shaner does just that."

Shaner then released the full-length album "Ghost Songs, Waltzes, and Rock and Roll" (2012) on the Mother West Label to critical acclaim. Music journalists from RUST, Baby Sue Music Review, Galway Independent, New York Music Daily, Power of POP, all gave the album praising reviews. RustZine.com said "Tom Shaner is thoroughly American, completely New York, 100% right now, and this is an album that simply must be heard. It's a celestial alignment of ideas, people and energies. It's an all-time great album, from a rarified artist. Essential."

The Galway Independent's said "It is this eclectic taste, which lends his dusty Americana a fresh and modern sound. There are undoubtedly strong hints of Dylan and Waits in his voice and songs, but, while his sound has its roots in the past, it is not stuck there. ‘Forever Drug’, from his latest album ‘Ghost Songs, Waltzes and Rock & Roll’, for example, sounds like Beck jamming with Alabama. Tom’s songs often have an undercurrent of humour running through them; even the more somber numbers have an eccentricity to them that few artists can muster...Shaner’s music has an infectious swagger and underlying positivity that seems effortless."

Just recently (November) Shaner released his second full length album entitled ″I Hate To See Your Spirit Fade.″ (2015). Its 17 tracks add to the cache of songs presented on his previous album from 2012. The new record was self-produced and mastered by Brian Lucey, whose resumé includes work with The Black Keys, The Shins, The Arctic Monkeys, Beck, The Arcs.

== History ==
=== Early life ===
Shaner was raised in Connecticut where he was involved in sports and theater. After spending one year at Bard college, he attended New York University where he studied theater under William H. Macey and David Mamet. At NYU he wrote and staged two plays, and also began playing his original songs on the streets and in the subways. Early friendships with late friend Jeff Buckley, Tom Clark, Daniel Harnett, and long time close friend and collaborator Danielle Howle have been influential. Together with Howle, the two sang a duet for the main track of a film called "Glissando."

Shaner performed as the lead singer of Industrial Tepee. The band released three albums including, "What Divine Engine", "Hymns For the Civil Savage", and a self titled album. The band toured extensively throughout the United States of America.

Among the musicians and friends Shaner has worked with are Whit Smith of Hot Club of Cowtown, Claude Coleman, Jr., of Ween,” Pete Fand, Paul Wegmann, Josh Margolis, Phil Cohen, Bob Sharkey, Rob Cimno, Dan Green, Chris Harfenist of “Sound of Urchin,” Merrill Garbus of Tune-Yards, Emmy Bean, and many others. Industrial Tepee's tracks "Joe's Airfield" and "We're Gonna Ride It" were on the soundtrack of the film Bloody Murder.

=== Later life ===
Tom Shaner playing guitar, live in New York City, 2011

From 2007 to present he has been performing extensively in Ireland, where his varied and dynamic songs are finding a wider audience. Gigs in Ireland include playing with friends and Irish songwriters Hank Wedel and Gavin Moore.

Shaner currently records with Mother West Records. He works alongside producer Charles Newman, who has produced records for Stephin Merritt and the Magnetic Fields.

He composed songs for two plays, one Bertolt Brecht's "The Good Person of Szechwan" the other, Max Frisch’s "The Firebugs" for director Eric Bass, of the Sandglass Theater. Tom Shaner also is known to occasionally perform and write for a multi-media performance group called "Company of Strangers" in Vermont. They combine songs, video, and puppetry for haunted yet humorous performances on an old farm. Company of Strangers was founded by friends and collaborators Finn Campman and Barbara Whitney. While working with “Company of Strangers” he met Emmy Bean. The two often sing together, and Emmy is featured in the “Get Real or Get Gone" video.

"Get Real or Get Gone" and "She's in the Air" from Tom Shaner's solo E.P. “Get Real or Get Gone,” released in 2011, have been highlighted on television by Oprah Winfrey's network's show "Ryan & Tatum: the O'Neils."

Tom Shaner's solo tracks have also been played on other television shows. MTV's The Osbournes used his song "He's a Player, as have numerous other TV shows and media.

Still from the music video "Get Real or Get Gone" featuring Tom Shaner and Emmy Bean.
