= AM (musician) =

American singer-songwriter

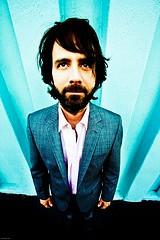

Background information
- Born: Tulsa, Oklahoma, United States
- Genres: Folk rock, alternative rock
- Occupation: Singer-songwriter
- Instruments: Guitar, ukulele, vocals
- Labels: Park the Van, Filter US Recordings, AM Sounds
- Website: www.amsounds.com

AM is an American songwriter, musician, composer and producer born in Tulsa, Oklahoma, raised in New Orleans, and currently residing in the Los Angeles Echo Park neighborhood in California. AM or A.M. refers to his band and is also the moniker for this artist. Known for his seamless fusing of pop, soul, funk and world music, recording artist AM has released several critically acclaimed albums and toured the world. His newest collaboration with London artist/producer Shawn Lee, has been described by Rolling Stone as "hypnotic" and by Daytrotter as "intricate, groove-filled dreamscapes that are every bit organic and every bit mad genius."

== Career ==
AM has toured with bands such as the French band AIR, Charlotte Gainsbourg, Thievery Corporation, Caetano Veloso, Shawn Lee, and Josh Rouse.

AM DJ's under the moniker George Ben Sun.

AM's side project creatively entitled AM & Shawn Lee is a collaboration with London-based producer and multi-instrumentalist Shawn Lee. After AM heard Lee's Music and Rhythm album on the radio in Los Angeles he decided to reach out to Lee on Myspace. The two became quick friends sharing a common love for 60's psychedelia and 70's Italian soundtracks. The first single from the debut album Celestial Electric is entitled Dark into Light and was released on gold colored, limited edition 12" vinyl on the Ubiquity label in honor of Record Store Day and the full album came out on Thievery Corporation's label ESL Music (ADA Distribution/ Beggars Canada/ Naive in France.)

La Musique Numerique (Park The Van Records) is the second LP from AM & Shawn Lee (Park The Van Records).

After selling 25,000 albums on his own, AM's critically acclaimed debut album Troubled Times (released on Defend Music in the US and Luna Records in Europe) went on to have all 10 songs featured in films and television shows which had not been done since Moby's album Play. When Gary Jules brought his PA into a little coffee shop and began booking songwriter nights, he invited AM to come up and play and this was the beginning of what is now known as one of the most established singer-songwriter venues in the country, the Hotel Cafe in Los Angeles, California. AM credits KCRW's Nic Harcourt who started playing AM's demos for being the first to play his music on the radio show Morning Becomes Eclectic.

Future Sons & Daughters was released on Filter US Recordings in the US and in the UK on the high fidelity label Naim. Side By Side- Duets Vol. 1 was a duets project he conceived of as a way to work with songwriter friends including: Tina Dico, Meiko, Rick Garcia, Buddy, Susie Suh, and Julianna Raye. "Side By Side- Duets Vol.2" is in the works.

== iTunes Store ==
AM has been featured many times in the "Indie Spotlight" under Alternative and Singer/Songwriter in the iTunes Store.

AM won the "Best singer/Songwriter of the Year"award at the LA Weekly Music Awards where Brian Wilson also accepted the award for Lifetime Achievement. iTunes named AM's debut album "Troubled Times" "Best Singer/Songwriters Album of the Year" on iTunes.

== Education ==
AM is an alumnus of Loyola University in New Orleans, Louisiana and has a bachelor's degree in philosophy.

== Nowadays ==
In addition to the above, his music has also been featured in pivotal scenes on shows such as MTV's The Hills, and HBO's Big Love, ABC's Men in Trees, and he has been given reference in the music publications Billboard (magazine) and Performing Songwriter Magazine.

AM performed on the main stage at the 2009 and 2011 Voodoo Music Festival in New Orleans with Duran Duran, Flaming Lips, and Muse. AM performed on the main stage at Dfest in Tulsa, Oklahoma with The Roots, All American Rejects, and Paramore. He has been compared to Wilco, Beck, Jackson Browne, John Lennon, Coldplay, Nada Surf, Pete Yorn, Phoenix, The Fruit Bats, and the late Elliott Smith.

AM has cited The Flaming Lips, Wilco, Antonio Carlos Jobim, Jorge Ben, The Byrds, Johnny Cash, McCoy Tyner, and Lou Reed among his influences.

== Discography ==
=== Albums ===
==== Solo ====
- 2016: Precious Life
- 2009: Future Sons & Daughters (Filter US Recordings/ AM Sounds)
- 2008: Soul Variations (AM Sounds)
- 2005: Troubled Times (Defend Music/ AM Sounds)
- Side By Side – Duets Vol. 1 (AM Sounds), featured in "What's Hot" iTunes. Duets album featuring AM performing duets with friends and notable singer-songwriters Buddy, Meiko, Julianna Raye, Tina Dico, Susie Suh, and Rick Garcia.
- Friday Night Lights Vol. 2 (television soundtrack) (Scion) featuring AM's song "What You Hide"

==== AM and Shawn Lee ====
- 2015: Outlines
- 2013: La Musique Numerique
- 2011: Celestial Electric (Eighteenth Street Lounge/ ESL Music/ Naive/ AM Sounds)

=== Covers ===
- "I'll Be Your Mirror" – Velvet Underground written by Lou Reed, duet performed with AM and Julianna Raye
- "While My Guitar Gently Weeps" – written by George Harrison duet performed with AM and Tina Dico, or Tina Dickow as she is known in her native country of Denmark.
- "Jackie Blue" – written by Larry Lee and Steve Cash from The Ozark Mountain Daredevils, performed by AM & Shawn Lee
- "Me And My Arrow" – written by Harry Nilsson, performed by AM
- "Steppin' Out" – written by Joe Jackson, performed by AM & Shawn Lee

== Music videos ==
- "Dark Into Light" directed by A Bigger Plan
- "Grand Opinion" directed by Blake West
- "Self Preservation" directed by Blake West
- "Hear Me Sing" directed by Gus Black
- "It's Been So Long" directed by Gus Black

== Radio ==
- Regular rotation airplay on KCRW's "Morning Becomes Eclectic", "New Ground" and the Nationally syndicated "Sounds Eclectic"
- Performed live on KCRW's Morning Becomes Eclectic with Jason Bentley
- Performed live on KEXP
- Performed live on WFUV
- Performed live on OPM
- Performed live on KCRW's Morning Becomes Eclectic with Nic Harcourt

== Awards ==
- Best Singer Songwriter of the Year- LA Weekly
- "Best Song of the Year 2012– Somebody Like You"- No. 6 Daytrotter
- "Best Albums of 2010" – Rough Trade
- "Best Album of 2009" – iTunes

== Composer ==
- Man Maid- AM co-composed this film with Tom Hiel.

== Television song appearances ==
- Grey's Anatomy Episode "Free Falling"
  - "Boundaries"
- Criminal Minds Episode "Painless"
  - "City Boy"
- Royal Pains – episode 205 ("Mano a Mano")
  - "Self Preservation"
- Friday Night Lights – episode 402 ("After The Fall")
  - "What You Hide"
- Real World: New Orleans – episode 2402
  - "Self Preservation"
- Men in Trees – Season 1 episode ("Take It Like A Man")
  - "Playing The Game"
- Dog The Bounty Hunter episode 232–233 "Tears For Fears"
  - "Running Away"
- Dog The Bounty Hunter episode 228
  - "Losing You"
- Trust Me – episode
  - "Playing The Game"
- Greek – episode 2024
  - "Troubled Times"
- The Real World: Washington D.C. – episode 2303 ("Playboys and Proper Proportion")
  - "Live A Lie (Instrumental)"
- Knight Rider – episode 16 ("Knight and the City")
  - "Stepping Stone"
- Brothers and Sisters – 2-Hour Special episode ("Troubled Waters")
  - "Live A Lie"
- iCarly – episode 213 ("iKiss")
  - "Running Away"
- Zoey 101 – episode ("Back To PCA")
  - "City Syndrome"
- Zoey 101 – episode ("Back To PCA")
  - "Mainstay"
- Zoey 101 – episode ("Robot Wars")
  - "Running Away"
- Keeping Up with the Kardashians – episode ("Blame It on the Alcohol")
  - "Darker Days"
- Keeping Up with the Kardashians- episode ("Blind Date")
  - "Self Preservation"
- Keeping Up with the Kardashians – episode ("Dash No More")
  - "A Complete Unknown"
- Keeping Up with the Kardashians – episode ("Kim's House Party")
  - "You Say These Things"
- Keeping Up with the Kardashians – episode ("Kris The Cougar Jenner")
  - "Fortunate Family Tree"
- Keeping Up with the Kardashians – episode ("Scott on the Rocks")
  - "Playing The Game"
- Keeping Up with the Kardashians – episode ("Weekend From Hell")
  - "Playing The Game"
- Trust Me – episode ("What's The Rush")
  - "Wayside"
- Zoey 101 – episode ("Time Capsule")
  - "Wayside"
- Big Love – episode 108
  - "Gone Away"
- Greek – episode 116
  - "Troubled Times"
- The Hills – episode 317
  - "City Syndrome"
- Kyle XY – episode 210 ("House of Cards")
  - "We Will Remain"
- Kyle XY – episode 210 ("House of Cards")
  - ""What You Hide"
- Kyle XY – Season 2 ("Hands on a Hybrid")
  - ""We Will Remain"
- Life As We Know It – episode 102
  - "Troubled Times"
- What About Brian – episode 101 "Two In Twenty-Four"
  - "Playing The Game"
- What About Brian – episode 101
  - "Mainstay"
- Married to Rock – episode 108
  - "Jorge Ben"
- Zoey 101 – episode 202
  - "Playing The Game"
- Cheyenne
  - "City Syndrome"
- Reunited: The Real World Vegas – episode 01
  - "Wayside"
- The Bad Girls Club – episode 213 "Cordelia and the Chamber of Secrets"
  - "Wayside"
- The Bad Girls Club – episode "This Is Not The Amber Show"
  - "Everybody's Jesus"
- The Bad Girls Club – episode "Out with a Bang"
  - "Mainstay"
- The Bad Girls Club – episode "Shrink Wrapped"
  - "Troubled Times"

== Film song appearances ==
- Spread – Starring Ashton Kutcher and Anne Heche and directed by David Mackenzie. The film was released under the name L.A. Gigolo in Denmark, Finland, Norway, and Sweden, as Toy Boy in France, Germany and the Netherlands, American Playboy in Spain and S-Lover in South Korea. The film was released on January 17 at the Sundance Film Festival and was released on August 14, 2009, in theaters.
  - "Mainstay"
- Wake – Directed by Ellie Kanner, starring Danny Masterson, Bijou Phillips, and Jane Seymore
  - "Hear Me Sing"
- The Naked Ape
- Dreamland – Starring Gina Gershon, Justin Long
  - "Mainstay"
- Dreamland
  - "Troubled Times"
- Butterfly Effect 2- American psychological thriller film directed by John R. Leonetti, starring Eric Lively, Erica Durance, Dustin Milligan and Gina Holden
- Flakes – American comedy film, directed by Michael Lehmann and starring Aaron Stanford and Zooey Deschanel.
  - "Gone Away"
- 99 Pieces
- Man Maid
