= Fan the Fury =

2008 album by Aloud

Fan The Fury

Studio album by Aloud
- Released: March 25, 2008
- Recorded: New York, NY; September - October 2007
- Genre: Rock
- Length: 40:56
- Label: Lemon Merchant
- Producer: Chuck Brody

Aloud chronology
Leave Your Light On (2006)	Fan The Fury (2008)	Live 2009 (2009)

Fan The Fury is the name of Aloud's follow up to their 2006 debut full-length Leave Your Light On. It is the only Aloud album containing music credited as written by all four original members of the band, as well as the last to feature bassist Roy Fontaine and drummer Ross Lohr. The album was produced by Sony mix engineer Chuck Brody.

Fan The Fury was released on March 25, 2008 on Lemon Merchant Records.

== Album cover ==
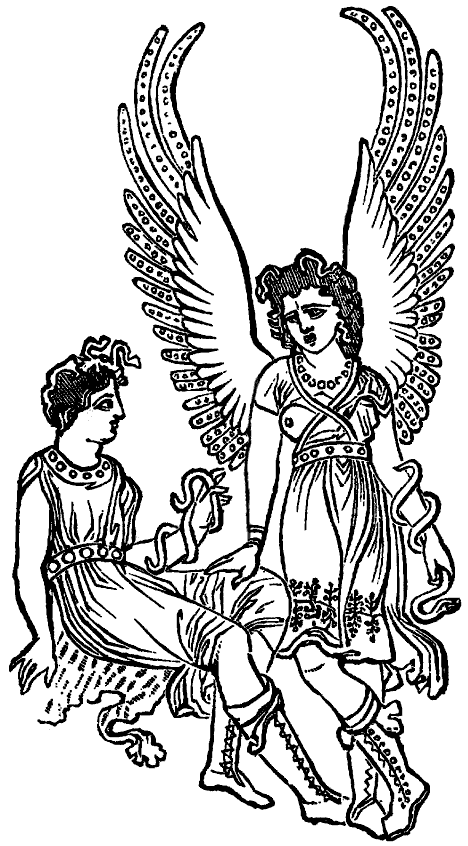
Deux Furies, from an ancient vase.

The cover of Fan The Fury is a plain off-white canvas with a painting of a portion of Deux Furies, with one half of the image on either side of the sleeve. The image, now in the public domain, is a 19th-century reproduction of a design on an ancient vase of the Erinyes of Greek mythology. Photographs of Aloud for the inside were taken by Mick Murray. Like previous Aloud albums the sleeve was put together by Henry Beguiristain, credited as "Big Hen".

A digital booklet was created and made available for free download in Adobe Acrobat format containing additional photographs by Mick Murray and the full lyrics to the album.

The album artwork also featured a new "Aloud" logo, replacing the original which had been in use by the band since its inception.

== Reception ==
Professional ratings
Review scores
Source	Rating
Revolt Media	4/5 stars
Eagle Times	(Favorable)
The Noise	(Favorable)

Upon its release, Fan The Fury received a warm welcome from press, extolling it as a more mature effort than Leave Your Light On. Praise was also given to the guitar work, the "propelling" beats, and the vocal interplay between singers Jen and Henry. Phil Ramone and Danielle Evin described the melodies as "ear-catching", in particular singling out the title track. Despite the praise, Fan The Fury did receive the band's most scathing review to date, with a UK blog calling it "a globulous mass of musical phlegm.". Opinions on the political overtones of Fan The Fury also varied, running the gamut from those who believed it enhanced the record to those who believed it was the album's weakness. This was not lost on the band, who in an interview said the intent was to release a record on an election year that would either be loved or hated.

To date, Fan The Fury has remained on The Noise Top 30 Radio Chart, peaking at #2, but generally remaining in the Top 10. The album did better on college radio than Leave Your Light On, with 100 college radio stations around the United States adding it to their rotation.

== Track listing ==
All lyrics are written by Jen de la Osa and Henry Beguiristain; all music is composed by Beguiristain/de la Osa/Fontaine/Lohr.

No.	Title	Length
1.	"Witness"	0:59
2.	"Sometimes I Feel Like A Vampire"	2:48
3.	"The Last Time"	3:28
4.	"Julie"	2:37
5.	"Fan The Fury"	3:35
6.	"Murder Will Out"	2:33
7.	"You Got Me Wrong"	2:49
8.	"Nero"	3:42
9.	"Hard Up In The 2000s"	4:47
10.	"The Battle Of Love"	3:32
11.	"When The Ants Attack The Queen"	2:55
12.	"Backs To The Wall"	4:14
13.	"Justice & Forgiveness"	3:01
Total length:		40:56

== Personnel ==
Aloud

- Henry Beguiristain - lead vocals, guitar, piano, synths
- Jen de la Osa - lead vocals, guitar, piano, Rhodes
- Roy Fontaine - bass, backing vocals
- Ross Lohr - drums, percussion

Additional personnel

- Wendy Mittelstadt - strings
- Chuck Brody - producer, mixing
- Jeff Lipton - mastering
- Maria Rice - assistant engineer (mastering)
- Hugh Wyman - "Sinister Swami"

== Live 2009 ==
Live 2009

Live album by Aloud
- Released: December 31, 2009
- Recorded: Pittsburgh, PA; November 18, 2009
- Genre: Rock
- Length: 15:28
- Label: Lemon Merchant

Aloud chronology
Fan The Fury (2008)	Live 2009 (2009)	Exile (2010)

Live 2009 is the name of a live EP released by Aloud on December 31, 2009 featuring songs from Fan The Fury. Live 2009 was released after the conclusion of the Fan The Fury tour as a free digital download. The EP was recorded on November 18, 2009 in Pittsburgh, PA at Howler's Coyote Cafe. It was recorded and mixed by Bengt Alexsander.

=== Reception ===
Professional ratings
Review scores
Source	Rating
Playground Boston	(Favorable) link

Playground Boston called Live 2009 "excellent", and praised the live aspect of the EP by saying "the energy in each song is fierce and palpable".

=== Track listing ===
All lyrics are written by Jen de la Osa and Henry Beguiristain; all music is composed by Beguiristain/de la Osa/Fontaine/Lohr.

No.	Title	Length
1.	"The Last Time"	3:25
2.	"Sometimes I Feel Like A Vampire"	2:41
3.	"Fan The Fury"	3:30
4.	"You Got Me Wrong"	2:46
5.	"When The Ants Attack The Queen"	3:11
Total length:		15:31

=== Personnel ===
Aloud

- Henry Beguiristain - lead vocals, guitar
- Jen de la Osa - lead vocals, guitar

Additional personnel

- Bengt Alexsander - recording and mixing
- Tommy Mazalewski - drums
- Charles Murphy - bass, backing vocals
