= Leave Your Light On =

Studio album by Aloud
- Released: May 2, 2006
- Recorded: Dayville, CT and Brighton, MA; May — October 2005
- Genre: Rock
- Length: 46:00
- Label: Lemon Merchant
- Producer: Hugh Wyman

Aloud chronology
The Sooner It Comes (EP) (2004)	Leave Your Light On (2006)	Fan The Fury (2008)

Singles from Leave Your Light On
- 1. "All I Can Do" Released: December 4, 2005; 2. "Beaches" Released: April 5, 2006; 3. "Can You Hear Me Now?" Released: March 5, 2007

Professional ratings
Review scores
Source	Rating
The Boston Phoenix	3/4 stars
Performer Magazine	(Favorable)
The Noise	(Favorable)

Leave Your Light On is the name of Aloud's debut full-length album, which was released on May 2, 2006 on Lemon Merchant Records. The majority was recorded from May through August 2005 in Dayville, Connecticut, with the rest being completed in Brighton, Massachusetts. It was produced by Hugh Wyman (ex-guitarist of Baby Strange and The Luxury).

The album was released to college radio stations (and some commercial stations) the second week of May. National radioplay for the album peaked on the RIYL Music chart in July at #191 (out of 875).

Leave Your Light On also received many favorable reviews upon its release, most notably in the Northeast United States and online music blogs.

In April, a music video was released for the song "Beaches", the album's leadoff single. Another video for "Can You Hear Me Now?" was released in early March 2007.

== Track listing ==
No.	Title	Length
1.	"Release"	3:24
2.	"Palm of Your Hand"	4:25
3.	"Beaches"	3:20
4.	"Can You Hear Me Now?"	2:24
5.	"All I Can Do"	5:08
6.	"Slipped In Your Dream"	5:20
7.	"Bleeding Heart"	3:43
8.	"Love is a Beast"	3:51
9.	"Wouldn't It Be Sweet"	5:51
10.	"Late Last Nite"	4:21
11.	"Godspeed"	4:07

5th anniversary bonus tracks
No.	Title	Length
12.	"From Somebody Like You"	2:42
13.	"Love is a Beast (demo)"	3:26
14.	"Bleeding Heart (live)"	3:42

== Personnel ==
Aloud

- Jen de la Osa: lead vocals, guitar, organ
- Henry Beguiristain: lead vocals, guitar, piano
- Roy Fontaine: bass, backing vocals
- Ross Lohr: drums, percussion

Additional personnel

- Hugh Wyman: producer
- Tom Polce: mixing, mastering
- Wendy Mittelstadt: viola on "Slipped In Your Dream"
- Chris Phillips - engineering (Dayville, CT)
- Scott Brown: engineering (Dayville, CT)

Additional engineering by Hugh Wyman and Aloud.
