= Aloud =

American indie rock band

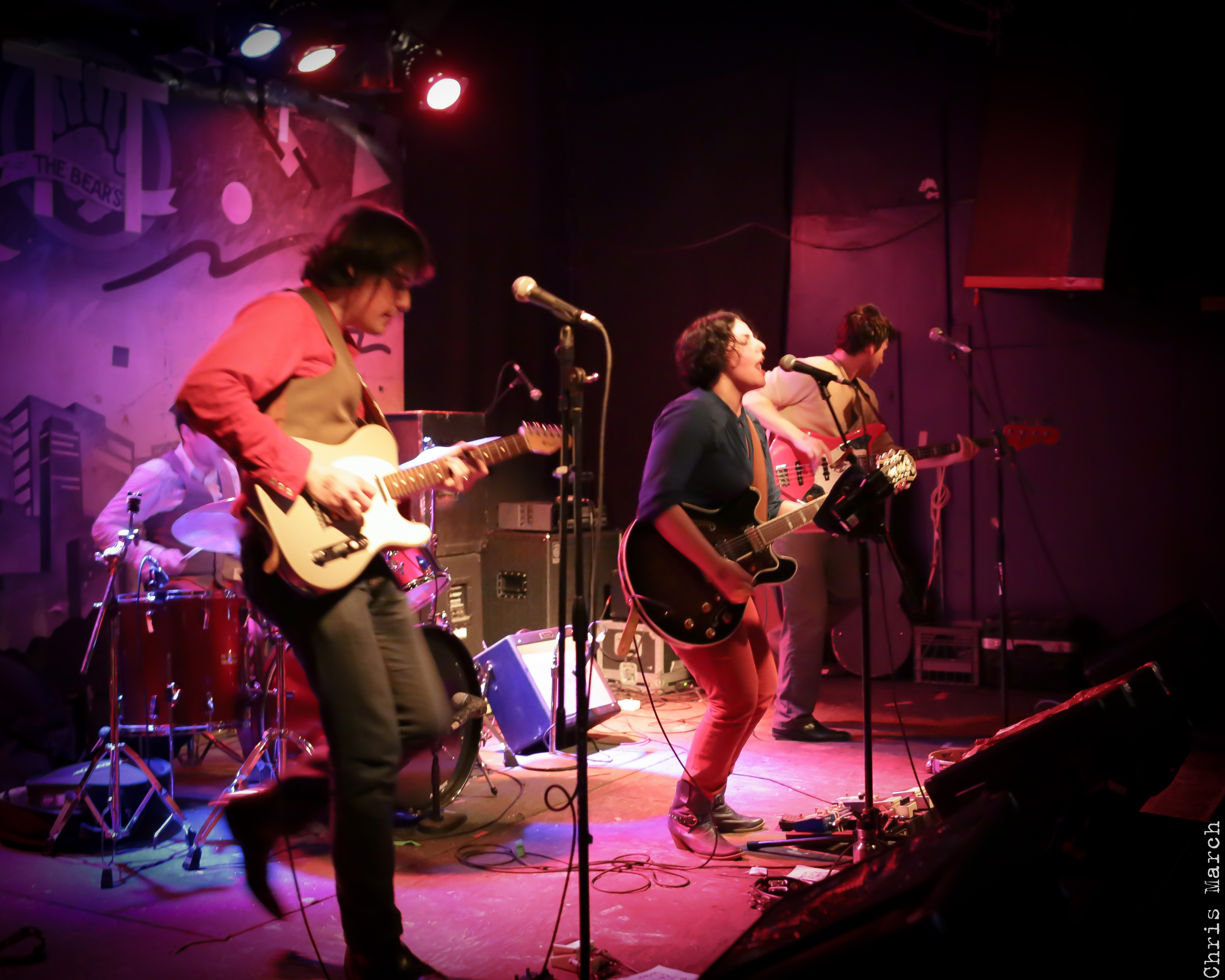
- Left to right: Frank Hegyi, Henry Beguiristain, Jen de la Osa, Charles Murphy

Background information
- Origin: Boston, Massachusetts, U.S.
- Genres: Rock, Indie rock
- Years active: 2002–present
- Labels: Lemon Merchant; Mother West
- Members: Henry Beguiristain; Jen de la Osa; Charles Murphy; Alanah Ntzouras Maguire
- Past members: Vanessa Acosta; Chuck Ferreira; Roy Fontaine; Frank Hegyi; Chris Jago; Ross Lohr
- Website: Official Website

Aloud is an American indie rock band known for its songwriting and vocal prowess, as well as using a two lead singer approach.

Founded in 2002 by Jen de la Osa (lead vocals, guitar, keys) and Henry Beguiristain (lead vocals, guitar, keys) in Boston, Massachusetts, the group is rounded out by bassist/backing vocalist Charles Murphy and drummer Chris Jago. In 2017, the band expanded its lineup to include Alanah Ntzouras Maguire on saxophone and Vanessa Acosta on trumpet. Aloud has released music under the Lemon Merchant Records label since 2006, with the exception of their fourth studio album It's Got To Be Now.

Their last EP, Observer Affect, was released in December 2024.

== History ==
=== 2002-2006: Formation and early years ===
Aloud was formed in May 2002 in Boston, Massachusetts, by lead vocalists/guitarists and primary songwriters, Jen de la Osa and Henry Beguiristain, who met as teenagers in the Miami-based band Rain. Aloud evolved out of an earlier version of the group named Feedback, which included bassist Roy Fontaine. Rob Acevedo, who drummed for Rain, was recruited to play drums for the fledgling band on an indefinite, but temporary basis. The four spent the summer working on a home-recorded four song demo titled Don't Trust the Radio, which was released on July 31, 2002, and was briefly sold at shows in the Boston area. In early 2003, Aloud recorded another four song demo titled Pretty Little Picture. Rob Acevedo would be replaced by Eric Anderson on drums before Ross Lohr was taken on near the end of 2003 as a permanent member.

==== The Sooner It Comes and Leave Your Light On ====
With the addition of Lohr, Aloud recorded The Sooner It Comes, a six-song EP, with producer Ian Hughes in early 2004. Aloud expanded their touring area to a greater portion of New England and New York City. That same year, Aloud met Hugh Wyman of the Boston band Baby Strange. Wyman became a frequent collaborator and adviser. He would eventually produce Aloud's debut album Leave Your Light On in 2005.

The band made its first real mark after releasing their debut album Leave Your Light On on May 2, 2006, to positive press and national airplay on college radio. Aloud toured the record around the Northeast United States till the end of 2006 while concurrently working on material for their next record.

=== 2007-2009: Fan The Fury and a new lineup ===
In April 2007, Aloud made it to the semi-final round of the 29th annual WBCN Rock & Roll Rumble, beating out 15 other groups for the wildcard slot. Jen de la Osa was nominated for Best Female Vocalist by the Boston Phoenix that month.

De la Osa and Beguiristain spent the rest of 2007 writing material for a second album, eventually choosing to record it that Fall at Fireplace Studios in New York City with Sony mix engineer Caleb Shreve (under the pseudonym Chuck Brody). Between recording sessions, Aloud made their first appearance at the CMJ Music Marathon that October.

Fan The Fury, was released on March 25, 2008. Fan The Fury contained more overt political themes than any of Aloud's previous work, and was praised as a more mature offering than Leave Your Light On. A national tour to support the album followed. Hard Up In The 2000s, a film documenting the Spring leg of the tour, was released on September 12, 2008.

In October 2008, it was revealed Aloud was developing a multimedia live performance of Fan The Fury titled I Just Want To Witness..., named after a lyric in the songs "Witness" and "Justice & Forgiveness". The show integrated Aloud's live performance of Fan The Fury in its entirety with corresponding films, and was developed with filmmaker Johnathan Carr. Films were contributed by Johnathan Carr himself as well as directors Erin Bowser, Mike Pecci, Chris March, and animators Kristin Osiecki and Timothy Scholl. I Just Want To Witness... debuted in Boston on November 18, 2008. While this has been the only full performance of I Just Want To Witness..., Aloud later performed the majority of the show in New York in 2009.

Music from Fan The Fury was heavily featured in Bad Habit Productions' presentation of The Laramie Project.

==== Lineup Changes and Live 2009 ====
The latter half 2008 saw significant changes to Aloud's core lineup. Bassist Roy Fontaine parted ways with the group in September 2008. Subsequently, Aloud toured as a three-piece during the Fall 2008 leg of the Fan The Fury tour. After the tour, former Baby Strange bassist Tim Hare filled in on bass for live shows for the remainder of the year.

Ross Lohr left the group shortly after Fontaine's departure. His final performance with the group was January 29, 2009 in Allston, MA. He still appeared in the music video for the song "Julie". Elaborating in an interview a year later, Henry and Jen stated Lohr left the band amicably "the day after we filmed the 'Julie' video" because he no longer enjoyed performing with the band and wished to dedicate more of his time to philanthropy.

Aloud performed the third and fourth legs of the Fan The Fury tour with a rotating cast of live members: Jonathan Schmidt (from the band Morningwood), Rob Lynch (ex-Harris), Travis Richter (from the bands The Motion Sick, Naked On Roller Skates, and Kingsley Flood), Jesse James Salucci (The Lights Out) and Tommy Mazalewski alternated on drums. Tim Hare, Ryan Majoris, and Matthew Girard (from the band The Motion Sick and Golden Bloom) alternated on bass.

Bassist Charles Murphy began performing with the group in October 2009, joining as a full-fledged member of the band shortly thereafter.

The free EP Live 2009 was released at the end of 2009, capping off Aloud's Fan The Fury era. The EP contained performances from one of the final shows of that tour at Howler's Coyote Cafe in Pittsburgh, Pennsylvania, on November 18, 2009. The live show was recorded, engineered, and mixed by Bengt Alexander. The EP was released to the public as a free digital download on December 31, 2009.

=== 2009-2011: Exile ===
From April 2009 to July 2010, Henry and Jen worked with producer Daniel Nicholas Daskivich on completing the third Aloud release, Exile. Teasing their work on the album in interviews, the band indicated Exile would be sonically different from previous Aloud releases.

The recording process initially began as "therapy", but quickly stretched on over the course of a year. Aloud's touring members and friends appeared as guests on several tracks, with Daskivich tackling the majority of the drumming on Exile. The group worked on the record song by song, often building instrumentation around an acoustic guitar. As a result, the record featured material that was sparser and far more experimental than previous albums.

The songs loosely drew upon de la Osa and Beguiristain's respective experiences as US-born children of Cuban exiles. Further inspiration was taken from Reinaldo Arenas’ memoir, Before Night Falls. Aloud launched their first crowdfunding campaign on the Kickstarter platform to pay for manufacturing of the record and defray costs associated with the tour in support of the album.

Exile was released on October 12, 2010, garnering some of the band’s strongest reviews, often focusing on Aloud’s expanded musical versatility. The subsequent US coast-to-coast US tour ran from October 2010 through January 2011, beginning at the 2010 CMJ Music Marathon. A second coast-to-coast leg included Aloud’s SXSW debut, and ran from mid-February through March 2011.

Aloud released a non-album single, “The Cash and the Pearls”, after the second leg of the tour. The recording reunited de la Osa and Beguiristain with Ross Lohr in the studio. Aloud celebrated the single's release with a tour of the south and midwest, followed by a month-long residency in Boston.

De la Osa and Beguiristain were approached earlier in the year by the Berklee College of Music to participate in BANDED, a documentary intended to become a part of the school's PULSE curriculum. The months-long project followed them and four other groups from the Boston area to document the life of a song, from its genesis to completion in the recording studio. The project culminated with the recording of "You Will Know" at Mad Oak Studios with head engineer Benny Grotto. Grotto encouraged Aloud to record the song as live as possible in the studio. The band found the experience enjoyable and booked a second session with Grotto at Mad Oak to record "Such a Long Time" in the same manner.

=== 2012-2015: A rock n’ roll band making music live ===
De la Osa and Beguiristain spent January and February 2012 writing new material for a follow-up to Exile. They resumed their tour schedule in March and began road-testing material which would eventually make up It’s Got To Be Now. In March they performed at Boston to Austin, a SXSW party produced by DigBoston and sponsored by Converse. There, they shared the stage with other Boston-based acts OldJack, Lake Street Dive, Bad Rabbits, The Wandas, and Moe Pope & Quills.

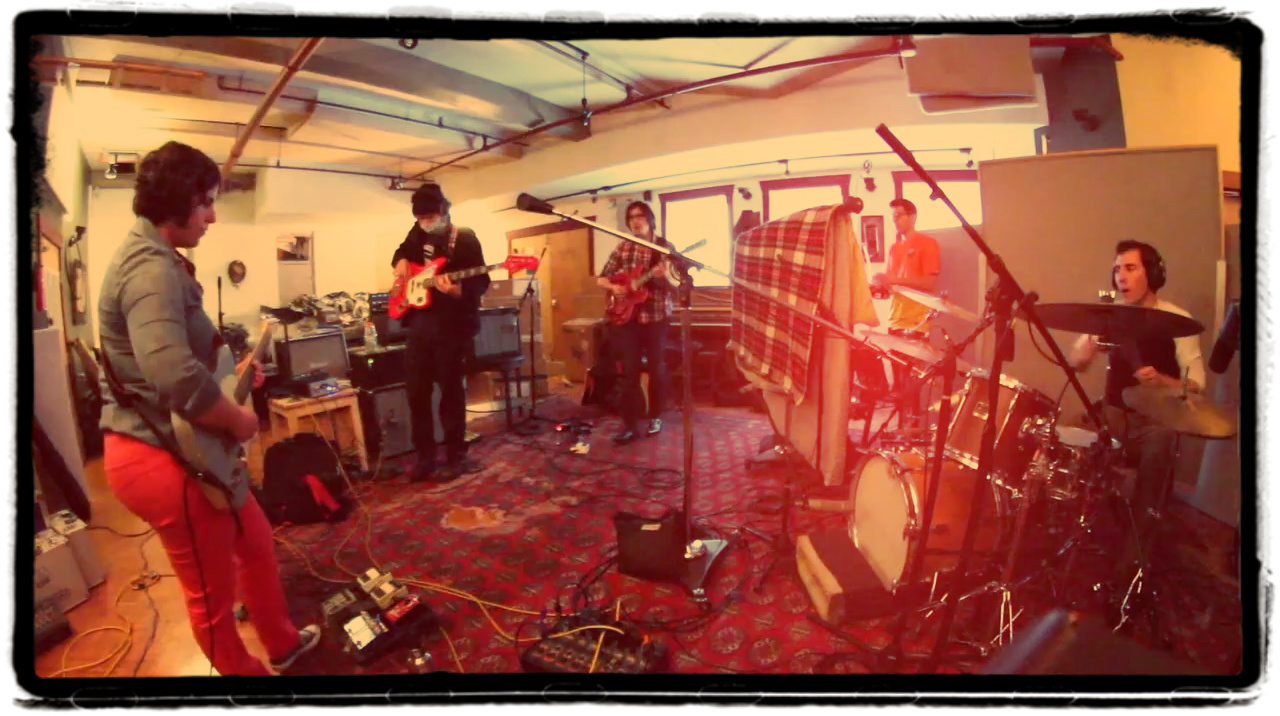
Aloud recording It's Got To Be Now at Mad Oak Studios. The majority of the album was recorded live in this configuration.

To mark their tenth anniversary as a band, the Boston Phoenix released a 10th anniversary EP collecting songs which “define the band’s evolution over the past decade”. A retrospective film directed by Stephen LoVerme, titled Aloud: I Can’t Believe That Worked, began production. Though the film was indefinitely shelved, a trailer was included with the release of the Boston Phoenix EP. The group was nominated in the Boston Phoenix's Best Music Poll for Best Indie/Powerpop Act.

Frank Hegyi joined as Aloud's permanent drummer in June 2012. Aloud continued touring throughout the summer and fall, debuting and refining songs. “You Will Know” was formally released as a 7-inch vinyl single in September, with “Such A Long Time” as its b-side.

==== It's Got To Be Now ====
Aloud returned to Mad Oak Studios with co-producer Benny Grotto in December 2012. In the same fashion as “Such A Long Time”, their performances were recorded live in the studio. To maintain the live element, percussionist Andy Wong was invited to record miscellaneous percussion with the band. Vocals were recorded at Serious Business in New York under the supervision of co-producer Charles Newman. Additional overdubs were tracked at Mad Oak Studios with Grotto in January 2013. In sum, the album took six days total to record. “This is what we’ve set out to make here,” the band wrote to fans at the time, “an album that sounds like a band playing music in a room together.”

It’s Got To Be Now’s first single, “A Little Bit Low”, was released in December 2013. The release of “A Little Bit Low” launched a Kickstarter campaign to help bring the album to completion. It’s Got To Be Now was released on April 1, 2014, to positive reception. The band toured on the record throughout the east coast, releasing four singles through the life of the album.

In February 2015, Aloud recorded a Converse Rubber Tracks session at Q Division Studios with Benny Grotto. The session yielded basic tracks for the songs “Empty House” and “Falling Out of Love”.

Frank Hegyi departed the band in May 2015. His final appearance with the band was on an episode of The Steve Katsos Show. According to Beguiristain, Hegyi simply felt it was time for him to step away from the band. “Having [Frank] around was pretty vital to us feeling good about being band at a time when we needed it,” he wrote in a post on Aloud's website. “We owe him for that, and we’re very grateful he decided to stick around as long as he did.”

=== 2015-2019: Move to Los Angeles ===
Chuck Ferreira became Aloud's drummer after Hegyi's departure. The band maintained an active tour schedule while working on new music for their next record. In October, they returned to the CMJ Music Marathon. In January 2016, the band released a live video for the song "In Spite of Language" for NPR Music's Tiny Desk Contest.

==== FOOL VR ====
In April 2016, Aloud announced they would collaborate on a virtual reality music video with director Skye Von, producer Tanya Leal-Soto, and Charles Newman. FOOL VR, as the collective was dubbed, partnered with the New York Institute of Technology, Evolving Technologies Corporation, and others to create a 360-degree video for the Aloud song "Falling Out of Love". A crowdfunding campaign was launched in April 2016 to help fund the production. Aloud toured and held events in New England, New York, and the west coast that spring to promote the project and demonstrate the technology using Mobile phones and Google Cardboard. Falling Out of Love: The VR Experience won Indiegogo and Independent film project's 2016 Fellowship. Falling Out of Love: The VR Experience is currently in post-production.

A 360° music video for "The Wicked Kind", another FOOL VR project directed by Skye Von, debuted September 2016 as an official selection of the Kaleidoscope 2016 Summer Showcase. The video toured with the showcase through North America, Europe, and Asia.

==== Fifth Studio album and "Agua Mala" ====
Aloud began work on their fifth studio album at the rebuilt Mad Oak Studios in Allston in August 2016, with Benny Grotto producing again. The band posted real-time updates from the studio via their Instagram account. Their next album was set to feature a sound more heavily rooted in Memphis soul. The record was mixed by Guy Massey, known for his work with The Libertines, Ray Davies, and The Beatles.

In February 2017, Aloud released the charity single “Agua Mala”, recorded in conjunction with NYC-based group Cold Blood Club. All proceeds from sales of the single and the release show at the Knitting Factory were sent to the United Way of Genesee County's Flint Water Fund to aid their work in the Flint water crisis. "Almost three years later," de la Osa remarked at the time, "and nothing significant has improved. Flint is still without clean drinking water and [there's] very little accountability. This shit makes you want to scream."

==== Empty House tour and move to Los Angeles ====
Shortly after the release of “Agua Mala”, Aloud announced they were permanently relocating the band from Boston to Los Angeles. Their Boston-area send-off was on March 4, 2017, at the Plough and Stars, performing with Peter Buzzelle. "Boston is the only place which, for better or for worse, has ever truly felt like home to me," Beguiristain wrote in a blog post, however adding that Boston had "become a tough place to live in, let alone maintain a functioning, working band."

A coast-to-coast US tour in support of the “Empty House”/”Falling Out of Love” double A-side vinyl single kicked off April 24, 2017 in New York. For the tour, Aloud partnered with the San Francisco-based Acid VR to document the tour with a Ricoh Theta 360° camera. A 360° video of Aloud rehearsing “Empty House” was released ahead of the Empty House tour. A 360° video for an acoustic version of “Falling Out of Love” performed at the Griffith Park Zoo was released at the tour's conclusion.

A music video for "Falling Out of Love" was released on February 14, 2018, to coincide with the song's full release.

Aloud expanded their lineup with the permanent addition of drummer Chris Jago, saxophonist Alanah Ntzouras, and trumpet player Vanessa Acosta. In 2018, the band toured the Northeast to promote the film All These Small Moments, which featured two Aloud songs on its soundtrack.

From late 2018 through 2019, Aloud resumed self-releasing music under Lemon Merchant Records, producing a series of singles including "Son of the Dharma," "Children of the Divine," and "Live TV." These tracks, along with their B-sides, would later be compiled into the City Lights EP, culminating in a performance at the Bootleg Theater in Los Angeles.

=== 2020-2021: Sprezzatura and the COVID-19 pandemic ===
In January 2020, Aloud released "Been So Long Since We've Seen the Sun," a track from their fifth studio album Sprezzatura, which was recorded at Mad Oak Studios in Boston in 2016 and completed in 2017. Following this, "Loving U's a Beautiful Thing" was released as the first single in February 2020.

However, the COVID-19 pandemic disrupted the albums's release plans, touring schedules, and live performances for the ensuing two years. The video for the second single, "Waiting (Scenes From a Lonely Planet)," was partially filmed before the Los Angeles lockdowns were imposed. To engage with their audience during this time, Aloud launched an online listening experience called The Deep Listen, providing a deep dive into making of the album.

Sprezzatura was ultimately released on May 8, 2020.

In June 2020, the band began collaborating remotely on what would become their sixth studio album, Apollo 6.

To commemorate the tenth anniversary of their third album Exile, they released an expanded edition in October 2020, which included the original album alongside a double album of demos and unreleased songs titled Shadows of Another Place: The Exile Demos. This release was celebrated with an online streaming event featuring previously unreleased concert footage from the release show for Exile in Boston in September 2010, titled "A Line of Lights."

In 2021, Aloud continued to work remotely on their next studio album. During this period, co-leads Jen de la Osa and Henry Beguiristain primarily wrote songs separately, while band meetings were conducted over Zoom. Drummer Chris Jago recorded his drum parts at Shabby Road Studios, while Jen, Henry, and Charles collaborated at South Endustries, recording vocals, guitars, bass, and keyboards often months after the initial drum recordings. Throughout the pandemic, Aloud maintained engagement with their fans by sending out a weekly email newsletter that provided updates on the album's progress.

In February 2021, Aloud released another previously unreleased concert filmed at the Paramount in Boston in 2015, which they livestreamed on YouTube. This concert featured material from It’s Got to Be Now, their back catalog, and included the debut performances of the songs "Empty House" and "Falling Out of Love."

In May 2021, Aloud recorded a live in-studio concert featuring material from Sprezzatura, releasing the recordings under the title "Scenes From a Lonely Planet."

Later in May 2021, with the band and crew having received long-awaited vaccinations, Aloud completed filming the music video for "Waiting (Scenes From a Lonely Planet." The finished video was released at the end of June and was directed by Frank Hegyi. This marked a significant moment for the band, as it was their first major project since the onset of the pandemic.

In the same month, Aloud gathered together for their first in-person rehearsal in 18 months, reconnecting as a band after a prolonged period of remote collaboration. This reunion was a pivotal moment for the group, reinvigorating their dynamic and creative process.

=== 2022-Present: Apollo 6 and Observer Affect ===
The band continued their recording sessions throughout 2021 and into April 2022, culminating in the completion of their album Apollo 6. This album showcased the evolution of their sound and the resilience of the band in navigating the challenges posed by the pandemic.

In the summer of 2022, Aloud performed their first show since September 2019 at a private event in Tujunga, where they debuted a new song from Apollo 6 titled "The Comeback Kid." Later that summer, they took the stage at Harvard and Stone, showcasing a significant amount of new material from the upcoming album.

"The Comeback Kid" was released as the album's first single on November 11, 2022, accompanied by a lyric video and the announcement of the album's release date set for May 2023. Following this, the band released three additional singles: "Somewhere to Be," "Meditation for the Housebound," and "Big Blue," both of which featured music videos. Throughout the year, Aloud continued to perform live, reconnecting with fans and promoting their new music.

Apollo 6 represented a more sonically experimental direction for Aloud, with songs that were deeply personal, reflecting their experiences and thoughts throughout the pandemic. The album garnered attention, with Paste listing it as an anticipated release and providing a positive review upon its launch. To celebrate the album, Aloud held a release show at the Silverlake Lounge later that same month.

In the summer of 2023, Aloud began working on new material, inspired by The Beatles: Get Back documentary. They engaged in a more collaborative creation process, with Jen de la Osa and Henry Beguiristain co-writing more closely than before. Instead of recording demos, the band opted to rehearse and arrange songs together in person. In August, they gathered at Shabby Road Studios to record live, capturing not only the instrumentation but also the vocals. This process was repeated in January 2024, further refining their sound.

In February 2024, Aloud performed at The Echo in Los Angeles alongside Livingmore, where they debuted several new songs. The culmination of their recent work resulted in the EP, set for release on December 6, 2024. The first single, "The Sky's in Love With You," was released on October 4, 2024, accompanied by a music video showcasing the live in-studio recording process.

A second single, "A Week Without Rain," followed on November 1, 2024.

== Discography ==
Studio albums

- Apollo 6 (2023)
- Sprezzatura (2020)
- It's Got To Be Now (2014)
- Exile (2010)
- Fan The Fury (2008)
- Leave Your Light On (2006)

== Members ==
=== Current members ===
- Henry Beguiristain: vocals, guitar, piano/keys (2002–present)
- Jen de la Osa: vocals, guitar, piano/keys (2002–present)
- Charles Murphy: bass, mouth sounds (2009–present)
- Alanah Ntzouras Maguire: saxophone (2017–present)

==== Touring and session musicians ====
- Andy Bergman: saxophone (2016–present)
- Maxwell Butler: keys (2012–present)
- Chuck Ferreira: drums, percussion (2018–present)
- Chris Jago: drums, percussion (2024–present)
- Eric Ortiz: trumpet (2016–present)

=== Past members ===
- Vanessa Acosta: trumpet (2017–2022)
- Chuck Ferreira: drums, percussion (2015–2017)
- Roy Fontaine: bass, backing vocals (2002–2008)
- Frank Hegyi: drums, percussion (2012–2015)
- Chris Jago: drums, percussion (2017–2024)
- Ross Lohr: drums, percussion (2003–2009)

== Trademark ==
Issues surfaced in early 2005 with an electro-pop French duo going by the same moniker. The duo consisted of Cyril Bodin and Gregory Louis. Paperwork submitted by Bodin and Louis to the United States Patent and Trademark Office (SN: 76580505) is open to the public and can be viewed at the United States Patent and Trademark Office.

The main argument was in first use dates. Bodin and Louis listed September 23, 2003 as the date of first use. De la Osa and Beguiristain argued their first use in commerce of the name “Aloud” had been used prior (May, 2002). Bodin and Louis' application has remained in stasis January 21, 2005. However, Bodin and Louis broke the group up in 2005, making the point moot and clearing the way for the American 'Aloud' to use the name without any foreseeable hindrance.
