= Flare Acoustic Arts League =

American pop band

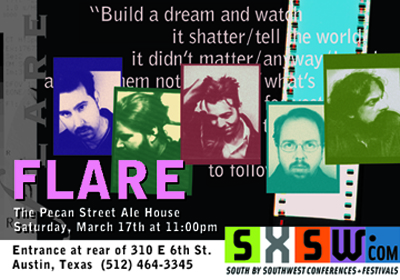

Background information
- Also known as: Flare
- Origin: Bushwick, Brooklyn
- Genres: Orchpop; Chamber punk Experimental pop Psychedelic
- Years active: 1996–2012
- Labels: Tamper Evident, Mother West, Le Grand Magistery, Affairs of the Heart
- Members: LD Beghtol + a cast of thousands...

Flare Acoustic Arts League — A.K.A. Flare (band) — were an experimental pop band formed by guitarist Damian Costilla and singer LD Beghtol in New York in 1996 who made intense, darkly romantic, atmospheric songs deeply influenced by their love of The Smiths, The Magnetic Fields (with whom beghtol sometimes collaborated), Love, various 4AD bands and The Velvet Underground. Flare soon became a small chamber ensemble, augmenting Costilla's guitar work with other instrumentalists for recording/live shows. Costilla left Flare shortly after the release of their debut CD, Bottom (Tamper Evident, 1997). Beghtol continued to record and perform under the Flare moniker until 2001, when he renamed the band Flare Acoustic Arts League.

Beghtol then became Flare's principal songwriter/musical director, and expanded its dreamy minimalism to vastly orchestral arrangements that pitted horns and strings, heavily treated guitars and noise loops against florid melodies and esoteric subject matter. The band's swansong, an ersatz "double EP" entitled Big Top/Encore, which included originals and covers of the swirling Psychedelic Furs song "Yes I Do" and "Morgantown" by the enigmatic Brooklynite Dorsey among its 10 tracks, was released by Affairs of the Heart in August 2011 in various digital and vinyl formats. Flare formally ceased trading in 2012 after the band’s first—and only—tour of Germany and Austria.

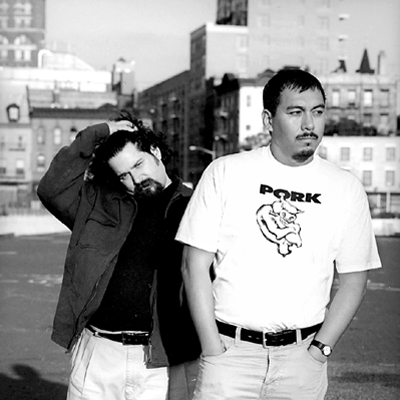
LD & Damian, circa 1997

== Selected discography ==
CDs

- Cut, (Affairs of the Heart, 2009)
- Hung, (Le Grand Magistery, 2003)
- Bottom, (Tamper Evident, 1997)

EPs

- Big Top/Encore, double EP/CD/vinyl (Affairs of the Heart, 2011)
- Definitive, (Mother West, 2001)
- Circa, (Subliminal Violence, 2000)

Singles

- "Hands of Fire”/"Last Train to Clarksville"/“Infamous Last Words," digital single (Affairs of the Heart, 2009)
- "Back When You Wanted Me"/"Wish It Away," 7-inch vinyl (Unpopular Records, 2005)
- "Celebrate the Misery”/“Another Bridge,” 7-inch vinyl (Mother West, 2000)
