= Stephin Merritt discography =

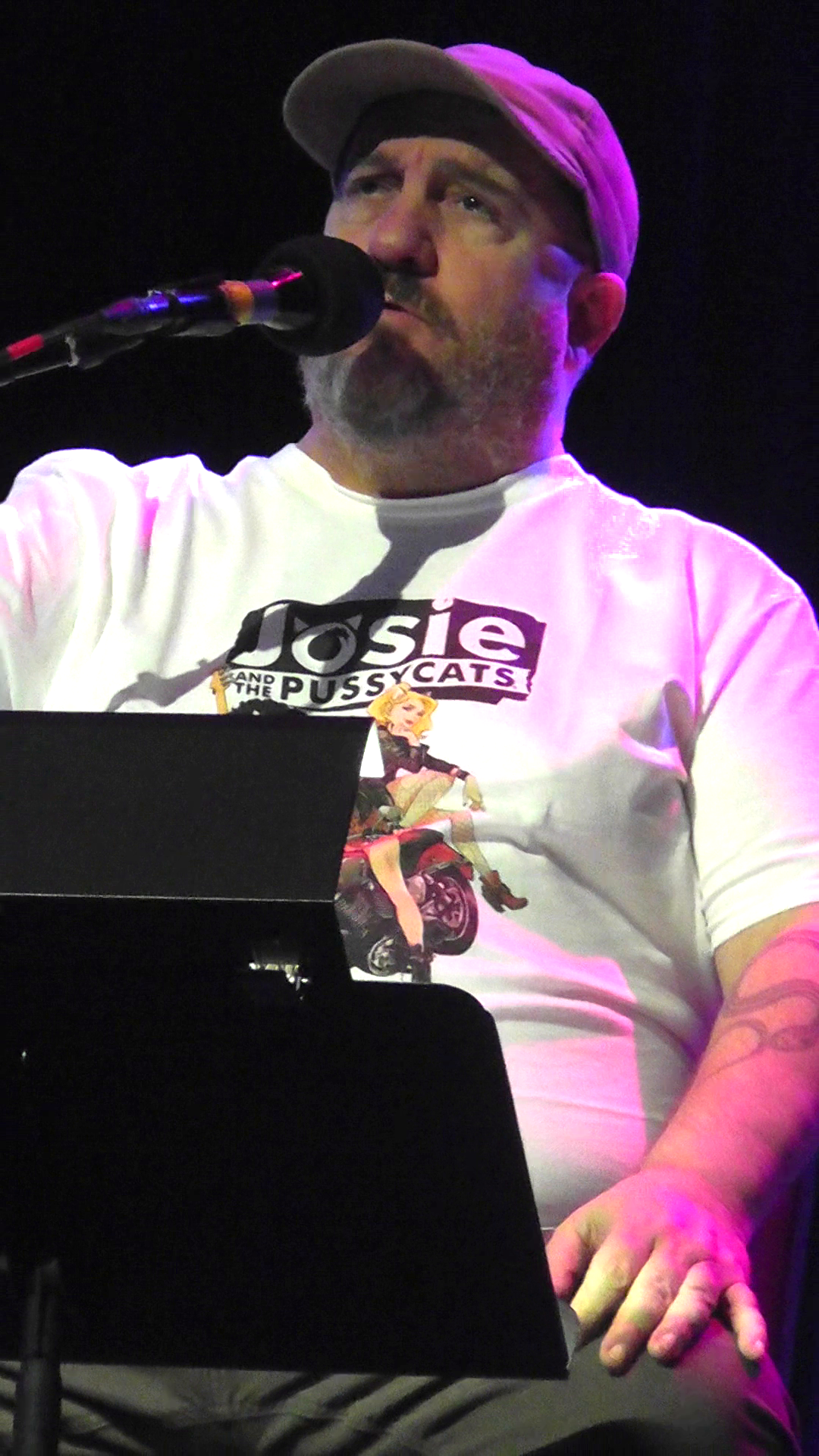
Merritt at Town Hall in NYC, 2024

This article is a detailed listing of releases by singer-songwriter Stephin Merritt, including the discographies of the Magnetic Fields, the Gothic Archies, the 6ths, Future Bible Heroes, and solo releases by Merritt.

== The Magnetic Fields ==
The Magnetic Fields discography
- Studio albums: 12
- Extended plays: 1
- Compilation albums: 1
- Singles: 14

=== Studio Albums ===
Title	Details
Distant Plastic Trees	Release date: 1991; Label: Red Flame; Format: CD
The Wayward Bus	Release date: Label: PoPuP Records; Format: CD
The Charm of the Highway Strip	Release date: April 18, 1994; Label: Merge Records; Format: CD, Cassette, LP
Holiday	Release date: September 27, 1994; Label: Feel Good All Over; Format: CD, LP
Get Lost	Release date: October 24, 1995; Label: Merge Records; Format: CD, LP
69 Love Songs	Release date: September 7, 1999; Label: Merge Records; Format: CD, LP
i	Release date: May 4, 2004; Label: Nonesuch Records; Format: CD, LP
Distortion	Release date: January 15, 2008; Label: Nonesuch Records; Format: CD, LP
Realism	Release date: January 26, 2010; Label: Nonesuch Records; Format: CD, LP, Digital download
Love at the Bottom of the Sea	Release date: March 5, 2012; Label: Merge Records; Format: CD, LP, Digital download, Streaming
50 Song Memoir	Release date: March 10, 2017; Label: Nonesuch Records; Format: CD, LP, Digital download, Streaming
Quickies	Release date: May 29, 2020; Label: Nonesuch Records; Format: CD, LP, Digital download, Streaming

=== Extended Plays ===
Title	EP details
The House of Tomorrow	Released: 1992; Label: Harriet Records, Feel Good All Over; Format: 7", CD

=== Compilation albums ===
Title	Details
The Wayward Bus / Distant Plastic Trees	Release date: 1995; Label: Merge Records; Format: CD, Cassette, LP

=== Singles ===
Title	Year	Album
"100,000 Fireflies"	1991	Distant Plastic Trees
"Long Vermont Roads"	1992	The Charm of the Highway Strip
"All the Umbrellas in London"	1995	Get Lost
"Why I Cry"	1995	Get Lost
"I Don't Believe You"	1998	Non album single (Note: An Alternate rendition appears on i.)
"I Thought You Were My Boyfriend"	2004	i
"California Girls"	2007	Distortion
"Three-Way"	2008	Distortion
"Please Stop Dancing"	2008	Distortion
"Andrew in Drag"	2012	Love at the Bottom of the Sea
"Quick!"	2012	Love at the Bottom of the Sea
"'81: How To Play The Synthesizer"	2017	50 Song Memoir
"'83: Foxx And I"	2017	50 Song Memoir
"The Day The Politicians Died"	2020	Quickies

=== Non-album releases ===
- "Plant White Roses" (Stephin Merritt re-recording), 5 Rows of Teeth (1994)
- "Heroes", Crash Course for the Ravers: A Tribute to the Songs of David Bowie (1996)
- "I Die: You Die", Random: Gary Numan Tribute (1997)
- "Le Tourbillon", Pop Romantique: French Pop Classics (1999)
- "Take Ecstasy with Me" (original Susan Anway recording), Oh Merge (1999)
- "If I Were a Rich Man", Knitting on the Roof (1999)

== The Gothic Archies ==
The Gothic Archies discography
- Studio albums: 1
- Extended plays: 2

=== Studio albums ===
Title	Details
The Tragic Treasury: Songs from A Series of Unfortunate Events	Released: October 10, 2006; Label: Nonesuch Records; Formats: CD

=== Extended Plays ===
Title	Details
Looming in the Gloom	Release date: March, 1996; Label: Hello Recording Club; Format: CD
The New Despair	Release date: 1997; Label: Merge Records; Format: CD

== The 6ths ==
The 6ths discography
- Studio albums: 2
- Singles: 2

=== Studio Albums ===
Title	Details
Wasps' Nests	Release date: 1995; Label: London Records; Formats: CD, Cassette, LP
Hyacinths and Thistles	Release date: 2000; Label: Merge Records; Format: CD

=== Singles ===
Title	Year	Album
"Heaven In A Black Leather Jacket"	1993	Wasps' Nests
"San Diego Zoo"	1995	Wasps' Nests

== Future Bible Heroes ==
Future Bible Heroes discography
- Studio albums: 3
- Extended plays: 2
- Compilation albums: 1
- Singles: 2

=== Studio albums ===
Title	Details
Memories of Love	Release date: 1997; Label: Slow River Records, Rykodisc; Formats: CD, Digital download
Eternal Youth	Release date: August 2002; Label: Instinct Records; Formats: CD
Partygoing	Release date: June 4, 2013; Label: Merge Records; Formats: CD

=== Compilation albums ===
Title	Details
Memories Of Love, Eternal Youth, And Partygoing	Release date: 2013; Label: Merge Records; Formats: LP

=== Extended Plays ===
Title	Details
I'm Lonely (And I Love It)	Release date: 2000; Label: Merge Records; Formats: CD
The Lonely Robot	Release date: 2002; Label Instinct Records; Format: CD

=== Singles ===
Title	Year	Album
"Lonely Days"	1998	Memories of Love
"The World Is a Disco Ball"	2003	Eternal Youth

== Solo ==
Stephin Merritt discography
- Soundtrack albums: 4
- Compilation albums: 1
- Singles: 1

=== Soundtrack albums ===
Title	Details
Eban and Charley	Release date: January 22, 2002; Label: Merge Records; Format: CD
Pieces of April	Release date: November 4, 2003; Label: Nonesuch; Format: CD, Digital download
Showtunes	Release date: March 16, 2006; Label: Nonesuch Records; Format: CD, Digital download
"Coraline (Original Off-Broadway Cast Recording)"	Release date: 2010; Label: Ghostlight Records; Format: CD

=== Compilation albums ===
Title	Details
Obscurities	Release date: August 21, 2011; Label: Merge Records; Format: CD, LP

=== Singles ===
Title	Year	Album
"I'm In A Lonely Way"	2007	Non album single

=== Non-album releases ===
- "The Meaning of Lice", Plague Songs (2006)
- "The Man of a Million Faces", NPR Music: Two Days with Project Song (2007)
- "Beauty", Stroke: Songs for Chris Knox (2009)
- "Not One Of Us", I'll Scratch Yours (2010)
- "Dream Again", Covers E.P. (2011)
