= Quickies (album) =

Studio album by the Magnetic Fields
- Released: May 29, 2020
- Recorded: Cottage Sounds, Decibelle, Mad Oak
- Genres: Indie rock, indie pop
- Length: 46:40
- Label: Nonesuch
- Producer: Stephin Merritt

The Magnetic Fields chronology
50 Song Memoir (2017)	Quickies (2020)

Singles from Quickies
- 1. "The Day The Politicians Died" Released: 2020

Quickies is the twelfth studio album by the Magnetic Fields. The album consists of 28 songs, each of which is between 0:17 and 2:35 in length. For the album's concept, Magnetic Fields singer and songwriter Stephin Merritt was influenced by the short fiction of Lydia Davis and the writing of his own book of Scrabble poetry.

== Release ==
Quickies is available as a box set of five 7" records or as a CD. The US release of the CD was delayed to June 19. A single LP release was done for Record Store Day of the same year, pressed on pink vinyl and featuring a bonus track on Side A - "The Witches' Fly".

== Reception ==
Professional ratings
Aggregate scores
Source	Rating
Metacritic	74/100
Review scores
Source	Rating
AllMusic	3.5/5 stars
And It Don't Stop	(2-star Honorable Mention)
Beats Per Minute	78%
Exclaim!	8/10
MusicOMH	3.5/5 stars
Pitchfork	7.3/10
Slant Magazine	4/5 stars

Quickies was met with generally positive reviews. At Metacritic, which assigns a weighted average rating out of 100 to reviews from professional publications, the album received an average score of 74, based on 11 reviews.

Marc Hogan from Pitchfork said that the album "thrives" on the shortness of its songs, and Slant Magazine stated that Merritt "[flourishes] under the constraints he sets for himself". In his "Consumer Guide," Robert Christgau singled out the following tracks as highlights – "I Wish I Were a Prostitute Again", "My Stupid Boyfriend", "Come, Life, Shaker Life!", and "The Best Cup of Coffee in Tennessee" – and summarized the album as "28 songs in 48 minutes, too few as clever as you'd hope, several rather nice, more than that stupider than this very smart man believes".

== Track listing ==
All tracks are written by Stephin Merritt.

No.	Title	Length
1.	"Castles of America"	0:34
2.	"The Biggest Tits in History"	2:12
3.	"The Day the Politicians Died"	1:57
4.	"Castle Down a Dirt Road"	1:47
5.	"Bathroom Quickie"	0:46
6.	"My Stupid Boyfriend"	2:01
7.	"Love Gone Wrong"	2:13
8.	"Favorite Bar"	1:12
9.	"Kill a Man a Week"	0:59
10.	"Kraftwerk in a Blackout"	1:49
11.	"When She Plays the Toy Piano"	2:06
12.	"Death Pact (Let's Make A)"	0:17
13.	"I've Got a Date with Jesus"	2:16
14.	"Come, Life, Shaker Life!"	2:35
15.	"(I Want to Join A) Biker Gang"	2:21
16.	"Rock 'n' Roll Guy"	2:33
17.	"You've Got a Friend in Beelzebub"	1:13
18.	"Let's Get Drunk Again (And Get Divorced)"	1:15
19.	"The Best Cup of Coffee In Tennessee"	2:07
20.	"When the Brat Upstairs Got a Drum Kit"	1:52
21.	"The Price You Pay"	1:52
22.	"The Boy in the Corner"	0:55
23.	"Song of the Ant"	0:43
24.	"I Wish I Had Fangs and a Tail"	1:51
25.	"Evil Rhythm"	1:47
26.	"She Says Hello"	1:01
27.	"The Little Robot Girl"	2:11
28.	"I Wish I Were a Prostitute Again"	2:15

== Personnel ==
The Magnetic Fields

- Stephin Merritt – ARP Axxe synthesizer, Veillette Avante 12-string acoustic guitar, banjoleles, cigar box ukulele, electric guitar, Mellotron, Moog instruments, Octave Cat synthesizer, unprogrammed drum machines, vocals
- Sam Davol – wine box cello, Infinite Jets
- Claudia Gonson – vocals, one-hand piano, cigar box percussion
- Shirley Simms – vocals, three-chord autoharp, Omnichord
- John Woo – unamplified electric guitar, cigar box guitar

Other Personnel

- Chris Ewen – prepared piano, Mellotron
- Benny Grotto – Optigan percussion
- Daniel Handler – accordion, celeste
- Pinky Weitzman – cigar box violin, Stroh violin

== Charts ==
Chart (2020)	Peak position
Hungarian Albums (MAHASZ)	27
