= Love at the Bottom of the Sea =

Studio album by The Magnetic Fields
- Released: March 5, 2012
- Recorded: Los Angeles; San Francisco; New York
- Genre: Synth-pop, indie pop
- Length: 34:09
- Label: Merge (US), Domino (UK)
- Producer: Stephin Merritt

The Magnetic Fields chronology
Realism (2010)	Love at the Bottom of the Sea (2012)	50 Song Memoir (2017)

Singles from Love at the Bottom of the Sea
- 1. "Andrew in Drag" Released: 2012; 2. "Quick" Released: 2012

Love at the Bottom of the Sea is the tenth studio album by American indie pop band the Magnetic Fields. It was released in the U.K. on March 5, 2012, by record label Domino and in the U.S. on March 6, 2012, by Merge.

Two singles, "Andrew in Drag" and "Quick!", were released from the album.

== Recording ==
The album was recorded by Stephin Merritt and Charles Newman at Bell Tree in Los Angeles; Mother West, Serious Business Records and Dubway Studios in New York; and Tiny Telephone Studios in San Francisco.

It is the band's first release with Merge since 1999's 69 Love Songs. After releasing three albums relatively free of synthesizers as part of a "no-synth trilogy" (2004's i, 2008's Distortion, and 2010's Realism), Love at the Bottom of the Sea features the blend of acoustic and synthesized instruments that the band was known for in the 1990s. Stephin Merritt claims he took a fresh approach with the instrumentation, stating "Most of the synthesizers on the record didn't exist when we were last using synthesizers." All of the tracks on the album are between two minutes and three minutes long, with the closing track being the longest at two minutes and thirty-eight seconds.

== Release ==
Love at the Bottom of the Sea was released in the U.K. on March 5, 2012, by record label Domino and in the U.S. on March 6, 2012, by Merge.

== Reception ==
Professional ratings
Aggregate scores
Source	Rating
AnyDecentMusic?	6.7/10
Metacritic	68/100
Review scores
Source	Rating
AllMusic	3/5 stars
The A.V. Club	B−
The Guardian	3/5 stars
Los Angeles Times	2.5/4 stars
MSN Music (Expert Witness)	A−
NME	7/10
Pitchfork	6.1/10
Q	3/5 stars
Rolling Stone	3.5/5 stars
Spin	8/10

The reception from critics has been generally favorable, with the average critical score being a 68 out of 100 according to review aggregator website Metacritic.

== Track listing ==
All tracks are written by Stephin Merritt.

No.	Title	Lead vocals	Length
1.	"God Wants Us to Wait"	Shirley Simms	2:06
2.	"Andrew in Drag"	Stephin Merritt	2:13
3.	"Your Girlfriend's Face"	Simms	2:20
4.	"Born For Love"	Merritt	2:40
5.	"I'd Go Anywhere with Hugh"	Simms	2:08
6.	"Infatuation (With Your Gyration)"	Merritt	2:14
7.	"The Only Boy in Town"	Simms	2:35
8.	"The Machine in Your Hand"	Merritt & Simms	2:24
9.	"Goin' Back to the Country"	Simms	2:00
10.	"I've Run Away to Join the Fairies"	Merritt	2:16
11.	"The Horrible Party"	Simms	2:08
12.	"My Husband's Pied-à-Terre"	Claudia Gonson	2:05
13.	"I Don't Like Your Tone"	Merritt	2:08
14.	"Quick!"	Simms	2:28
15.	"All She Cares About Is Mariachi"	Merritt	2:38

== Personnel ==
The Magnetic Fields

- Stephin Merritt – lead vocals on tracks 2, 4, 6, 7, 8, 10, 13 and 15, keyboards, synthesizers, guitar
- Claudia Gonson – backing vocals, piano, percussion, tambourine
- Sam Davol – cello, flute
- John Woo – guitar, banjo
- Shirley Simms – lead vocals on tracks 1, 3, 5, 8, 9, 11, 12, and 14, autoharp

Additional personnel

- Pinky Weitzman – violin, viola, Stroh violin, musical saw
- Daniel Handler – accordion, organ
- Johnny Blood – tuba, flugelhorn, alto horn
- Randy Walker – vocals
