= Pieces of April (soundtrack) =

Soundtrack album by Stephin Merritt
- Released: November 4, 2003
- Genre: Indie pop
- Label: Nonesuch; 79860

Stephin Merritt chronology
Eban and Charley (2002)	Pieces of April (2003)	Showtunes (2006)

Professional ratings
Aggregate scores
Source	Rating
Metacritic	77/100
Review scores
Source	Rating
AllMusic	4/5 stars
Blender	2/5 stars
Entertainment Weekly	B
The Guardian	4/5 stars
Pitchfork	7.2/10
Rolling Stone	3/5 stars
Stylus Magazine	B−

Pieces of April is the soundtrack to the film of the same name. Written by Stephin Merritt and performed by his various bands, it was released on November 4, 2003 on Nonesuch Records. Three of the songs were previously released on The Magnetic Fields' 69 Love Songs, and "As You Turn to Go" and "You You You You You" were previously seen on The 6ths' album, Hyacinths and Thistles.

== Track listing ==
- All songs by Stephin Merritt, performers in parentheses.
1. "All I Want to Know" (The Magnetic Fields)
2. "As You Turn to Go" (The 6ths)
3. "Dreams Anymore" (The Magnetic Fields)
4. "Epitaph for My Heart" (The Magnetic Fields)
5. "Heather Heather" (The Magnetic Fields)
6. "I Think I Need a New Heart" (The Magnetic Fields)
7. "One April Day" (Stephin Merritt)
8. "Stray with Me" (The Magnetic Fields)
9. "The Luckiest Guy on the Lower East Side" (The Magnetic Fields)
10. "You You You You You" (The 6ths)

== Personnel ==
Made by Stephin Merritt with:

- Katharine Whalen, vocals on "You You You You You"
- Dudley Klute, vocals on "The Luckiest Guy on the Lower East Side"
- Momus, vocals on "As You Turn to Go"
- Sam Davol, cello
- John Woo, guitar
- Claudia Gonson, drums, piano, background vocals
- Ida Pearle, violin
- Brian Dewan, zither
