= Holiday (The Magnetic Fields album) =

Studio album by The Magnetic Fields
- Released: September 27, 1994
- Recorded: 1993
- Genre: Synthpop, indie pop
- Length: 36:20
- Label: Feel Good All Over, Merge
- Producer: Stephin Merritt

The Magnetic Fields chronology
The Charm of the Highway Strip (1994)	Holiday (1994)	Get Lost (1995)

Holiday is the fourth studio album by American indie pop band the Magnetic Fields. The album was the band's third to be recorded and was intended to be released prior to The Charm of the Highway Strip through the label Feel Good All Over, but due to the label delaying its release, was issued in 1994 five months after its successor. Merge Records would later rerelease the album in 1999.

== Background ==
During the recording of Holiday, original Magnetic Fields vocalist Susan Anway left the band, moving from the band's native Massachusetts to Arizona. Rather than search for a new vocalist for the band, Magnetic Fields leader Stephin Merritt decided to sing the songs he had been writing instead. Nonetheless, an alternate version of Holiday closing track "Take Ecstasy with Me" with Anway on vocals featured on the compilation Oh, Merge: A Merge Records 10 Year Anniversary Compilation (1999).

== Music ==
Holiday features a synthpop sound, particularly one reminiscent of the genre's early 1980s heyday. Stewart Mason of AllMusic compared the album's sound to that of Architecture & Morality-era Orchestral Manoeuvres in the Dark. While the songs on the album are accessible and melodic, they nonetheless exude a "chilly tone" and fondness for what Mason described as "odd noises and unexpected accents."

Merritt's instrumentation on the album consists of simply "a closetful of early Casio, Yamaha and other keyboards," which Merritt layers over each other. Trouser Press felt the album consists of songs with Casio keyboards as their foundation, albeit "accessorized" with "the unconventional bookends of Johny Blood's tuba and Sam Davol's cello." Doug Bleggi of Stereogum felt the album blurs the line between guitars and synthesizers.

Holiday opens with "BBC Radiophonic Workshop", named after the electronic pioneers of the same name. With its lo-fi production and combination of synthesized and acoustic instrumentation, the 20-second track features an "oddly eccentric looping of tones". "Desert Island" makes use of fuzzy reverb. "Deep Sea Diving Suit" makes use of a jew harp-style sound. Len Comaratta of Consequence of Sound wrote: "The upbeat, quirky, plucking sound associated with the instrument sails along as if it was bed music to the song itself."

Stephin Merritt sings in a deep baritone voice. Ryan Schreiber of Pitchfork compared his vocals on the album to those of Calvin Johnson. In the words of Mason, the phrasing of the album's lyrics "vacillates mostly between the poles of deadpan wryness and romantic longing" and, with their "striking imagery" and "Cole Porter-level rhymes", mix mordant wit with unabashed romanticism.

== Release ==
Though Holiday was completed in 1993, it took a long time for John Henderson, the owner of the band's then-current label Feel Good All Over, to release it on the label, and by the time the label did eventually release it in 1994, the band had signed to Merge Records, which had already released their fourth recorded album The Charm of the Highway Strip that April. The close release dates of the two albums meant that some magazines reviewed the albums together, which annoyed Merritt. It has also been speculated that this would have meant consumers would buy one of the two albums, but not both.

In anticipation of the band's then-upcoming 69 Love Songs album, Merge Records re-released Holiday on January 12, 1999, alongside a re-release of the band's 1992 EP The House of Tomorrow.

== Reception ==
Professional ratings
Review scores
Source	Rating
AllMusic	4.5/5 stars
Christgau's Consumer Guide	(3-star Honorable Mention)
Pitchfork	8.8/10
The Rolling Stone Album Guide	3/5 stars
Spin Alternative Record Guide	8/10

Reviewing Holiday for AllMusic, Stewart Mason described the songwriting on the record as "a huge leap beyond the first two Magnetic Fields albums" and felt that "[e]very track here is a winner." Robert Christgau gave Holiday a three-star honorable mention rating, quipping that it contains "more songs about songs and songs" and highlighting "Strange Powers" and "Swinging London". In a write-up for Pitchfork, Ryan Schreiber called Holiday a "classic" and "definitely an inspired record."

== Legacy ==
The intro of "The Flowers She Sent and the Flowers She Said She Sent" was used in an episode ("Nightcrawlers") of Nickelodeon's The Adventures of Pete & Pete. The song "Strange Powers" was used in an episode ("Forget the Herring") of HBO's Bored to Death.

In 2017, Exclaim! ranked Holiday second in their list of Stephin Merritt's best albums, and Stereogum ranked Holiday fifth in their list of Stephin Merritt albums rated from worst to best.

== Track listing ==
All tracks are written by Stephin Merritt.

No.	Title	Length
1.	"BBC Radiophonic Workshop"	0:22
2.	"Desert Island"	3:34
3.	"Deep Sea Diving Suit"	2:05
4.	"Strange Powers"	2:41
5.	"Torn Green Velvet Eyes"	4:22
6.	"The Flowers She Sent and the Flowers She Said She Sent"	2:26
7.	"Swinging London"	2:35
8.	"In My Secret Place"	1:41
9.	"Sad Little Moon"	2:12
10.	"The Trouble I've Been Looking For"	2:23
11.	"Sugar World"	3:19
12.	"All You Ever Do Is Walk Away"	2:06
13.	"In My Car"	2:57
14.	"Take Ecstasy with Me"	3:30
Total length:		36:20

== Personnel ==
The Magnetic Fields

- Stephin Merritt – vocals, instrumentation
- Claudia Gonson – toys and management
- Sam Davol – cello

Additional personnel

- Johny Blood – tuba
