= Realism (The Magnetic Fields album) =

Studio album by The Magnetic Fields
- Released: January 26, 2010
- Recorded: Mother West, New York
- Genre: Folk; chamber pop; psychedelic folk
- Length: 33:17
- Label: Nonesuch
- Producer: Stephin Merritt

The Magnetic Fields chronology
Distortion (2008)	Realism (2010)	Love at the Bottom of the Sea (2012)

Professional ratings
Aggregate scores
Source	Rating
AnyDecentMusic?	7.0/10
Metacritic	72/100
Review scores
Source	Rating
AllMusic	3.5/5 stars
The A.V. Club	A−
Entertainment Weekly	A
The Guardian	4/5 stars
The Independent	4/5 stars
Los Angeles Times	2.5/4 stars
NME	8/10
Pitchfork	6.0/10
Q	3/5 stars
Spin	4/5 stars

Realism is the ninth studio album by American indie pop band the Magnetic Fields. It was officially released on January 26, 2010, by Nonesuch Records.

== Content ==
Described by songwriter Stephin Merritt as his "folk album", the instrumentation of Realism is largely acoustic, stark in contrast to the band's previous album, Distortion, released in 2008. Merritt said he "thought of the two records as a pair" and considered titling the albums True and False, but ultimately could not decide which title would correspond with which album. The song "The Dada Polka" is the only track to feature an electric guitar. Merritt also avoided using a traditional drum kit, further separating the sound of Realism from the noise pop of Distortion. Along with Distortion and the 2004 album i, Realism was also recorded without the use of synthesizers, completing the band's "no-synth trilogy".

Joshua Rifkin, who arranged the Judy Collins albums In My Life and Wildflowers, was cited by Merritt as a creative influence for Realism.

== Track listing ==
All tracks are written by Stephin Merritt.

No.	Title	Lead vocals	Length
1.	"You Must Be Out of Your Mind"	Stephin Merritt	3:12
2.	"Interlude"	Shirley Simms	2:11
3.	"We Are Having a Hootenanny"	Merritt, Simms & Claudia Gonson	2:10
4.	"I Don't Know What to Say"	Merritt	2:29
5.	"The Dolls' Tea Party"	Gonson	2:17
6.	"Everything Is One Big Christmas Tree"	Merritt	2:24
7.	"Walk a Lonely Road"	Merritt & Simms	3:04
8.	"Always Already Gone"	Simms	2:40
9.	"Seduced and Abandoned"	Merritt	2:21
10.	"Better Things"	Merritt	2:31
11.	"Painted Flower"	Simms	2:11
12.	"The Dada Polka"	Merritt, Simms & Gonson	2:21
13.	"From a Sinking Boat"	Merritt	3:26
Total length:			33:17

== Personnel ==
The Magnetic Fields

- Stephin Merritt – vocals, instrumentation
- Claudia Gonson – vocals, piano, tablas, cajon, leaves
- Sam Davol – cello
- John Woo – banjo, cuatro, sitar
- Shirley Simms – vocals, violin

Additional personnel

- Johny Blood – flugelhorn, tuba, vocals
- Daniel Handler – accordion, vocals
- Ida Pearle – violin
