= 50 Song Memoir =

Studio album by The Magnetic Fields
- Released: March 10, 2017
- Genre: Indie pop
- Length: 150:51
- Label: Nonesuch
- Producers: Stephin Merritt; Thomas Bartlett; Charles Newman

The Magnetic Fields chronology
Love at the Bottom of the Sea (2012)	50 Song Memoir (2017)	Quickies (2020)

Singles from 50 Song Memoir
- 1. "'81: How To Play The Synthesizer" Released: 2017; 2. "'83: Foxx And I" Released: 2017

50 Song Memoir is the eleventh studio album by American indie pop band the Magnetic Fields, released on March 10, 2017. 50 Song Memoir is an autobiographical concept album that chronicles the first 50 years of lyricist Stephin Merritt's life, with one song for each year that he has lived.

== Recording ==
The album was produced by Merritt with additional production by Thomas Bartlett and Charles Newman. Merritt sings on all fifty tracks.

== Tour ==
The fully staged live shows in support of 50 Song Memoir were directed by José Zayas with an expanded Magnetic Fields lineup that included three additional musicians for the tour for a total of seven musicians, each playing a different instrument. On the tour the band played the entirety of 50 Song Memoir in two halves across two nights at each venue.

== Release ==
50 Song Memoir is available in five-L.P. and five-C.D. editions that include an interview by Daniel Handler and facsimile handwritten lyrics by Stephin Merritt, and as a bound book.

== Reception ==
Professional ratings
Aggregate scores
Source	Rating
AnyDecentMusic?	8.2/10
Metacritic	86/100
Review scores
Source	Rating
AllMusic	4/5 stars
The A.V. Club	A−
The Guardian	4/5 stars
The Independent	5/5 stars
Mojo	4/5 stars
The Observer	4/5 stars
Pitchfork	7.4/10
Q	4/5 stars
Uncut	9/10
Vice	A−

Upon release, the album received near universal acclaim, with the average critical score being an 86 out of 100 according to review aggregator website Metacritic.

=== Accolades ===
Publication	Accolade	Year	Rank	Ref.
The Independent	The 20 Most Underrated Albums Ever	2024	7	
Uncut	Albums of the Year	2017	67	

== Track listing ==
All tracks are written by Stephin Merritt.

Disc one
No.	Title	Length
1.	"'66 Wonder Where I'm From"	2:44
2.	"'67 Come Back as a Cockroach"	2:34
3.	"'68 A Cat Called Dionysus"	2:46
4.	"'69 Judy Garland"	3:17
5.	"'70 They're Killing Children Over There"	2:36
6.	"'71 I Think I'll Make Another World"	2:57
7.	"'72 Eye Contact"	2:55
8.	"'73 It Could Have Been Paradise"	3:07
9.	"'74 No"	2:57
10.	"'75 My Mama Ain't"	3:01
Total length:		28:54

Disc two
No.	Title	Length
1.	"'76 Hustle 76"	3:16
2.	"'77 Life Ain't All Bad"	4:16
3.	"'78 The Blizzard of ’78"	3:15
4.	"'79 Rock'n'Roll Will Ruin Your Life"	2:58
5.	"'80 London by Jetpack"	2:58
6.	"'81 How to Play the Synthesizer"	3:06
7.	"'82 Happy Beeping"	3:10
8.	"'83 Foxx and I"	2:43
9.	"'84 Danceteria!"	3:09
10.	"'85 Why I Am Not a Teenager"	3:07
Total length:		31:48

Disc three
No.	Title	Length
1.	"'86 How I Failed Ethics"	2:58
2.	"'87 At the Pyramid"	3:10
3.	"'88 Ethan Frome"	2:24
4.	"'89 The 1989 Musical Marching Zoo"	3:06
5.	"'90 Dreaming in Tetris"	3:21
6.	"'91 The Day I Finally..."	2:20
7.	"'92 Weird Diseases"	3:10
8.	"'93 Me and Fred and Dave and Ted"	3:08
9.	"'94 Haven't Got a Penny"	2:53
10.	"'95 A Serious Mistake"	3:13
Total length:		29:43

Disc four
No.	Title	Length
1.	"'96 I'm Sad!"	2:12
2.	"'97 Eurodisco Trio"	3:15
3.	"'98 Lovers' Lies"	3:06
4.	"'99 Fathers in the Clouds"	2:52
5.	"'00 Ghosts of the Marathon Dancers"	3:05
6.	"'01 Have You Seen It in the Snow?"	2:51
7.	"'02 Be True to Your Bar"	3:34
8.	"'03 The Ex and I"	2:59
9.	"'04 Cold-Blooded Man"	3:06
10.	"'05 Never Again"	3:19
Total length:		30:19

Disc five
No.	Title	Length
1.	"'06 "Quotes""	2:17
2.	"'07 In the Snow White Cottages"	2:52
3.	"'08 Surfin'"	2:47
4.	"'09 Till You Come Back to Me"	2:29
5.	"'10 20,000 Leagues Under the Sea"	3:03
6.	"'11 Stupid Tears"	2:45
7.	"'12 You Can Never Go Back to New York"	3:12
8.	"'13 Big Enough for Both of Us"	3:04
9.	"'14 I Wish I Had Pictures"	3:07
10.	"'15 Somebody's Fetish"	3:45
Total length:		29:21

== Personnel ==
The Magnetic Fields

- Stephin Merritt – lead vocals, Roland vocoder, ukulele, resonator ukulele, bass ukulele, 8-string ukulele, classical guitar, 12-string guitar, electric guitar, baritone guitar, electric bass, acoustic bass, mandola, autoharp, marxolin, bass banjo, charango, cavaquinho, harp, hammered dulcimer, bowed psaltery, electric sitar, Prophet-5, ARP String Ensemble, Moog Voyager, Casio VL-Tone, piano, keyboards, Wurlitzer electric piano, Rhodes Piano Bass, organ, pianet, celeste, toy piano, prepared piano, Omnichord, audio pattern generator, kazoo, melodica, xylophone, glockenspiel, bass drum, log drum, slit drum, ocean drum, cymbal, tubes, rainstick, wind chimes, chimes, maracas, conga, bongos, triangle, tambourine, washboard, steel drum, shakers, finger cymbals, guiro, djembe, cajon, woodblock, bells, sleighbells, fingersnaps, thunder sheet, cabasas, cowbells, tongs, bottle, abacus, drum machines, tapes, feedback
- Claudia Gonson – background vocals, piano
- Sam Davol – cello, musical saw
- John Woo – guitar
- Shirley Simms – background vocals

Additional personnel

- Thomas Bartlett – mellotron, clavinet, omnichord, rhodes, piano, Moog synthesizer, optigan
- Christopher Ewen – synthesizers, kazoo, angklung, stylophone, omnichord
- Pinky Weitzman – viola, Stroh violin, musical saw
- Daniel Handler – background vocals, accordion, vibraphone, piano, Hammond organ, celeste
- Johny Blood – tuba, flugelhorn, mouthpiece
- Brad Gordon – trombone, pocket trumpet
- Randy Walker – background vocals
- Anthony Kaczynski – background vocals
- Otto Handler – spoken word

== Charts ==
Chart (2017)	Peak position
Belgian Albums (Ultratop Flanders)	155
German Albums (Offizielle Top 100)	77
Portuguese Albums (AFP)	29
Scottish Albums (Official Charts)	96
