= Watch Your Mouth =

Watch Your Mouth may refer to:

- Watch Your Mouth (novel), a 2000 novel by Daniel Handler
- Watch Your Mouth (TV series), a 1978 American comedy-drama television series
- Profanity
