= The Wayward Bus (disambiguation) =

The Wayward Bus is a 1947 novel by John Steinbeck.

The Wayward Bus may also refer to:

- The Wayward Bus (film), a 1957 American film based on Steinbeck's novel
- The Wayward Bus (album), a 1992 album by American indie pop band The Magnetic Fields
