= Monorhyme =

Monorhyme is a passage, stanza, or entire poem in which all lines have the same end rhyme. The term "monorhyme" describes the use of one (mono) type of repetitious sound (rhyme). This is common in Arabic, Persian, Latin and Welsh work, such as The Book of One Thousand and One Nights, e.g., qasida and its derivative kafi.

Some styles of monorhyme use the end of a poem's line to utilize this poetic tool. The Persian ghazal poetry style places the monorhyme before the refrain in a line. This is seen in the poem "Even the Rain" by Agha Shahid Ali:

"What will suffice for a true-love knot? Even the rain?
But he has bought grief's lottery, bought even the rain."

The monorhyme knot is introduced before the line’s refrain or pause. The corresponding rhyme bought is used in the next line. Although these are not the last words of the lines in the poem, monorhyme is incorporated in identical rhyme schemes in each line.

== Examples ==
An example of monorhyme is the poem "A Monorhyme for the Shower" by Dick Davis. This monorhyme has all the ending lines rhyming with the word "hair". For demonstration purposes, the final seven lines read as follows:

All the prosaic wear and tear
That constitute the life we share
Slip from her beautiful and bare
Bright body as, made half aware
Of my quick, surreptitious stare,
She wrings the water from her hair
And turning smiles to see me there.

There is also a monorhyme sung by Willy Wonka in the 1973 film Willy Wonka and the Chocolate Factory, during the dark tunnel scene, with all lines ending with words rhyming with "owing".

The song "I'm Going Out of My Mind Trying to Get Into Yours" by British post punk band Half Man Half Biscuit has a double monorhyme, with each line ending with a rhyme for "yours" and an internal rhyme for "mind". The song's opening verse goes:

Life's a bind, there's always a clause
The daily grind continually gnaws
When you declined to pick up the oars
I've got assigned to desolate shores
So I'm resigned to curse my flaws
Though you're not so unkind as to lock all the doors
I need to find emergency stores
I'm going out of my mind trying to get into yours

== See also ==
- Perfect and imperfect rhymes
- "Every Breath You Take"
- "Andrew in Drag"

== Sources ==
- Cushman, Stephen; Clare Cavanagh; Jahan Ramazani, Paul Rouzer (2012). The Princeton Encyclopedia of Poetry and Poetics (4th ed.). Princeton University Press. pp. 898–899. ISBN 978-1-4008-4142-4.
