= Lonely Robot =

Lonely Robot can refer to:

- Lonely Robot, a solo project by English musician John Mitchell
- The Lonely Robot, an EP by American synthpop group Future Bible Heroes
