= Lemony =

Lemony may refer to:

- Something resembling a lemon
- Lemony Snicket, an American author

- Daniel Handler (born 1970), the real name of the author
