= The Charm of the Highway Strip =

Studio album by The Magnetic Fields
- Released: April 18, 1994
- Genres: Indie pop; synth-pop; electropop
- Length: 33:15
- Label: Merge
- Producer: Stephin Merritt

The Magnetic Fields chronology
The House of Tomorrow (1992)	The Charm of the Highway Strip (1994)	Holiday (1994)

Singles from The Charm of the Highway Strip
- 1. "Long Vermont Roads" Released: 1992

Professional ratings
Review scores
Source	Rating
AllMusic	4/5 stars
NME	7/10
Pitchfork	8.2/10
Q	4/5 stars
The Rolling Stone Album Guide	3/5 stars
Spin Alternative Record Guide	8/10
The Village Voice	B+

The Charm of the Highway Strip is the third studio album by American indie pop band the Magnetic Fields, released in 1994. It was the fourth Magnetic Fields album to be recorded, but was released five months prior to their intended third album Holiday, which was delayed for more than a year due to label issues. The Charm of the Highway Strip was also the band's debut release on Merge Records.

== Content ==
Its title, lyrics and musical styling are a nod to country music, though the songs of Stephin Merritt remain rooted in classic pop and synthesizers. Virtually every song deals with roads and travel, and several songs' lyrics implicitly reference vampires.

The title of the album comes from a quote by J. B. Jackson, 1959: "Let us hope that the merits and charm of the highway strip are not so obscure but that they will be accepted by a wider public."

This is the group's first full album in which songwriter Merritt also takes lead vocals. He designed the record's cover art, and has stated it is the album of his he is most satisfied with thus far in his career.

The track "Crowd of Drifters" initially appeared in 1990, with vocals by former lead vocalist Susan Anway, on the compilation album The Marvels Of Insect Life - D.D.V.IV (Doctor Death's Volume IV) released by Baker, Louisiana based alternative music label C'est La Morte.

== Legacy ==
Arcade Fire covered "Born on a Train" during a live performance on the KCRW program Morning Becomes Eclectic. Lush covered "I Have the Moon" as a B-side on their 1996 single "500 (Shake Baby Shake)". The song was also included on the B-sides collection Topolino and on the Chorus box set.

Indie singer-songwriter Samia also released a cover of "Born on a Train."

The song "Dust Bowl" was used during an episode of the television series version of This American Life ("Pandora's Box").

Indie rock band Country Westerns included a cover of "Two Characters in Search of a Country Song" as the final track on their self-titled debut album.

== Track listing ==
All songs written by Stephin Merritt.

The Charm of the Highway Strip track listing
No.	Title	Length
1.	"Lonely Highway"	3:06
2.	"Long Vermont Roads"	3:27
3.	"Born on a Train"	3:46
4.	"I Have the Moon"	2:37
5.	"Two Characters in Search of a Country Song"	3:33
6.	"Crowd of Drifters"	3:36
7.	"Fear of Trains"	3:15
8.	"When the Open Road Is Closing In"	3:39
9.	"Sunset City"	4:05
10.	"Dust Bowl"	2:20

== Personnel ==
The Magnetic Fields

- Stephin Merritt – vocals, instrumentation
- Claudia Gonson – management
- Sam Davol – cello
