= Partygoing =

Studio album by Future Bible Heroes
- Released: June 4, 2013
- Studio: Polar Mother (Boston, Massachusetts); Mother West (New York, New York)
- Genre: Synth-pop; electropop
- Length: 34:11
- Label: Merge

Future Bible Heroes chronology
Eternal Youth (2002)	Partygoing (2013)

Professional ratings
Aggregate scores
Source	Rating
AnyDecentMusic?	6.6/10
Metacritic	74/100
Review scores
Source	Rating
AllMusic	4/5 stars
The A.V. Club	B+
Consequence of Sound	3.5/5 stars
Pitchfork	6.3/10
PopMatters	7/10
Rolling Stone	2.5/5 stars
Spin	7/10
Uncut	7/10

Partygoing is the third studio album by American indie pop band Future Bible Heroes. Future Bible Heroes member and lead lyricist Stephin Merritt was inspired by the 1981 B-52's album Party Mix! to create Partygoing, conceived as "a party album that only just happens to be largely about drunk suicide, aging, death, loss, and despair."

== Track listing ==
All songs written by Stephin Merritt and Christopher Ewen.

1. "A Drink Is Just the Thing" – 1:26
2. "Sadder Than the Moon" – 3:44
3. "Let's Go to Sleep (And Never Come Back)" – 2:48
4. "Satan, Your Way Is a Hard One" – 2:30
5. "A New Kind of Town" – 1:47
6. "All I Care About Is You" – 3:22
7. "Living, Loving, Partygoing" – 3:22
8. "Keep Your Children in a Coma" – 2:19
9. "How Very Strange" – 2:47
10. "Love Is a Luxury I Can No Longer Afford" – 2:19
11. "Digging My Own Grave" – 3:05
12. "Drink Nothing But Champagne" – 2:06
13. "When Evening Falls on Tinseltown" – 2:36

== Personnel ==
Credits adapted from AllMusic.

Future Bible Heroes

- Christopher Ewen – composition, engineering, instrumentation
- Claudia Gonson – vocals
- Stephin Merritt – composition, instrumentation, mixing, vocals

Additional personnel

- Michael English – design
- Jeff Lipton – mastering
- Charles Newman – engineer, mixing
- Maria Rice – assistant mastering engineer
