= The House of Tomorrow (album) =

EP by The Magnetic Fields
- Released: 1992 (7" vinyl); April 23, 1996 (CD reissue)
- Length: 12:21
- Label: Harriet Records; Feel Good All Over; Merge Records (reissue); MRG152
- Producer: Stephin Merritt

The Magnetic Fields chronology
The Wayward Bus (1992)	The House of Tomorrow (1992)	The Charm of the Highway Strip (1994)

Professional ratings
Review scores
Source	Rating
AllMusic	3/5 stars
Pitchfork Media	(7.4/10)

The House of Tomorrow EP is the third major release by The Magnetic Fields, and the first with Stephin Merritt as the main vocalist. Merge Records reissued it in 1996. The EP's five songs are built on both musical and vocal repetition, so much so that the sleeve reads "five loop songs" as a pun on "five love songs". The cover depicts the St. Louis World's Fair (1904)

== Track listing ==
All tracks are written by Stephen Merritt.

No.	Title	Length
1.	"Young and Insane"	2:30
2.	"Technical (You're So)"	2:34
3.	"Alien Being" (Excluded in the original 1992 7" vinyl release)	2:32
4.	"Love Goes Home to Paris in the Spring"	2:25
5.	"Either You Don't Love Me or I Don't Love You"	2:20
Total length:		12:21

== Personnel ==
- Stephin Merritt – guitar and vocals
- Claudia Gonson – drums and vocals
- Sam Davol – cello

Additional personnel

- Phylene Amuso – bass guitar
- Nell Beram – guitar
