= Memories of Love =

Studio album by Future Bible Heroes
- Released: 1997
- Genres: Indie rock; synth-pop
- Length: 42:03
- Labels: Slow River/Rykodisc (US); Elefant (Europe, Korea); Setanta (UK)

Future Bible Heroes chronology
Memories of Love (1997)	Eternal Youth (2002)

Singles from Memories of Love
- 1. "Lonely Days" Released: 1998

Memories of Love is the debut studio album by the American band Future Bible Heroes, released in 1997. Its accompanying booklet features twelve word puzzles and games that, if solved correctly, reveal the name of the band and the title of the album, plus the lyrics to each of the album's eleven songs.

== Critical reception ==
Professional ratings
Review scores
Source	Rating
AllMusic	4.5/5 stars
Chicago Tribune	3/4 stars
Christgau's Consumer Guide	(neither)
Entertainment Weekly	B+
Pitchfork	7.4/10
(The New) Rolling Stone Album Guide	3/5 stars

The Hartford Courant wrote that frontman Stephin Merritt is "entranced with regret—lost loves, lost summers, lost youth—but such a pessimistic romantic that the loveless sigh of agony is as appealing as the lover's sigh of ecstasy." Salon critic Doug Wolk observed that "music and instrumentation [is] in full-on 1987 nouveau-wavo synth-pop style — we're talking Paul Hardcastle, Bronski Beat, 'If You Leave'-era OMD. It's pure Romy and Michele's High School Reunion music, and if you can deal with that, you'll love it."

== Track listing ==
All lyrics are written by Stephin Merritt; all music is composed by Stephin Merritt (vocal melodies) and Christopher Ewen (music and instrumentation).

No.	Title	Length
1.	"Lonely Days"	4:10
2.	"She-Devils of the Deep"	4:01
3.	"Hopeless"	3:38
4.	"Death Opened a Boutique"	3:49
5.	"You Pretend to Be the Moon"	4:08
6.	"Blond Adonis"	4:49
7.	"But You're So Beautiful"	4:13
8.	"A You You Never Knew"	2:14
9.	"Real Summer"	3:50
10.	"Memories of Love"	3:27
11.	"You Steal the Scene"	3:45

== Personnel ==
- Stephin Merritt – vocals
- Claudia Gonson – vocals
- Christopher Ewen – instrumentation
