= Obscurities =

Obscurities may refer to:

- Obscurities (Stephin Merritt album), 2011
- Wives and Obscurities, a 1956 comedy film

== See also ==
- Obscurity (disambiguation)
