= 100,000 Fireflies =

Single by The Magnetic Fields

from the album Distant Plastic Trees
- B-side: "Old Orchard Beach"
- Released: September 1991
- Genre: Twee pop, indie pop
- Length: 3:20
- Label: Harriet Records
- Songwriter(s): Stephin Merritt
- Producer(s): Stephin Merritt

The Magnetic Fields singles chronology
"100,000 Fireflies" (1991)	"Long Vermont Roads" (1993)

"100,000 Fireflies" is the first single by the American indie pop band The Magnetic Fields, taken from their first studio album Distant Plastic Trees, released in 1991. It is known for its bleak, tongue-in-cheek lyrics and black humor and for Susan Anway's sparse, soprano vocal performance. The song saw play on alternative and college radio stations on its release and slowly grew into a cult classic, becoming "the ultimate staple" of indie mixtape culture during the 1990s. Ryan H. Walsh described the song as mysterious and contradictory, with the sparse arrangement giving it an intimate feeling.

Because of its re-release in 1995 as part of the 2 for 1 Distant Plastic Trees/The Wayward Bus album, Glide magazine named it the second best modern rock song of the previous decade in 2004.

Music critic Tom Ewing ranked the song at number 11 in his list of the "Top 100 Singles of the 90s", and said that, "for '100,000 Fireflies' everything is trebly and close, the drum reduced to a stern background thud and the song almost completely driven by the cycling, calliope-tinted keyboards and Amway’s cut-glass singing. Like the song and the situation it describes, the result is a perfect mix of intimacy with claustrophobia."
