= Obscurities (Stephin Merritt album) =

Compilation album by Stephin Merritt
- Released: August 23, 2011
- Genre: Indie pop
- Length: 38:12
- Label: Merge Records

Stephin Merritt chronology
Showtunes (2006)	Obscurities (2011)

Obscurities is a compilation album by Stephin Merritt, released in 2011 on Merge Records. It consists of B-sides, compilations cuts, and various other previously unreleased material.

== Reception ==
Professional ratings
Aggregate scores
Source	Rating
Metacritic	74/100
Review scores
Source	Rating
Allmusic	3/5 stars
American Songwriter	4/5 stars
The A.V. Club	B
Consequence of Sound	B
Drowned in Sound	7/10
MSN Music (Expert Witness)	A–
MusicOMH	3/5 stars
Pitchfork	7.5/10
PopMatters	7/10
Rolling Stone	4/5 stars

On Metacritic, Obscurities has a score of 74 out of 100, indicating that it has received "generally favorable reviews" from critics. Robert Christgau gave the album an A− grade and wrote that he was "swept off [his] feet by Merritt thoughtfully intoning some little green men's 'Song From Venus.'"

== Track listing ==
Information adapted from LP liner notes.

All tracks are written by Stephin Merritt, except "Beach-a-Boop-Boop," by Merritt and Shirley Simms.

No.	Title	Source	Length
1.	"Forever and a Day" (Previously Unreleased)	From The Song from Venus, an unfinished musical by Stephin Merritt and Daniel Handler
2.	"Rats in the Garbage of the Western World" (The Magnetic Fields)	B-Side of "All the Umbrellas in London" 7-inch single
3.	"I Don't Believe You" (The Magnetic Fields)	7-inch single
4.	"Plant White Roses" (Buffalo Rome)	From Cooking for the Priests K Records cassette
5.	"Rot in the Sun" (The 6ths)	B-Side of "Heaven in a Black Leather Jacket" 7-inch single
6.	"The Sun and the Sea and the Sky" (Previously Unreleased)
7.	"Yet Another Girl" (The 6ths)	From the limited edition Wasps' Nests vinyl box set
8.	"Scream ('Till You Make the Scene)" (Previously Unreleased)
9.	"The Song from Venus" (Previously Unreleased)	From The Song from Venus
10.	"Beach-a-Boop-Boop" (The Magnetic Fields)	B-Side of "Long Vermont Roads" 7-inch single
11.	"When I'm Not Looking, You're Not There" (The Magnetic Fields)	B-Side of "I Don't Believe You" 7-inch single
12.	"Take Ecstasy With Me" (The Magnetic Fields)	From Oh, Merge compilation
13.	"When You're Young and in Love" (Previously Unreleased)	From The Song from Venus
14.	"You Are Not My Mother and I Want to Go Home" (The Gothic Archies)	From the Neil Gaiman audiobook Coraline

== Personnel ==
Credits adapted from LP liner notes.

Musicians

- Stephin Merritt
- Shirley Simms – voice (4), guitar (4)
- Stuart Moxham – voice (7)
- Claudia Gonson – drums (7, 10), background vocals (13)
- Susan Anway – voice (12)

Technical

- Charles Newman – engineer (1, 9, 13)
- Tom Rogers – archival engineering
- Jeff Lipton – mastering
- Gail O'Hara – photographress
- Michael Fusco – design
