= Adverbs (novel) =

Novel by Daniel Handler

- First edition cover
- Author: Daniel Handler
- Language: English
- Genre: Novel
- Publisher: Ecco
- Publication date: 5 June 2006
- Publication place: United States
- Media type: Print (hardback)
- Pages: 272 pp (first edition, hardback)
- ISBN: 0-06-072441-2 (first edition, hardback)
- OCLC: 61362193
- Dewey Decimal: 813/.54 22
- LC Class: PS3558.A4636 A66 2006

Adverbs is a 2006 novel by Daniel Handler. It is formatted as a collection of seventeen interconnected narratives from the points of view of different people in various sorts of love. Each of the titles is an adverb suggesting what sort of love the people are dealing with. Some people are "wrongly" in love, others are "briefly" in love, and so on. The book focuses on the ways that people fall in love, instead of focusing on whom they are in love with.

== Structure ==
Adverbs is billed as a novel, but is commonly described by critics and journalists as a collection of short stories. Certainly it breaks some of the traditional conventions of the novel genre. The narrative is driven by half-truths and intentionally misleading statements. The point of view shifts from story to story, characters reappear in unlikely settings, multiple characters have the same name, and Handler himself frequently makes an appearance, not in the role of the narrator, but apparently as the author himself.

While the narratives interlock, they are not sequential; and not all characters who share the same name are in fact the same character - even though they may also share certain similar aspects of personality or physical features. The narrator admits as much: "At the end of the novel, it's Joe who's in the taxi, falling in love with Andrea, although it might not be Andrea, or in any case it might not be the same Andrea, as Andrea is a very common name." Handler re-uses several names for major characters from earlier works, primarily Watch Your Mouth, including Joe, Steven, and Allison. However, none of the re-used names appear to be the same characters from Handler's earlier work.

== Plot summary ==
In "Immediately", a man leaves his girlfriend (Andrea) and falls in love with his homophobic cabdriver.

In "Obviously", a teenager (Joe) working at a multiplex takes tickets for Kickass: The Movie while pining for the teenage girl (Lila) working the shift with him. She has a boyfriend (Keith). Joe mentions a friend, Garth, who travels to San Francisco to meet with his girlfriend, Kate. This Kate is Kate Gordon, one of Flannery's friends in The Basic Eight, who is mentioned having a brief relationship with a guy named Garth in that novel.

In "Arguably", a British writer (Helena), who is married to a man (David) whose ex is called "Andrea", needs money.

In "Particularly", Helena works for Andrea, whom she is jealous of.

In "Briefly", a teenager's crush on his sister's boyfriend (Keith) haunts him throughout life.

In "Soundly", a woman (Allison)—who has an ex named "Adam"—spends an evening out with her best friend (Lila), who's dying of a rare disease, and they both focus on what their friendship means, particularly compared to their relationships with men. They reminisce about their friend "Andrea" and an encounter with a boy named "Joe". "Allison" and "Lila" both crop up again as character names repeatedly throughout the book. Handler is sometimes clear about whether he's speaking about the same people, and sometimes not. As in most of the chapters, Handler here provides one possible definition of love: "[t]his is love, to sit with someone you've known forever in a place you've been meaning to go, and watching as their life happens to them until you stand up and it's time to go. You don't care about yours. Why should it change, the love you feel, no matter how death goes?". After a conversation with a woman named Gladys, who is able to make items appear out of thin air, Lila gets a call to come to the hospital for a transplant, but there is a problem with the ferry; some kind of disaster has occurred which means they cannot cross to the hospital. The guy working at the booth is called 'Tomas'.

In "Frigidly", a pair of detectives comes looking for the Snow Queen (Gladys) in a diner where Andrea is drinking at the counter. A boy (Mike), who had been a student of Helena, is waiting.

"Collectively" is about a man who has a series of random people, including a mail carrier and his son (Mike), coming to his house to declare how much they love him. "Isn't love a sharing?", asks the narrator, trying to explain the postman's (and everyone else's) strange longing for the house owner. The story concludes with the man sharing accepting the affection of his guests by sharing a smoothie with them.

In "Symbolically", an aspiring writer (Tomas) hooks up with a man (Adam) who has come to film a potential catastrophe. The next day, the man returns with his girlfriend (Eddie).

In "Clearly", a young couple (Adam and Eddie) sneaks away into the woods for some risqué outdoor sex. After they have undressed, an apologetic hiker (Tomas) interrupts them with news of an injured friend (Steven). The couple attend to the hiker's needs, leaving their own hanging.

The female character (Eddie) in "Naturally" dates a man who turns out to be a ghost. When she discovers this, she ends their union. Her ex is called 'Joe'.

"Wrongly" features a graduate student (Allison) inexplicably drawn to a colleague (Steven) who's already treated her badly.

In "Truly", Daniel Handler explains the game Adverbs: "Someone is It and leaves the room and everyone else decides on an adverb. It returns and forces people to act out things in the manner of the word, which is another name for the game. People argue violently, or make coffee quickly, and there's always a time when the alcohol takes over and people suggest hornily and we all must watch as It makes two people writhe on the floor, supposedly dancing or eating or driving a car, until finally It guesses the adverb everyone's thinking of. It's a charade, although it's not much like Charades. You play until you get bored." Handler's explanation of Adverbs leads to a discussion of the identity of characters across chapters: "Nobody keeps score, because there's no sense in keeping track of what everyone is doing. You might as well trace birds through a book, or follow a total stranger you spot outside the window of your cab, or follow the cocktails spilling themselves from the pages of vintage cocktail encyclopedias to leave stains through this book, or follow the pop songs that stick in people's heads or follow the people themselves, although you're likely to confuse them, as so many people in this book have the same names. You can't follow all the Joes, or all the Davids and Andreas. You can't follow Adam or Allison or Keith, up to Seattle or down to San Francisco or across—three thousand miles, as the bird flies—to New York City, and anyway they don't matter."

In "Not Particularly", Helena awaits the return of her husband, David. She thinks he's cheating on her, because he's left his passport behind, but she doesn't realize that (at that time) he doesn't need a passport to travel to Canada. Helena meets Joe and gets a letter addressed to Andrea.

In "Often", Allison is married to a comic writer and goes on a cruise for comic writers. She meets Keith.

In "Barely", Sam moves out after her roommate (Andrea) gets involved with Steven. The boy across the street is Mike.

In the last story, "Judgmentally", Joe avoids jury duty and meets Andrea, who is driving a cab.

== Reviews ==
Tasha Robinson, writing for The A.V. Club in 2006, wrote that the book "deepens as it goes along, turning into something richer and more complicated than it seems at first blush. As characters, objects, and symbols, vault across plotlines to repeatedly re-emerge, and successive stories not only become stronger and better realized, but reflect back on previous chapters, the book takes on a keener, smarter edge. It's like watching a film come into focus."

Lucy Ellmann, writing for The Guardian, reviewed the book poorly: "The cute faux awkwardness, the pedantry proposed as mateyness, the tricksy reminders of the narrator's role, combined with ominous stories of young women going into the woods alone or getting into cars with strangers, and the requisite allusions to 9/11, all connive at seeming cool, timely, significant, memorable: teenage stuff."

Publishers Weekly gave Adverbs a starred review, praising its "linguistic pyrotechnics" and "blithe poignancy."
