= Gio Black Peter =

American artist

- Born: 1979 (age 46–47); Guatemala
- Occupations: Artist, actor

Gio Black Peter, born Giovanni Paolo Andrade Guevara in Guatemala in 1979, is a New York City-based actor, musical performer, and visual artist. As a visual artist, Gio Black Peter is known for his figurative and provocative paintings. His work was exhibited at the 30th International Festival of Fashion and Photography in Hyères, Galerie L'axolotl in Toulon, France, Galerei S.E. in Bergen, Norway, the Munch Gallery, and Casa de Costa in New York City.

As an actor he is known for his role in the films Eban and Charley (2000) and Otto; or Up with Dead People (2008). His musical and performance art is part of the New York underground and is often a collaboration with the multi-media team SUPERM.
