= Kid Montana =

Belgian band

- Origin: Brussels, Belgium
- Genres: New wave, synthpop
- Years active: 1981–1987
- Labels: New Dance, Antler, Les Disques du Crépuscule, LTM
- Members: Dudley Kludt; Jean-Marc Lederman

Kid Montana was a Belgian electropop band that was active from 1981 to 1987.

Kid Montana began in 1981 as an alias for Belgian musician Jean-Marc Lederman. Throughout that year, Lederman recorded tracks with various contributors which were published on compilations under the Kid Montana name. These recordings were collected on the EP Statistics Mean Nothing When You Get On The Wrong Plane, released in 1982.

In mid-1983 American singer Dudley Klute joined Kid Montana. Klute and Lederman released Revisiting Yalta, a 12" EP, in November 1983. The single Love May Be Blind and mini album The Las Vegas Gold Rush came out on Belgian label Les Disques du Crépuscule in October and December 1985 respectively.

The group released their only full-length album, Temperamental, in 1987. Singles from Temperamental got some radio airplay, but failed to achieve commercial success; Kid Montana split amicably in 1987.

Les Disques du Crépuscule re-issued Temperamental on CD in 1990 with bonus tracks. The album, along with the compiled EPs, were remastered and reissued as a 2-CD collection in August 2008 by LTM Recordings.

== Discography ==
- Statistics Mean Nothing When You Get On The Wrong Plane (1982)
- Revisiting Yalta (1983)
- Love May Be Blind (1985)
- The Las Vegas Gold Rush (1985)
- Spooky / Love and Trouble (featuring Anna Domino)
- Temperamental (1986)
- Still Color Waiting / Spooky (1987)
- Temperamental + singles (Kid Montana compilation) (2008)
- INDY KMBL (2010)
