= Obscure =

Obscure may refer to:

- Heraclitus of Ephesus was called "The Obscure"
- Obscure (video game), a 2004 survival horror game
- Obscure (band), a Bangladeshi pop rock band
- Obscure Records, a 1975–1978 UK label founded by Brian Eno
- "Obscure", a song by Dir en grey from Vulgar

== See also ==
- Obscure vowel, a type of weak or reduced vowel sound
- Obscurity (disambiguation)
- Obscure means unknown or strange
