= The Basic Eight =

1999 novel by Daniel Handler

- Author: Daniel Handler
- Language: English
- Genre: Fiction, satire, black comedy
- Publisher: Thomas Dunne Books
- Publication date: April 1999
- Publication place: United States
- Pages: 329 (1st edition)
- ISBN: 0-312-19833-7 (1st edition)
- OCLC: 39756403

The Basic Eight is the debut novel by author Daniel Handler, published in 1999. The book is a version of the diary of high-schooler Flannery Culp. It contains a number of sarcastic plot devices that ridicule high school English classes, standardized testing, satanic panic and talk show analysts. The book is a classic example of one with an unreliable narrator. Consistent with Handler's farcical treatment of high school English, he includes vocabulary words and study questions at the end of some of Culp's diary entries.

== Plot ==
Flannery "Flan" Culp is a senior at Roewer High School in San Francisco. Over the course of the year, Flan records the events of her life in a diary—which, with some heavy editing by Flannery herself years after the fact, becomes the narrative. She and her seven close friends refer to themselves as "The Basic Eight". They are an exclusive clique, hosting the Grand Opera Breakfast Club, and regular dinner and garden parties. The story chronicles Flannery and her friends as they cope with the stresses of their final year of high school and Flannery's complicated love life. The story reaches a dark conclusion in which lives of the members of the Basic Eight are turned upside down by revealed secrets, horrifying self-discoveries, and murder.

== Characters ==
The Basic Eight consists of:

- Flannery Culp, the protagonist
- Kate Gordon, the Queen Bee
- Lily Chandly, a classical musician
- Douglas Wilde, Flan's ex-boyfriend
- V__, whose rich parents have had her name expunged from the story
- Jennifer Rose Milton, a name so beautiful that Flan must always write it out in full
- Gabriel Gallon, the kindest boy in the world
- Natasha Hyatt, Flan's exuberant and beautiful best friend

Additional characters include:

- Adam State, the object of Flannery's affections
- Ron Piper, the high school drama club director
- Steve Nervo, the most popular boy in school

== Connections ==
In Handler's third novel, Adverbs, Kate is mentioned as the girlfriend of a minor character, Garth, in the chapter "Soundly". In The Basic Eight, Kate frequently gives relationship advice from her two-week relationship with Garth, much to Flannery's annoyance.

In the A Series of Unfortunate Events video game for the Game Boy Advance, an item needed in several quests is "The Basic Nine by Danny Handy".

== Publication history ==
The Basic Eight was the first novel published by author Daniel Handler. He has stated in several interviews that it was very difficult for him to get the novel published. It was rejected 37 times before publication by Thomas Dunne Books. His pen name, Lemony Snicket, was created while he was researching for The Basic Eight and needed a fake name within which to sign up for organizations' mailing lists.

== Reception ==
The New Yorker featured the novel in its First Novels section, writing: "This shrewdly funny novel is the diary of Flannery Culp, the alleged ringleader of eight high-school seniors who are accused of ritualistic murder, and instantly become the patients of countless armchair therapists and favorites with the What's Wrong with Our Youth crowd. Handler is a charming writer with a lovely mastery of voice, but the book is weakened by his attempt to turn a clever idea into social satire".
