= Eternal Youth (Future Bible Heroes album) =

Studio album by Future Bible Heroes
- Released: August 2002
- Recorded: 2002
- Genres: Synthpop, electropop
- Length: 39:14
- Label: Instinct

Future Bible Heroes chronology
Memories of Love (1997)	Eternal Youth (2002)	Partygoing (2013)

Singles from Eternal Youth
- 1. "The World Is a Disco Ball" Released: 2003

Professional ratings
Aggregate scores
Source	Rating
Metacritic	67/100
Review scores
Source	Rating
AllMusic	4.5/5 stars
Blender	3/5 stars
Neumu	8/10
Pitchfork	5.5/10
Uncut	4/5 stars

Eternal Youth is the second studio album by American indie pop band Future Bible Heroes. It was released in 2002 on Instinct Records. The album was sung entirely by band member Claudia Gonson.

== Track listing ==
All songs written by Stephin Merritt and Christopher Ewen.

1. "Losing Your Affection" – 4:50
2. "The Slow Fade" – 0:52
3. "Doris Daytheearthstoodstill" – 4:07
4. "A Thousand Lovers in a Day" – 2:58
5. "Bathysphere" – 0:49
6. "I'm a Vampire" – 3:23
7. "From Some Dying Star" – 3:16
8. "Viennese Lift" – 0:42
9. "Smash the Beauty Machine" – 3:12
10. "The Control Room" – 0:39
11. "Find an Open Window" – 3:17
12. "Kiss Me Only with Your Eyes" – 3:51
13. "Jakarta" – 0:47
14. "No River" – 3:29
15. "Cartoon" – 0:21
16. "The World Is a Disco Ball" – 2:41

== Personnel ==
Future Bible Heroes

- Claudia Gonson – vocals
- Stephin Merritt – lyrics
- Christopher Ewen – instrumentation
