= We Are Pirates =

2015 novel by Daniel Handler

- First edition
- Author: Daniel Handler
- Language: English
- Genre: Fiction
- Published: 2015
- Publisher: Bloomsbury Publishing
- Publication place: United States
- Pages: 269 pp

We Are Pirates is a 2015 American novel written by Daniel Handler.

== Plot ==
Gwen, a young teen, puts together a ship's crew and heads out to sea to be 21st-century pirates violently terrorizing the San Francisco Bay.
