= I (The Magnetic Fields album) =

i

Studio album by The Magnetic Fields
- Released: May 4, 2004
- Genre: Indie pop
- Length: 41:19
- Label: Nonesuch
- Producer: Stephin Merritt

The Magnetic Fields chronology
69 Love Songs (1999)	i (2004)	Distortion (2008)

Singles from i
- 1. "I Thought You Were My Boyfriend" Released: 2004

i is the seventh studio album by American indie pop band the Magnetic Fields. It was released on May 4, 2004, by record label Nonesuch. The songs of the album all start with the letter "i" and are all sung by Stephin Merritt. The songs are also in alphabetical order.

== Musical style ==
The album ditches many of Stephin Merritt's past synthpop and electropop influences, largely being led by guitars and strings. It was followed in 2008, by Distortion, and in 2010, by Realism, which were both also free of synthesizer instrumentation, forming the so-called "no-synth trilogy".

== Album cover ==
The cover art, designed by Evan Gaffney, is based on Gravity in Four Directions by Fred Tomaselli.

== Reception ==
Professional ratings
Aggregate scores
Source	Rating
Metacritic	79/100
Review scores
Source	Rating
AllMusic	3.5/5 stars
Blender	4/5 stars
Entertainment Weekly	B
The Guardian	4/5 stars
Mojo	4/5 stars
Pitchfork	7.7/10
Q	4/5 stars
Rolling Stone	3/5 stars
Spin	B+
The Village Voice	B+

i has been well-received by critics. It currently holds a score of 79/100 on review aggregator website Metacritic. A track-by-track tribute to the album, entitled ¡AYE!, was released by Jackson & the Wargonauts in 2014.

== Track listing ==
All tracks are written by Stephin Merritt.

No.	Title	Length
1.	"I Die"	2:14
2.	"I Don't Believe You"	3:40
3.	"I Don't Really Love You Anymore"	2:33
4.	"I Looked All Over Town"	2:39
5.	"I Thought You Were My Boyfriend"	4:24
6.	"I Was Born"	2:01
7.	"I Wish I Had an Evil Twin"	3:16
8.	"If There's Such a Thing as Love"	2:57
9.	"I'm Tongue-Tied"	2:49
10.	"In an Operetta"	2:02
11.	"Infinitely Late at Night"	2:45
12.	"Irma"	2:23
13.	"Is This What They Used to Call Love?"	3:04
14.	"It's Only Time"	4:25

== Personnel ==
The Magnetic Fields

- Stephin Merritt – vocals, instrumentation, production
- Claudia Gonson – drums and percussion, piano, harpsichord, background vocals, arrangement on "In an Operetta"
- Sam Davol – cello
- John Woo – banjo, guitar, electric sitar

Technical

- Charles Newman – recording
- Ravi Krishnaswami – recording
- Charles Newman – additional production, mixing
- Jeff Lipton – mastering
- Vincent Giangola – additional editing on "I Don't Believe You"
- David Merrill – recording on "In an Operetta"
