= Obscurity =

Obscurity may refer to:

- Security through obscurity, a controversial principle in security engineering which attempts to use secrecy to provide security
- Obscurity (band), a German extreme metal band

== See also ==
- Obscurantism
- Obscure (disambiguation)
- Obscurities (disambiguation)
