= Why We Broke Up =

2011 novel by Daniel Handler

- Author: Daniel Handler
- Illustrator: Maira Kalman
- Language: English
- Genre: Contemporary fiction, Romance, young adult fiction
- Publisher: Little, Brown and Company
- Publication date: December 2011
- Publication place: United States
- Media type: Print (Hardcover)
- Pages: 368
- ISBN: 978-0-316-12725-7

Why We Broke Up is a novel written by Daniel Handler and illustrated by artist and designer Maira Kalman. It received a Michael L. Printz Honor and a feature film starring Hailee Steinfeld was in the works, and was meant to be released in early 2014.

== Plot summary ==
Min Green and Ed Slaterton, a high school junior and senior basketball jock, respectively, ended their relationship, which lasted from October 5 to November 12. The story takes the form of a letter, with Min writing to Ed explaining why they had broken up. The letter accompanies a box full of minor objects that narrates the progress of their relationship, and is returned to Ed at the end of the letter. The box includes two bottle caps, a movie ticket, a lobby ticket, a box of matches, a pinhole camera, a folded note, a rubber band, a high school pennant, a toy truck, a recipe book (Real Recipes from Tinseltown), Pensieri, a fictional liquor (and Italian for "thoughts"), a protractor, a file, a concert ticket, an egg cuber ("makes a square egg"), a polaroid, a comb from a motel room, a pair of ugly earrings, and several other items collected over the course of their relationship. Item after item is illustrated, accounted for, and placed in the box to be dumped—like an ex-girlfriend—on his front porch.

== Promotion ==
This book was promoted on Tumblr at the "Why We Broke Up Project", where people can submit their own break-up stories. Handler interviewed people at Grand Central Station in New York City about their experiences with break-ups.

== Reception ==
Monica Edinger, a fourth-grade teacher at The Dalton School, praises the book, a "silken, bittersweet tale of adolescent heartache", in The New York Times, noting his "remarkable presentation of an adolescent girl's point of view". She also describes the effect of the many "superbly" made-up films that Min references, which leads readers to "feel certain they must really exist". Brian Truitt of USA Today claims that the book should not have the "young adult" label because "writer Daniel Handler and illustrator Maira Kalman will connect with anyone who has ever had an ex. And really, that's a whole lot of us". Amy Benfer, writing for barnesandnoblereview.com, commends Maira Kalman's "sly, beautifully produced illustrations" which are found throughout the novel.
