= The Wayward Bus (album) =

Studio album by The Magnetic Fields
- Released: 1992
- Genre: Indie pop; synth-pop; symphonic pop; pop rock
- Length: 28:39
- Label: PoPuP, Merge
- Producer: Stephin Merritt

The Magnetic Fields chronology
Distant Plastic Trees (1991)	The Wayward Bus (1992)	The House of Tomorrow (1992)

Professional ratings
Review scores
Source	Rating
AllMusic	4/5 stars
Christgau's Consumer Guide	B+
Spin Alternative Record Guide	7/10

The Wayward Bus is the second studio album by American indie pop band the Magnetic Fields, released in 1992 by the band's own label, PoPuP Records.

As with the band's first release, Distant Plastic Trees, Susan Anway sings lead vocals on The Wayward Bus. The Wayward Bus is the last album featuring Anway, as she left the band to move interstate; Stephin Merritt subsequently assumed vocal duties.

Merritt composed all of the album's songs but collaborated with a number of other musicians in recording the album, and they play various acoustic instruments. The Wayward Bus is unlike Distant Plastic Trees in this regard; the earlier album was synthesiser-based, and this synthesised instrumentation was performed exclusively by Merritt.

Merritt acknowledged the influence of Phil Spector on the first half of the album: "It's a comment about Phil Spector songs. The second half is whatever I had lying around. Most people listen just to the first half of the record and assume it's all like that, a Phil Spector tribute or something, which it really isn't."

The front cover was painted by Wendy Smith, the girlfriend of Stuart Moxham from Young Marble Giants, and the title of the album is taken from the John Steinbeck novel The Wayward Bus.

== Release ==
In 1994, The Wayward Bus was released by Merge Records in a compilation with the band's first album, Distant Plastic Trees. In 2016, Merge reissued this compilation as a double LP set.

== Track listing ==
All tracks are written by Stephin Merritt.

No.	Title	Length
1.	"When You Were My Baby"	2:43
2.	"The Saddest Story Ever Told"	2:12
3.	"Lovers from the Moon"	2:52
4.	"Candy"	2:32
5.	"Tokyo Á Go-Go"	3:12
6.	"Summer Lies"	2:59
7.	"Old Orchard Beach"	2:54
8.	"Jeremy"	3:01
9.	"Dancing in Your Eyes"	2:56
10.	"Suddenly There Is a Tidal Wave"	3:18

== Personnel ==
- Stephin Merritt – songwriting, instrumentation and production
- Claudia Gonson – cocktail drums
- Sam Davol – cello

Additional personnel

- Susan Anway – vocals
- Johny Blood – tuba, horns
- Wendy Smith – album cover
