= Distortion (The Magnetic Fields album) =

Studio album by The Magnetic Fields
- Released: January 15, 2008
- Recorded: Mother West, New York
- Genres: Indie pop, noise pop, shoegaze
- Length: 38:46
- Label: Nonesuch
- Producer: Stephin Merritt

The Magnetic Fields chronology
| i (2004) | Distortion (2008) | Realism (2010) |

Singles from Distortion
- 1. "California Girls" Released: 2007; 2. "Three-Way" Released: 2008; 3. "Please Stop Dancing" Released: 2008 (promo)

Distortion is the eighth studio album by American indie pop band the Magnetic Fields. It was released on January 15, 2008 on Nonesuch Records.

== Recording ==
As the album's title implies, several of the musical performances featured are distorted by various means. In particular, the album's sound was influenced by the 1985 album Psychocandy by the Jesus and Mary Chain.

Distortion was recorded at Mother West in New York City. It was produced by Stephin Merritt and co-produced by Charles Newman.

No synthesizers were used to record the album; it is the second in a "no-synth trilogy", succeeding the 2004 album i and preceding 2010's Realism.

== Release ==
Distortion debuted at number 77 on the U.S. Billboard 200 chart, selling about 8,000 copies in its first week.

== Reception ==
Professional ratings
Aggregate scores
| Source | Rating |
|---|---|
| Metacritic | 79/100 |
Review scores
| Source | Rating |
| AllMusic | 3.5/5 stars |
| The A.V. Club | A |
| Entertainment Weekly | A− |
| The Guardian | 2/5 stars |
| The Independent | 4/5 stars |
| MSN Music (Consumer Guide) | A |
| NME | 8/10 |
| Pitchfork | 8.0/10 |
| Rolling Stone | 4/5 stars |
| Spin | 3/5 stars |

Distortion has been well received by critics. It currently holds a 79/100 rating at review aggregator website Metacritic.

== Track listing ==
All tracks are written by Stephin Merritt.

| No. | Title | Lead vocals | Length |
|---|---|---|---|
| 1. | "Three-Way" | Sam Davol, Shirley Simms & Claudia Gonson | 3:01 |
| 2. | "California Girls" | Simms & Gonson | 3:00 |
| 3. | "Old Fools" | Merritt | 3:02 |
| 4. | "Xavier Says" | Simms | 2:42 |
| 5. | "Mr. Mistletoe" | Merritt | 2:59 |
| 6. | "Please Stop Dancing" | Gonson & Merritt | 3:01 |
| 7. | "Drive On, Driver" | Simms | 2:51 |
| 8. | "Too Drunk to Dream" | Merritt | 3:00 |
| 9. | "Till the Bitter End" | Simms | 3:03 |
| 10. | "I'll Dream Alone" | Merritt | 3:08 |
| 11. | "The Nun's Litany" | Simms | 2:58 |
| 12. | "Zombie Boy" | Merritt | 3:05 |
| 13. | "Courtesans" | Simms | 2:59 |

== Personnel ==
=== The Magnetic Fields ===
- Stephin Merritt – vocals, instrumentation, production, mixing
- Claudia Gonson – drums, piano, Farfisa organ, backing vocals, management
- Sam Davol – cello
- John Woo – lead guitar
- Shirley Simms – vocals

=== Additional personnel ===
- Daniel Handler – accordion
- A. Klasinski (Alexandra Klasinski), I. Pearle (Ida Pearle), R. Stevens (Robert Stevens) – "orgiasts"

=== Technical ===
- Charles Newman – production, mixing
- Tom Rogers – mixing, additional mastering
- Robert Stevens – engineering assistance
- Jeff Lipton – mastering
- Evan Gaffney Design – sleeve design
- Marcelo Krasilcic – sleeve photography
- Michael English – logo design
