= Eban and Charley =

- Directed by: James Bolton
- Written by: James Bolton
- Produced by: Chris Monlux
- Starring: Brent Fellows, Gio Black Peter
- Cinematography: Judy Irola
- Edited by: Elizabeth Edwards
- Music by: Stephin Merritt
- Distributed by: Picture This! Entertainment
- Release dates: 12 June 2000 (San Francisco, California)
- Running time: 86 minutes

Eban and Charley is a 2000 independent drama film written and directed by James Bolton. It follows the romantic relationship between Eban (Brent Fellows), a 29-year-old gay man, and Charley (Gio Black Peter), a 14-year-old boy. Despite being about a very controversial topic (namely, age disparity in sexual relationships), the film addresses these issues in a low-key, relaxed manner. The film also addresses the consequences that Eban and Charley's relationship provokes with their parents. Its plot is based on an incident in which one of Bolton's friends was dumped by his older boyfriend, because their parents did not approve of their age disparity.

== Cast ==
- Brent Fellows as Eban
- Gio Black Peter as Charley
- Nolan V. Chard as Charley's father
- Ron Upton as Eban's father
- Ellie Nicholson as Sunshine
- Drew Zeller as Kevin
- Pam Munter as Eban's mother

== Soundtrack ==
Eban & Charley

Soundtrack album by Stephin Merritt
- Released: January 22, 2002
- Genre: Pop music
- Length: 36:58
- Label: Merge

Stephin Merritt chronology
Eban & Charley (2002)	Pieces of April (2003)

The soundtrack to Eban and Charley was written and recorded by The Magnetic Fields' Stephin Merritt. The soundtrack album was released on January 22, 2002 on Merge Records, and was Merritt's first recording under his birth name. Merritt told Rolling Stone that he wanted to keep the music to the film open-ended, saying of the film, "If it was a love story it would be gushy strings, and if it were a horror show it would be horn blasts, so I decided to go a third way."

According to Metacritic, the film's soundtrack album has received generally favorable reviews from critics, with a score of 68 out of 100. Richie Unterberger gave it 3 out of 5 stars in a review he wrote for AllMusic and named it his fifth favorite album of 2001 in his list for Rolling Stone, writing "This soundtrack isn't a major effort from the Magnetic Fields man, but a modest triumph of subdued gloom all the same."

Professional ratings
Aggregate scores
Source	Rating
Metacritic	68/100
Review scores
Source	Rating
AllMusic	3/5 stars
Los Angeles Times	3/4 stars
Neumu	7/10
Pitchfork	7.3/10
The Rolling Stone Album Guide	2/5 stars
The Stranger	2/4 stars

=== Track listing ===
1. Mother – 0:38
2. Cricket Problem – 2:18
3. Some Sunny Day – 1:46
4. O Tannenbaum – 2:05
5. Poppyland – 3:19
6. Drowned Sailors – 1:37
7. Maria Maria Maria – 4:26
8. Titles – 1:28
9. This Little Ukulele – 1:21
10. Tea Party – 1:09
11. Tiny Flying Player Pianos – 1:14
12. Mother Remembered – 0:45
13. Victorian Robots – 2:06
14. Water Torture – 3:02
15. Greensleeves – 2:46
16. Stage Rain – 6:58

== Release ==
The film was first released at the Frameline Film Festival (then known as the San Francisco International Lesbian & Gay Film Festival) on June 12, 2000. On December 14, 2001, it was released on video by Picture This! Entertainment. In 2002, it opened at the Cinema Village in New York City.

== Reception ==
The film received largely negative reviews from critics. On Rotten Tomatoes, it has a score of 33%, based on 9 critics' reviews, and on Metacritic, it has a score of 30 out of 100, indicating "generally unfavorable reviews," based on 11 reviews.

The New York Times' Elvis Mitchell gave the film a 1 out of 5 rating, writing that it "might best be described as preaching to a sparse congregation, or else [Director James] Bolton is simply out to bore people into submission." Ed Park of the Village Voice wrote that "Preachy and humorless, Eban and Charley shocks only by the quality of its numbing solipsism." Maitland McDonagh, writing for TV Guide, gave the film one star out of 4, calling it "earnest but unenlightening" and writing that Bolton "undermines his own carefully balanced presentation of the situation by making 29-year-old Eban so creepy."

The Los Angeles Times' Kevin Thomas was more favorable, writing in his review of the film that "Few people will be able to go along with Bolton's point of view regarding relationships between adults and underage youths, but there's no denying the writer-director, in his feature debut, has avoided sensationalism in telling this story." Another favorable review was written in the Chicago Tribune by Patrick Z. McGavin, who gave the film 3 out of 4 stars. McGavin wrote that "The movie is never cheap or sensationalistic, and the performances are finely understated. Though he shot the work on video, Bolton draws on brooding Pacific Northwest locations to excellent effect."
