= Dudley Klute =

American singer-songwriter

- Also known as: "The Pretty One"
- Born: Dudley Kludt
- Origin: Boston, MA
- Occupation: Singer-songwriter
- Instrument(s): Vocals, percussion, bass
- Years active: 1980s-present
- Labels: Merge, New Dance, Antler, Les Disques du Crépuscule, LTM, Affairs of the Heart

Dudley Klute (born December 10) is an American vocalist and songwriter noted for his work with the Belgian New Wave band Kid Montana in the 1980s, and his subsequent collaborations with Stephin Merritt's The Magnetic Fields (he was a guest singer on 69 Love Songs), LD Beghtol, and other musicians. Additionally, he was one-third of the live-only performance ensemble The Three Terrors along with Merritt and Beghtol. Klute lives in Manhattan.
