= The Lonely Robot =

EP by Future Bible Heroes
- Released: January 21, 2003
- Genre: Synthpop
- Length: 39:02
- Label: Instinct

Future Bible Heroes chronology
Eternal Youth (2002)	The Lonely Robot (2003)	The World Is a Disco Ball (2003)

The Lonely Robot is an EP by American synthpop group Future Bible Heroes, released on January 21, 2003 in the United States on Instinct Records. It consists of five remixes of songs that originally appeared on the Future Bible Heroes' 2002 album Eternal Youth, as well as two new songs.

Professional ratings
Review scores
Source	Rating
AllMusic	2.5/5 stars
PopMatters	(favorable)
Village Voice	(dud)

== Track listing ==
1. The DJ From Outer Space
2. Losing Your Affection (Client On Demand Mix)
3. The World Is A Disco Ball (Rob Rives Club Mix)
4. Losing Your Affection (Sunroof Mix)
5. I'm A Vampire (Extended Mix)
6. Losing Your Affection (Soft Cell 12-Inch Mix)
7. The Lonely Robot

== Personnel ==
- Christopher Ewen – mixing
- Gareth Jones – producer, remixing
- Daniel Miller – producer, remixing
- Rob Rives – producer, remixing
- Ingo Vauk – producer, remixing
