= Shirley Simms =

American singer and songwriter

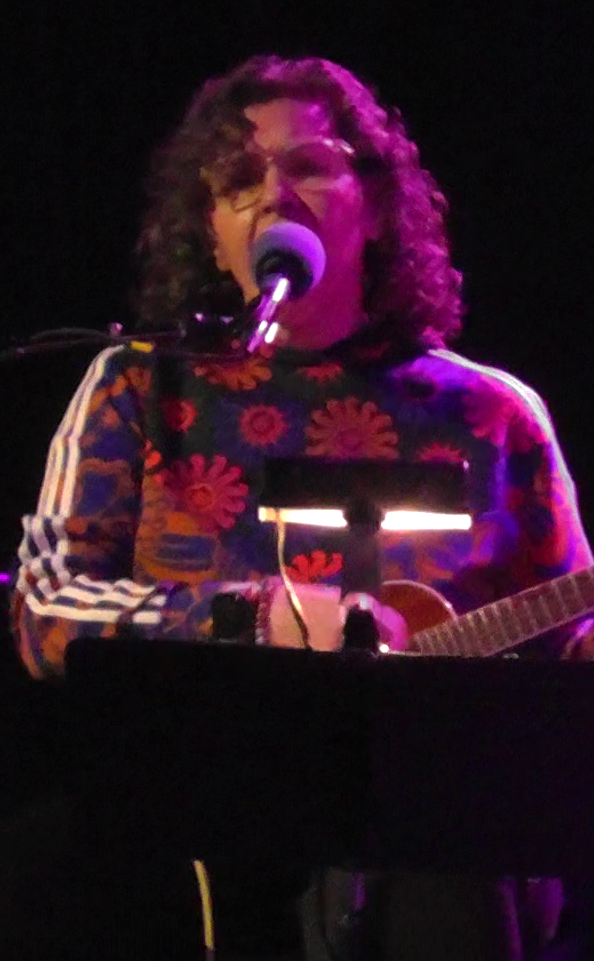

Background information
- Genres: Indie pop
- Occupations: Singer; Songwriter
- Years active: 1980s–present
- Member of: The Magnetic Fields

Shirley Simms is an American singer and songwriter known for her work as a member of indie pop band the Magnetic Fields.

In the late 1980s, before Stephin Merritt started the Magnetic Fields, he and Simms formed the short-lived musical project Buffalo Rome, who self-released a cassette during their existence. Simms was also a member of the Boston-based band Lazy Susan, along with Therese Bellino and the Magnetic Fields' Claudia Gonson. As members of Lazy Susan, Simms and Gonson wrote the song "Plant White Roses", which appeared on the Magnetic Fields' 1991 album Distant Plastic Trees. An alternate version performed by Simms was later included on Merritt's 2011 compilation album Obscurities.

Simms sang on several tracks on the Magnetic Fields' 1999 album 69 Love Songs. She and Merritt alternated between singing lead vocals on the band's 2008 album Distortion. In addition to her vocal work with the Magnetic Fields, she also sometimes plays ukulele for them.

In a 1999 interview, Merritt described Simms as "the best living female vocalist other than Doris Day".
