= Distant Plastic Trees =

Studio album by the Magnetic Fields
- Released: 1991
- Genres: Indie pop; synth-pop
- Length: 36:18
- Labels: PoPuP, Victor, Red Flame
- Producer: Stephin Merritt

The Magnetic Fields chronology
Distant Plastic Trees (1991)	The Wayward Bus (1992)

Singles from Distant Plastic Trees
- 1. "100,000 Fireflies" Released: 1991

Distant Plastic Trees is the debut studio album by American indie pop band the Magnetic Fields, released in 1991. The lead vocals on the album are performed by Susan Anway.

== Style ==
The album has a stripped down sound and largely synthesized instrumentation. Stephin Merritt described the album as "intentionally small" and "influenced by Young Marble Giants". The main instruments on the record are a Roland S-50 sampler, Korg Poly-800 and ARP Odyssey synthesizers, and a Yamaha RX-21 drum machine; "Plant White Roses" features an acoustic guitar. Merritt used Digital Performer for production due to its advanced quantization.

The song "Babies Falling" is a cover of a song by the Wild Stares.

== Release ==
Distant Plastic Trees was originally released in Japan and the United Kingdom on the RCA Victor and Red Flame labels, respectively. The album was released in the United States on the band's own imprint, PoPuP.

Merge Records reissued the album in 1994 as a double album compilation with the band's second album, The Wayward Bus. The song "Plant White Roses" was omitted from the Merge reissue.

== Reception ==
Professional ratings
Review scores
Source	Rating
AllMusic	3/5 stars
Christgau's Consumer Guide	(neither)
The Encyclopedia of Popular Music	3/5 stars
Spin Alternative Record Guide	7/10

(The New) Rolling Stone Album Guide wrote that the first two albums "showcase sexually ambiguous lyrics, loopy arrangements, and the disaffected voice of Susan Anway... But they also suffer from an air of inconsequentiality." Trouser Press wrote that "the baroque pop structures of songs like 'Smoke Signals' are redolent of the classics Merritt clearly holds dear, but his impressionistic wordplay — which often alights on bracing, upsetting images — seldom settles into simple cliché."

== Track listing ==
All tracks are written by Stephin Merritt, except where noted.

No.	Title	Writer(s)	Length
1.	"Railroad Boy"		2:59
2.	"Smoke Signals"		3:28
3.	"You Love to Fail"		2:30
4.	"Kings"		2:15
5.	"Babies Falling"	Steve Gregoropoulos; Fran Miller; Justin Burrill	3:18
6.	"Living in an Abandoned Firehouse with You"	Merritt; John Gage; Genève Gil	3:58
7.	"Tar-Heel Boy"		2:26
8.	"Falling in Love with the Wolfboy"		4:05
9.	"Josephine"		3:08
10.	"100,000 Fireflies"		3:20
11.	"Plant White Roses"		4:52

== Personnel ==
- Stephin Merritt – songwriting, instrumentation and production

Additional personnel

- Susan Anway – lead vocals
- Ken Michaels – engineering
- Wendy Smith – album cover
- Art Daly – insert photo
