= Andrew in Drag =

Single by The Magnetic Fields

from the album Love at the Bottom of the Sea
- Released: 2012
- Genre: Indie pop
- Length: 2:13
- Label: Merge
- Songwriter: Stephin Merritt

The Magnetic Fields singles chronology
"Please Stop Dancing" (2008)	"Andrew in Drag" (2012)	"Quick!" (2012)

Music video
- "Andrew in Drag" on YouTube

"Andrew in Drag" is a song by American indie pop band the Magnetic Fields, released as the first single from their album Love at the Bottom of the Sea (2012). The song – written from the point of view of a man who sees his straight friend perform in drag and is highly aroused by it – deals with the confusing nature, complexity, and evanescent quality of queer love and lust.

A music video directed by Scott Valins was released on the Merge Records YouTube channel on February 2, 2012.

== Cover versions ==
The song has been covered by the Shins.
