= Future Bible Heroes =

American indie pop band

- Origin: Boston, Massachusetts, U.S.
- Genres: Indie pop, synthpop
- Years active: 1997–present
- Labels: Slow River, Instinct, Merge
- Members: Stephin Merritt; Claudia Gonson; Chris Ewen
- Website: Formerly futurebibleheroes.com, no longer active

Future Bible Heroes is an American indie pop group led by Stephin Merritt, best known for his work with The Magnetic Fields. Merritt shares vocal duties with fellow Magnetic Fields member Claudia Gonson, who sings on the entirety of 2002's Eternal Youth. In contrast to much of Merritt's work with other groups, the Future Bible Heroes work largely on electronica-based disco, with music provided by Chris Ewen, formerly of Figures on a Beach.

In 1995, the group contributed the song "Hopeless" to the AIDS benefit album Red Hot + Bothered, produced by the Red Hot Organization.

== Discography ==
=== Albums ===
- Memories of Love (1997)
- Eternal Youth (2002)
- Partygoing (2013)

=== EPs ===
- Lonely Days (1997)
- I'm Lonely (And I Love It) (EP) (2000)
- The Lonely Robot (2003)

=== Singles ===
- Lonely Days (7") (1998)
- The World Is A Discoball (12") (2003)
