= Showtunes (Stephin Merritt and Chen Shi-zheng album) =

Soundtrack album by Stephin Merritt
- Released: March 16, 2006
- Genre: Indie pop
- Length: 48:33
- Label: Nonesuch

Stephin Merritt chronology
Pieces of April (2003)	Showtunes (2006)	Obscurities (2011)

Showtunes is the result of collaboration between Stephin Merritt with Chen Shi-zheng on three pieces of musical theatre; Orphan of Zhao (2003), Peach Blossom Fan (2004), and My Life as a Fairy Tale (2005). Select tracks from these are featured on this album. It was released on Nonesuch Records on March 16, 2006 but was available from peer-to-peer networks from February 20, 2006. The remainder of songs from the shows were released exclusively through digital music stores.

== Reception ==
Professional ratings
Aggregate scores
Source	Rating
Metacritic	69/100
Review scores
Source	Rating
AllMusic	4/5 stars
Daily Herald	2.5/5 stars
Entertainment Weekly	B
The Gazette	2/5
The Guardian	2/5 stars
The Harvard Crimson	3/5 stars
MusicOMH	4/5 stars
NOW	4/5
Pitchfork	7.5/10
Slant Magazine	3/5 stars

The album received generally favorable reviews from critics; on Metacritic, it has a score of 69 out of 100.

== Track listing ==
1. "Theme from The Orphan of Zhao" – 00:59
2. "At Madam Plum's" [From Peach Blossom Fan] – 02:35
3. "The Top and the Ball" [From My Life as a Fairy Tale] – 01:49
4. "What a Fucking Lovely Day!" [From Orphan of Zhao] – 01:22
5. "Auntie Toothache" [From My Life as a Fairy Tale] – 02:48
6. "It's Hard to Be the Emperor" [From Peach Blossom Fan] – 01:08
7. "Sounds Expensive" [From Peach Blossom Fan] – 01:36
8. "The Red Shoes" [From My Life as a Fairy Tale] – 01:43
9. "Fan Dance Cha-Cha" [From Peach Blossom Fan] – 01:17
10. "The Little Maiden of the Sea" [From My Life as a Fairy Tale] – 03:53
11. "Ukulele Me!" [From Peach Blossom Fan] – 01:08
12. "Train Song" [From Orphan of Zhao] – 01:17
13. "The Little Hebrew Girl" [From My Life as a Fairy Tale] – 02:10
14. "Shall We Sing a Duet?" [From Peach Blossom Fan] – 00:55
15. "The Song of the Humble Serf" [From Orphan of Zhao] – 00:56
16. "The Collar and the Garter" [From My Life as a Fairy Tale] – 01:40
17. "Shall We Sing a Duet?" (Reprise) [From Peach Blossom Fan] – 01:38
18. "Sorry, Wrong Show" [From Peach Blossom Fan] – 01:41
19. "The Storks" [From My Life as a Fairy Tale] – 01:24
20. "In the Spring, When I Was Young" [From Orphan of Zhao] – 02:02
21. "The Ugly Little Duck" [From My Life as a Fairy Tale] – 03:41
22. "And He Would Say..." [From Peach Blossom Fan] – 03:02
23. "The World is Not Made of Flowers" [From Orphan of Zhao] – 01:14
24. "Behold the Lowly Centipede" [From Peach Blossom Fan] – 01:41
25. "In China, Said the Moon..." [From My Life as a Fairy Tale] – 03:37
26. "Hail! Son of Heaven" [From Peach Blossom Fan] – 01:06
