= Watch Your Mouth (novel) =

2000 novel by Daniel Handler

- Author: Daniel Handler
- Language: English
- Genre: Novel, Comedy
- Publisher: Thomas Dunne Books
- Publication date: July 2000
- Publication place: United States
- Media type: Print (hardback & paperback)
- Pages: 272 pp
- ISBN: 0-312-20940-1 (hardback edition)
- OCLC: 43657128
- Dewey Decimal: 813/.54 21
- LC Class: PS3558.A4636 W38 2000

Watch Your Mouth is a novel by American writer Daniel Handler.

It tells the story of protagonist Joseph's lust-filled college summer spent with his Jewish girlfriend Cynthia Glass in her hometown of Pittsburgh, Pennsylvania. Handler has described it as an "opera in book form".

== Plot ==
The first part of the novel is laid out as an opera, with act and scene numbers as chapter titles and each of the characters being assigned a singing voice. Joseph quickly begins to suspect that Cynthia's entire family is engaging in incestuous behaviour, and that her mother Mimi is building a golem in the basement. The first part of the novel ends (operatically) in death. The second part is presented somewhat more conventionally, as Joseph attempts to recover from the events of the first part; this half of the book follows the form of a 12-step program. The first section of the novel is printed in black ink, while the 12-step program is printed in dark red.
