= Daniel Handler =

American writer (born 1970)

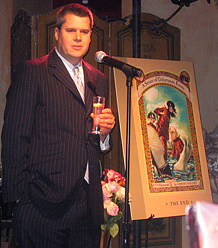
- Handler in 2006
- Born: February 28, 1970 (age 56); San Francisco, California, U.S.
- Occupations: Author; musician; screenwriter; television writer; television producer
- Spouse: Lisa Brown
- Children: 1
- Writing career
- Pen name: Lemony Snicket
- Period: 1998–present
- Genre: Children's literature
- Notable works: A Series of Unfortunate Events, All the Wrong Questions, The Basic Eight, Watch Your Mouth, Adverbs

Daniel Handler (born February 28, 1970) is an American writer, musician, and television producer. He is best known for his children's book series A Series of Unfortunate Events and All the Wrong Questions, published under the pen name Lemony Snicket. The former was adapted into a film in 2004 as well as a Netflix series from 2017 to 2019.

Handler has published adult novels and a stage play under his real name, along with other children's books under the Snicket pseudonym. His first book, a satirical fiction piece titled The Basic Eight, was rejected by many publishers for its dark subject matter.

Handler has also played the accordion in several bands, and he appeared on the indie pop band The Magnetic Fields' album 69 Love Songs.

== Life ==
Handler was born in San Francisco, California, the son of Sandra Handler (née Walpole), a retired City College of San Francisco dean, and Louis Handler, an accountant. His father was a Jewish refugee from Germany in 1939. His mother is distantly related to British writer Hugh Walpole. Of his early religious upbringing, Handler said, "I had a fairly standard Reform Jewish upbringing, I guess, in terms of the religious side of it." He has a younger sister, Rebecca Handler. He attended Commodore Sloat Elementary, Herbert Hoover Middle School, and Lowell High School. He graduated from Wesleyan University in 1992. He was awarded the 1992 Connecticut Student Poet Prize, which he has said he won by ripping off Elizabeth Bishop. He is an alumnus of the San Francisco Boys Chorus.

Handler has been a voracious reader since childhood. The first book he bought as a child was The Blue Aspic by Edward Gorey, of whom he is a fan. He enjoyed the writings of William Maxwell and Roald Dahl.

He is married to Lisa Brown, an illustrator he met in college. They have a child, born in 2003. They live in an Edwardian house in San Francisco.

Handler has expressed ambivalence about his wealth and the expectations it creates. He often donates money to charitable causes. Handler and his wife have also donated $1,000,000 to Planned Parenthood, and he has supported the Occupy Wall Street movement.

Handler describes himself as a secular humanist and "pretty much" an atheist. He describes himself as having developed a "feminist consciousness" while in college.

== Professional work ==
=== Books ===
Six of Handler's major works have been published under his name. His first, The Basic Eight, was rejected by many publishers for its subject matter and tone (a dark view of a teenage girl's life). Handler has said the novel was rejected 37 times before being published in 1999.

Watch Your Mouth, his second novel, was completed before publication of The Basic Eight. It follows a more operatic theme, complete with stage directions and various acts. Watch Your Mouth's second half replaces the opera troupe with the form of a 12-step recovery program, linguistically undergone by the protagonist. In April 2005, Handler published Adverbs, a collection of short stories that he says are "about love." It was followed in 2011 by Why We Broke Up, which received a 2012 Michael L. Printz honor award. Handler's 2015 novel We Are Pirates is about a modern-age pirate who "wants to be an old-fashioned kind of pirate". His most recent novel, All the Dirty Parts, was published in 2017 and "takes the blunt and constant presence of a male teen's sexuality and considers it with utmost seriousness".

Handler served as a judge for the PEN/Phyllis Naylor Working Writer Fellowship in 2012. In 2016, he founded Per Diem Press, a poetry competition for young writers. He awarded $1,000 to three winners and published a chapbook of their work.

At the November 2014 National Book Award ceremony, Handler made a controversial remark after author Jacqueline Woodson was presented with an award for Brown Girl Dreaming. He said that Woodson was allergic to watermelon, a reference to the racist watermelon stereotype. His comments were immediately criticized; Handler apologized and donated $10,000 to We Need Diverse Books and promised to match donations up to $100,000. In a New York Times op-ed published shortly thereafter, "The Pain of the Watermelon Joke", Woodson wrote that "in making light of that deep and troubled history" with his joke, Handler had come from a place of ignorance, but she underscored the need for her mission to "give people a sense of this country's brilliant and brutal history, so no one ever thinks they can walk onto a stage one evening and laugh at another's too often painful past".

==== Lemony Snicket ====
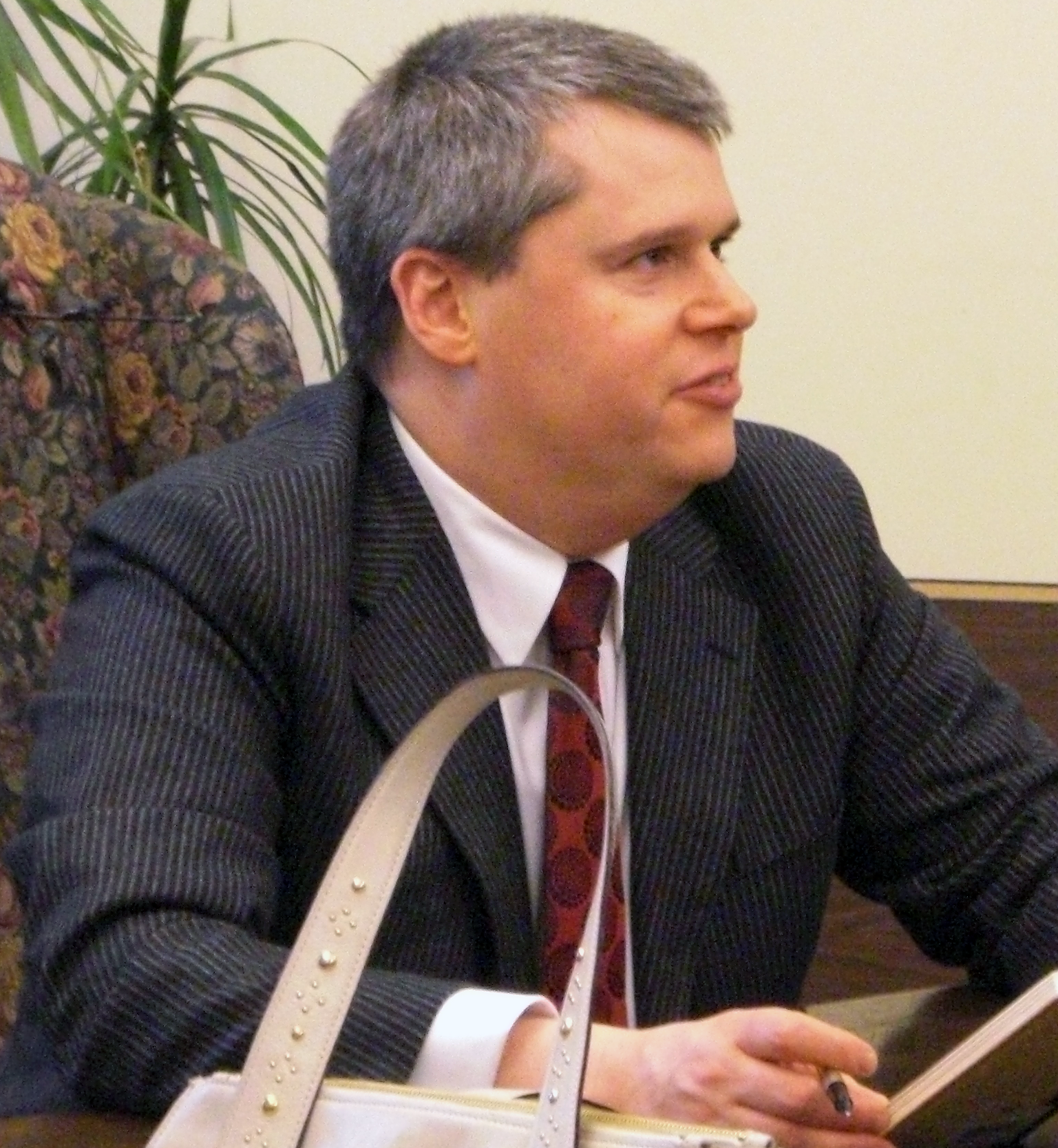
Handler at a book signing in 2006

Handler wrote the bestselling series of 13 novels A Series of Unfortunate Events under the Snicket pseudonym from 1999 to 2006. The series is about three orphaned children who experience increasingly terrible events after their parents die and their home burns. Snicket acts as the orphans' narrator and biographer. Handler narrated the audiobooks for the third through fifth books in the series before handing back the narrating job to the original narrator, Tim Curry.

From 2012 to 2015, Handler published the four-part series All the Wrong Questions under the name Lemony Snicket; the books explore Snicket's childhood and V.F.D. apprenticeship in the failing town Stain'd-by-the-Sea. He has also written other children's novels under the Snicket name, including companion books to his two Snicket series, and children's books such as The Composer is Dead and The Latke Who Couldn't Stop Screaming.

=== Music ===
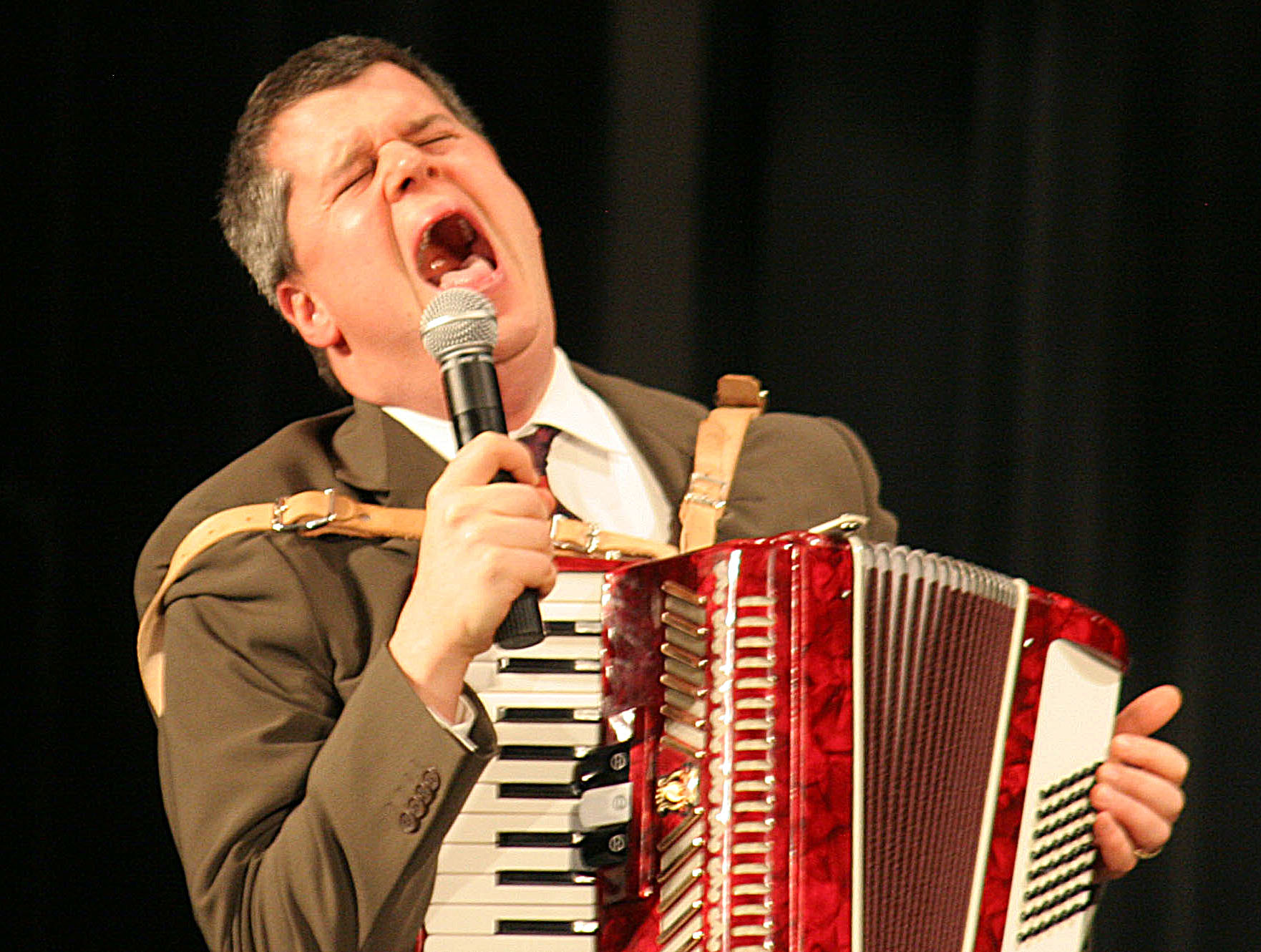
Handler playing and singing at a reading of The End in 2006

Handler was in two bands after college, the Edith Head Trio and Tzamboni, but his music received little attention until 69 Love Songs, a three-album set by The Magnetic Fields on which he played accordion. In the box set of the project, Handler interviews band leader Stephin Merritt about the project. He also appears in Kerthy Fix's and Gail O'Hara's 2009 documentary Strange Powers, about Merritt and the Magnetic Fields.

Handler has played accordion in several other Merritt projects, including The 6ths and The Gothic Archies, the last of which provided songs for the A Series of Unfortunate Events audiobooks. In 2006, a Gothic Archies album was released with all 13 songs from the 13 A Series of Unfortunate Events audiobooks, along with two bonus songs.

In the audio commentary on the film adaptation Lemony Snicket's A Series of Unfortunate Events, Handler plays a song about how depressing it is to have leeches in a film.

Handler wrote the lyrics to the song "Radio", performed by One Ring Zero, and "The Gibbons Girl", by Chris Ewen's The Hidden Variable.

=== Theater ===
In 2017, Handler wrote the play Imaginary Comforts, and The Story of The Ghost of The Dead Rabbit, which was performed at the Berkeley Repertory Theatre. The satirical play follows the intertwining lives of three characters and is inspired by the grief Handler felt after his father's death.

=== Film and television ===
Handler has also had some success in film. He produced the screenplay for Rick, based on the Verdi opera Rigoletto, as well as Kill the Poor, based on the novel by Joel Rose.

Handler was involved in the screenwriting process for the film Lemony Snicket's A Series of Unfortunate Events but was ultimately removed from the project. After writing eight drafts of the script for Sonnenfeld, he was replaced by Robert Gordon in May 2003. Handler approved of the changes that were made to his original screenplay. "I was offered credit on the film for screenwriting by the Writers Guild of America," Handler said, "but I didn't take it because I didn't write it. I felt like it would be an insult to the guy who did."

Handler submitted a commentary track for the DVD version alongside director Brad Silberling. In character as Lemony Snicket, he derides the Lemony Snicket in the film as an impostor and plays the accordion and sings about leeches rather than pay attention to the film. Many times during the track, he shows great sympathy towards the Baudelaire children and implies that he is being held captive by the director to do the commentary.

Handler was a writer on the Netflix series A Series of Unfortunate Events, also contributing lyrics to the show's theme song, which varies each episode. The show has won several accolades, including a Peabody Award in 2017 for excellence in children's and youth programming.

== Allegations of inappropriate sexual comments ==
In February 2018, Handler signed an online pledge to boycott conferences that do not have or enforce harassment policies. Underneath his comment, author Kate Messner recounted an incident in which she said Handler had made inappropriate jokes directed at her, such as "Are you a virgin, too?!" and "These children's book events always turn into orgies!" This led to many other women accusing Handler of verbal sexual harassment at book conferences; among the public accusations are stories of Handler telling a woman he had just met to kiss a random stranger; making crass comments to a teenage girl and walking off without apology when confronted; and calling a stranger a "hot blonde" and making a "uni-ball" double entendre in front of young children. The incident occurred during the larger Me Too movement.

Handler apologized for his behavior, saying, "It has never been my wish to insult any of my professional colleagues"; "my sense of humor has not been for everyone"; "as a survivor of sexual violence, I also know very well how words or behaviors that are harmless or even liberating to some people can be upsetting to others"; and "I am listening and willing to listen; I am learning and willing to learn." Wesleyan University students began to protest Handler's planned commencement speech at the university; in March 2018, Handler withdrew from the appearance, and was replaced by Anita Hill.

== Bibliography ==
Handler has published a variety of books under the name Lemony Snicket, most notably the 13 books in the Unfortunate Events series. These books are listed under Lemony Snicket bibliography.

This section lists works published as Daniel Handler:

- The Basic Eight, Thomas Dunne (1998)
- Watch Your Mouth, St. Martin's Press/HarperCollins (2000)
- How to Dress for Every Occasion, by the Pope (with illustrations by Sarah "Pinkie" Bennett, pseudonym for Lisa Brown), McSweeney's (2005)
- Adverbs, St. Martin's Press/HarperCollins (2006)
- Why We Broke Up (2011)
- We Are Pirates (2014)
- All the Dirty Parts (2017)
- Bottle Grove (2019)
- And Then? And Then? What Else?, Liveright (2024)

Handler also edited or contributed to the following books:

- Nonsense Novels by Stephen Leacock (introduction), New York Review of Books Classics (2004)
- Noisy Outlaws, Unfriendly Blobs and Some Other Things That Aren't as Scary, Maybe, Depending on How You Feel About Lost Lands, Stray Cellphones, Creatures from the Sky, Parents Who Disappear in Peru, a Man Named Lars Farf and One Other Story We Couldn't Quite Finish, So Maybe You Could Help Us Out by McSweeney's (Introduction and Unfinished story)
- The Confidence-Man: His Masquerade by Herman Melville (preface), Dalkey Archive Press (2007)
- An essay, "Wining", in the anthology Money Changes Everything: Twenty-Two Writers Tackle the Last Taboo with Tales of Sudden Windfalls, Staggering Debts, and Other Surprising Turns of Fortune (2007)
- The Hour: A Cocktail Manifesto by Bernard DeVoto (introduction), republished by Tin House Books (2010)
- "Half-Minute Horrors"

== Discography ==
- 69 Love Songs – The Magnetic Fields
- Hyacinths and Thistles – The 6ths
- The Tragic Treasury: Songs from A Series of Unfortunate Events – The Gothic Archies
- Distortion – The Magnetic Fields
- Nevermind the Context – Moth Wranglers
- The Composer Is Dead – A collaboration with Nathaniel Stookey, premiered in San Francisco at Davies Symphony Hall on July 8, 2006
- Realism – The Magnetic Fields
- Barricade – Stars
- Love at the Bottom of the Sea – The Magnetic Fields

== Filmography ==
- Kill the Poor (2003) – screenplay
- Rick (2003) – writer
- Lemony Snicket's A Series of Unfortunate Events (2004) – based on the books The Bad Beginning, The Reptile Room and The Wide Window
- A Series of Unfortunate Events (2017–2019) – based on the book series, writer, executive producer, title theme, original song lyrics
