= The Magnetic Fields =

American band

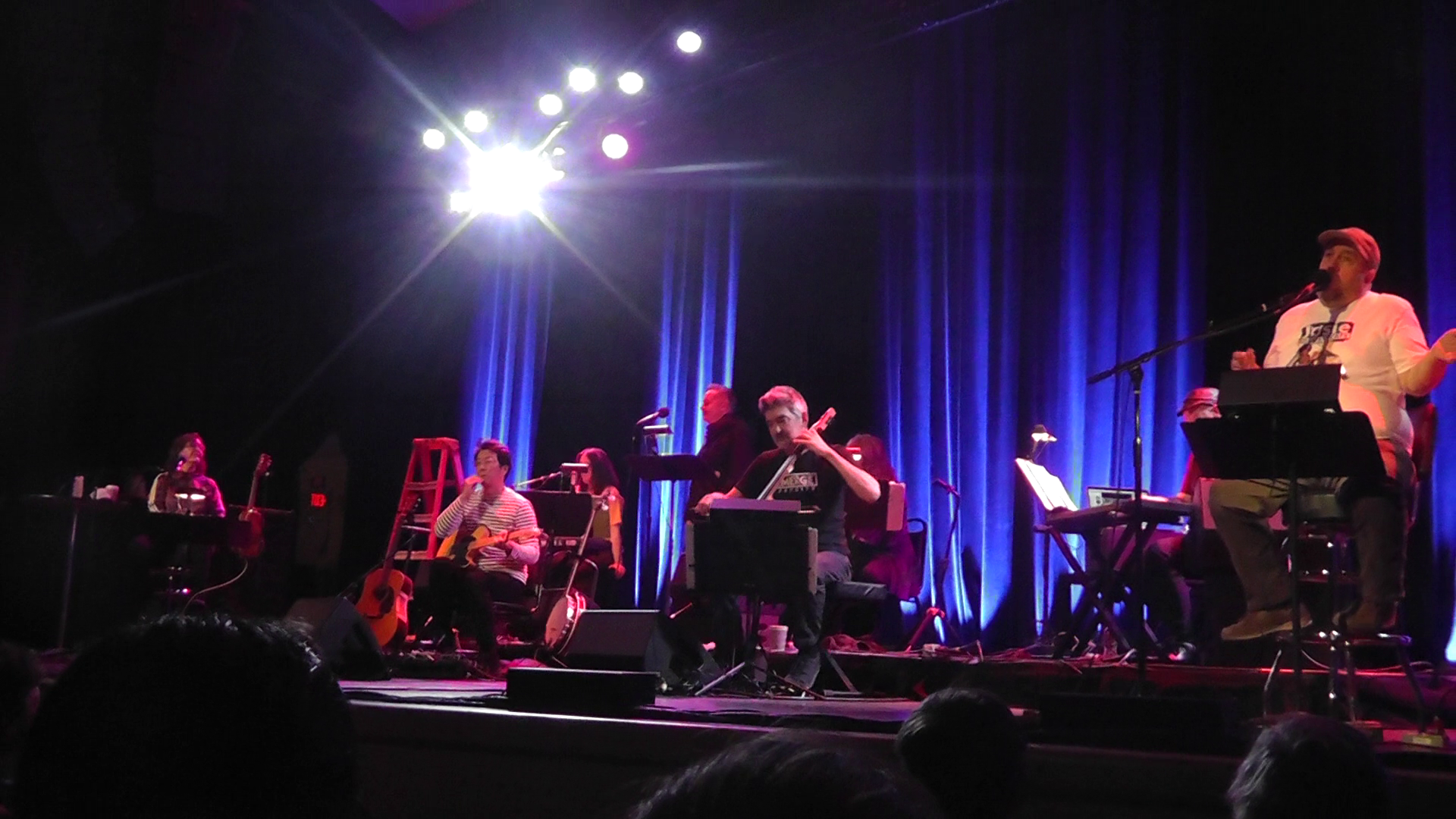
- In concert in 2024

Background information
- Origin: Boston, Massachusetts, U.S.
- Genres: Indie pop; experimental pop; synth-pop
- Years active: 1989–present
- Labels: Feel Good All Over; Merge; Nonesuch
- Members: Stephin Merritt; Claudia Gonson; Sam Davol; John Woo; Shirley Simms; Chris Ewen; Anthony Kaczynski
- Past members: Susan Anway: LD Beghtol
- Website: houseoftomorrow.com

The Magnetic Fields are an American band founded and led by Stephin Merritt. Merritt is the group's primary songwriter, producer, and vocalist, as well as frequent multi-instrumentalist. The band is named after the André Breton/Philippe Soupault novel Les Champs Magnétiques.

The band released their debut single "100,000 Fireflies" in 1991. The single was typical of the band's earlier career, characterized by synthesized instrumentation by Merritt, with lead vocals provided by Susan Anway (and then by Stephin Merritt himself, from the House of Tomorrow EP onwards). A more traditional band later materialized; it is now composed of Merritt, Claudia Gonson, Sam Davol, and John Woo, with occasional guest vocals by Shirley Simms. The band's best-known work is the 1999 three-volume concept album 69 Love Songs. It was followed in the succeeding years by a "no-synth" trilogy: i (2004), Distortion (2008), and Realism (2010). The band's latest album, Quickies, was released on May 29, 2020.

== History ==
The band began as Merritt's studio project under the name Buffalo Rome. With the help of friend Claudia Gonson, who had played in Merritt's band the Zinnias during high school, a live band was assembled in Boston, where Merritt and Gonson lived, to play Merritt's compositions. The band's first live performance was in 1991 at T.T. the Bear's Place in Cambridge, Massachusetts, where they were mistakenly billed as Magnetophone, an alias used briefly in that year by Damon Krukowski and Naomi Yang of Galaxie 500.

The 1999 triple album 69 Love Songs showcased Merritt's songwriting and lyrical abilities and the group's musicianship, demonstrated by the use of such varied instruments as the ukulele, banjo, accordion, cello, mandolin, flute, xylophone, and the Marxophone, in addition to their usual setting of synthesizers, guitars, and effects. Influences included Fleetwood Mac, Billie Holiday and Orchestral Manoeuvres in the Dark. The album features vocalists Shirley Simms, Dudley Klute, L.D. Beghtol, and Gonson, each of whom sings lead on six songs as well as various backing vocals, plus Daniel Handler (who has written under the pseudonym Lemony Snicket) on accordion, and longtime collaborator Christopher Ewen (of Future Bible Heroes) as guest arranger/synthesist.

The band's albums i (2004) and Distortion (2008) both followed the album theme structure of 69 Love Songs: the song titles on i begin with the letter (or, in the case of half the songs' titles, the pronoun) "I", while Distortion was an experiment in combining noise music with their typically unconventional musical approach. The liner notes claim the album was made without synthesizers. According to an article, "To celebrate the release of Distortion, Merritt and the Magnetic Fields played mini-residencies in cities around the country, culminating with six shows at Chicago's Old Town School of Folk Music."

Realism was released in January 2010, concluding what Merritt termed the "no-synth" trilogy (following i and Distortion). The next album produced would feature synthesizers "almost exclusively".

In 2010, the documentary film Strange Powers: Stephin Merritt and the Magnetic Fields made its debut in film festivals around the world. It was directed by Kerthy Fix and Gail O'Hara. Shot over a period of 10 years, it discusses the formation of the band, Stephin's friendship with Claudia Gonson, the production of various albums, and Stephin's move to California from New York. It won the Outfest 2010 Grand Jury Prize for Feature Documentary.

The band was chosen by Jeff Mangum of Neutral Milk Hotel to perform a rare festival performance at the All Tomorrow's Parties event that he curated in March 2012 in Minehead, England.

The band released its tenth full-length album, Love at the Bottom of the Sea, on March 6, 2012. This album, compared by Dan Raby to 69 Love Songs, brought back the use of synthesizers. Merritt told fans on his website, "I was very happy to be using synthesizers in ways that I had not done before. Most of the synthesizers on the record didn't exist when we were last using synthesizers." The song "Andrew in Drag" garnered much attention, receiving play from entities such as CBS News and NPR's All Songs Considered. In 2012, the Magnetic Fields celebrated its new album by launching a North American and European tour. It began on March 6, the release date of Love at the Bottom of the Sea, and continued for two months.

In 2016, it was announced that the band's eleventh studio album, 50 Song Memoir, would contain fifty songs, akin to the 69 Love Songs concept, one to commemorate each year since Stephin Merritt was born. It was released in March 2017.

On May 15, 2020, the band digitally released the album Quickies—twenty-eight songs under three minutes long—through Nonesuch Records. The first single, "The Day the Politicians Died", was released on February 25, followed by "Kraftwerk in a Blackout" on April 1, "I Want to Join a Biker Gang" on April 16, and "I've Got a Date With Jesus" on May 8. The band released a vinyl box set of the album on May 29, followed by the CD on June 16. Former lead singer Susan Anway died in September 2021.

== Members ==
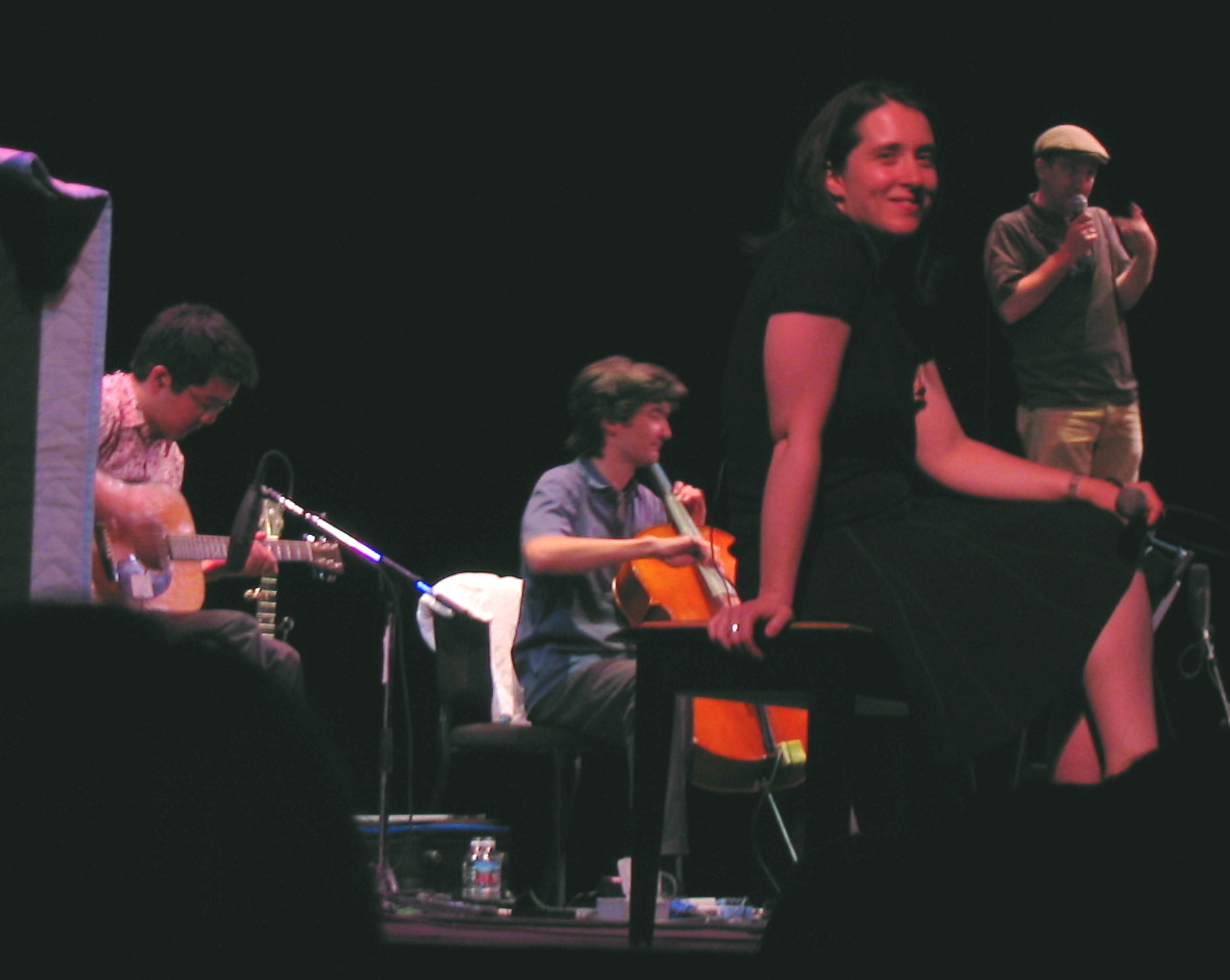
The Magnetic Fields in concert, 2004. From left to right: John Woo, Sam Davol, Claudia Gonson, Stephin Merritt.

=== Official members ===
- Stephin Merritt – guitars, synthesizers, ukulele, keyboards, bass guitar, drum machines, percussion, miscellaneous instruments, vocals (1989–present)
- Claudia Gonson – piano, drums, percussion, keyboards, vocals, group manager (1989–present)
- Sam Davol – cello, flute (1989–present)
- John Woo – guitars, banjo (1994–present)
- Shirley Simms – autoharp, ukulele, vocals (1999 (guest vocalist); 2007–present)
- Chris Ewen – synthesizers, keyboards (1999 (guest musician); 2016–present)
- Anthony Kaczynski – guitar, vocals (2016–present)

=== Other contributors ===
Current and former contributors include singers Susan Anway, Dudley Klute, Nell Beram, and LD Beghtol, as well as instrumentalists Anthony Kaczynski, Johny Blood, Quince Marcum, Daniel Handler, Chris Ewen and engineer/producer Charles Newman and instrumentalist and singer Pinky Weitzman.

== Discography ==
Studio albums

- Distant Plastic Trees (1991)
- The Wayward Bus (1992)
- The Charm of the Highway Strip (1994)
- Holiday (1994)
- Get Lost (1995)
- 69 Love Songs (1999)
- i (2004)
- Distortion (2008)
- Realism (2010)
- Love at the Bottom of the Sea (2012)
- 50 Song Memoir (2017)
- Quickies (2020)
