= Sam Davol =

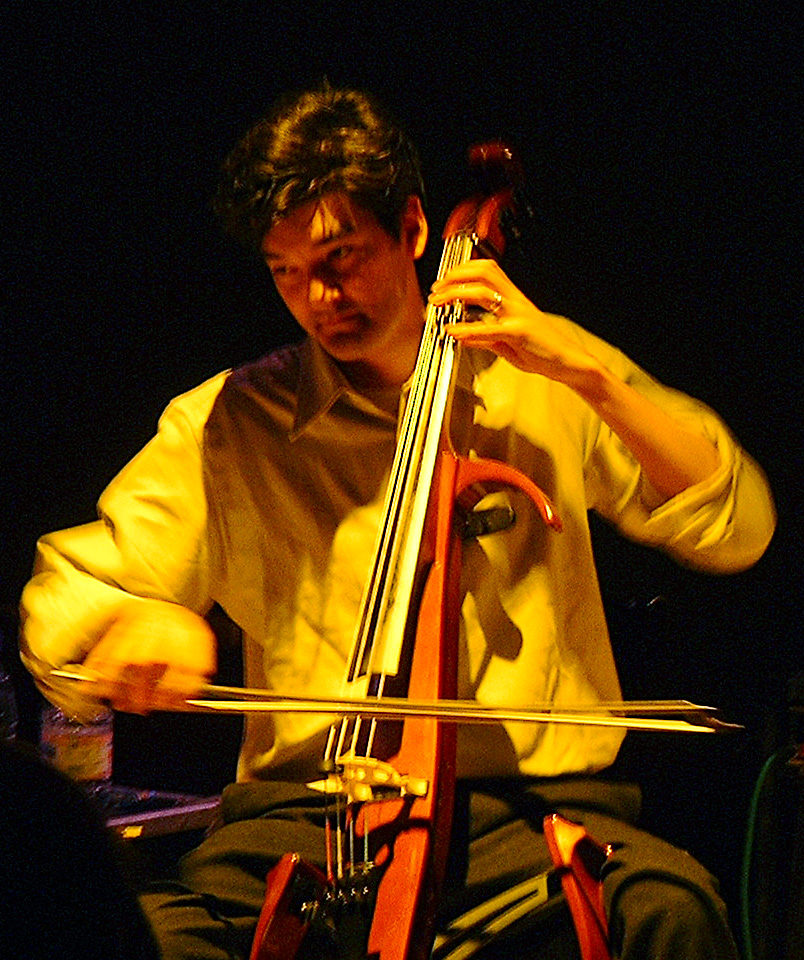
- Sam Davol playing with The Magnetic Fields in 2001

Background information
- Born: 1969 or 1970 (age 56–57)
- Occupation: Musician
- Instruments: Cello, flute
- Member of: The Magnetic Fields
- Spouse: Leslie Davol

Samuel Bradford Davol is a musician best known for his work with the indie pop band The Magnetic Fields. He is featured several times in videos for The Magnetic Fields, and in the opening for "Born on a Train", his cello is featured at the beginning of the video. He also appears in Strange Powers, a 2009 documentary about Stephin Merritt.

He graduated from Concord Academy in 1988. He graduated magna cum laude from Harvard University and has a J.D. degree from New York University School of Law. He and his family now live in Lower Manhattan.

Along with his wife, Leslie, Davol is a founder and executive director of Street Lab, a non-profit organization which creates programs for public space. Notable among these is the Uni Project, founded by Sam and Leslie Davol, which brings mobile libraries and other educational programs to public urban spaces.
