= Claudia Gonson =

American drummer

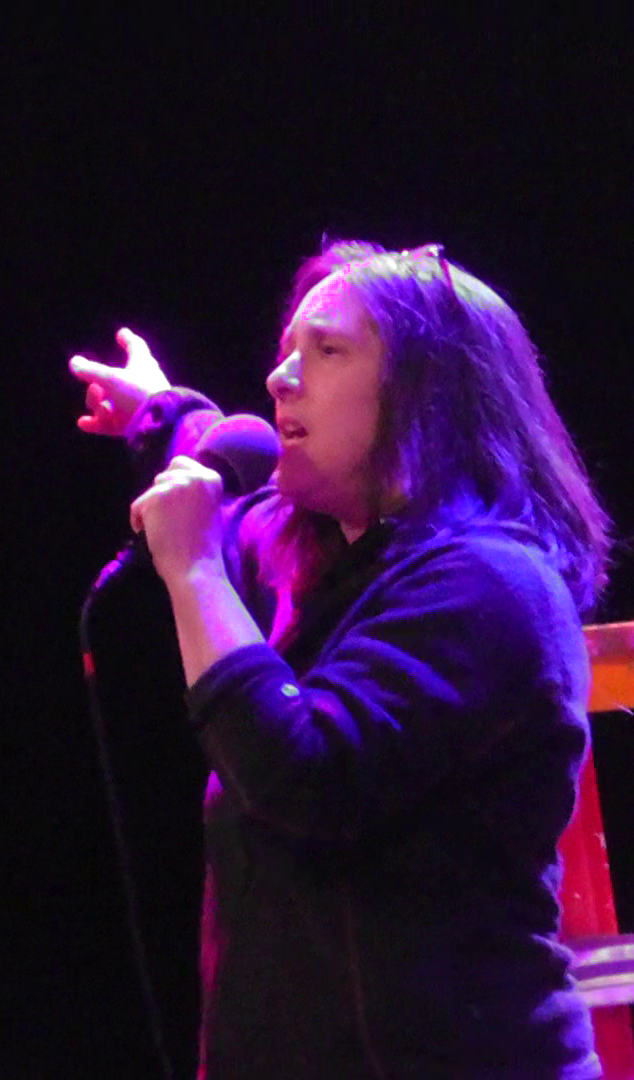
- in 2024

Background information
- Born: Claudia Miriam Gonson; April 5, 1968 (age 58); Boston, Massachusetts, U.S.
- Genre: Indie pop
- Occupations: Musician, singer, songwriter
- Instruments: Piano, drums
- Years active: 1985–present
- Member of: The Magnetic Fields; Future Bible Heroes

Claudia Miriam Gonson (born April 5, 1968) is an American musician best known for her work with The Magnetic Fields. She has been a vocalist as well as performing on the piano or drums. She is also the band's manager, and a licensed therapist.

Gonson met Stephin Merritt in high school in the 1980s, and the pair have worked together ever since.

While in high school at Concord Academy, Gonson performed in her first band, the Zinnias, along with Merritt. The band's material was co-written with John Gage. The band broke up when Gonson left to attend Columbia University. Gonson later returned to the Boston area to attend Harvard University, and joined the group Lazy Susan, which also included Therese Bellino and Shirley Simms.

She has since performed on many of Merritt's albums, including the critically acclaimed 1999 album 69 Love Songs, and has performed with him live for decades, both with The Magnetic Fields and Future Bible Heroes.

Gonson is Merritt's longtime manager. She appears extensively in Strange Powers, the 2009 documentary by Kerthy Fix and Gail O'Hara about Merritt and The Magnetic Fields.

Gonson additionally provides vocals in the band Future Bible Heroes, a musical collaboration between Stephin Merritt and Chris Ewen. The band released three albums. Gonson also coordinates albums with Merritt under the name The 6ths, in which celebrity singers perform Stephin Merritt songs.

Along with her work with Merritt, Gonson has written and performed with Shirley Simms, Michael Hearst, Tanya Donelly and Rick Moody. She sang on Neil Gaiman's song "Bloody Sunrise". She played drums in the Providence, Rhode Island–based band Honeybunch and in the UK band Tender Trap.

In an interview with The Advocate, Gonson remarked: "When we started Magnetic Fields we purposely had one lesbian, one gay guy, one straight woman, and one straight man. The audience could identify with whomever they wanted."

In that interview, Gonson noted that she feels that Merritt's songs are predominantly about "Loneliness, isolation, and the need to be recognized by another person." She believes that if homophobia were not so prevalent, these experiences "would be less rampant instead of being so associated with the gay personality." Gonson believes that many LGBT youth have listened to The Magnetic Fields for "words of wisdom".

In 2010, Gonson gave birth to her daughter Eve.

In 2018, Gonson received her license in Clinical Social Work. She now works as a therapist, as well as continuing as a musician and band manager.
