= Stephin Merritt =

American singer-songwriter (born 1965)

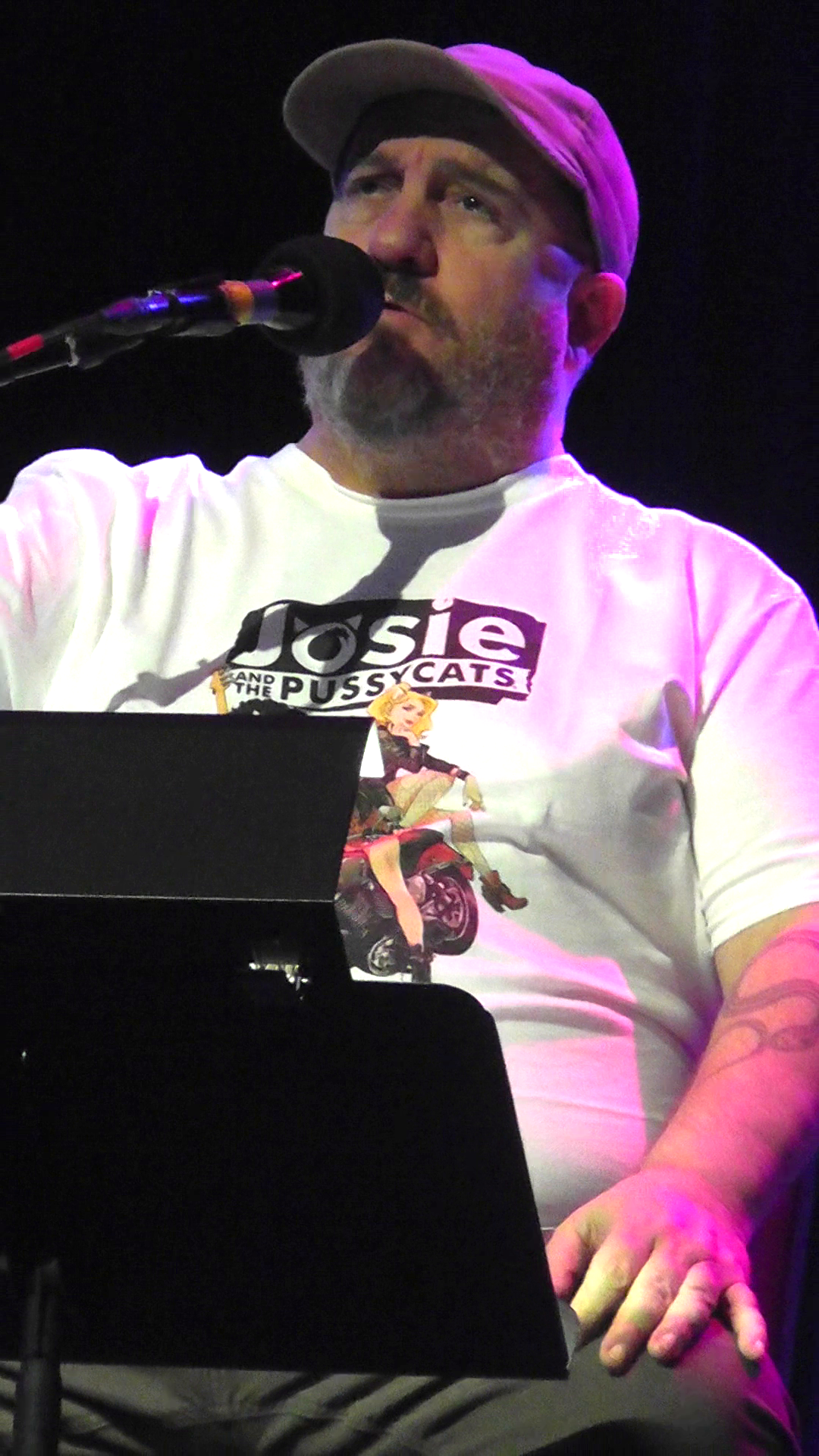
- Merritt at Town Hall in NYC, 2024

Background information
- Born: February 9, 1965 (age 61); Yonkers, New York, U.S.
- Genres: Indie pop; synth-pop
- Occupations: Singer; musician; songwriter
- Instruments: Vocals; guitar; ukulele; keyboards; synthesizers; bouzouki; percussion
- Member of: The Magnetic Fields; The Gothic Archies; Future Bible Heroes
- Formerly of: The 6ths
- Website: houseoftomorrow.com

Stephin Merritt (born February 9, 1965) is an American singer-songwriter and multi-instrumentalist, most notable as the songwriter and principal singer of the bands the Magnetic Fields, the Gothic Archies, and Future Bible Heroes. He is known for his distinctive bass voice.

== Musical projects ==
Merritt created and plays principal roles in the bands the Magnetic Fields, the 6ths, the Gothic Archies and Future Bible Heroes. He briefly used the name The Baudelaire Memorial Orchestra as an attribution for "Scream and Run Away", a song written for Lemony Snicket's A Series of Unfortunate Events, but further music was attributed to the Gothic Archies.

Between 1999 and 2005, he was one-third of the infrequent, live-only ensemble the Three Terrors, with 69 Love Songs's Dudley Klute and LD Beghtol. These performances were themed around French pop music, movie themes (including the title song from Deep Throat), intoxication, and New York City. Kenny Mellman (of Kiki & Herb), Jon DeRosa and others performed with the Three Terrors at these sporadic gala events.

Under his own name, he recorded and released the soundtracks to the films Eban and Charley (2000) and Pieces of April (2003). The soundtrack to the Nickelodeon show The Adventures of Pete & Pete featured many of his songs.

He and director Chen Shi-Zheng collaborated on three pieces of musical theatre: The Orphan of Zhao (2003), Peach Blossom Fan (2004) and My Life as a Fairy Tale (2005). Selected tracks from these works have been released on Nonesuch Records under the title Showtunes.

Merritt wrote and sang "I'm in a Lonely Way" in a television commercial for Volvo that aired in the summer and fall of 2007. He also performed "The Wheels on the Car". He also penned the music and lyrics for a 2009 Off-Broadway stage musical adaptation of Coraline, a novel by Neil Gaiman. In the MCC Theater production, his music was performed by a piano "orchestra" consisting of a traditional piano, a toy piano and a prepared piano.

He produced a score for the silent film 20,000 Leagues Under the Sea that was performed at the Castro Theatre, San Francisco on May 4, 2010, as part of the San Francisco International Film Festival.

In 2014, he released his first book, 101 Two-Letter Words. It is a collection of brief poems, one inspired by each of the two-letter words legal in Scrabble.

== Musical style ==
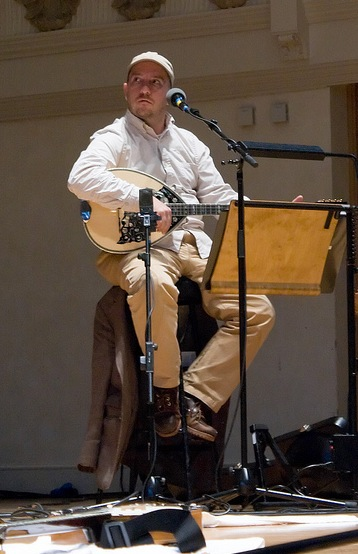
Merritt at Cadogan Hall in London, 2008

Merritt has been acclaimed for his lyrics, which have been described as "romantic", "humorous", and "literary", and he has been called an "insightful lyricist" and a "brilliant wordsmith". At other times, writers have emphasized the unhappiness of his lyrics. In September 2005, an interviewer quoted an anonymous reviewer to Bob Mould that Mould was "the most depressed man in rock." Mould's response was "He's never met Stephin Merritt, obviously."

Unlike most singer-songwriters, Merritt rarely writes autobiographical songs and does not consider songwriting to be emotionally expressive but an exercise in craft, carried out for its own pleasure. His albums generally have a lyrical theme; for instance, The Charm of the Highway Strip is imitation country music. He has stated that he finds writing lyrics with constraints easier. Merritt's preferred method of writing songs involves spending several hours sitting in gay bars "one-third full of cranky old gay men gossiping over thumping disco music" with a glass of cognac, which provides him with inspiration for lyrics.

Critics have also praised his tunes and production, calling him a "master melody-writer" and "an arduous studio rat". Some albums also have musical themes: for instance, the Magnetic Fields album Distortion is feedback-rich mix of noise and pop, and it, i, and Realism make a "trilogy" of records without synthesizers. In contrast, their next album, Love at the Bottom of the Sea, used synthesizers extensively. Throughout Merritt's career, he has changed styles frequently, and uses a wide variety of instruments on his records.

He has described ABBA, Stephen Sondheim, and Phil Spector as influences. Merritt has said he is an avid listener of bubblegum pop, listing Ramones, Kraftwerk, ABBA, and The Troggs as examples of the style. He has expressed a disdain for hip-hop and much of contemporary pop, describing the former as responsible for "more vicious caricatures of African-Americans than they had in the 19th century."

== Personal life ==
Growing up, Merritt used different spellings of his name for different purposes. He used "Stephin" to sort his junk mail, and that eventually became the name he used as a musician. He attended Massachusetts high school The Cambridge School of Weston and briefly attended NYU before moving back to Boston. He has worked as an editor for Spin Magazine and Time Out New York.

Prior to 2013, he had never met his biological father, folk singer Scott Fagan, who had a brief affair with Merritt's mother. The three met at a screening of the film AKA Doc Pomus in 2013. Merritt's relationship with his father is described in the song "'99: Fathers in the Clouds", on the Magnetic Fields album 50 Song Memoir.

Merritt has struggled with epilepsy and depression since his youth, and has a hearing condition known as hyperacusis, which he believes is damage sustained from attending an Einstürzende Neubauten concert at Danceteria. Any sound heard louder than normal begins to "feedback" in his left ear at increasingly louder volumes. This has largely influenced the reserved live setup of the Magnetic Fields, which usually consists of acoustic instruments and little to no percussion. Merritt also wears earplugs during performances, and typically covers his left ear when the audience applauds. When touring the 50 Song Memoir album live, which required a more expanded line-up and amplified sound, the band were able to address this issue by building an elaborate set around Merritt which doubles as an isolation booth.

He was the subject of a documentary, Strange Powers: Stephin Merritt and the Magnetic Fields, which premiered in March 2010.

Merritt is gay and vegan, saying, "I ain't et [sic] an animal since 1983." He has said that he may have Asperger syndrome.

Merritt has struggled with long COVID since contracting the disease in March of 2020, citing it as a direct hindrance on his songwriting. In an interview with Them in 2024, Merritt stated, "I was the first person I knew to get COVID and I haven't actually fully recovered. I have yet to finish a song four years later...I have hundreds, maybe thousands at this point, of fragments that I didn't have before, but I have no new recent songs."

== Solo discography ==
- Eban and Charley (Merge, 2002)
- Pieces of April (Nonesuch, 2003)
- Showtunes (Nonesuch, 2006)
- Obscurities (Merge, 2011)

== See also ==
- List of LGBT people from New York City
