= Lemony Snicket's A Series of Unfortunate Events =

2004 film by Brad Silberling

- Theatrical release poster
- Directed by: Brad Silberling
- Screenplay by: Robert Gordon
- Based on: Book the First: The Bad Beginning, Book the Second: The Reptile Room and Book the Third: The Wide Window by Lemony Snicket (Note: Pen name of author Daniel Handler.)
- Produced by: Walter F. Parkes; Laurie MacDonald; Jim Van Wyck
- Starring: Jim Carrey; Jude Law; Liam Aiken; Emily Browning; Timothy Spall; Catherine O'Hara; Billy Connolly; Cedric the Entertainer; Luis Guzmán; Jennifer Coolidge; Meryl Streep
- Cinematography: Emmanuel Lubezki
- Edited by: Michael Kahn
- Music by: Thomas Newman
- Production companies: Nickelodeon Movies; Parkes/MacDonald Productions
- Distributed by: Paramount Pictures (United States and Canada); DreamWorks Pictures (international)
- Release date: December 17, 2004 (United States)
- Running time: 108 minutes
- Country: United States
- Language: English
- Budget: $140–142 million
- Box office: $211.5 million

Lemony Snicket's A Series of Unfortunate Events (also known as A Series of Unfortunate Events) is a 2004 American adventure dark comedy film directed by Brad Silberling and written by Robert Gordon, based on the first three novels of the book series A Series of Unfortunate Events. It stars Jim Carrey, Liam Aiken, Emily Browning, Timothy Spall, Catherine O'Hara, Billy Connolly, Cedric the Entertainer, Luis Guzmán, Jennifer Coolidge, and Meryl Streep, with Jude Law as the voice of Lemony Snicket.

Nickelodeon Movies purchased the film rights to Daniel Handler's book series in 2000 and began development of a film with Barry Sonnenfeld attached to direct. Handler wrote the screenplay and courted Carrey for Count Olaf. Sonnenfeld left over budget concerns in January 2003 and Brad Silberling took over. Robert Gordon rewrote Handler's script, and principal photography started in November 2003. The film was entirely shot using sound stages and backlots at Paramount Pictures and Downey Studios.

Lemony Snicket's A Series of Unfortunate Events was released theatrically in the United States on December 17, 2004, by Paramount Pictures, with DreamWorks Pictures releasing in other territories. It received positive reviews from critics, with many praising its production values and Carrey's performance. The film grossed $211.5 million on a budget of around $141 million. At the 77th Academy Awards, it won Best Makeup and received nominations for Best Art Direction, Best Costume Design, and Best Original Score.

== Plot ==
Investigator Lemony Snicket documents the whereabouts of the Baudelaire children: 14-year-old inventor Violet, her 12-year-old bibliophile brother Klaus, and their mordacious infant sister Sunny, after they are orphaned when their parents die in a mysterious fire that has destroyed their entire home. Mr. Poe, the family banker, manages their affairs and leaves them in the care of Count Olaf, a nefarious stage actor intent upon obtaining their family fortune, which will remain in the custody of the bank until Violet turns eighteen.

The Baudelaires are severely mistreated by Olaf, who belittles them and forces them to do all his housework. After he legally obtains custody of the children, he attempts to kill them by locking them in his car, which he parks on railway tracks. The Baudelaires divert an oncoming train by building a device to remotely activate the railroad switch, after which Mr. Poe sees the children alone in the car and removes them from Olaf's custody, thinking Olaf was allowing them to drive while underage.

The orphans are taken to live with eccentric and kind herpetologist Dr. Montgomery "Uncle Monty" Montgomery, who plans on bringing the children with him on an expedition to Peru. When Uncle Monty's new assistant "Stephano" arrives, the Baudelaires immediately see that he is Olaf in disguise. They attempt to warn Monty, but he instead suspects Stephano is after his latest discovery, The Incredibly Deadly Viper. The morning they are set to leave for Peru, Monty is found dead, seemingly attacked by the viper, though the children are certain that Olaf murdered him. They are almost placed in Stephano's care by Mr. Poe, but Sunny proves his guilt by showing that the snake is harmless, and Stephano escapes.

Mr. Poe takes the children to Lake Lachrymose to live with their Aunt Josephine, a grammar-obsessed widow with panphobia. Shortly after arriving, they encounter Olaf disguised as a sailor called "Captain Sham", with whom Aunt Josephine becomes immediately besotted. The Baudelaires later find Aunt Josephine missing from her house and an apparent suicide note entrusting them to Captain Sham. Seeing grammatical errors in the note, Klaus deduces that Olaf forced Josephine to write it and the mistakes are clues to her real location. The children sail to the cave where Aunt Josephine has hidden herself and convince her to leave with them. However, they are attacked by deadly leeches; Olaf sails out to rescue the children, but leaves Josephine to be eaten.

When Mr. Poe witnesses Olaf seemingly rescue the Baudelaires, they are placed back in his care, despite the children's protests. Learning that, as their guardian, Olaf would not be entitled to any of their money, he stages a play titled "The Marvelous Marriage," in which he will have Violet play the bride and sign a real marriage certificate in front of a real judge – their neighbor Justice Strauss – which would give Olaf access to the fortune as a legally wedded spouse. Violet refuses to comply, but agrees when Olaf captures Sunny and threatens to kill her if the play is interrupted or she does not agree to marry him.

As the play is performed, Klaus goes to rescue Sunny from the hidden tower in Olaf's house. There, he discovers a large window with a set of lenses that can focus and alter the rays of the sun, and realizes Olaf used it to set fire to the Baudelaire mansion. Violet attempts to escape the marriage through a legal loophole by signing the certificate with her non-dominant left hand; Olaf catches on, forces her sign it with her right hand, and tauntingly reveals his true intentions to everyone. Klaus uses the window and lenses to burn the marriage certificate, allowing the crowd to arrest Olaf. Olaf is sentenced to suffer every hardship that he forced upon the Baudelaires, but mysteriously disappears before he can do so.

Before leaving for their next home, Violet, Klaus, and Sunny visit the charred remains of their old family home one final time. A lost letter from their parents is finally delivered; inside is a spyglass announcing their family's secret society, V.F.D., of which Uncle Monty and Aunt Josephine were both members. Snicket concludes his documentation and leaves it in a clock tower for his publisher to find.

== Cast ==
- Jim Carrey as Count Olaf, a villainous stage actor and master of disguise who lusts after the Baudelaire family fortune.
  - Stephano, Count Olaf's first disguise who pretends to be Dr. Montgomery's new assistant, he later kills Montgomery and tries to frame The Incredibly Deadly Viper but fails.
  - Captain Sham, a peg leg sea captain and Count Olaf's second disguise. He makes Josephine give the Baudelaires to him and later kills Josephine by making her fall into the lake with leeches.
- Emily Browning as Violet Baudelaire, a brilliant inventor. She is the eldest of the Baudelaire siblings and makes inventions out of everyday items.
- Liam Aiken as Klaus Baudelaire, an intelligent and kind-hearted bibliophile. He is the middle child of the Baudelaire siblings and uses his encyclopedic knowledge to get them out of trouble.
- Kara and Shelby Hoffman as Sunny Baudelaire, the youngest Baudelaire sibling. She is an infant with four very sharp teeth. Her dialogue is mostly subtitled as she communicates via unintelligible babbling.
- Timothy Spall as Arthur Poe, the Baudelaire family banker who informs the Baudelaire children of the fire and manages their affairs in its aftermath.
- Billy Connolly as Dr. Montgomery Montgomery, an eccentric but kindly herpetologist and the Baudelaires' uncle and temporary guardian.
- Meryl Streep as Josephine Anwhistle, a paranoid, OCD-stricken grammar stickler and the Baudelaires' aunt and temporary guardian.
- Catherine O'Hara as Justice Strauss, Count Olaf's kind neighbor and a judge.
- Jamie Harris as the Hook-Handed Man, Count Olaf's main minion.
- Luis Guzmán as the Bald-Headed Man, one of Count Olaf's minions.
- Craig Ferguson as the Person of Indeterminate Gender, one of Count Olaf's minions.
- Jennifer Coolidge and Jane Adams as the White-Faced Women, two of Count Olaf's minions.
- Cedric the Entertainer as the Constable, a local detective who is skeptical of Count Olaf.
- Bob Clendenin as a grocery clerk.
- Lenny Clarke as a gruff grocer.
- Deborah Theaker as Mrs. Poe, Mr. Poe's wife.
- Rick Heinrichs and Helena Bonham Carter (both uncredited) as Bertrand and Beatrice Baudelaire, Klaus, Violet, and Sunny's deceased parents.
- Dustin Hoffman (uncredited) as a Critic who attends Count Olaf's The Marvelous Marriage.
- Jane Lynch (uncredited) as a realtor.
- Gilbert Gottfried (uncredited) as the voice of the Aflac Duck, who appeared in a cameo.
- Jude Law as the voice of Lemony Snicket, an introverted writer and the narrator of the story. Background actor James Henderson plays Snicket physically.

Daniel Handler, the writer of the Lemony Snicket stories, appears as a photographer.

=== Notes ===
Handler initially viewed Count Olaf as a James Mason type. Carrey was not familiar with the book series when he was cast, but he became a fan of the series. "Handler's books are just a bold and original way to tell a children's story," he said. Carrey was also attracted to the role despite self-parody concerns. Silberling was open to Carrey's idea of improvisation for various scenes, especially the Stephano and Captain Sham alter egos. To make his prosthetic makeup more comfortable and easier to apply, Carrey shaved his head bald for the part. His inspiration for Olaf's voice was combining the voices of Orson Welles and Bela Lugosi.

Emily Browning was cast as Violet Baudelaire when she auditioned at a casting call in Australia. She was sent Handler's original script when Barry Sonnenfeld was planning to direct, and screen tested for the part using an English accent. Browning became a fan of the books after reading Handler's original script. The actress was not cast until Silberling took over, then her character's accent was changed to American.

== Production ==
=== Development ===
Nickelodeon Movies purchased the film rights to the A Series of Unfortunate Events novel series in May 2000. Paramount Pictures, owner of Nickelodeon Movies, agreed to co-finance, along with Scott Rudin. Various directors, including Terry Gilliam and Roman Polanski, were interested in making the film. One of Daniel Handler's favorite candidates was Guy Maddin. In June 2002, it was announced that Barry Sonnenfeld was hired to direct. He was chosen because he previously collaborated with Rudin and because of his directing style from The Addams Family, Addams Family Values and Get Shorty. Sonnenfeld referred to the Lemony Snicket novels as his favorite children's stories. Sonnenfeld hired Handler to write the script with the intention of making Lemony Snicket a musical, and cast Jim Carrey as Count Olaf in September 2002.

The film suffered setbacks in development in December 2002. Rudin left Unfortunate Events over budget concerns. While Sonnenfeld and Carrey remained, Sonnenfeld admitted he was skeptical of Paramount's $100 million budget. Paramount decided that changing the shoot from Hollywood to Wilmington, North Carolina, would be less expensive. The April 2003 start date was also pushed back. Paramount eventually settled the situation in January 2003 by enlisting help from DreamWorks Pictures to co-finance the film, but Sonnenfeld vacated the director's position. Rudin and Sonnenfeld had no involvement with the film afterward, but were credited as executive producers. Carrey remained with approval over the hiring of the next director.

Very little of what I wrote is in the film, which I actually think is appropriate being as that I was writing it for Barry Sonnenfeld. It's a director's medium and Brad Silberling makes entirely different films from Barry Sonnenfeld. I wasn't filled with resentment because they didn't use it [my script], I was just disappointed because I'd worked a long time [on it] and Scott Rudin, Barry Sonnenfeld and I were all sort of ready to go, along with Jim Carrey, with the film that we had. So it was sort of a long, rocky, journey. But that's all [in the past].

— Series author Daniel Handler

Brad Silberling signed on to direct in February 2003. He was not familiar with the series when he was first approached. He quickly read the first three novels and was excited that "Hollywood was taking a chance to put over $100 million to adapt these inventive children's books onto screen". Handler, who wrote eight drafts of the script for Sonnenfeld, was replaced by Robert Gordon in May 2003. Handler approved of the changes that were made to his screenplay. "I was offered credit on the film for screenwriting by the Writers Guild of America", Handler continued, "but I didn't take it because I didn't write it. I felt like it would be an insult to the guy who did."

=== Filming ===
Filming was set to begin in October 2003, but was pushed back. Principal photography commenced on November 10, 2003, using the sound stages and backlot at Paramount Studios in Hollywood. Silberling avoided using too many digital or chroma key effects because he wanted the younger actors to feel as if they were working in a realistic environment. Olaf's mansion occupied two sound stages, while the graveyard and the ruins of the Baudelaire mansion were constructed on the Paramount back lot. After 21 weeks of shooting at Paramount, production then moved to Downey Studios, a former NASA facility in Downey, California, for eight more weeks. Downey housed the circular railroad crossing set complete with forced perspective scenery, as well as a newly constructed water tank complete with over one million gallons of water. The water tank was instrumental in filming scenes set at Briny Beach, Lake Lachrymose, Damocles Dock and Curdled Cave. Filming for A Series of Unfortunate Events wrapped on May 29, 2004.

=== Design ===
Some scenery was designed using forced perspective techniques, combined with matte paintings.

Silberling, production designer Rick Heinrichs and costume designer Colleen Atwood all aimed for the film's setting to be ambiguous, giving it a "timeless" feel. Heinrichs also added steampunk designs to the period. To contribute to the setting, Silberling hired Emmanuel Lubezki as the cinematographer because he was impressed with the trio's work on Sleepy Hollow.

Lubezki compared the cinematic similarities to Sleepy Hollow, notably the monochromatic look of both films. He also chose a specific color palette backdrop for A Series of Unfortunate Events. "The story is very episodic, so we picked a different color scheme for each section. For example, Count Olaf's house has a lot of greens, blacks and grays; the house of Uncle Monty has a lot of greens and browns and a bit of yellow; and the house of Aunt Josephine has blues and blacks." The railroad crossing set was constructed on a cyclorama, which was the most ambitious set piece for the art department on using elements of "in house" special effects and matte paintings.

=== Visual effects ===
Industrial Light & Magic (ILM), supervised by Stefen Fangmeier, created the film's 505 visual effects shots. The filmmakers used as few digital effects as possible, though the train and smoke for the railroad crossing scene were created entirely by computer animation. ILM also used color grading techniques for the Lake Lachrymose scene, which required complete animation for the leeches. The digital animators studied footage of the 2003 Atlantic hurricane season to accurately depict Hurricane Herman, which was ILM's most ambitious use of computer-generated imagery (CGI) for the film. Nexus Productions designed the opening "Littlest Elf" animated sequence by modeling it after stop-motion animation and completing it with computer animation. The snakes at Monty's house were a combination of real snakes and animatronics. The animatronics, primarily the Incredibly Deadly Viper, were used as reference models that ILM later enhanced using CGI. Because working with infants was sometimes risky in producing a film, four scenes involving Sunny Baudelaire required CGI with motion capture technology. Among these are the shot of Sunny hanging on to a table by her teeth, catching a spindle with her mouth and the scene where she is entangled with the Incredibly Deadly Viper. Animation supervisor Colin Brady used his baby daughter for motion capture recording. Kevin Yagher designed a remote-controlled animatronic of Sunny.

== Release ==
=== Marketing ===
In October 2002, Nickelodeon Movies hired Activision (which actually had a partnership with DreamWorks) to create the film's tie-in video game. The agreement also included options for sequels. Silberling delivered his first cut of the film to the studio in August 2004. Fearing his original version was "too dark", Paramount and DreamWorks conducted test screenings. The film was then reedited over family-friendliness concerns. Given its December release, the film's marketing campaign was criticized as a deliberately anti-holiday comedy with taglines like "Taking the cheer out of Christmas" and "Mishaps. Misadventures. Mayhem. Oh Joy." The premiere of Lemony Snicket's A Series of Unfortunate Events was held at the Cinerama Dome on December 13, 2004. A 20,000-square-foot (1,900 m^{2}) tent display on Vine Street was decorated with pieces from the film's sets.

=== Home media ===
Lemony Snicket's A Series of Unfortunate Events was released on DVD and VHS on April 26, 2005. A Portuguese-labeled All-Region Blu-ray was released in 2012 and then an American Region A Blu-ray was released on September 9, 2014. The film was re-released on DVD on January 24, 2017.

== Reception ==
=== Box office ===
Lemony Snicket's A Series of Unfortunate Events grossed $118.6 million in the United States and Canada and $92.8 million in other territories for a worldwide total of $211.5 million, against a budget of $140 million.

The film was released in the United States and Canada on December 17, 2004, on 4,400 screens at 3,620 theaters, earning $30.1 million in its opening weekend and finishing first at the box office. In its second weekend, the film fell to second behind Meet the Fockers, grossing $12.6 million. It was the highest-grossing film under the Nickelodeon Movies banner until The Last Airbender surpassed it.

=== Critical response ===
On Rotten Tomatoes, the film received an approval rating of 72% based on 160 reviews, with an average rating of 6.7/10. The site's critical consensus reads, "Although it softens the nasty edges of its source material, Lemony Snicket's A Series of Unfortunate Events is a gothic visual treat, and it features a hilariously manic turn from Jim Carrey as the evil Count Olaf." On Metacritic, the film has a score of 62 out of 100, based on 37 critics, indicating "generally favorable" reviews. Audiences polled by CinemaScore gave the film an average grade of "B+" on an A+ to F scale.

Robert K. Elder of the Chicago Tribune praised Rick Heinrichs's production design and Carrey's balanced performance as a scene stealer, calling the film "exceptionally clever, hilariously gloomy and bitingly subversive." Desson Thomson of The Washington Post reasoned over a fellow film-goer's characterization of Count Olaf, "Olaf is a humorless villain in the book. He's not amusing like Carrey at all. To which I would counter: If you can't let Carrey be Carrey, put someone boring and less expensive in the role. In his various disguises he's rubbery, inventive and improvisationally inspired. I particularly liked his passing imitation of a dinosaur." Ty Burr, in The Boston Globe, observed, "Director Brad Silberling has essentially made a Tim Burton movie without the weird shafts of adolescent pain. At the same time, Silberling's not a hack like Chris Columbus, and Snicket has more zip and inspired filmcraft than the first two Harry Potter films. The film's no masterpiece, but at least you're in the hands of people who know what they're doing. The movie, like the books, flatters children's innate sense that the world is not a perfect place and that anyone who insists otherwise is trying to sell you something. How you deal with the cognitive dissonance of a $125 million Hollywood picture telling you this is up to you. At least there are no Lemony Snicket Happy Meals. Yet."

Internet reviewer James Berardinelli felt that "the film is first and foremost a fantasy, but there are dark currents running just beneath the surface. I give Silberling credit for not allowing them to swallow the film. Lemony Snicket's A Series of Unfortunate Events manages to remain witty throughout." Roger Ebert gave a mixed review: "Jim Carrey is over the top as Count Olaf, but I suppose a character named Count Olaf is over the top by definition. I liked the film, but I'll tell you what. I think this one is a tune-up for the series, a trial run in which they figure out what works and what needs to be tweaked. The original Spider-Man was a disappointment, but the same team came back and made Spider-Man 2, the best superhero movie ever made." Scott Foundas of Variety gave a negative review, criticizing the filmmakers for sacrificing the story line in favor of visual elements such as set design and cinematography. He wrote, "A Series of Unfortunate Events suggests what Mary Poppins might have looked like had Tim Burton directed it. Not surprisingly, Burton's longtime production designer Rick Heinrichs was responsible for the sets, while ace Emmanuel Lubezki (Burton's Sleepy Hollow) contributed the expressionistic lighting schemes."

=== Awards and nominations ===
Award	Category	Recipient	Result	Ref.
Academy Awards	Best Art Direction	Rick Heinrichs and Cheryl Carasik	Nominated	
Academy Awards	Best Costume Design	Colleen Atwood	Nominated	
Academy Awards	Best Makeup	Valli O'Reilly and Bill Corso	Won	
Academy Awards	Best Original Score	Thomas Newman	Nominated	
Visual Effects Society	Outstanding Performance by an Animated; Character in a Live Action Motion Picture	Rick O'Connor, Martin Murphy, Indira Guettieri, Sam Breach	Nominated	
Saturn Awards	Best Fantasy Film		Nominated	
Saturn Awards	Best Make-Up	Valli O'Reilly and Bill Corso	Nominated	
Saturn Awards	Best DVD Special Edition Release		Nominated	

== Canceled franchise and reboot ==
=== Canceled film series ===
Paramount Pictures and Nickelodeon Movies hoped that the film would become a series like the Harry Potter film series. Carrey thought his character would be good as the basis for a film franchise since each installment would feature new disguises for Count Olaf allowing him to dive into a new role each time, though he said he didn't "have a deal" for a sequel. In May 2005, producer Laurie MacDonald said "Lemony Snicket is still something Paramount is interested in pursuing and we're going to be talking with them more."

In October 2008, Handler said that "a sequel does seem to be in the works. Paramount has had quite a few corporate shakeups, which has led to many a delay. Of course, many, many plans in Hollywood come to naught, but I'm assured that another film will be made. Someday. Perhaps." In June 2009, Silberling confirmed he still talked about the project with Handler, and suggested the sequel be a stop motion film, with each film in a new medium, due to the young lead actors having grown too old to continue their roles, saying, "In an odd way, the best thing you could do is actually have Lemony Snicket say to the audience, 'Okay, we pawned the first film off as a mere dramatization with actors. Now, I'm afraid I'm going to have to show you the real thing.'"

=== Television series ===
In November 2014, Netflix announced its plans for a television adaptation of the entire novel series. The series stars Neil Patrick Harris as Olaf, Malina Weissman, Louis Hynes and Presley Smith as the Baudelaire siblings, with Patrick Warburton as Lemony Snicket. The series, also titled A Series of Unfortunate Events, premiered on January 13, 2017. The first season consisted of eight episodes, and adapts the first four books of the series. Actress Catherine O'Hara was the only actor from the film to appear in both the film and the series; albeit as different characters. A Series of Unfortunate Events season two was released on March 30, 2018, and contains 10 episodes, adapting books five through nine of the novel series. The third and final season was released on January 1, 2019, and adapts the four remaining books in seven episodes.

== Video game ==
A video game based on the film was released in 2004 by Activision for the PlayStation 2, GameCube, Xbox, Game Boy Advance, and Microsoft Windows. The player plays as all three orphans at points in the game.
