= The Wide Window =

2000 children's novel

- First edition cover
- Author: Lemony Snicket (pen name of Daniel Handler)
- Illustrator: Brett Helquist
- Cover artist: Brett Helquist
- Language: English
- Series: A Series of Unfortunate Events
- Genre: Gothic fiction; Absurdist fiction; Mystery
- Publisher: HarperCollins
- Publication date: February 25, 2000
- Publication place: United States
- Media type: Print (hardback & paperback)
- Pages: 214
- ISBN: 0-06-440768-3
- OCLC: 41355668
- Dewey Decimal: Fic 21
- LC Class: PZ7.S6795 Wi 2000
- Preceded by: The Reptile Room
- Followed by: The Miserable Mill

Book the Third: The Wide Window is the third novel of the children's book series A Series of Unfortunate Events by Lemony Snicket. In this novel, the Baudelaire orphans live with their aunt Josephine, who is seemingly scared of everything. The book was published on February 25, 2000 by HarperCollins and illustrated by Brett Helquist.

== Plot ==
Mr. Poe puts the Baudelaire orphans, Klaus Baudelaire, Sunny Baudelaire and Violet Baudelaire under the care of Aunt Josephine, who lives in a house atop a hill overlooking Lake Lachrymose, a lake so large that hurricanes have occurred in that area. Aunt Josephine is afraid of everything from cooking food (as the stove might explode) to her welcome mat. However, she loves grammar, and her library is filled with books about the grammar of the English language. It also has a wide window that overlooks the lake.

While helping Aunt Josephine in the grocery store, the Baudelaires run into a sailor named "Captain Sham", who they realize is Count Olaf in disguise. Aunt Josephine declines to believe this due to Captain Sham's charming personality. That night, the children hear a crash and find that Aunt Josephine had jumped out of the wide window, and has left a note for them informing them that Captain Sham will be their new guardian.

The note has many grammar errors, but Mr. Poe discovers that it is indeed Aunt Josephine’s handwriting, not a forgery by Count Olaf. He takes them to dinner with him at the Anxious Clown, a cheap and grimy restaurant with an over-enthusiastic waiter named Larry. Needing a distraction to come up with a strategy, Violet puts peppermints that Poe gave them when they got there in her own food and that of Klaus and Sunny. Allergic, they break into hives, forcing Count Olaf to allow them to return to their aunt's house. Klaus discovers that, though the note is in Aunt Josephine's handwriting, the message 'Curdled Cave' is encoded by the errors. As they finish decoding the note, Hurricane Herman hits and the house falls into the lake.

As the hurricane rages, the Baudelaire orphans plan to get to Curdled Cave by stealing a boat from Captain Sham's boat store near Lake Lachrymose. There, they encounter one of Count Olaf's henchpeople, a large person of undetermined gender. They endure the storm and reach the Curdled Cave, where Aunt Josephine reveals that Count Olaf forced her to write the note, but she decided to fake her suicide by breaking the Wide Window. She was hoping that the four of them would live in the cave together, but the orphans convince her to go to the authorities.

While traveling back, Lachrymose leeches attempt to suck their blood; the leeches smelled food in Aunt Josephine's stomach, as she ate a banana less than one hour before. They signal for help, only for Count Olaf to arrive on a ship. After leaving Aunt Josephine to be eaten by the leeches, Olaf brings the children back to the shore. Aunt Josephine's note is soaked and unreadable, but Sunny reveals Olaf's ruse to Mr. Poe by biting Count Olaf's fake wooden peg in half, revealing his leg and eye tattoo. Unfortunately, he and his henchperson escape again, leaving Mr. Poe to once again try to find a home for the orphans.

== Foreshadowing ==
In Chapter 13, it is mentioned that after the Baudelaires are sent to a boarding school, two fishermen discover Aunt Josephine's life jackets in tatters, floating in Lake Lachrymose. This detail foreshadows the Baudelaires’ subsequent enrollment at Prufrock Preparatory School in The Austere Academy.

On the side of a building in the book's final picture hangs a sign in the shape of a pair of glasses with a pair of squinting eyes, referencing Dr. Orwell's office in The Miserable Mill.

== Cultural references and literary allusions ==
- The name Damocles Dock presumably alludes to the legendary Greek figure Damocles who had a sword dangling over his head. The picture at the beginning of the book shows the three Baudelaires standing on Damocles Dock. In the archway at the entrance to the dock is a sword dangling over their heads.
- In the previous book of the series, the endnote references the Café Kafka, a reference to the Austrian-Hungarian author Franz Kafka. One of Kafka's short stories, "Josephine the Singer, or the Mouse Folk", features Josephine, the only mouse that can sing. In the short story, Josephine's music sounds like whistling if heard from the wrong angle, which may be a reference to Aunt Josephine's late husband's ability to whistle with crackers in his mouth (along with the Baudelaire orphans' mother). Josephine's last name was Anwhistle, making her husband Ike Anwhistle ("I can whistle").
- Lachrymose (Lake Lachrymose) means "given to or causing tears".

== Special editions ==
=== The Wide Window; or, Disappearance! ===
The Wide Window; or, Disappearance! is a paperback re-release of The Wide Window, designed to mimic Victorian penny dreadfuls. It was released on September 4, 2007. The book includes seven new illustrations, and the third part of a serial supplement entitled The Cornucopian Cavalcade, which features a 13-part comic by Michael Kupperman entitled The Spoily Brats, an advice column written by Lemony Snicket, and, as in The Bad Beginning; or, Orphans! and The Reptile Room; or, Murder!, (the final) part of a story by Stephen Leacock entitled Q: A Psychic Pstory of the Psupernatural. This edition was the last of the paperback rereleases of the series - there have not been any more of these as of December 2013.

== Translations ==
- Croatian: "Široki Prozor"
- Czech: "Široké okno", Egmont, 2001, ISBN 80-7186-184-7
- Dutch: "Het Rampzalige Raam", (The Catastrophic Window), Huberte Vriesendorp, 2006, ISBN 978-90-216-1540-0
- Finnish: "Avara akkuna", (The Wide Window), ISBN 951-0-26518-7
- Greek: "Το Φαρδύ Παράθυρο", Ελληνικά Γράμματα
- Indonesian: "Jendela Janggal", (The Weird Window), Gramedia, 2003, ISBN 979-22-0567-5, 10603021
- Japanese "大きな窓に気をつけろ" (Beware the Big Window) ISBN 4-7942-1124-4
- Korean: "눈물샘 호수의 비밀" (Secrets of the Lacrimal Lake), Munhakdongnae Publishing Co, Ltd., 2002, ISBN 978-89-546-0836-7
- Norwegian: Iglene i innsjøen (The Leeches in the Lake), Karoline Melli, Cappelen Damm, 2001, ISBN 9788202204259
- Polish : "Ogromne okno" (The Giant Window)
- Brazilian Portuguese: "O Lago das Sanguessugas" (The Lake of Leeches), Cia. das Letras, 2000,ISBN 85-359-0171-X
- Russian: "Огромное окно", Azbuka, 2003, ISBN 5-352-00431-7
- Spanish: "El ventanal", Montena, 2004, ISBN 0-307-20937-7
- Thai: "บ้านประหลาด", Nanmeebooks Teen, 2002, ISBN 97-447-2802-7
- Swedish: "Den Sorgsna Sjön" (The Sad Lake), Richters, 2003, ISBN 91-7711-336-5

== Adaptations ==
Elements of The Wide Window were featured in the 2004 film adaptation of the first three books in the series, Lemony Snicket's A Series of Unfortunate Events. The book was adapted into the fifth and sixth episodes of the first season of the television series adaptation produced by Netflix. In the film, Meryl Streep portrays Aunt Josephine, while Alfre Woodard portrays the character in the TV series.

== See also ==
- Violet Baudelaire
- Klaus Baudelaire
- Sunny Baudelaire
- Count Olaf
- Arthur Poe
