= The Slippery Slope =

2003 children's novel

- Author: Lemony Snicket (pen name of Daniel Handler)
- Illustrator: Brett Helquist
- Cover artist: Brett Helquist
- Language: English
- Series: A Series of Unfortunate Events
- Genre: Gothic fiction Absurdist fiction Mystery
- Publisher: HarperCollins
- Publication date: September 23, 2003
- Publication place: United States
- Media type: Print (hardback & paperback)
- Pages: 337
- ISBN: 0-06-441013-7
- OCLC: 52602720
- Dewey Decimal: Fic 22
- LC Class: PZ7.S6795 Sl 2003
- Preceded by: The Carnivorous Carnival
- Followed by: The Grim Grotto

Book the Tenth: The Slippery Slope is the tenth novel in the children's novel series A Series of Unfortunate Events by Lemony Snicket. It was illustrated by Brett Helquist and published on September 23, 2003. In the novel, Violet and Klaus Baudelaire make their way up the Mortmain Mountains to rescue their sister Sunny from Count Olaf and his troupe. They meet Quigley Quagmire, a character who they thought to be dead, and visit the headquarters of a mysterious organization called "V.F.D." They are reunited with Sunny and manage to escape from Olaf. The book has received positive reviews and been translated into several different languages.

== Plot ==
Continuing on from The Carnivorous Carnival, Violet and Klaus are in a caravan rolling down the Mortmain Mountains. Sunny is trapped in a car with Count Olaf, Esmé, and the theater troupe, which now includes the carnival's henchpeople. From materials in the caravan, Violet frantically constructs a drag chute and instructs Klaus to mix together sticky foodstuffs, which he pours on the tires. The caravan comes to a halt at the very edge of the cliff, and tumbles off when Violet and Klaus step out, leaving them with only a few clothes. They travel up the mountain and are attacked by Snow Gnats, so they take cover in a cave. Snow Scouts, led by Bruce (the man who collected Uncle Monty's reptiles from The Reptile Room), are occupying the cave, and Carmelita Spats (a student from The Austere Academy) is to be crowned Snow Queen. A masked Snow Scout communicates with the Baudelaires with "V.F.D." phrases such as "very fun day". At night, the scout wakes Violet and Klaus and leads them up a chimney. He calls it a "Vertical Flame Diversion" and at the end they reach a "Vernacularly Fastened Door", which allows the trio through once they solve three literary questions.

Meanwhile, Olaf and his troupe have reached the summit of Mount Fraught, and Sunny is forced to do their chores. She sleeps in a casserole dish in the car trunk. The next morning, she prepares breakfast for the troupe, but Olaf is furious at the cold meal. Two more villains arrive, described as "the man with a beard but no hair" and "the woman with hair but no beard". Their aura frightens even Olaf, and they announce that they have burned down the nearby V.F.D. headquarters. They give Olaf the Snicket File, without the last page, and give Esmé a green object called a Verdant Flammable Device. Sunny uses the device to create smoke, which she hopes her siblings will see.

Violet, Klaus, and the masked Snow Scout are now in the ruins of the V.F.D. headquarters. The Snow Scout is Quigley, the Quagmire triplet whose siblings thought had perished in the fire that killed their parents. He explains that during the fire his mother hid him in an underground passage, which led to Uncle Monty's house. He learned about V.F.D. from Jacques Snicket shortly after the Baudelaires departed from Monty's house and traveled to find his siblings. Violet, Klaus, and Quigley then see green smoke from the mountain above them, and Violet constructs a device from a ukulele and forks, which can be used to climb the frozen waterfall. She travels up with Quigley, and eventually they come upon a ledge in the waterfall. It is suspected and hinted at by the author that the two share a kiss. They continue on and find Sunny, who wants to stay behind and spy on Olaf. Violet reluctantly agrees, and climbs back down with Quigley.

In the V.F.D. library, Klaus has found a page from a code book explaining "Verbal Fridge Dialogue", and from the contents of a fridge in the headquarters, he learns that there is a meeting in the "last safe place" on Thursday. When Violet and Quigley arrive, the three plot to trap Esmé in order to exchange her for Sunny. They dig a pit overnight and lure Esmé down with a Verdant Flammable Device of Quigley's, but after becoming uncomfortable with the idea of kidnapping, they tell Esmé to avoid the pit. Wearing masks, they climb back up the stream with the toboggan that Esmé rode down on.

Klaus pretends to be a volunteer who will trade the location of the sugar bowl for Sunny. As Olaf and Esmé argue, the Snow Scout troupe arrive and Carmelita is crowned False Spring Queen. Olaf and Esmé invite her to join the troupe. Though the children warn them, the Snow Scouts are ensnared in a net by eagles that fly away with them. Olaf orders Sunny to be thrown off the mountain, but the White-Faced Women refuse and quit the troupe. Olaf tries to throw Sunny off the mountain, but she is hiding behind the car, not sleeping in the casserole dish. The three Baudelaires and Quigley escape down the stream with the toboggan, but the ice has now cracked enough to shatter the waterfall and separate Quigley from the Baudelaires.

== Foreshadowing ==
The last picture of The Slippery Slope shows Violet, wearing a poncho, and Sunny on a wooden raft, floating down the Stricken Stream. Violet is holding onto Klaus, who is in the water, and Quigley is seen upstream, holding on to another wooden raft, and holding his commonplace notebook up in the air. In a reference to the Medusoid mycelium, the fungus featured in The Grim Grotto, one can see mushrooms growing on the cliffs of the Mortmain Mountains.

== Publication ==
The book was released on September 23, 2003, with an initial print run of one million copies. No advance copies were produced for reviewers. As promotion, Handler appeared at book signings in New Jersey, California, Washington and Minnesota under the guise of being author Lemony Snicket's "official representative".

The book's sales of 900,000 copies in 2003 placed it second in Publishers Weekly's list of bestselling children's hardback books, following Harry Potter and the Order of the Phoenix. Overall sales of A Series of Unfortunate Events books increased from 3.3 million the previous year to 3.8 million. In August 2006, the magazine reported that there were two million copies of The Slippery Slope in print.

== Analysis ==
The book features dark humour. It continues the Baudelaires' personal development, with Sunny uttering her first sentence, "I am not a baby". The children show moral development in their decision not to trap Esmé. The narrator also hints at a relationship developing between Violet and Quigley. Snicket omits description of an interaction between the pair "to give them a bit of privacy", which provides more information than it conceals, indicating that the interaction was romantic. Olaf's troupe also demonstrate character development, the white-faced women refusing to co-operate with Olaf's plan to throw Sunny off a mountain. The book ends on a cliffhanger.

== Reception ==
The book entered the Wall Street Journal bestsellers list for fiction on October 3, 2003, at position #1, remaining in the list for twelve weeks up to December 19.

Krista Tokarz of School Library Journal praised the novel as a "fast-paced continuation of the series" with "well-developed characters". Stephanie Zvirin of Booklist gave The Slippery Slope a positive review, saying that the author "hasn't lost his sense of the absurd or his momentum". Zvirin complimented the "joyful wordplay and the quirky imaginative touches", describing the characters as "true to form, ridiculous and fun" and noting that Snicket's "wry telling is pitch-perfect". David Abrams of January Magazine gave the book a positive review, saying "the delight in The Slippery Slope and others in this series is found in the way the author jauntily jots his jokes across the page." Norah Piehl from Kidsreads wrote that the book "has all of the tongue-in-cheek wit that makes the series enjoyable for kids and adults alike", and that "Snicket really outdoes himself".

== Translations ==
- Spanish Castilian: "La Pendiente Resbaladiza" (The Slippery Slope)
- Brazilian Portuguese: "O Escorregador de Gelo" (The Slide of Ice), Cia. das Letras, 2004, ISBN 85-359-0575-8
- Finnish: "Luikurin liuku" (The Fraudster's Slide), WSOY, 2003, ISBN 951-0-30679-7
- Italian: "La scivolosa scarpata" (The Slippery Slope), Salani, 2006, ISBN 978-88-8451-635-0
- Greek: "Η Ολισθηρή Οροσειρά" (The Sliding Mountain Range)
- Japanese: "つるつるスロープ" (The Slippery Slope), Soshisha, 2006, ISBN 978-4-7942-1480-5
- Norwegian: "Den frosne fossen" (The Frozen Waterfall), Tor Edvin Dahl, Cappelen Damm, 2004, ISBN 9788202234294
- Russian: "Скользкий склон" (The Slippery Slope), Azbuka, 2005, ISBN 5-352-01599-8
- French: "La Pente Glissante" (The Slippery Slope)
- Polish: "Zjezdne zbocze" (The Slippery Slope)
- Thai: "หน้าผาวิปโยค", Nanmeebooks Teen, 2004, ISBN 9749656865

== Adaptation ==
The book was adapted into the first and second episodes of the third season of the television series adaptation produced by Netflix. In this version, Bruce is replaced by a pushover woman named Brucie. The freaks from Caligari Carnival also get killed off (thus omitting their role in the adaptation of The Penultimate Peril).
