= A Series of Unfortunate Events (TV series) =

American streaming television series

- Season 1 promotional poster
- Genre: Black comedy; Drama
- Based on: A Series of Unfortunate Events by Lemony Snicket
- Starring: Neil Patrick Harris; Patrick Warburton; Malina Weissman; Louis Hynes; K. Todd Freeman; Presley Smith; Dylan Kingwell; Avi Lake; Lucy Punch
- Theme music composer: Nick Urata; Daniel Handler
- Opening theme: "Look Away" by Neil Patrick Harris
- Composers: James Newton Howard; Sven Faulconer; Chris Bacon; Nick Urata; Jim Dooley
- Country of origin: United States
- Original language: English
- No. of seasons: 3
- No. of episodes: 25

Production
- Executive producers: Cindy Holland (season 1); Brian Wright (season 1); Ted Biaselli (season 1); Daniel Handler; Barry Sonnenfeld; John Weber; Frank Siracusa (season 1); Neil Patrick Harris (seasons 2–3); Rose Lam (seasons 2–3)
- Producers: Neil Patrick Harris (season 1); Joe Tracz (season 3); Rand Geiger (season 3)
- Production locations: Vancouver, British Columbia, Canada
- Cinematography: Bernard Couture; Todd Elyzen
- Editors: Stuart Bass; Skip Macdonald; Steve Welch
- Running time: 36–64 minutes
- Production companies: Paramount Television; What is the Question?; Sonnenfeld Productions, Inc.

Original release
- Network: Netflix
- Release: January 13, 2017 – January 1, 2019

A Series of Unfortunate Events is an American black comedy drama television series based on the book series of the same name by Lemony Snicket (the pen name of American author Daniel Handler) for Netflix. It stars Neil Patrick Harris, Patrick Warburton, Malina Weissman, Louis Hynes, K. Todd Freeman, and Presley Smith. Dylan Kingwell, Avi Lake, Sara Rue and Lucy Punch join the cast in the second season.

Similar to the book series, A Series of Unfortunate Events follows the misadventures of the three Baudelaire children, Violet, Klaus, and Sunny, following the deaths of their parents and the destruction of their home. While the children are shuffled between various foster homes, they are pursued by Count Olaf, who desires to gain control of the vast Baudelaire inheritance before Violet comes of age. Along the way, the Baudelaires discover their parents' connections to an elusive secret society called the Volunteer Fire Department (often abbreviated to V.F.D.).

The first season, which premiered on January 13, 2017, consists of eight episodes and adapts the first four books of the series. The second season was ordered in March 2017 and released on March 30, 2018, consisting of ten episodes and adapting the fifth through the ninth books. The third and final season, which was announced in April 2017 and released on January 1, 2019, consists of seven episodes and adapts the remaining four books.

Throughout its run, the series received critical acclaim, with praise towards its production values, writing, faithfulness to the novels, and acting, particularly that of Harris as Count Olaf.

== Premise ==
When a mysterious fire destroys their home and kills their parents, the Baudelaire children, Violet, Klaus and Sunny, are placed in the care of their distant 'relative' Count Olaf, an actor who is determined to claim the family fortune for himself. Following Olaf's failed attempt to possess the Baudelaire fortune and his plot being exposed, the Baudelaires are placed in the custody of a series of mostly inept or unsympathetic guardians, as they try to elude Olaf and his followers, whilst attempting to uncover the mystery behind a secret society from their parents' past. The deadpan, mysterious, and melancholic Lemony Snicket narrates the Baudelaires' misadventures for the audience.

== Cast and characters ==
=== Main ===
- Neil Patrick Harris as Count Olaf, a failing actor who is determined to claim the Baudelaire fortune for himself. He is a member of the fire-starting side of the secret organization V.F.D. (Volunteer Fire Department). He has a unibrow and a tattoo resembling an eye on his left ankle, which is frequently used to identify him when he is disguised.
- Patrick Warburton as Lemony Snicket, the deadpan narrator and member of V.F.D. who is tasked with explaining the events during the lives of the Baudelaires.
- Malina Weissman as Violet Baudelaire, the eldest Baudelaire sibling, a talented inventor and mechanic
- Louis Hynes as Klaus Baudelaire, the middle Baudelaire child, who holds an interest in literature and books
- K. Todd Freeman as Arthur Poe, the family banker at Mulctuary Money Management and executor of the Baudelaire parents' estate, who is in charge of placing the Baudelaires in the care of a suitable guardian. He is often seen to be oblivious to the crimes around him despite the Baudelaire siblings telling him
- Presley Smith as Sunny Baudelaire, the infant Baudelaire child with unnaturally strong teeth and eventually a love for cooking. Tara Strong provides Sunny's babbling sound effects, the meaning of which is often translated in subtitles. Smith's own voice was also used within the third season.
- Lucy Punch as Esmé Squalor (seasons 2–3), a glamorous, wealthy financial advisor, who becomes an ally and love interest for Count Olaf
- Dylan Kingwell as Duncan and Quigley Quagmire (main seasons 2–3; guest season 1), Isadora's brothers. Duncan is a keen journalist, while Quigley, a cartographist, is Isadora and Duncan's long-lost sibling who was thought to have perished in the fire at the Quagmire home.
- Avi Lake as Isadora Quagmire (main season 2; guest seasons 1 & 3), Duncan and Quigley's sister who loves writing poetry, specifically couplets, which she learned to write from her parents

=== Recurring ===
- Will Arnett as the Quagmires' father, a man associated with VFD who is trying to return home to his children
- Cobie Smulders as the Quagmires' mother, a woman associated with VFD who is trying to return home to her children
- Usman Ally as Fernald the Hook-Handed Man, a member of Count Olaf's theatre troupe with hooks instead of hands
- Matty Cardarople as the Henchperson of Indeterminate Gender, a member of Count Olaf's theatre troupe who does not have a specific gender
- Cleo King as Eleanora Poe, Arthur Poe's wife and the editor-in-chief of The Daily Punctilio who loves pursuing sensationalist headlines
- John DeSantis as the Bald Man, a tall bald-headed man who is another member of Count Olaf's theatre troupe
- Jacqueline and Joyce Robbins as the White-Faced Women, two elderly twins who are members of Count Olaf's theatre troupe
- Sara Canning as Jacquelyn Scieszka, Mr. Poe's standoffish secretary and a member of VFD
- Patrick Breen as Larry Your-Waiter, a member of VFD who is seen working as a waiter at various establishments the Baudelaires visit including the Anxious Clown, Prufrock Preparatory's cafeteria, Café Salmonella, and the Hotel Denouement's Indian restaurant
- Sara Rue as Olivia Caliban, a librarian at Prufrock Preparatory School who later enlists as a member of VFD when she becomes invested in the Baudelaires' plight and even becomes the latest Madame Lulu
- Nathan Fillion as Jacques Snicket, the dashing adventurer brother of Lemony Snicket and member of VFD who enlists Olivia Caliban to help the Baudelaires
- Kitana Turnbull as Carmelita Spats, a spoiled, bratty student at Prufrock Preparatory School. She later becomes Olaf and Esmé's adoptive daughter
- Allison Williams as Kit Snicket, the sister of Lemony and Jacques Snicket, member of VFD, and Count Olaf's former fiancée

=== Guest ===
==== Introduced in season 1 ====
- Joan Cusack as Justice Strauss, a judge and Count Olaf's neighbor who helps the Baudelaires and hopes to adopt them
- Kaniel Jacob-Cross and Jack Forrester as Edgar and Albert Poe, Arthur Poe's two sons who are unwelcoming to the Baudelaires
- Darcey Johnson as Trolleyman, the driver of a rickety trolley
- Luke Camilleri as Gustav Sebald, a member of VFD and Monty's former assistant who made some films that had certain codes in it
- Aasif Mandvi as Montgomery "Uncle Monty" Montgomery, a distant relative of the Baudelaires and enthusiastic herpetologist who claims to have spent his childhood with their late parents. He is a member of VFD and possesses a VFD spyglass.
- Matthew Walker as the Ticket Seller, an unnamed Ticket Seller at Tedia's movie theater who is a friend of Montgomery and a member of VFD. Mark Kandborg portrays him in a flashback seen in "Carnivorous Carnival".
- Alfre Woodard as Aunt Josephine Anwhistle, a distant relative of the Baudelaires at Lake Lachrymose who has many rational and irrational fears since the loss of her husband Ike and a love of grammar. She is a member of VFD.
- Barry Sonnenfeld as Ike Anwhistle, the late husband of Josephine who is first seen as a picture cameo in "The Wide Window" and appears in person in a flashback scene in "Carnivorous Carnival" as a member of VFD
- Rob LaBelle as a taxi driver
- Don Johnson as Sir, the cigar-smoking owner of Lucky Smells Lumbermill
- Catherine O'Hara as Georgina Orwell, an optometrist, member of the fire-starting side of VFD, and Count Olaf's ex-girlfriend who hypnotizes the Lucky Smells Lumbermill workers so they never leave, also causing them to believe the Baudelaire parents set fire to Paltryville. O'Hara previously portrayed Justice Strauss in the 2004 film adaptation.
- Rhys Darby as Charles, Sir's partner who is friendly towards the Baudelaires
- Timothy Webber as Jimmy, a worker at Lucky Smells Lumbermill
- Chris Gauthier as Phil, an optimistic worker who befriends the Baudelaires during their stay at the Lucky Smells Lumbermill. He later reunites with the Baudelaires as the cook on the Queequeg submarine.
- Loretta Walsh as Norma Rae, a worker at Lucky Smells Lumbermill
- Trent Redekop as Cesar, a worker at Lucky Smells Lumbermill

Daniel Handler cameos as a fish salesperson at Lake Lachrymose.

==== Introduced in season 2 ====
- Roger Bart as Nero Feint, the violin-playing vice-principal of Prufrock Preparatory School and struggling musician with an egotistic personality, a penchant for mimicking what someone says in a high voice, and a love for excessive punishments
- Bronwen Smith as Miss Tench, Prufrock Preparatory School's gym teacher who is replaced in the post by a disguised Count Olaf while on her way back to Prufrock Preparatory School with the pep squad and the sports team
- Malcolm Stewart as Mr. Remora, a teacher at Prufrock Preparatory School who specializes in teaching his personal anecdotes and is always seen eating a banana
- BJ Harrison as Mrs. Bass, a teacher at Prufrock Preparatory School who specializes in measuring objects. She later becomes a bank robber.
- Tony Hale as Jerome Squalor, the timid husband of Esmé Squalor
- Sage Brocklebank as Doorman, an unnamed doorman who works at 667 Dark Avenue
- Ithamar Enriquez as Hector, a skittish handyman and citizen of the Village of Fowl Devotees who befriends the Baudelaires
- Mindy Sterling as Elder Anabelle, a member of the Village of Fowl Devotees' Council of Elders who often quotes "silence" when a non-police officer and/or a non-banker consultant attempts to violate the "No one may talk while on the platform" rule
- Carol Mansell as Elder Jemma, a soft-spoken member of the Village of Fowl Devotees' Council of Elders
- Ken Jenkins as Elder Sam, a gruff-speaking member of the Village of Fowl Devotees' Council of Elders
- Lossen Chambers as Mrs. Morrow, an inhabitant of the Village of Fowl Devotees who wears a pink robe
- Kevin Chamberlin as Mr. Lesko, an inhabitant of the Village of Fowl Devotees who wears plaid pants
- Serge Houde as Milt, the shopkeeper of the Last Chance General Store in the Hinterlands
- Gabe Khouth as Lou, the newspaper delivery boy who brings the Daily Punctilio's newspapers to the Last Chance General Store
- John Bobek as the bearded leader of the Volunteers Fighting Disease
- Lauren McGibbon as the perky member of the Volunteers Fighting Disease
- Kerri Kenney-Silver as Babs, the Head of Human Resources, Hospital Administration and party-planning at Heimlich Hospital
- David Alan Grier as Hal, a visually-disabled file clerk who is employed in the Library of Records at Heimlich Hospital
- Robbie Amell as Kevin, an ambidextrous "freak" who works at Caligari Carnival
- Kevin Cahoon as Hugo, a hunchbacked "freak" who works at Caligari Carnival
- Bonnie Morgan as Colette, a contortionist "freak" who works at Caligari Carnival
- David Burtka as Mr. Willums, a heckler with a pimpled chin who attends Caligari Carnival. He is based on The Man With Pimples On His Chin from "The Carnivorous Carnival" book.
- Jill Morrison as Mrs. Willums, the wife of Mr. Willums
- Harper and Gideon Burtka-Harris as Trixie and Skip Willums, the children of Mr. Willums

==== Introduced in season 3 ====
- Keegan Connor Tracy as Brucie, the leader of the Snow Scouts who is based on Bruce from the book series
- Richard E. Grant as the Man with a Beard but No Hair, a villain and mentor of Count Olaf who has an "aura of menace" that even frightens Count Olaf
- Beth Grant as the Woman with Hair but No Beard, a villain and mentor of Count Olaf who has an "aura of menace" that even frightens Count Olaf
- Kassius Nelson as Fiona Widdershins, the teenage captain of the Queequeg and Klaus' love interest who is looking for her stepfather Captain Widdershins ever since he was lost at sea. She is revealed to be the sister of Fernald.
- Max Greenfield as the Denouement brothers, identical triplets who are members of VFD and work at the Hotel Denouement. Dewey is the sub-sub-librarian of the Hotel Denouement and lover of Kit Snicket who the Baudelaires encounter. Frank and Ernest are the co-managers of the Hotel Denouement. Frank is described as the good brother on the fire-fighting side of VFD and Ernest is described as the villainous brother on VFD's fire-starting side with connections with Count Olaf.
- Morena Baccarin as Beatrice Baudelaire, the mother of the Baudelaire children and the love interest of Lemony
- Eric Keenleyside as the Fire Chief, the unnamed father of Count Olaf and chief of the city's fire department who was accidentally killed by Beatrice with a poison dart that was meant for Esmé
- Peter MacNicol as Ishmael, the leader of a group of castaways on an island and the founder of VFD who left when the "Schism" began. In the show, he is also the estranged principal of Prufrock Preparatory School.
- Nakai Takawira as Friday, a young girl living on an island
- Angela Moore as Miranda, the mother of Friday who lives on an island
- Simon Chin as Alonso, an inhabitant on an island
- Matthew James Dowden as Bertrand Baudelaire, the father of the Baudelaire children
- Angelina Capozzoli as Beatrice Baudelaire II, the daughter of Kit Snicket and Dewey Denouement who is taken in by the Baudelaire children and later reunites with her uncle Lemony

== Episodes ==
Season	Episodes	Originally released
1	8	January 13, 2017
2	10	March 30, 2018
3	7	January 1, 2019

=== Season 1 (2017) ===
The first season adapts the first four books of the novel series: The Bad Beginning, The Reptile Room, The Wide Window and The Miserable Mill.

No. overall	No. in season	Title	Directed by	Written by	Original release date
1	1	"The Bad Beginning: Part One" (Note: Netflix and critics name the first two episodes as "The Bad Beginning", following the title of the book, while the episode itself displays the name of "A Bad Beginning" after the opening credits.)	Barry Sonnenfeld	Daniel Handler	January 13, 2017
Violet, Klaus, and Sunny Baudelaire are told by well-meaning but inept banker Arthur Poe that their parents have perished in a house fire. While exploring the ruins, Klaus finds a broken spyglass with an insignia of an eye embedded on the front. Shortly afterwards, the children are sent to live with their distant relative Count Olaf, a cruel and vain amateur actor, who forces them into servitude. They also befriend Justice Strauss, Olaf's neighbor, who sees great potential in them. One night, the siblings prepare spaghetti alla puttanesca for Olaf's theatre troupe only for him to demand roast beef upon arriving home. The children state that they were never asked to prepare roast beef, angering Olaf and prompting him to slap Klaus across the face when he protests about the sleeping arrangements. Meanwhile, a mother and father are held against their will by a mysterious captor.
2	2	"The Bad Beginning: Part Two"	Barry Sonnenfeld	Daniel Handler	January 13, 2017
A flashback shows that Olaf, disguised as a consultant, convinced Mr. Poe to give himself custody of the Baudelaires because he lives close by, rather than their biologically closest relative. The Baudelaires attempt to convince Mr. Poe of Olaf's actions, only to be sent away when Poe dismisses their claims. When Olaf gives Violet the starring role in his latest theatrical production, which ends with the two main characters being married before Justice Strauss, the siblings realize that Olaf intends to acquire their fortune by marrying Violet for real. Klaus confronts Olaf, who threatens to kill Sunny if Violet doesn't follow through with his plans. At the last minute, Violet signs the marriage certificate with her left hand, invalidating the proceedings due to the fact that she is right-handed. Mr. Poe's mysterious secretary Jacquelyn and her ally Gustav reveal they were intended to be put in the care of Gustav's boss Montgomery Montgomery. Gustav later drowns after being hit by a poisoned dart.
3	3	"The Reptile Room: Part One"	Mark Palansky	Daniel Handler	January 13, 2017
The Baudelaires are sent to live with their herpetologist uncle Montgomery Montgomery, who has recently come across a reptile he calls the Incredibly Deadly Viper, a misnomer since the reptile is harmless and friendly. While attempting to learn more about Montgomery, Klaus discovers that the hedge maze in Montgomery's garden is exactly the same shape as the tattoo on Olaf's ankle. Olaf poses as Gustav's replacement Stephano and attempts to kidnap the Baudelaires, but Montgomery assures the Baudelaires that he recognizes Stephano as a threat. The four arrive at a movie theatre, where Monty deciphers a code sent for him through the subtitles of the film, using a spyglass identical to Klaus'. The message instructs him to bring the children to Peru. He fires Stephano shortly afterwards, believing him to be a spy sent to steal his research. Immediately after dismissing "Stephano", Montgomery notices that the door to his Reptile Room is ajar and investigates, only to be attacked by an unseen figure.
4	4	"The Reptile Room: Part Two"	Mark Palansky	Emily Fox	January 13, 2017
The next day, the Baudelaires discover Olaf standing next to Montgomery's corpse. Olaf threatens to kill Sunny unless the siblings accompany him to Peru, but is prevented from carrying out his plan when Mr. Poe accidentally crashes into their car when they are trying to leave. Olaf's theatre troupe then arrives disguised as police and nurses, and claim Montgomery was killed by the Incredibly Deadly Viper, despite Montgomery's claim of it being completely harmless. While searching for proof of the snake's innocence, Klaus discovers a statue in Montgomery's hedge maze, and a photograph of Montgomery, both of them carrying spyglasses identical to Klaus'. Violet proves Olaf to be the murderer; however, he escapes via the hedge maze with Klaus' spyglass. While pursuing him, the Baudelaires meet Jacquelyn, who is posing as a statue. She tells them to seek answers on the spyglasses from their Aunt Josephine while she hunts down Olaf via underground passageways.
5	5	"The Wide Window: Part One"	Barry Sonnenfeld	Daniel Handler	January 13, 2017
Mr. Poe takes the Baudelaires to live with their Aunt Josephine, an irrationally frightened woman who lives in a dilapidated house overlooking Lake Lachrymose. She refuses to answer questions about their parents, so the siblings pursue answers themselves around her house, and discover their parents were members of a secret organization, with spyglasses being used as useful devices. They are also shocked to find out that Josephine was once fierce and formidable, and developed her phobias after the death of her husband. Olaf, who has followed the Baudelaires, disguises himself as a sailor named Captain Sham before pretending to fall in love with Josephine at a marketplace. Despite the siblings' warnings, Josephine accepts his invitation to take her out for a fried egg sandwich. Later that night, the siblings discover that Josephine has jumped out the library's bay window and left a note informing them that "Captain Sham" is their new guardian.
6	6	"The Wide Window: Part Two"	Barry Sonnenfeld	Daniel Handler	January 13, 2017
As Mr. Poe prepares to hand the Baudelaires over to "Captain Sham", the siblings discover the note has several grammatical errors, something Josephine would never do since she was a strict grammarian. Mr. Poe takes the children to a restaurant and prepares to complete the transfer, but allows the siblings to leave after Larry, a waiter secretly a member of their parents' organization, triggers their allergy to peppermint. After returning to the house, the siblings decipher Josephine's suicide note and discover she is still alive and hiding in Curdled Cave moments before a hurricane sends the house teetering over the cliff. Escaping with a photograph of their parents standing in front of a lumber mill, the siblings find Josephine at a nearby cave, only to be confronted by Olaf, who abandons Josephine to be eaten alive by the leeches that inhabit Lake Lachrymose. Upon returning to shore, Olaf escapes after being unmasked in front of Mr. Poe while the Baudelaires sneak away and set out to find the lumber mill in the photograph.
7	7	"The Miserable Mill: Part One"	Bo Welch	Joe Tracz	January 13, 2017
Upon arriving at the Lucky Smells Lumber Mill, the Baudelaires are forced to work by the owner Sir, who blames their parents for starting a fire that destroyed the entire town. While investigating the workers' unnaturally happy behavior, Klaus' glasses are broken by the Hook-Handed Man posing as Foreman Flacutono, and he visits local optometrist Georgina Orwell, Olaf's ex-girlfriend, who puts Klaus into a hypnotic trance. Later that day, the siblings learn that two visitors are waiting to see them. Believing that their parents are still alive, the three are shocked to instead find Orwell and her receptionist "Shirley St. Ives", who is a poorly-disguised Olaf. Meanwhile, the mother and father who were previously held captive are revealed to be the parents of the Quagmire triplets, with whom they are reunited.
8	8	"The Miserable Mill: Part Two"	Bo Welch	Tatiana Suarez-Pico	January 13, 2017
The Baudelaires discover the entire mill is under a hypnotic trance, ensuring they do not leave their jobs. During the workday, a hypnotized Klaus operates heavy machinery recklessly, causing him to injure optimistic worker Phil. Orwell and Olaf's plan is to get the Baudelaires fired from the Lumber Mill and have Olaf, disguised as "Shirley", step in to adopt them. Orwell and Olaf use a still-hypnotized Klaus to try to murder Sir's partner Charles, but Violet figures out how to break everyone's trance in the nick of time. The workers then storm the mill, causing Orwell to fall into the furnace and die. Sir escapes in the chaos while Count Olaf and the Hook-Handed Man get away. Charles reveals the truth about the Baudelaires' role in the town, where they actually helped to fight the fire. The three siblings are reunited with Mr. Poe, and Jacquelyn sends Klaus the broken spyglass that Olaf stole from him. Poe then sends the three siblings to a dreary boarding school, which two of the three Quagmire siblings are also sent to, due to their house being burnt down by an unknown woman. The Quagmires' parents are revealed to be members of the organization. In the final scene, Lemony Snicket, Count Olaf, the Baudelaires, and Mr. Poe sing the song "That's Not How the Story Goes".

=== Season 2 (2018) ===
The second season adapts books five through nine of the novel series: The Austere Academy, The Ersatz Elevator, The Vile Village, The Hostile Hospital, and The Carnivorous Carnival.

No. overall	No. in season	Title (Note: Netflix names the episodes of the second and third seasons as Part 1 and Part 2, while the episodes themselves display the names as Part One and Part Two after the opening credits, following the format of the first season.)	Directed by	Written by	Original release date
9	1	"The Austere Academy: Part 1"	Barry Sonnenfeld	Daniel Handler	March 30, 2018
The Baudelaires are introduced to life at Prufrock Preparatory School, an unpleasant and underfunded institution run by an unpleasant vice-principal named Nero and terrorized by an equally unpleasant student named Carmelita Spats. The school's only redeeming qualities are its friendly and highly intelligent librarian Olivia Caliban and the surviving Quagmire triplets Duncan and Isadora. During a lunch break, Klaus and Isadora discover that they are holding two halves of the same spyglass. The newfound friends quickly realize that they must track down a book on secret organizations to find the answers they seek: a book Jacquelyn sent Larry to give them, but which he carelessly misplaced. Meanwhile, Count Olaf and his troupe lurk around the grounds of the school, unable to enter the front doors due to an advanced computer system programmed by Nero to detect Olaf's presence. However, with Carmelita's help, Olaf finally gains entry and locks Larry in the cafeteria's walk-in refrigerator. He then dons his latest disguise: the school's new turban-wearing gym teacher named Coach Genghis.
10	2	"The Austere Academy: Part 2"	Barry Sonnenfeld	Joe Tracz	March 30, 2018
Olaf is able to convince Nero to put the Baudelaires under a grueling exercise program, making the siblings run endless laps at night to prevent them from scheming against him, while also causing them to perform poorly in class from lack of sleep. Due to their slumping grades, Nero threatens to expel the Baudelaires and put them under the guardianship of "Coach Genghis" if they fail a comprehensive exam to be given in front of the entire school, but because they must still exercise under Olaf's program, they know they will likely fail. The Quagmires offer to help, and that night take their place during exercises; however, their identity is discovered. While hiding in the library, they find the copy of the book on secret organizations and read up on the purpose of the spyglass before they are caught by the Hook-Handed Man. The next day, with Mr. Poe in attendance, the Baudelaires readily pass the exam, and through it reveal Olaf's identity. Olaf and his gang then escape with the Quagmires, who try to shout the initials "VFD" from the backseat of Olaf's car. Meanwhile, Larry is rescued from the refrigerator with the help of Lemony's brother, Jacques, while Olivia walks off with the book on secret organizations that the Quagmires left behind.
11	3	"The Ersatz Elevator: Part 1"	Bo Welch	Daniel Handler	March 30, 2018
While a citywide manhunt for Count Olaf is underway, Mr. Poe takes the Baudelaires to the penthouse of Jerome Squalor and his trendy financial advisor wife Esmé. While being introduced to the Squalors, they find Olaf has already arrived, posing as a foreign auctioneer named Gunther. The Baudelaires theorize that Olaf is trying to kill Jerome so that he can marry Esmé and become their legal guardian again. They search the penthouse for the Quagmires to no avail, but Klaus becomes suspicious of an extra elevator that only seems to serve the penthouse. Meanwhile, Olivia tries to convince Mr. Poe about Olaf's scheme, which leads Jacquelyn to contact Jacques, who enlists her into their society. Esmé suggests they go out for lunch at a fashionable salmon-themed restaurant Cafe Salmonella, where Larry works to prolong their visit, giving Jacques and Olivia time to search the Squalor's building for the Quagmires. When the Baudelaires manage to sneak away and examine the second elevator, they learn that it is merely an empty shaft. When Olaf convinces Esmé to go back to the penthouse, Jacquelyn and Larry hold him back by making him sing a song. With a makeshift parachute, the Baudelaires descend the shaft to find the Quagmires locked in a cage at its bottom.
12	4	"The Ersatz Elevator: Part 2"	Bo Welch	Daniel Handler	March 30, 2018
The Baudelaires do not have the tools to free the Quagmires, so they ascend the shaft by turning the parachute into a hot-air balloon. They try to warn Esmé of Olaf's scheme but learn too late that she is in cahoots with him and that they are planning to smuggle the Quagmires out of the city. Esmé pushes them down the elevator shaft, where they are caught in a net midway down. Sunny helps them to escape safely, and afterward, they find a secret passage that leads to the ashen ruins of their home. At the auction in Veblen Hall, the Baudelaires start a bidding war on a box labeled "VFD", which they believe contains the Quagmires. Though they win the item, they find the box contains only doilies. In the aftermath, Olaf and his troupe escape with the Quagmires, who are hidden inside a red herring statue. The Baudelaires ask Jerome to help track down Olaf, but he is far too timid to do so and gives up his guardianship of them. Mr. Poe tells the children that a village with the initials "VFD" is willing to raise them.
13	5	"The Vile Village: Part 1"	Barry Sonnenfeld	Sigrid Gilmer	March 30, 2018
Mr. Poe drops the Baudelaires off at the Village of Fowl Devotees, a village overrun with many strict rules where the whole community will care for them collectively if they promise to do the entire village's chores. The Baudelaires take up residence with Hector, a kindly handyman prone to fainting spells who is secretly building a self-sustaining hot-air mobile home. The Baudelaires soon begin finding clues written by the Quagmires. Olaf, Esmé, and the troupe also arrive at the village, with Esmé disguising herself as the town's new chief of police. Jacques and Olivia also arrive and detain Olaf at the local jailhouse; the next day, the villagers learn of Olaf's capture and hold a trial, where Olaf appears in the disguise of Detective Dupin, tricking everyone into believing Jacques is Olaf. Jacques is sentenced to death, but Olivia convinces Esmé to free her and Jacques in exchange for the location of the Sugar Bowl, an object with ties to Esmé's past. Jacques stays behind to confront Olaf; however, the villain is unfazed by Jacques' offer of a truce, and he and Esmé incapacitate and kill him. The next morning, as the Baudelaires try to break into the jail to rescue Jacques, they are informed that "Olaf" has been murdered.
14	6	"The Vile Village: Part 2"	Barry Sonnenfeld	Sigrid Gilmer	March 30, 2018
The disguised Olaf and Esmé quickly convince Mr. Poe and the town that the Baudelaires murdered Jacques/"Olaf", and they are wrongfully condemned to be burned at the stake without trial. While in jail, the children instruct Hector to prepare his hot-air mobile home to help them escape. Violet creates a battering ram to weaken the jail wall using a bench, a loaf of stale bread, and a noose. Klaus deduces from clues that the Quagmires are hidden inside a crow fountain in the village square. Larry and Jacquelyn arrive on the scene to distract the villagers long enough for the children to escape via a fire truck and follow Hector. The Baudelaires cover for the Quagmires as they use the truck's ladder to climb aboard the mobile home. As they do so, Olaf, Esmé, and the villagers arrive, and Esmé begins damaging Hector's home with a harpoon gun. Realizing their danger, the Baudelaires tell Hector to escape with the Quagmires. In thanks, the Quagmires try to throw their friends their notes about the secrets of VFD, but Esmé shoots them with a harpoon, scattering the pages and harming a crow. While the villagers accost the disguised villains over the injured bird, the Baudelaires collect as many of the ruined pages as they can and make their escape.
15	7	"The Hostile Hospital: Part 1"	Allan Arkush	Joshua Conkel	March 30, 2018
The Baudelaires hitch a ride with volunteer singing candy stripers heading to Heimlich Hospital. They learn that there is a Library of Records that collects and stores esoterica. After sneaking past the hospital's administrator Babs, they meet Hal, the man who runs the library. He welcomes their help but forbids them to read the material in storage. While Hal shows them the ropes, a film reel labelled "Snicket" arrives and catches the children's attention. Meanwhile, believing the Sugar Bowl to be in the hospital, Olaf and his troupe infiltrate the building and take over it. Desperate for answers, the children are forced to steal Hal's keys to access the library, where they find the film. It contains a debriefing of Jacques by a VFD volunteer, with Jacques informing the interviewer that someone has survived a fire, which may or may not be the one that killed the Baudelaire's parents. However, before they can watch any further, they are interrupted by Esmé, who thinks they have the Sugar Bowl; as they try to escape, the library is ruined. Violet is captured by Olaf while Klaus and Sunny hide in a chute, in possession of the film.
16	8	"The Hostile Hospital: Part 2"	Allan Arkush	Joshua Conkel	March 30, 2018
Olaf and Esmé hide Violet under a false name; to find her, Klaus disguises himself as bearded and chubby "Dr. Faustus", with Sunny hidden in a sling underneath his coat. They eventually deduce which room Violet is in, but this is a trap laid by Olaf, who forces Klaus to operate a craniectomy on Violet inside an operating theatre. Esmé promises to call off the scheme if Klaus can give her what he stole from the Library of Records, and he does so—only, it's not the Sugar Bowl that she has been searching for. Olaf, however, is interested in the Snicket film and dashes off to watch it to learn its secret. Furious at its revelations, he burns the film, which also starts a fire in the hospital. The Baudelaires successfully evacuate the hospital and realize that their only chance to escape safely is in the trunk of Olaf's car. Hal is left depressed over the loss of the Library of Records. Elsewhere, an unknown person recovers the Sugar Bowl from the burning hospital.
17	9	"Carnivorous Carnival: Part 1" (Note: These episodes include "The" in the episode name after the opening credits, following the titles of the book, while Netflix names them without it.)	Loni Peristere	Joe Tracz	March 30, 2018
A flashback to a masked ball at the VFD headquarters shows Lemony trying to warn Beatrice about Olaf. In the present, Olaf and his troupe arrive at the Caligari Carnival to speak with its fortune-teller, Madame Lulu, about the fire's survivor. Lulu, who is really Olivia in disguise, tells them to wait for the answer in the morning. The Baudelaires overhear this, and hoping to speak to Lulu as well, assume the identities of circus freaks, with Violet and Klaus as a two-headed person and Sunny as a wolf child. After calling VFD, Olivia is able to tell Olaf the next day that one of the Baudelaire parents did indeed survive the fire. Olaf then presents a freak show that proves disastrous, so he sets off to find a pack of roaming lions to help attract a larger crowd. This gives an opportunity for the children to sneak into Lulu's tent, where they discover films, books, and disguises belonging to the VFD — the secret organization their parents and guardians belonged to. They also learn what VFD stands for: Volunteer Fire Department. Olivia then appears and reveals her true identity to them.
18	10	"Carnivorous Carnival: Part 2"	Loni Peristere	Joe Tracz	March 30, 2018
Olivia explains to the Baudelaires that "Madame Lulu" is an alias used by VFD agents to gather information. While Olivia admits she had to lie to Olaf about one of the children's parents surviving the fire, Jacques had asserted that there was a survivor, and they should head to the VFD headquarters in the Mortmain Mountains to find them. Meanwhile, Olaf plans to throw one of the freaks into a pit filled with the hungry lions he has corralled, while Esmé connives to have Lulu killed. The next day, Olaf selects Violet and Klaus for the pit. When Olivia is told to push the children to the lions, she instead pushes them to safety but is sent tumbling into the pit by Olaf, who recognises her. As the children try to collect the VFD materials from Lulu's tent, Olaf arrives and forces them to burn the tent down. Then, after placing Violet and Klaus in a towed caravan and taking Sunny in his car, Olaf has the other freaks cut the towing rope on a steep mountain path. At the same time, the previous operative to pose as Madame Lulu, the one who retrieved the Sugar Bowl, arrives at the burning carnival as Lemony Snicket claims that she is someone he knows.

=== Season 3 (2019) ===
The third and final season adapts the final four books of the novel series in seven episodes: The Slippery Slope, The Grim Grotto, The Penultimate Peril, and The End, with the final book being adapted as a single episode.

No. overall	No. in season	Title	Directed by	Written by	Original release date
19	1	"Slippery Slope: Part 1"	Jonathan Teplitzky	Daniel Handler	January 1, 2019
Violet and Klaus escape from the out-of-control caravan using an improvised drag chute. Escaping snow gnats, they seek shelter in a cave with the Snow Scouts including the hostile Carmelita Spats. With the help of a Scout who is revealed to be Quigley Quagmire in disguise, the Baudelaires discover the Vertical Flame Diversion which leads to the mountainside V.F.D headquarters, but it is already burned. Meanwhile, Count Olaf's troupe and a captive Sunny make camp at the peak of Mount Fraught. Sunny wins the sympathy of several of Olaf's troupe, particularly the Hook-Handed Man, who has become disillusioned with Olaf and his own life decisions and has developed a close bond with the orphan. Elsewhere in the mountains, a pregnant Kit Snicket (in possession of the sugar bowl) is pursued by the Man With A Beard But No Hair and the Woman With Hair But No Beard, who are revealed to be Count Olaf's mentors. Kit escapes, but loses the sugar bowl in the Stricken Stream and runs into a lost Mr. Poe. After killing the carnival freaks, the Man and Woman meet Olaf and berate him for his obsession with the Baudelaires, saying he needs to see the bigger picture.
20	2	"Slippery Slope: Part 2"	Jonathan Teplitzky	Daniel Handler	January 1, 2019
Violet and Quigley prepare to rescue Sunny while Klaus searches V.F.D headquarters for information. He deciphers a message: A person called J.S. is gathering all surviving VFD members at the Last Safe Place on Thursday. Sunny uses a Verdant Flammable Device to signal her siblings. Violet and Quigley climb Mount Fraught and reach Sunny but she convinces them to let her stay as a spy. Violet, Klaus, and Quigley trap Esmé to trade her for Sunny. Pressured by the Man and the Woman, Count Olaf orders his troupe to throw Sunny's cage down the mountain, but all but the Hook-Handed Man refuse and desert him. The Hook-Handed Man pretends to kill Sunny, who has already escaped using Violet's lockpick. Olaf's mentors kidnap the Snow Scouts with eagles, intending to kill their parents, indoctrinate the Scouts, and gain their fortunes. Carmelita joins Olaf and Esmé while the Baudelaires and Quigley escape down the slope via sled. Quigley is caught by a branch as the Baudelaires sweep out to the ocean and end up on top of the submarine Queequeg. Meanwhile, Kit and Mr. Poe return to the city to discover several fires burning as a result of the Man and Woman's plans.
21	3	"Grim Grotto: Part 1"	Liza Johnson	Joshua Conkel	January 1, 2019
Fiona Widdershins welcomes the Baudelaires aboard the Queequeg where they reunite with Phil, the sub's cook. Fiona is searching for her stepfather, Captain Widdershins, and the sugar bowl. In pursuit, Olaf, Esmé, Carmelita, and the Hook-Handed Man pose as a family to rent an octopus-shaped submarine paid for by the Man with a Beard But No Hair and the Woman with Hair But No Beard. Klaus uses ocean currents to track the sugar bowl to the Gorgonian Grotto, located near Anwhistle Aquatics. Fiona sets course there, warning them about the Medusoid Mycelium, a highly poisonous mushroom. After an encounter with an unseen giant sea monster called the Great Unknown, they are caught by Olaf's sub. Fiona hides after relaying an SOS to VFD; Kit receives the message and sends Quigley to meet them. Olaf forces the Baudelaires to dive into the Grotto and recover the sugar bowl. There, the children enter the abandoned laboratories of Anwhistle Aquatics and see Quigley waiting for them at the surface, having already recovered the sugar bowl. The Medusoid Mycelium begins to rapidly wax, forcing the children back to the Queequeg, where they discover that Sunny's diving suit has been contaminated, poisoning her.
22	4	"Grim Grotto: Part 2"	Liza Johnson	Sigrid Gilmer	January 1, 2019
Despite Sunny's poisoning, Olaf places the Baudelaires in his brig. The Hook-Handed Man helps them escape. Returning to the Queequeg, Violet, Klaus, and Fiona determine that the antidote for the Medusoid Mycelium is horseradish, but there is none aboard; Sunny suggests a substitute, wasabi, which cures her. Violet presents Sunny's sealed contaminated helmet to Fiona for future study, and Fiona obtains a coded message revealing the Last Safe Place for VFD: the Hotel Denouement. The Hook-Handed Man reveals that he is Fiona's brother and his name is Fernald, responsible for burning down Anwhistle Aquatics for fear that VFD might use the Medusoid Mycelium as a weapon. They are cornered by Olaf, but Fiona allows the Baudelaires to escape in the Queequeg by offering Olaf the helmet. After an encounter with the Great Unknown, the Baudelaires return to Briny Beach, where Mr. Poe offers to help clear their names. However, the children refuse his assistance as Kit Snicket arrives by taxi, promising them answers; they speed off to the Hotel Denouement. Quigley gives the sugar bowl to a flock of crows. Fernald is forced to reveal the Last Safe Place to Olaf and he and Fiona are imprisoned, but begin their escape.
23	5	"Penultimate Peril: Part 1"	Barry Sonnenfeld	Joe Tracz	January 1, 2019
At the Hotel Denouement, Kit warns the Baudelaires of villains infiltrating VFD and asks them to signal her if the hotel is not safe for the Thursday meeting. Inside, the children meet Frank and Ernest Denouement, twin brothers who co-manage the hotel, and spot Olaf, Esmé, and Carmelita posing as a family. They sneak off by themselves, each seeming to help Frank or Ernest prepare to recover the sugar bowl being flown in by crow. The mysterious J.S. who reunited V.F.D is revealed to be Justice Strauss, who has been gathering information to incriminate Olaf. When the Baudelaires compare their stories, they determine there must be a third Denouement brother, and discover Dewey Denouement, who manages the sub-sub-library of VFD information under the hotel. The children are confronted by Olaf with a harpoon gun, but protect Dewey and trick Olaf into breaking up with Esmé. A defeated Olaf surrenders the gun to the Baudelaires, but they inadvertently drop it when Mr. Poe appears and it fires, impaling Dewey. Lemony Snicket, prompted by his sister Kit, arrives at the hotel to help the Baudelaires.
24	6	"Penultimate Peril: Part 2"	Barry Sonnenfeld	Joe Tracz	January 1, 2019
The scene flashbacks to before the schism, where Esmé, Olaf, Lemony, Kit, and Beatrice at an opera. Lemony Snicket offers to help the children escape, but they decide to stay and put Olaf behind bars when Justice Strauss comes into view. The Schism's origin is shown in flashbacks: During the original theft of Esmé's sugar bowl, Beatrice accidentally killed Olaf's father, while Lemony, in love with Beatrice, took the blame for both crimes and fled. In the present, Justice Strauss oversees a blindfolded trial to prove the Baudelaires innocent of killing Dewey, and find Olaf guilty of his crimes, but Olaf turns the trial around and the High Judges, revealed to be the Man with a Beard but No Hair and the Woman with Hair but No Beard, declare the children guilty. In the confusion, Olaf kidnaps Strauss and, unable to find the sugar bowl, sets fire to the hotel (after Sunny suggests burning down the hotel). Fleeing to the roof, Olaf recovers the sample of Medusoid Mycelium and decides to use it to get revenge on those who have harmed him. The Baudelaires, faced with the moral complexities of VFD and their own actions, decide to burn down the hotel as The Last Safe Place is safe no more. The Baudelaires warn the hotel guests but it is implied that some do not escape the fire. Strauss pleads with them to join her to safety, but they sadly refuse as the world is no longer safe for them. Olaf and the children parachute a sailboat into the nearby sea. As guests flee the burning hotel, a panicked Lemony arrives. Strauss explains what happened and gives him a photo of the Baudelaires, with which he begins his investigation of their fate.
25	7	"The End"	Bo Welch	Daniel Handler and Joe Tracz	January 1, 2019
Caught in a storm, Olaf and the Baudelaires wash up on a remote island. Olaf is imprisoned by the islanders' leader Ishmael, while the Baudelaires discover their parents had once lived on the island, returning to the mainland before Violet's birth. Ishmael reveals he founded VFD but grew tired of the endless battle between good and evil. Kit arrives on a raft of books, caught by the storm while trying to help the Quagmires. Olaf breaks free and disguises himself unsuccessfully as Kit, but Ishmael impales him with a harpoon gun, shattering the helmet and infecting everyone with the Medusoid Mycelium. The islanders depart in an outrigger in search of a horseradish factory, while the Baudelaires discover that their parents modified the island's apples to provide immunity from the fungus. Olaf unexpectedly rescues Kit, kissing her and reciting poetry before dying of his wound. Kit refuses the apple antidote to protect her unborn child and dies after giving birth to Beatrice. After a year on the island, the Baudelaires decide to return to the mainland. Some years later, young Beatrice meets with her uncle Lemony, who tells the audience that even though life has many stories, some unfortunate and many unknown, he still hopes for the best, both in regards to the Baudelaire's stories and his own future with his niece.

== Production ==
=== Development ===
The thirteen A Series of Unfortunate Events novels, written by Daniel Handler under the pen name Lemony Snicket from 1999 to 2006, achieved success in young adult fiction around the same time as the Harry Potter novels. As such, the Snicket books had been optioned to be filmed before they were published. This led to the development of a 2004 feature film, Lemony Snicket's A Series of Unfortunate Events, which covered the narratives of the first three novels in the series. Barry Sonnenfeld, who has expressed his love for the series, was originally slated to direct the feature film and had hired Handler to write the screenplay. About 10 months into production, shortly after the casting of Jim Carrey as Olaf, there was a "big crisis", according to Handler, which caused producer Scott Rudin to walk away and Sonnenfeld left the production under unclear terms. With the film's completion in flux, its producing studios Paramount Pictures and DreamWorks fired Handler. While the film was eventually completed and released, sequels which would adapt the other novels in the series became unlikely due to "corporate shakeups" within DreamWorks, according to Handler, and the child actors that portrayed the Baudelaire children grew too old to star in a sequel.

Both Sonnenfeld and Handler still wanted to see the series fully fleshed out in a visual format, and with the onset of streaming television, believed this was a better method of presenting the series. Sonnenfeld approached Netflix with the idea, stressing that he wanted to make the series far less overproduced compared to the feature film, instead having the entire show able to be shot on stage in a dry and flat manner, and without having to hide any of the darker scenes such as character deaths. Netflix agreed, and in November 2014, publicly announced plans to adapt the book series into a television series in association with Paramount Television. Handler was named the series' executive producer. By September 2015, Netflix announced that Sonnenfeld's involvement as both director and executive producer, as well as Mark Hudis as showrunner, and Handler writing some of the scripts along with working with the series' writing team. However, in January 2016, Netflix announced that Hudis had left the project, with a replacement showrunner not named at the time.

The first season consists of eight episodes, with two episodes adapting each of the first four books of the series. Handler considered this more in line with how he had written the books in the manner of a serialized melodrama, citing The Perils of Pauline as one of his influences in writing the book series. In January 2017, Handler revealed that he was writing the series' second season, to consist of ten episodes adapting the fifth through ninth books of the series. A third season would adapt the remaining novels of the series, which Handler hoped "to get the go-ahead to do" since "given how quickly young actors age and change, we're trying to film everything as quickly as possible". In March 2017, Netflix revealed the series had been renewed for a second season by releasing a video on their social media pointing to a viral marketing website, where a letter written by Snicket revealed the decision. A month later, the series was "quietly" renewed for a third season, which Harris confirmed would be the final one for the series. While the screenplays written by Handler otherwise stay in concert with the books, Handler did add a new conclusion to the work that he felt gave some proper closure in an organic manner that did not take away from the series.

=== Casting ===
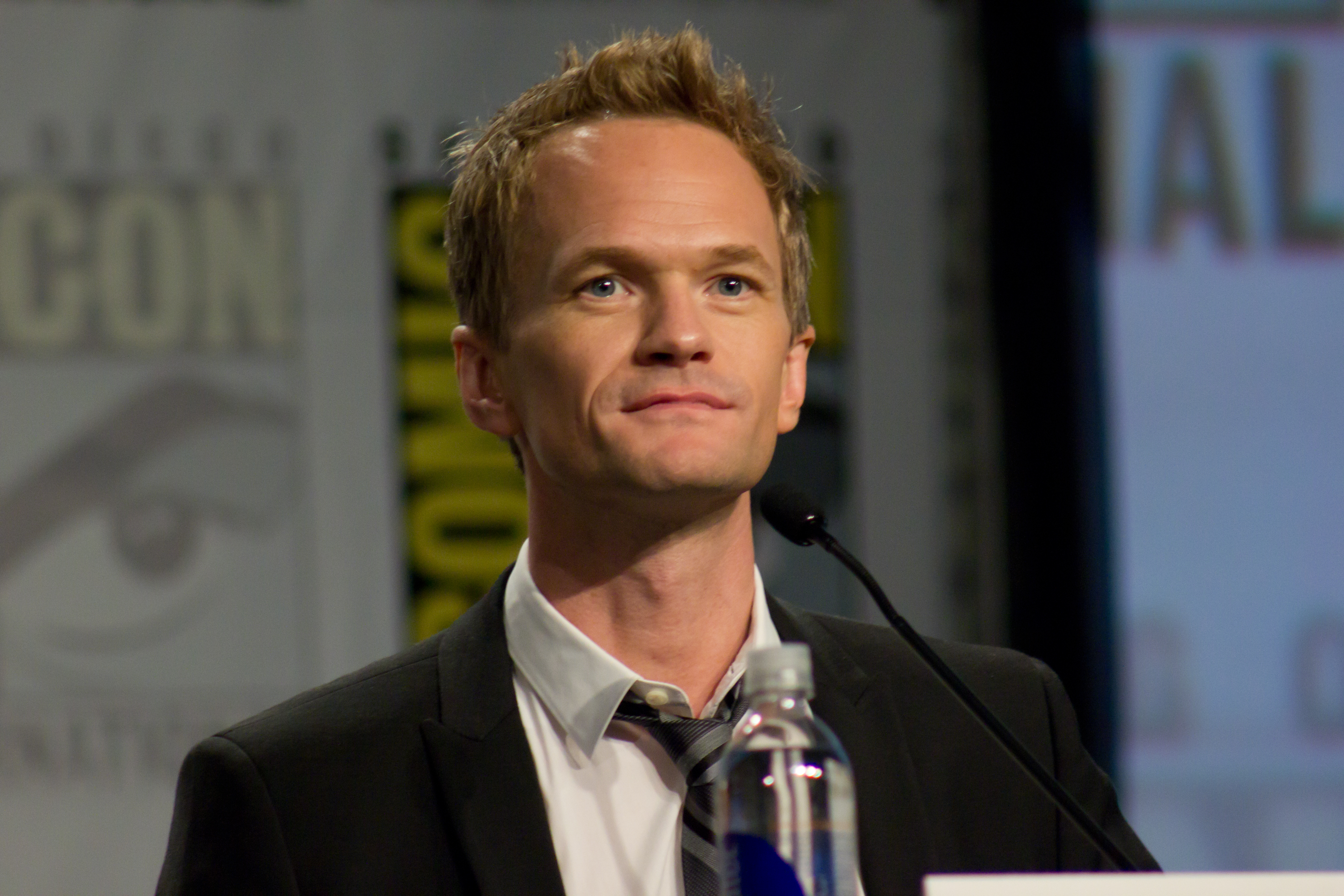
Neil Patrick Harris portrays Count Olaf in the series and serves as a producer.

On December 3, 2015, an open casting call was announced for the roles of Violet and Klaus Baudelaire. Sonnenfeld had worked with Malina Weissman before on the film Nine Lives and had appreciated her ability to speak quickly without overacting, and selected her for Violet from her audition. They had more difficulty in landing an actor for Klaus, but Louis Hynes, who had no professional acting prior, had submitted a promising audition video. Casting flew Hynes from London to Los Angeles while in the middle of set production, and after about an hour of testing with Weissman, Hynes was selected as Klaus as a last-minute option. Both were announced by January 2016.

Handler had first considered Neil Patrick Harris for the role of Count Olaf after seeing him perform the opening number "It's Not Just for Gays Anymore", at the 65th Tony Awards in 2011, noting "I just immediately saw someone who could pull off a million things at once" as was necessary for the character of Olaf, who utilizes various disguises and accents in his quest to steal the Baudelaire fortune. Sonnenfeld also felt Harris had done enough work on both stage, screen, and film to handle the breadth of characterization that Olaf displayed over the course of the book series. Sonnenfeld had previously met Harris over Thanksgiving 2015, prior to Sonnenfeld being confirmed for the project. Sonnenfeld hinted to Harris about the potential role, and once Netflix hired Sonnenfeld, proceeded to offer him the role. In January 2016, Netflix announced that Harris had been cast as Count Olaf.

One of the key changes that Sonnenfeld and Handler wanted for the series was to make Lemony Snicket a more visible character narrating on adventures of the Baudelaire children from their relative future, allowing him to be in scenes without actually being part of the events. Casting Patrick Warburton for Lemony was Handler's idea, despite Sonnenfeld having worked with Warburton in several previous productions. Handler felt Warburton was an actor that can deliver comedic lines without being too obvious about it, as well as bringing the emotional breadth that the character needed to show. Warburton's casting was confirmed by March 2016.

It was also revealed that Presley Smith would play Sunny Baudelaire, whose quasi-nonsensical lines are voiced by Tara Strong. The casting department had initially sought a set of twin infants for the role, a standard practice to avoid complications from weariness during filming. None of those auditioned had the look that they felt was appropriate for the part. Smith however, had both the personality and look they felt appropriate for Sunny, and took the risk of casting a single actor for the role.

Other casting included: in March 2016, K. Todd Freeman was cast as Mr. Poe, and Aasif Mandvi as Uncle Monty. In September 2016, it was revealed that Dylan Kingwell and Avi Lake were cast as the Quagmire siblings, Duncan and Isadora, respectively. In November 2016, Handler revealed Catherine O'Hara, Don Johnson, and Alfre Woodard had been cast as Dr. Georgina Orwell, Sir, and Aunt Josephine, respectively; O'Hara had previously portrayed Justice Strauss in the 2004 film adaptation of A Series of Unfortunate Events. Rhys Darby would play Charles, Sir's partner.

=== Filming ===
Production began in May 2016 in Vancouver, British Columbia, and in August 2016 several cast members expressed through social media that filming had finished. Filming for the second season began in April 2017. The third season began filming on January 5, 2018.

One aspect of the series of books that the production team wanted to be captured in the series was the notion of a lack of specific time period or geography for the settings; Handler stated that he wrote enough for establishing set pieces, but purposely left more specific details vague "in order for young readers to fill in the blanks themselves". Sonnenfeld wanted to capture that same sense of ambiguous time and place, and he and his team worked to try to define a set of subjective rules of what elements could be included. Sonnenfeld brought on Bo Welch, production designer for Edward Scissorhands, which Handler considered to capture the same sense of a "familiar but completely imaginary" suburban setting he had in mind for his books. While the production team used computer-generated imagery where needed, they attempted to avoid this use where possible, such as by using large painted backdrops, by key scenic artist John E. Wilcox, rather than employing green screen filming.

=== Music ===
In April 2016, Nick Urata was initially reported to be composing music for the series. Once the first season was released, it was revealed that Urata collaborated with Daniel Handler to compose the main title theme, "Look Away", as well as various original songs that appear throughout the series, with Handler contributing the lyrics. The first season's original score was composed by James Newton Howard, with his frequent collaborators Sven Faulconer and Chris Bacon filling in to score certain episodes. In the second season, Jim Dooley joined the production as a composer and subsequently wrote the music for eight of the season's ten episodes and the rest of season 3, with Nick Urata to compose the second season's first two episodes.

"Look Away", the theme song for the opening titles of the series, is performed by Neil Patrick Harris. In keeping with the tone of the book series, the song warns the viewer against continuing to watch the unpleasant story any further. The lyrics of the middle part of the song change for each pair of episodes, comprising a brief synopsis of those episodes' premise.

=== Visual effects ===
Zoic Studios created visual effects for the series, including the effects for many of Sunny Baudelaire's actions. Tippett Studio also did work on the series, including the effects for the destruction of Josephine's house, landscape shots of Lake Lachrymose and some of the more movement heavy Sunny Baudelaire shots.

== Release ==
All eight episodes of the first season of A Series of Unfortunate Events were released worldwide on Netflix on January 13, 2017, in Ultra HD 4K. The second season was released on March 30, 2018. The third season was released on January 1, 2019.

=== Marketing ===
On July 5, 2015, a video titled "An Unfortunate Teaser" was uploaded to YouTube by a user named "Eleanora Poe". Netflix quickly released a statement saying "This was not released from Netflix." Media outlets were almost unanimous in agreement that the trailer was fan-made. However, Caitlin Petrakovitz of CNET argued that the trailer may be real and that Netflix's carefully worded denial was a marketing campaign, noting the user name "Eleanora Poe" being the same as a character from the series, and that a shellac record seen in the trailer was of The Gothic Archies, a band who provided the theme music for the audio books of A Series of Unfortunate Events. The trailer was later revealed to be a spec promo, similar to a spec script, by an independent commercial director, whom Netflix contracted to make a title sequence for the series after the video's popularity, though they did not go ahead with the concept.

In October 2016, Netflix released the first teaser trailer for A Series of Unfortunate Events, where Warburton narrates the events of the series as Lemony Snicket. A trailer, featuring footage from the series and Neil Patrick Harris's character, Count Olaf, was released by Netflix in November 2016, followed shortly by the first full trailer. The second trailer was released in December 2016, followed by a "holiday-themed" trailer from Count Olaf leading fans to a viral marketing website for the fictional Valorous Farms Dairy, which featured four holiday e-cards for download.

As part of the marketing for the third season, Netflix released a YouTube trailer of Count Olaf and Lemony Snicket on November 13, 2018 giving alternative accounts of the events of the previous seasons, with the former describing them as a series of "learning experiences" and the latter as a "series of unfortunate events". On December 10, Netflix released a second YouTube trailer, featuring Allison Williams as Kit Snicket and introducing Richard E. Grant as the villainous "Man with a Beard but No Hair" and Beth Grant as the villainous "Woman with Hair but No Beard".

== Reception ==
=== Audience viewership ===
At the time of the series release, Netflix did not reveal subscriber viewership numbers for any of their original series. Symphony Technology Group compiled data for the first season based on people using software on their devices that measure television viewing by detecting a program's sound. According to Symphony, 3.755 million viewers aged 18–49 within the United States were watching an episode of A Series of Unfortunate Events over the average minute in its first weekend of release.

=== Critical response ===
==== Season 1 ====
The first season of A Series of Unfortunate Events received critical acclaim. Review aggregator Rotten Tomatoes gives the season an approval rating of 94% based on 69 reviews with an average rating of 8.06/10. The site's critical consensus reads: "Enjoyably dark, A Series of Unfortunate Events matches the source material's narrative as well as its tone, leaving viewers with a wonderfully weird, dry, gothic comedy." On Metacritic the season has a score of 81 out of 100, based on 24 critics, indicating "universal acclaim".

Erik Adams of The A.V. Club awarded the season a B and praised it for treating "mature themes like grief, loss, and disappointment with sardonic honesty". Adams compared the program positively to the Adam West Batman series, calling it "kids stuff with adult sophistication, driven by two-part stories, outrageous visuals, and the scenery-chewing of big-name guest stars". Ben Travers of Indiewire gave the series an A−, saying that it "proves as inspirational and endearing as it claims to be forlorn and heartbreaking". Brian Lowry of CNN praised the showrunners for "infusing the show with a lemony-fresh feel, conjuring a series similar to the fantastical tone of Pushing Daisies". Lowry wrote that "the show proves a good deal of fun" and that "Harris dives into his over-the-top character with considerable gusto." He also argued that the series improved upon the 2004 film.

Several critics praised the television series as a better adaptation of the books than the 2004 feature film, which starred Jim Carrey as Count Olaf. Kelly Lawler of USA Today felt the television format gave the stories more room to develop, the addition of Warburton as the fourth wall-breaking Snicket helped to convey some of the wordplay humor used in the books, and Harris's portrayal of Olaf was "much more dynamic, and creepier" than Carrey's version. The Verge's Chaim Gartenburg said that the show follows the books much more faithfully than the film, and "nails down the tone that made the stories so special". Los Angeles Times writer Robert Lloyd felt that the backgrounds of Sonnenfeld and Welch made them "the right people for this job, set in a milieu that is hard to fix in time, except to say it is not now", in capturing the tones of the book compared to the feature film.

Nick Allen of RogerEbert.com, on the other hand, gave the series a negative review, calling it "an unfunny parody of sadness" that is "never as clever as it wants to be" and would only appeal to fans of the books. Caroline Framke of Vox Media praised the series for its unique and weird visuals, but found the show's tone, pacing and performances to be haphazard and considered the show to be "literally, a series of unfortunate events".

==== Season 2 ====
As with the first season, the second season received critical acclaim. Review aggregator Rotten Tomatoes gives the second season an approval rating of 94% based on 18 reviews with an average rating of 7.81/10. The site's critical consensus reads: "Ripe with its signature flavor of doom and gloom, A Series of Unfortunate Events' second season still offers a boon of quirky characters and kids to root for with a rising tide of sustained hope." Clarisse Loughrey of The Independent praised the show as one that "essentially deals with thoughtful, intelligent young people battling to speak up against an illogical world." While observing that the "show may revel in the miserable", she opined "that the purpose of its own morbidity is to offer the assurance that hope lives in even the darkest of places." Loughrey also credited the show's expanded storyline for the Baudelaires' adult allies for "plumping up" the episodes' narrative arcs and deepening the show's emotional impact.

Tristram Fane Saunders of The Telegraph awarded the second season four out of five stars. He described the show as a "gothic treat [that] also offers a wicked line in absurdist humour, and the most gorgeously toybox-like set designs you'll find anywhere outside a Wes Anderson film". Radio Times reviewer Huw Fullerton praised the series for its faithfulness to the original novels. While praising the improved CGI used to make Presley Smith's character Sunny Baudelaire react better to situations, he criticized the addition of supporting "good" characters such as Nathan Fillion's Jacques Snicket and Sara Canning's Jacquelyn for "undercutting the bleakness and loneliness that characterized the novels".

Rohan Naahar of the Hindustan Times described A Series of Unfortunate Events as "one of the most lavish originals in Netflix's bottomless catalogue, created by fans, for fans". He also praised Neil Patrick Harris's performance as Count Olaf. The Den of Geek reviewer Michael Ahr praised tortoise-shell 'amphibiophones' and stone marimbas score for giving the television series its primal sound. IGN reviewer Jonathon Dornbush criticized the second season's formulaic plot structure and lack of the insightful observations compared to the first season. He also praised several of the second season's episodes particularly "The Ersatz Elevator", "The Hostile Hospital", and "The Carnivorous Carnival" for smartly twisting the story formula and deepening the novel series' mythology. Dornbush also praised the performance of Lucy Punch and Patrick Warburton and awarded the second season 7.2 stars.

==== Season 3 ====
As with the previous seasons, the third season received critical acclaim, with the season receiving a 100% rating on Rotten Tomatoes based on 16 reviews and an average rating of 8.43/10. The site's critical consensus reads: "The final installment of Lemony Snicket's magnum opus adds new contours to its expansive cast, provides answers to some of the pernicious questions within the series' lore, and delivers a finale that is more graceful than unfortunate." Jonathan Dornbush of IGN praised the third season for bringing "an emotionally satisfying ending to its macabre tale"; awarding it 8.7 out of 10. He also praised the series for deepening the characterizations of the Baudelaires, Lemony Snicket, and Count Olaf and skillfully incorporating the source material. Samantha Nelson of The Verge praised series directors Mark Hudis and Barry Sonnenfeld for basing the series closely on the original novels; writing that the third season "is a masterclass in how to build a faithful adaptation, and how to see it to the end gracefully". Similarly, Petrana Radulovic praised the series for its faithfulness to the source material and for "balancing absurd humor with deeper questions of morality".

Rohan Naahar of the Hindustan Times awarded the season 4/5 stars, writing "that Netflix's most lavish and underrated original ends on a satisfying note". He praised Neil Patrick Harris's performance as Count Olaf as the "performance of a lifetime". Naahar also praised Patrick Warburton for his role as the "fourth wall-breaking" narrator Lemony Snicket. Akhil Arora of NDTV gave the season finale a mixed review, criticizing the show's adherence to the original novels and what he regarded as the ludicrous nature of the earlier episodes' adventures. However, he praised the series' latter episodes for exploring deeper themes such as morality, the blurred lines between nobility and wickedness, and moral gray areas.

Gabriel Bergmoser of Den of Geek praised the series as a "rare adaptation that complements, respects, and gently reconfigures its source material". However, he opined that the series' happy ending in contrast to the ambiguous ending in the novels would create contention among fans. Ryan Grow of the San Diego Entertainer Magazine described the third season as the "best and most exciting in the series", awarding it 4.5 out of five stars. He praised the richly-layered characters for enabling the main cast to deliver "emotionally believable performances".

== Awards and nominations ==
Year	Award	Category	Nominee	Result	Ref
2017	Leo Awards	Best Visual Effects in a Dramatic Series	Luis Alejandro Guevara, Bob Habros, Cale Jacox, Ron Simonson, Jeffrey De Guzman	Nominated	
2017	Leo Awards	Best Make-Up in a Dramatic Series	Rita Ciccozzi, Krista Seller, Tanya Hudson, Gitte Axen	Won	
2017	Leo Awards	Best Hairstyling in a Dramatic Series	Julie Mchaffie, Dianne Holme, Jenine Lehfeldt	Won	
2017	Leo Awards	Best Guest Performance by a Female in a Dramatic Series	Sara Canning	Nominated	
2017	Saturn Awards	Best New Media Television Series	A Series of Unfortunate Events	Nominated	
2017	Primetime Emmy Awards	Outstanding Music Composition for a Series (Original Dramatic Score)	James Newton Howard	Nominated	
2017	Gold Derby TV Awards	Comedy Actor	Neil Patrick Harris	Nominated	
2017	Hollywood Music in Media Awards	Main Title Theme – TV Show/Limited Series	Nick Urata and Daniel Handler	Won	
2017	Peabody Awards	Children's & Youth Programming	A Series of Unfortunate Events	Won	
2018	Satellite Awards	Best Actor in a Series – Comedy or Musical	Neil Patrick Harris	Nominated	
2018	Art Directors Guild Awards	One-Hour Period or Fantasy Single-Camera Series	"The Bad Beginning: Part One", "The Reptile Room: Part One", "The Wide Window: Part One"	Nominated	
2018	Primetime Emmy Awards	Outstanding Children's Program	A Series of Unfortunate Events	Nominated	
2018	Primetime Emmy Awards	Outstanding Fantasy/Sci-Fi Costumes	"The Vile Village: Part 1"	Nominated	
2019	Art Directors Guild Awards	One-Hour Period or Fantasy Single-Camera Series	"The Ersatz Elevator: Part One"	Nominated	
2019	Producers Guild of America Awards	Outstanding Children's Program	A Series of Unfortunate Events (Season 2)	Nominated	
2019	Writers Guild of America Awards	Children's Script – Episodic and Specials	"Carnivorous Carnival: Part One", Teleplay by Joe Tracz	Nominated	
2019	Writers Guild of America Awards	Children's Script – Episodic and Specials	"The Ersatz Elevator: Part One", Teleplay by Daniel Handler	Won	
2019	Directors Guild of America Awards	Outstanding Directorial Achievement in a Children's Program	Allan Arkush (for "The Hostile Hospital: Part 1")	Nominated	
2019	Directors Guild of America Awards	Outstanding Directorial Achievement in a Children's Program	Barry Sonnenfeld (for "The Vile Village: Part 1")	Nominated	
2019	Directors Guild of America Awards	Outstanding Directorial Achievement in a Children's Program	Bo Welch (for "The Ersatz Elevator: Part 1")	Nominated	
2019	Costume Designers Guild Awards	Excellence in Sci-Fi/Fantasy Television	Cynthia Summers	Nominated	
2019	Artios Awards	Children's Pilot and Series (Live Action)	David Rubin Corinne Clark (Location Casting) Jennifer Page (Location Casting) Andrea Bunker (Associate)	Won	
2019	Make-Up Artists and Hair Stylists Guilds	Children and Teen Television Programming – Best Make-Up	Rita Ciccozzi, Krista Seller, Bill Terezakis	Won	
2019	Make-Up Artists and Hair Stylists Guilds	Children and Teen Television Programming – Best Hair Styling	Julie McHaffie, Dianne Holme for A Series of Unfortunate Events	Won	
2019	Kid's Choice Awards	Favorite TV Drama	A Series of Unfortunate Events	Nominated	
2019	Kid's Choice Awards	Favorite Male TV Star	Neil Patrick Harris	Nominated	
2019	Primetime Emmy Awards	Outstanding Children's Program	A Series of Unfortunate Events	Nominated	
2020	Costume Designers Guild Awards	Excellence in Sci-Fi/Fantasy Television	Cynthia Summers (for "Penultimate Peril: Part 2")	Nominated	
2020	Make-Up Artists and Hair Stylists Guilds	Children and Teen Television Programming – Best Make-Up	Rita Ciccozzi, Tanya Hudson, Krista Seller	Won	
2020	Make-Up Artists and Hair Stylists Guilds	Children and Teen Television Programming – Best Hair Styling	Julie McHaffie, Dianne Holme	Won	
2020	Producers Guild of America Awards	Outstanding Children's Program	A Series of Unfortunate Events (Season 3)	Nominated	
2020	Directors Guild of America Awards	Outstanding Directing – Children's Programs	Barry Sonnenfeld (for "Penultimate Peril: Part 1")	Nominated	
2020	Art Directors Guild Awards	One-Hour Period or Fantasy Single-Camera Series	Bo Welch (for "Penultimate Peril: Part 1")	Nominated	
