= Robert Gordon (screenwriter) =

American screenwriter

- Born: United States
- Occupation(s): Screenwriter, film producer
- Years active: 1997–present

Robert Gordon is an American screenwriter and film producer. His writing credits consist of Addicted to Love (1997), Galaxy Quest (1999), Men in Black II (2002), and Lemony Snicket's A Series of Unfortunate Events (2004). He also was an associate producer on Sky Captain and the World of Tomorrow (2004).

== Filmography ==
- Addicted to Love (1997) (Writer)
- Galaxy Quest (1999) (Screenplay)
- Men in Black II (2002) (Screenplay/Story)
- Lemony Snicket's A Series of Unfortunate Events (2004) (Screenplay)
- Sky Captain and the World of Tomorrow (2004) (Associate Producer)
- Wonder Park (2019) (Story)
