= Addicted to Love (film) =

1997 romantic comedy film directed by Griffin Dunne

- Theatrical release poster
- Directed by: Griffin Dunne
- Written by: Robert Gordon
- Produced by: Jeffrey Silver; Robert Newmyer
- Starring: Meg Ryan; Matthew Broderick; Kelly Preston; Tchéky Karyo
- Cinematography: Andrew Dunn
- Edited by: Elizabeth Kling
- Music by: Rachel Portman
- Production companies: Miramax Films; Outlaw Productions
- Distributed by: Warner Bros.
- Release date: May 23, 1997
- Running time: 100 minutes
- Country: United States
- Box office: $34.7 million

Addicted to Love is a 1997 American romantic black comedy film directed by Griffin Dunne and starring Meg Ryan, Matthew Broderick, Tchéky Karyo, and Kelly Preston. Its title is based on Robert Palmer's song "Addicted to Love," and a cover of the song by Neneh Cherry is featured in the film.

Sam bands together with Maggie, as their respective former partners are together and in love. Their shared goal is to break them up, he wants Linda back while she seeks revenge.

Addicted to Love was released by Warner Bros. on May 23, 1997 and grossed $34.7 million.

== Plot ==
Sam works as an astronomer and enjoys an idyllic life with his childhood sweetheart Linda, who is a school teacher in their small town. She wants more experiences than can be offered there, so she goes to New York City for a two-month teaching fellowship.

Instead of returning home, Linda sends Sam a Dear John letter, announcing that she is staying in New York. He heads for the city, convinced he can get her back.

Sam quickly discovers that Linda is living with a new lover, French restaurant owner Anton. Sam breaks into an abandoned building across from Anton's residence, and converts his astronomy equipment to surveillance equipment. He sets up house (and a camera obscura), watching her interactions with Anton in the hopes of finding more information about them, as well as predicting when they will disband.

Sam's surveillance operation is later discovered by Maggie, a photographer and motorcyclist, determined to get revenge on Anton, her ex-fiancé. She installs herself in a nearby room, and soon has sound equipment set up to spy on the couple.

Out of money and wanting to find out more about Anton, Sam takes a job at his restaurant as a dishwasher. As the men talk, they become friends, though Anton remains unaware of Sam's connection to Linda.

Sam and Maggie team up in the hope of driving Linda and Anton apart. Together, they resort to a series of nasty tricks, including identity theft, assault, publicly humiliating him with a street performer's monkey, paying kids to spray him with women's perfume in the street, and planting women's underwear and receipts for expensive gifts. They eventually cause Anton's restaurant to be shut down by bringing in cockroaches on a busy night with a food critic there.

Mutually hostile at first, Sam and Maggie eventually warm up to each other in their quest to break up Linda and Anton, complicating their original mission to win their former partners back. When Maggie's nan visits, she insists that they kiss for a photo (she believes he is her fiancé), and they share a moment. But suddenly, they discover Linda has left Anton. He really had slept with another woman, someone in the bank to help with a loan.

With Linda now gone, Maggie pushes Sam out and he runs into a desolate Anton, who talks him into joining him at his place. Maggie watches as they interact. The next day, she is there spying on Sam when he sees and kisses Linda, and again watches him that night as he assists Anton after unintentionally putting him an upper body cast. When Sam mentions Maggie, Anton becomes suspicious of him and attacks him.

After tempers have cooled, Maggie and Anton agree to call it even, while Sam comes clean with Linda. Sam eventually returns to Maggie, while Linda gets back together with Anton.

== Cast ==
- Meg Ryan as Maggie
- Matthew Broderick as Sam
- Kelly Preston as Linda
- Tchéky Karyo as Anton
- Maureen Stapleton as Nana
- Remak Ramsay as Professor Wells
- Lee Wilkof as Carl
- Dominick Dunne as Matheson
- Larry Pine as Street Comic
- Bill Timoney as Restaurant Patron
- Daniel Dae Kim as Undergrad Assistant

== Reception ==
=== Box office ===
The film, marking actor Griffin Dunne's full-length directorial debut, was released on May 23, one week before the highly competitive Memorial Day weekend in the United States.

The film opened at No. 2 at the North American box office making US$11.4 million in its opening weekend, behind The Lost World: Jurassic Park.

The film only managed to gross $34,673,095 at the box office, several million less than either Ryan's or Broderick's averages.

=== Critical response ===
On Rotten Tomatoes, the film has an approval rating of 55% based on reviews from 31 critics. On Metacritic, it has a score of 49 out of 100 based on reviews from 19 critics, indicating "mixed or average reviews." Audiences surveyed by CinemaScore gave the film a grade B on scale of A to F.

Chicago Sun-Times film critic Roger Ebert panned it as immature, implausible and imbecilic, giving it two stars out of a possible four. Kevin Thomas of the Los Angeles Times called the film "creepy," writing:

It is exceedingly difficult to find what's funny in the calculated, obsessive, relentless destruction of Anton, especially when he proves to be the most likable and mature of all four of these people. Maybe Addicted to Love might work as a pitch-dark comedy, but in the way Robert Gordon has written it and Griffin Dunne directed it, it gives us the impression that we're supposed to take drastic, irrational revenge as a larky laff riot.

Time Out New York film critic Andrew Johnston wrote: "Some say that movies named after hit songs always suck. In its own unspectacular way, Addicted to Love proves them wrong. Griffin Dunne's directorial debut is no artistic triumph, certainly, but it is a reasonably entertaining big-screen sitcom." In 2020, David Sims, film critic for The Atlantic, called it "underrated" and "a personal favorite."

== Locations ==
While the majority of the filming took place where it was set, in the Greenwich Village area of New York City, some shooting was done in Centreville, Delaware and Swarthmore, Pennsylvania.
