= The Miserable Mill =

2000 children's novel

- Author: Lemony Snicket (pen name of Daniel Handler)
- Illustrator: Brett Helquist
- Cover artist: Brett Helquist
- Language: English
- Series: A Series of Unfortunate Events
- Genre: Gothic fiction Absurdist fiction Mystery
- Publisher: HarperCollins
- Publication date: April 15, 2000
- Publication place: United States
- Media type: Print (hardback & paperback)
- Pages: 194
- ISBN: 0-06-440769-1
- Preceded by: The Wide Window
- Followed by: The Austere Academy

Book the Fourth: The Miserable Mill is the fourth novel of the children's novel series A Series of Unfortunate Events by Lemony Snicket. In this novel, the Baudelaire orphans live with the owner of Lucky Smells Lumbermill. The book was published on April 15, 2000, by HarperCollins and illustrated by Brett Helquist.

== Plot ==
Violet, Klaus and Sunny Baudelaire are traveling on a train heading for Paltryville, the location of the children's new home, the Lucky Smells Lumbermill.

Upon arrival, the children learn that they will have to work at the mill, but as part of the deal, their new guardian, Sir (whose name is impossible to pronounce otherwise), will try to keep Count Olaf, their nemesis, away. They meet Sir's more kind “partner”, Charles, who shows them the library, which contains three books, one about the history of the lumbermill, one about the town constitution, and one donated by Dr. Georgina Orwell, the local optometrist, who lives in an eye-shaped building, which also resembles, suspiciously, the tattoo of an eye on their nemesis Count Olaf's ankle.

Klaus breaks his own glasses when he is purposely tripped by the new foreman, Flacutono, who is one of Count Olaf's assosiates, and is sent to see Dr. Orwell. When Klaus returns from the optometrist, hours later, he acts strangely, as if in a trance. The next day in the lumbermill, Flacutono instructs Klaus to operate a stamping machine. Klaus causes an accident by dropping the machine on Phil, an optimistic coworker. Flacutono exclaims that the machine "cost an inordinate amount of money". The other workers ask what the unfamiliar word means and Klaus defines the word. Klaus explains that he doesn't remember what happened between when he broke his glasses and waking up in the mill. Foreman Flacutono trips him again, once again causing his glasses to break. This time though, Violet and Sunny accompany Klaus to Dr. Orwell's office.

Together, they arrive at the eye-shaped building they saw on their arrival to Lucky Smells. Dr. Orwell, seemingly friendly, lets them in, and tells Violet and Sunny to sit in the waiting room. Violet and Sunny realize that Count Olaf is disguised as Shirley, a receptionist and that Klaus has been (and is being) hypnotized by Orwell, who is in cahoots with Olaf. They leave with Klaus, who is once again in a trance and calls Violet "Veronica." When they return to the mill, they find a memo from Sir informing them that if there is another accident, he'll place them under Shirley's care.

Violet and Sunny put Klaus to bed and go to the mill's library. Violet reads the book donated by Orwell, a difficult task given her limited vocabulary and the book's usage of difficult words. She learns that Orwell's technique uses a command word to control the subject and an "unhypnotize" word. They then hear the lumbermill starting early and rush to see what is happening. They find Charles strapped to a log which Klaus is pushing through a buzz saw as Flacutono gives orders. The girls notice Klaus' bare feet, a clue that he has been hypnotized out of bed yet again. Shirley and Orwell arrive, and the latter orders Klaus to ignore his sisters. Violet realizes the release word ("inordinate") just in time. Violet is caught by Shirley and Flacutono, and Klaus manages to free Charles by trying to invent a fishing rod. Sunny and Orwell duel, with Orwell wielding a sword and Sunny bearing only her teeth. Sir enters the room, surprising Orwell and causing her to step backwards into the path of the buzz saw, killing her.

Shirley is exposed as Count Olaf and locked in the library, but he escapes from the window along with Foreman Flacutono, who is revealed to be the bald man with the long nose in disguise. Sir relinquishes the Baudelaires, forcing Mr. Poe to send them to boarding school.

== Foreshadowing ==
The last picture of The Miserable Mill shows Sir watching Olaf and his henchman escaping, while two students (a boy and a girl) prepare to board a school bus. This is a reference to Duncan and Isadora Quagmire, and the events of the next book: The Austere Academy.

== References in book ==
The name Georgina Orwell is most likely a reference to George Orwell, famed for his novels. Prominently amongst them is Nineteen Eighty-Four, which also involved brainwashing.

The name Sir is most likely a reference to Mr. Sir, a character in the Louis Sachar novel, Holes.

== Translations ==
- Portuguese: Serraria Baixo-Astral (Low Spirits Lumbermill), Cia. das Letras, 2000, ISBN 85-359-0210-4
- Finnish: Saiturin saha (The Miser's Mill), WSOY, 2003, " (Nightmare at the Sawmill)
- Greek: Το Εργοστάσιο της Συμφοράς (The Factory of Doom), ISBN 960-406-338-3
- Indonesian: Gelondongan Gila (The Crazy Logs) 2004, ISBN 979-22-0998-0
- Norwegian: Den mystiske mølla (The Mysterious Mill)
- Russian: Зловещая лесопилка (Sinister Sawmill), Azbuka, 2005, ISBN 5-352-00547-X
- Spanish: El Aserradero Lúgubre (The Lugubrious Mill)
- Swedish: Det Sällsamma Sågverket (The Strange Sawmill)
- Turkish: Bitik Orman (The Depleted Forest)
- Dutch: De Helse Houtzagerij (The Helish Sawmill)
- Polish: Tartak tortur (The Torture Lumber Mill)
- Japanese: 残酷な材木工場 (The Brutal Lumber Mill)
- Thai: โรงงานเขย่าขวัญ, Nanmeebooks Teen, 2003, ISBN 97-447-2817-5

== Adaptations ==
The book was adapted into the seventh and eighth episodes of the first season of the television series adaptation produced by Netflix. The episodes mirror the book's plot relatively closely, with some scenes and characters changed, such as "Flacutono" being the Hook-Handed Man in the TV series as opposed to the Bald Man in the book. The sword fight between Dr. Orwell and Sunny is removed, and as a result, Dr. Orwell dies by being thrown into the furnace instead of being cut in half by the buzzsaw. Additionally, there are major differences as to the fate of the mill and the town; the town was not burned down in the book, and the other staff were not hypnotized.
