= Pseudoneurotic schizophrenia =

- Specialty: Psychiatry

Pseudoneurotic schizophrenia is a postulated mental disorder categorized by the presence of two or more symptoms of mental illness such as anxiety, hysteria, and phobic or obsessive-compulsive neuroses. It is often acknowledged as a personality disorder. Patients generally display salient anxiety symptoms that disguise an underlying psychotic disorder.

In the 1940s, psychiatrists Paul Hoch and Philip Polatin created the term pseudoneurotic schizophrenia. This mental illness, however, is no longer acknowledged as a clinical entity. In 1972 it went on to be called borderline personality disorder, a term coined by Otto Friedmann Kernberg, which referred to an expansive range of issues.

Pseudoneurotic schizophrenia is in the Russian adapted version of the ICD-10 (code F21.3). It is also in ICD-10 listed as a schizotypal disorder.

== Signs and symptoms ==
The diagnosis of pseudoneurotic schizophrenia can be made with clinical observation and by various psychiatrical exams by a mental health professional and by the patient's explanation of his or her experiences. A patient must identify with at least two of these symptoms in order to be distinguished as a pseudoneurotic schizophrenic. The intensity of a symptom may vary with the individual patient's severity of the disorder. The symptoms are organized into disorders of thinking and association, disorders of emotional regulation, disorders of sensorimotor and autonomic functioning, pan-anxiety, pan-neurosis, and pansexuality. The two symptoms can fall under any of these categories.

=== Thought disorder ===
- A continuous, purposive thought cannot be carried. Thoughts that are somewhat similar appear to be the same.
- Ability to form and understand concepts is weak. New ideas cannot easily be merged with old concepts. Separate experiences are cultivated as separate concepts despite the fact that combining them would be more natural.
- Fantasy life and real life cannot be distinguished. Real occurrences seem to have been imagined and fantasy thoughts seem to have actually happened.
- Cognizance and concentration is lacking.
- Common instances of urged thought occur.
- Thought blocking, which is the opposite of the previous symptom, has also been reported to be a symptom of pseudoneurotic schizophrenia.
- Disturbances of awareness, attention, anticipation and concentration occur. Unpleasant behavior is not recognized. The idea that one can have effects on others is perplexed.
- Self-perception is altered.
- Anachronism

=== Emotional dysregulation ===
- Anxiety is provoked with acute ease. An anxiety episode can be stimulated by any change in the patient's activity or location. Anything unfamiliar, an experience or a person, can cause anxiety.
- Several different emotions are expressed simultaneously or in speedy succession. Display of emotions is modulated and unpredictable.
- Patient is apathetic towards commencing, maintaining, and stopping an emotional response.
- Anger is difficult to deal with. Feelings of fear, anger, and guilt are expressed inappropriately and responses are either very volatile or inert.
- Needs are strongly craved, but are bitterly rejected when offered. Provocation is sought and avoided at the same time.
- Anhedonia
- Patient pays either very little or excessive attention to friendly interactions from others.
- In attempt to feel emotion, patient will make a farce of regular demeanor. In doing so, patient may take advantage of others socially, sexually, and intellectually.
- Rejection of emotional feelings takes place because feelings are seen as proof of weakness.
- Patient craves instant satisfaction of all desires and expects immediate fulfillment.

=== Sensorimotor and autonomic functioning ===
- Sensory perception is flawed, distorting the way the patient sees themselves.
- Patient has extreme difficulty choosing and keeping up with consistent and appropriate reactions in social situations. Emotional reactions appear to be either overdramatic or played down.
- Irregular amount of energy is shown. Patient lacks or has too much energy at inappropriate times.

=== Anxiety ===
Diffuse anxiety is stimulated by a minor catalyst and may persist long after the catalyst disappears.

Pan-Neurosis is the existence of multiple neurotic symptoms such as:

- obsessions
- compulsions
- phobias
- hysteria
- depression
- hypochondriasis
- depersonalization

== See also ==
- Anhedonia
