= Panphobia =

Vague and persistent dread of some unknown evil

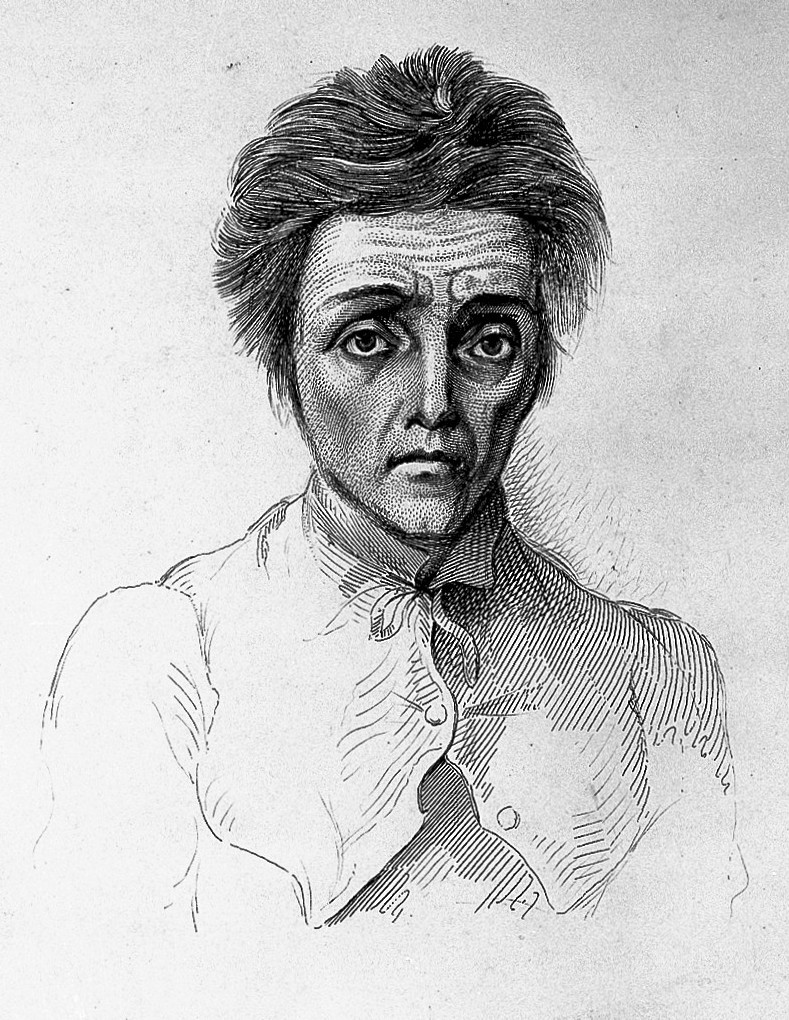
A woman diagnosed with panphobia, from Alexander Morison's 1843 book The Physiognomy of Mental Diseases

Panphobia, omniphobia, pantophobia, or panophobia is a vague and persistent dread of some unknown evil. Panphobia is not registered as a type of phobia in medical references.

== History ==
The term panphobia was coined by Théodule-Armand Ribot in his 1911 work The Psychology of the Emotions. He defined it as "a state in which a patient fears everything or nothing, where anxiety, instead of being riveted on one object, floats as in a dream, and only becomes fixed for an instant at a time, passing from one object to another, as circumstances may determine." The term comes from the Greek πᾶν - pan, neuter of "πᾶς" - pas, "all" and φόβος - phobos, "fear". The Greek root word pan (ex. pan-ic) describes "the unpleasant state inflicted by the intervention of the god Pan." Pan is characterized as a human–animal hybrid who "appeared as the agent of panic fear (that collective, animal-like disorder that seizes military camps at rest, especially at night) and of a form of individual possession (panolepsy)." According to Herodotus, it was Pan who was able to lead the Athenians to victory in the Battle of Marathon, forcing the Persians to flee. It has been argued that pantophobia may actually be considered the more accurate name to describe the non-specificity associated with a fear of all.

== Diagnosis ==
There is no specific phobia in the DSM-5 which provides criteria for an all-encompassing fear of everything, though the defining symptom for generalized anxiety disorder in this manual is "excessive anxiety and worry (apprehensive expectation) about a number of events or activities." Another very relatable state of mind is paranoia, in which one fears that unknown threats could, and most likely will, come from anyone, with distrust potentially leading to a loss of touch with reality. Delusional disorder is a more severe form of this type of disorder. Relevant academic literature may point to panphobia as merely a piece of such more complex states of mental disorder. Pseudoneurotic schizophrenia may be diagnosable in patients who, in addition to panphobia, also exhibit symptoms of pananxiety, panambivalence, and to a lesser extent, chaotic sexuality. These persons differ from generalized anxiety sufferers in that they have "free-floating anxiety that rarely subsides" and are clinically diagnosable as having borderline personality disorder in the DSM-IV-TR. No significant changes related to this personality disorder were made in transitioning to the DSM-5, suggesting the diagnostic criteria are still appropriate.

== See also ==
- A Fantastic Fear of Everything (2011 British film)
- Borderline personality disorder
- Generalized anxiety disorder
- List of phobias
- Paranoia
- Pseudoneurotic schizophrenia
