= Louis Hynes =

English actor (born 2001)

- Born: Louis Oliver Hynes; 9 October 2001 (age 24); Oxford, England
- Occupation: Actor
- Years active: 2015–present
- Known for: A Series of Unfortunate Events; The Great

Louis Oliver Hynes (born 9 October 2001) is an English actor. He is best known for his role as Klaus Baudelaire in the Netflix series A Series of Unfortunate Events, which ran from 2017 to 2019 and as Vlad in the first season of Hulu series The Great in 2020.

== Early and personal life ==
Louis Oliver Hynes was born and raised in Oxford, England, the middle of three children. Hynes plays bass guitar when he is not acting. He lives with his parents, Andrew and Lisa Hynes, his elder brother Milo, and younger sister Lara just outside Oxford. In March 2020 he shaved his head live on Instagram to raise money for The Trussell Trust, a network of foodbanks in the UK.

== Acting career ==
Hynes began his career in an acclaimed performance as Franzl in Intermezzo produced by Bruno Ravella at Garsington Opera. He played Young Alaric in the History Channel's series Barbarians Rising. From 2017 to 2019, he starred as Klaus Baudelaire in three seasons of the Netflix mystery-drama A Series of Unfortunate Events. In July 2017, he appeared in a new adaptation of The Saint which was released on Netflix. He played the role of the young Simon Templar. It was filmed in 2013. In 2019 Louis was nominated for a Young Artist Award. In 2020, he appeared in the Hulu series The Great. Along with the main cast of The Great, he was nominated for a Screen Actors Guild Award for Outstanding Performance by an Ensemble in a Comedy Series in 2021.

During the COVID-19 quarantine he started a podcast called "Louis' Lockdown Lowdown". Guests have included Amybeth McNulty, Declan McKenna and Elle Fanning.

== Filmography ==
Year	Title	Role	Notes	Ref.
2016	Barbarians Rising	Young Alaric	2 episodes	
2017	The Saint	Young Simon Templar	TV movie	
2017–2019	A Series of Unfortunate Events	Klaus Baudelaire	3 seasons	
2020	The Great	Vlad	Recurring role	
2026	Madfabulous	Neville	Post-production	
