= The Austere Academy =

2000 children's novel

- First edition cover
- Author: Lemony Snicket (pen name of Daniel Handler)
- Illustrator: Brett Helquist
- Cover artist: Brett Helquist
- Language: English
- Series: A Series of Unfortunate Events
- Genre: Gothic fiction Absurdist fiction Mystery
- Publisher: HarperCollins
- Publication date: August 31, 2000
- Publication place: United States
- Media type: Print (hardback & paperback)
- Pages: 225
- ISBN: 0-06-440863-9 (first edition, hardback)
- OCLC: 43952131
- Dewey Decimal: Fic 21
- LC Class: PZ7.S6795 Au 2000
- Preceded by: The Miserable Mill
- Followed by: The Ersatz Elevator

Book the Fifth: The Austere Academy is the fifth novel in the children's novel series A Series of Unfortunate Events by Lemony Snicket. The Baudelaire orphans are sent to a boarding school, overseen by monstrous employees. There, the orphans meet new friends, new enemies, and Count Olaf in disguises. It was published in 2000 in the US, and 2001 in the UK.

== Plot summary ==
Mr. Poe takes the Baudelaire children (Violet, Klaus and Sunny) to Prufrock Preparatory School, a boarding school they are to attend. Its motto is Memento Mori, “Remember You Will Die”, and it literally looks like a cemetery. They are greeted by a rude girl, Carmelita Spats, who calls the children "cakesniffers". Vice Principal Nero tells them about the school's odd rules: They are to sleep in a crab-infested, fungus-dripping shack because they have no living guardian to sign a permission slip for them. Additionally, since Sunny is too young to be a student, she will work as Nero's administrative assistant, and they all must attend Nero's nightly terrible violin concerts. Punishments for breaking these rules include being made to eat in the cafeteria with no silverware or hands tied behind one's back and having to purchase candy for Nero and watch him eat it. Sunny will have her silverware removed permanently for working in the administrative building, in which children are not allowed.

At lunch, Carmelita mocks the Baudelaires, but two kids named Isadora and Duncan Quagmire stand up for them. The Quagmires are triplets, and they say that their parents died in a fire that also killed their sibling Quigley. When they become adults, they will inherit a fortune of sapphires. Isadora writes rhyming couplets, while Duncan is passionate about journalism and research. Over the following days, Violet is a student of Mr. Remora, and must take detailed notes on his boring anecdotes, while Klaus is taught by Mrs. Bass, who makes her students endlessly measure the metric dimensions of objects. Isadora is in Klaus' class and Duncan is in Violet's. Sunny struggles to carry out her administrative work, which is intended for an adult.

Count Olaf soon arrives, disguised as the new gym teacher, Coach Genghis. As usual, Nero fails to recognize him or to take the children seriously when they raise concerns, so they pretend not to recognize Olaf. Carmelita delivers a message to the Baudelaires that they are to meet Genghis after dinner. He makes them paint a large, luminous circle on the lawn and run laps around it all night. He calls this "Special Orphan Running Exercises", abbreviated "S.O.R.E." After nine consecutive nights of S.O.R.E., Violet and Klaus begin failing tests in class, Sunny fails to complete administrative work, and they begin arguing with Duncan and Isadora.

The Baudelaires meet with Nero and tell him directly that Genghis is Olaf, but he is disbelieving. He demands that Violet and Klaus pass comprehensive exams set by their teachers the following morning, while Sunny must prepare homemade staples to use on Nero's paperwork, or they will be expelled and fired respectively, in which case Genghis will become the children's guardian. The Baudelaires must also give Carmelita earrings for each delivered message, and present Nero with candy for missing his concerts while doing S.O.R.E.

Duncan and Isadora disguise themselves as Violet and Klaus and steal a bag of flour from the cafeteria to pose as Sunny for the S.O.R.E. exercises that night. They hope Olaf will not notice the difference in the dark. The Quagmires leave their comprehensive notebooks for Violet and Klaus to learn from, while Violet invents a staple-making technique with a crab, a potato, metal rods, creamed spinach and a fork. Violet makes staples while Klaus reads from each notebook aloud.

After the children perform perfectly on their tests, Genghis arrives. He discovered that the Quagmires were impersonating the children after they left the bag of flour behind. As Mr. Poe arrives to give Nero and Carmelita the candy and earring, Nero expels the Baudelaires. The Baudelaires insist that Genghis remove his shoes and turban, to expose Olaf's distinctive eye tattoo and monobrow, and he chooses instead to run away. The Baudelaires pursue, succeeding in removing his shoes and turban. They discover that two members of his troupe, the white-faced women, were cafeteria workers and that Olaf has captured the Quagmires. As Klaus and Olaf reach the car, Duncan yells at Klaus, trying to communicate information he and his sister found in the library while researching Count Olaf. Duncan throws the pair's personal commonplace books at him and shouts out "V.F.D.", but Olaf kicks Klaus and snatches the notebooks up. Olaf reaches the car before the children and drives away with the white-faced women and the Quagmire children.

== Foreshadowing ==
In the last picture of The Austere Academy, a fish sticker is seen on the bumper of the car with the kidnapped Quagmires inside, foreshadowing the Fish District and Café Salmonella in The Ersatz Elevator.

== Cultural and literary allusions ==
- The cover of the book is a nod to an illustration in "Oliver Twist" by Charles Dickens.
- Prufrock Preparatory School is likely a reference to "The Love Song of J. Alfred Prufrock" by T. S. Eliot.
- Vice Principal Nero's name and his hobby of playing the violins are nods to Nero, the fifth Roman emperor and the legend that he fiddled while Rome burned.
- Duncan and Isadora Quagmire are named after the dancer, Isadora Duncan.

== Special editions ==
=== The Austere Academy: or, Kidnapping! ===
The Austere Academy; or, Kidnapping! was set to be a paperback release of The Austere Academy, designed to mimic Victorian penny dreadfuls. The book was set to include approximately seven new illustrations, and the fifth part of a serial supplement entitled The Cornucopian Cavalcade, which was to include a 13-part comic by Michael Kupperman entitled The Spoily Brats, and an advice column written by Lemony Snicket, along with other additions. However, for unknown reasons, this edition was never released.

== Audio book ==
An audio book of this novel was released. It was the last audio book that was read by the author, Daniel Handler, under the pseudonym of Lemony Snicket. All the succeeding audio books are read by Tim Curry.

== Translations ==
- Brazilian Portuguese: "Inferno no Colégio Interno" (Hell in the Boarding School), Cia. das Letras, 2000, ISBN 85-359-0274-0
- Finnish: "Omituinen opinahjo" (A Weird School), WSOY, 2004, ISBN 951-0-28566-8
- French: "Piège au collège" (Trap at School)
- Greek: "Η Άτεγκτη Ακαδημία" (The Inexorable Academy)
- Italian: "L'Atroce Accademia" ( The Atrocious Academy )
- Persian: "مدرسه سخت‌گیر" (The Strict School)
- Korean: "공포의 학교" (The School of Fear), Munhakdongnae Publishing Co, Ltd., 2004, ISBN 978-89-546-0838-1
- Japanese: "おしおきの寄宿学校" (The Punishing Boarding School), Soshisha, 2002, ISBN 4-7942-1173-2
- Norwegian: Den skrekkelige skolen (The Terrible School), Karoline Melli, Cappelen Damm, 2002, ISBN 9788202211530
- Russian: "Изуверский интернат" (Bigoted Boardinghouse), Azbuka, 2004, ISBN 5-352-00651-4
- Spanish: "Una academia muy austera" (A Very Austere Academy)
- Turkish: "Katı Kurallar Okulu" (School of Strict Rules)
- Polish : "Akademia antypatii" (The Academy of Antipathy)
- Thai: "โรงเรียนสั่นประสาท", Nanmeebooks Teen, 2003, ISBN 97-447-2836-1

== Adaptations ==
The opening of the novel was partially adapted during the closing moments of the first season of the television series adaptation by Netflix, with the remaining plot was adapted as the first and second episodes of the second season.

== See also ==
- Violet Baudelaire
- Klaus Baudelaire
- Sunny Baudelaire
- Count Olaf
- Lemony Snicket
- Arthur Poe
- Quagmire triplets
- Nero (A Series of Unfortunate Events)
