= Altered Images discography =

- Studio albums: 4
- EPs: 1
- Compilation albums: 8
- Singles: 11
- Box sets: 1

This is the discography of the Scottish new wave and post-punk band Altered Images.

== Albums ==
=== Studio albums ===
Title	Details	Peak chart positions				Certifications
Title	Details	UK	AUS	CAN	NZ	Certifications
Happy Birthday	Released: September 1981; Label: Epic; Formats: LP, MC	26	—	—	—	BPI: Silver
Pinky Blue	Released: 14 May 1982; Label: Epic; Formats: LP, MC	12	23	—	10	BPI: Silver
Bite	Released: 17 June 1983; Label: Epic; Formats: LP, MC	16	85	94	11	
Mascara Streakz	Released: 26 August 2022; Label: Cooking Vinyl; Formats: LP, CD, digital	28	—	—	—	
"—" denotes releases that did not chart or were not released in that territory.

=== Compilation albums ===
Title	Details
Collected Images	Released: May 1984; Label: Epic; Formats: LP, MC
The Best of Altered Images	Released: 9 November 1992; Label: Connoisseur Collection; Formats: CD, MC
Reflected Images - The Best of Altered Images	Released: 1 July 1996; Label: Epic; Formats: CD
I Could Be Happy – The Best of Altered Images	Released: 22 April 1997; Label: Epic/Legacy; Formats: CD; US-only release
Destiny – The Hits	Released: March 2003; Label: Epic; Formats: CD
Happy Birthday – The Best of Altered Images	Released: 16 July 2007; Label: Music Club Deluxe; Formats: 2xCD
The Collection	Released: 23 July 2010; Label: Sony Music; Formats: CD
Greatest Hits	Released: 29 March 2019; Label: Demon; Formats: LP

=== Box sets ===
Title	Details
The Epic Years	Released: 23 February 2018; Label: Cherry Red; Formats: 4xCD; Includes the three studio albums plus an album of extended mixes

== EPs ==
Title	Details
Greatest Original Hits	Released: March 1983; Label: Epic; Formats: 7", MC

== Singles ==
Single	Year	Peak chart positions								Album
Single	Year	UK	AUS	GER	IRE	NZ	SA	SWE	US Dance	Album
"Dead Pop Stars"	1981	67	—	—	—	—	—	—	—	Non-album single
"A Day's Wait"	1981	—	—	—	—	—	—	—	—	Happy Birthday
"Happy Birthday"	1981	2	23	56	3	—	2	16	—	Happy Birthday
"I Could Be Happy"	1981	7	30	—	13	4	—	—	45	Pinky Blue
"See Those Eyes"	1982	11	96	—	7	—	—	—	—	Pinky Blue
"Pinky Blue"	1982	35	—	—	24	—	—	—	—	Pinky Blue
"Song Sung Blue" (Continental Europe-only release)	1982	—	—	—	—	—	—	—	—	Pinky Blue
"Don’t Talk to Me About Love"	1983	7	58	—	6	6	—	—	—	Bite
"Bring Me Closer"	1983	29	—	—	17	47	—	—	—	Bite
"Love to Stay"	1983	46	—	—	—	—	—	—	—	Bite
"Change of Heart"	1983	83	—	—	—	—	—	—	—	Bite
"—" denotes releases that did not chart or were not released in that territory.

=== Other releases ===
Title	Year	Notes
Happy Birthday	1981	3-track Flexi disc released with Flexipop magazine no. 14. Tracks: "Happy New Year" (0:23), "Real Toys" (new version, 3:29) and "Leave Me Alone" (3:55)
"See Those Eyes"	1982	Flexi disc released with Trouser Press magazine. Tracks: "See Those Eyes" (extended version, 5:33), backed with "Daytime Logic" by Peter Baumann
"Little Town Flirt"	1982	Promotional single (duration: 2:43), backed with "Yakety Yak" by Bad Manners. From the soundtrack album for the 1983 film Party Party.
An Altered Image	1983	Flexi disc, titled An Altered Image, of a song titled "Move On Up", used in an advertising campaign by TSB and released by the bank with their 'Move On Up Pack'.
