= Clare Grogan =

Scottish actress and singer (born 1962)

- Grogan performing live with Altered Images at Band on the Wall in Manchester, England, 2026

Background information
- Also known as: C. P. Grogan
- Born: Claire Patricia Grogan; 17 March 1962 (age 64); Glasgow, Scotland
- Education: Glasgow College of Technology
- Genres: New wave; post-punk
- Occupations: Singer; actress; author
- Instrument: Vocals
- Works: With Altered Images
- Years active: 1979–present
- Label: London
- Member of: Altered Images
- Formerly of: Universal Love School

Claire Patricia Grogan (born 17 March 1962), known professionally as Clare Grogan or sometimes as C. P. Grogan, is a Scottish singer, actress, and author. She is best known as the lead vocalist of the 1980s new wave and post-punk band Altered Images, as well as for supporting roles in the coming-of-age romantic comedy film Gregory's Girl (1981), and the science fiction comedy programme Red Dwarf (1988–1993) as the first incarnation of Kristine Kochanski.

== Early life ==
Claire Patricia Grogan was born on 17 March 1962 in Glasgow. She, and her two sisters all attended the Notre Dame Convent School. Her mother was Irish and born in Dublin.

Aged 17, while she was dancing at the Glasgow College of Technology, a fight broke out nearby between patrons. Grogan attempted to head away from the violence but was injured by thrown broken glass, causing a deep facial wound and a prominent scar on the left side of her face. Grogan states her parents still find it hard to read about the incident. She began filming Gregory's Girl just three months after the incident. In 1998, while she was working in a theatre at Watford, it was discovered that part of the glass was still in the facial tissue and had to be surgically removed.

== Acting career ==
=== Theatre ===
As a member of Scottish Youth Theatre, she was originally obliged to appear as "C. P. Grogan" because there was already a member of Equity named Claire Grogan. (The other Claire Grogan went on to become a photographer.) She would later drop the i from her first name.

Grogan played the part of Rita in Educating Rita at Dundee Repertory Theatre in 1987.

In 1996, she played a fitness instructor on the Edinburgh Festival Fringe in the play Lady Macbeth Firmed My Buttocks.

=== Film and television ===
While working as a waitress at the Spaghetti Factory restaurant in Glasgow, she was spotted by film director Bill Forsyth. This led to her breakthrough acting role in 1981's Gregory's Girl as Susan. Because of her facial wound there were objections from the producers, but Forsyth refused to recast the role and Grogan was filmed mostly in profile. When filmed in close up, makeup artists covered Grogan's scar with Derma wax.

In 1984, she played Charlotte in Forsyth's Comfort and Joy. In 1985, she was the receptionist in the BBC Television version of Blott on the Landscape. Grogan appeared in the second episode of the acclaimed The Monocled Mutineer in 1986. She had a recurring role playing Dave Lister's would-be love-interest, Kristine Kochanski, in series 1, 2 and 6 of the programme Red Dwarf. However, she was later deemed too old for the role. Grogan has also appeared in the sitcom Father Ted (episode "Rock a Hula Ted") in a thinly veiled parody of Sinéad O'Connor and in the television soap opera EastEnders as Ian Beale's love interest, Ros Thorne (1997–1998).

In 1992, Grogan appeared as Mary Catto in series 8 episode 21 of the detective fiction television programme Taggart (again credited as C. P. Grogan).

She had the role of Maggie in a 1998 comedy Jilting Joe, played an eye surgeon in a 2002 short film Bury It, appeared in the medical soap opera Doctors in 2003, and performed another Edinburgh Festival Fringe play Forbidden in 2004, as Lily, married to a Second World War Nazi officer but falling in love with a young Jewish woman.

In 2006, Grogan portrayed Sandra Reeves, a control-freak office manager, in the film The Penalty King played Cathy in an episode of the BBC paranormal drama series Sea of Souls, and May, Danny's mother, in the Scottish sitcom Legit. She appeared in the music video for Peter Kay and Matt Lucas' charity single "I'm Gonna Be (500 Miles)", recorded for Comic Relief's Red Nose Day 2007, along with two TV films Wedding Belles and Forgiven.

In 2011, Grogan had a role in the teen drama television series Skins as Shelley, mother of Mini McGuinness and played Jenny Ferris in the Scottish gangster film The Wee Man in 2013.

She starred as Myriam in the 2017 film Delirium, filmed entirely at Royal Holloway, University of London.

Grogan co-presented, alongside the chef and author Gary Maclean, BBC Scotland's Corner Shop Cook-Off. The six episode series originally aired from 19 February to 25 March 2020.

== Music career ==
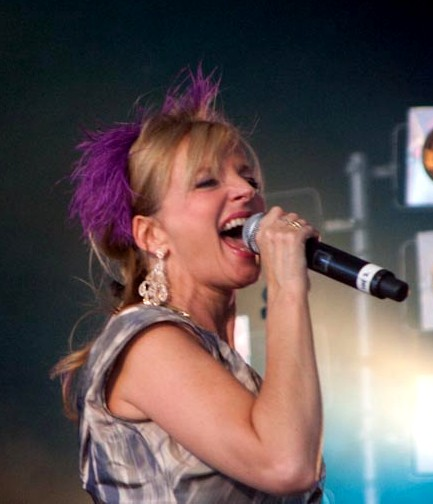
Grogan performing live with Altered Images at Ascot Racecourse in Ascot, England, 2009

Grogan developed her singing career as the lead singer of Altered Images, originally a five-piece band that included Johnny McElhone (later of the Scottish rock band Texas), whom she met while studying for her Highers exams. It became a four-person band with the departure of two members and the addition of Stephen Lironi, who played both guitar and drums. The band had several hits in the early 1980s, including "Happy Birthday", "I Could Be Happy", "See Those Eyes", and "Don't Talk to Me About Love". The band broke up after the release of their third studio album, Bite (1983).

In 1984, Grogan appeared in the music video to "Young at Heart" by the Bluebells.

Grogan later attempted a solo career, but after her debut single "Love Bomb" failed to gain chart success in 1987, her debut solo studio album Trash Mad was never released. Grogan formed Universal Love School in 1989 with Lironi, performing a series of gigs around the UK. However, it was short-lived and produced no hit singles. In 2000, she contributed vocals to the song "Night Falls Like a Grand Piano" on the 6ths' second and final studio album Hyacinths and Thistles. She recorded a cover version of "Angels with Dirty Faces" for the Frankie Miller tribute album. The track "Her Hooped Dream" appears on The Ultimate Celtic Album.

In 2002, Grogan performed as Altered Images on the Here and Now Tour which featured other well known artists from the 1980s. She performed on similar tours in 2005, 2008 and 2009. She appeared with Chesney Hawkes, Toyah Willcox and Limahl of Kajagoogoo as The 80s Supergroup in the 2011 series of Let's Dance for Comic Relief.

Grogan sometimes covers for radio presenters on BBC Radio 6 Music.

Grogan appeared in Series 2, Episode 2 of John Shuttleworth's Lounge Music on BBC Radio 4 on 27 November 2016.

Grogan began presenting shows on Absolute Radio 80s from 11 September 2017, presenting Monday to Thursday 8-9pm and Sundays 7-9pm.

In 2021, Grogan duetted with Sharleen Spiteri on the track "Look What You've Done", from Hi, the tenth studio album released by Johnny McElhone's band Texas.

== Writing ==
Grogan's first book was published in October 2008, a children's novel (aimed at age 7 and up) titled Tallulah and the Teenstars, about a girl, Tallulah Gosh, who forms a pop band.

In 2015, it was followed by Tallulah on Tour.

Tallulah Gosh was an alias Grogan thought of using at the start of her career because Equity had already registered a Claire Grogan and a more showbiz name might help her career, but Bill Forsyth persuaded her that she would come to regret it.

== Personal life ==
Grogan was the inspiration for the 1983 song "True" by the English pop band Spandau Ballet.

Grogan married bandmate Stephen Lironi in Glasgow in 1994. They live in Haringey in North London, and adopted a daughter in 2005.

== Filmography ==
List of acting performances in film and television
Title	Year	Role	Notes
Gregory's Girl	1981	Susan	film
Comfort and Joy	1984	Charlotte	film
Blott on the Landscape	1985	Hotel Receptionist	TV series
Sunday Premiere	1986		TV series
Red Dwarf	1988–1993	Kristine Kochanski	TV series
The Play on One	1990	Anne	TV series
Taggart	1992	Mary Catto	TV series
Scottish Passport	1994	Presenter	TV series
Relax	1994	The Career Girl	short
Father Ted	1996	Niamh Connolly	TV series
EastEnders	1997–1998	Ros Thorne	TV series
Jilting Joe	1998	Maggie	film
Bury It	2002	Eye Surgeon	short
Doctors	2003	Lou Matthews	TV series
The Afternoon Play	2004	Maw	TV series
Sea of Souls	2006	Cathy	TV series
The Penalty King	2006	Sandra Reeves	film
Wedding Bellas	2007	Customer Hair Salon	TV film
Forgiven	2007	Conference Chair	TV film
Legit	2007	May	TV series
Comedy Lab	2007	Sandra	TV series
Coming Up	2008	Fiona Baird	TV series
Sometimes	2011	Lizz McCall	short
Skins	2011–2012	Shelley McGuinness	TV series
Waterloo Road	2012	Sandra Gordon	TV series
The Wee Man	2013	Jenny Ferris	film
Six Degrees of Assassination	2014		film
Coffee and Cake	2014	Clare (segmant "Boy Toy")	short
Loyal	2014	Joyce	short
Lucky Break	2016	Angela	short
An Ordinary Monday	2017	Detective Young	short
Delirium	2017	Myriam	film
Still Game	2019	Herself	TV series
Lost at Christmas	2020	Anna	film
7 Miles Out	2026	Pamela Ryan	film

== Discography ==
With Altered Images

- Happy Birthday (1981)
- Pinky Blue (1982)
- Bite (1983)
- Mascara Streakz (2022)

Solo

- "Love Bomb" (1987)

== Written work ==
- Tallulah and the Teenstars (2008)
- Tallulah on Tour (2015)
