= 1212 (disambiguation) =

1212 may refer to:

- 1212
- 1212 (7L & Esoteric album), 2010
- 1212 (Barbara Manning album), 1997
