= The 6ths =

American musical group

- Genre: Indie pop
- Years active: 1993–2000
- Labels: Factory Too; Merge
- Members: Stephin Merritt
- Website: houseoftomorrow.com/6ths

The 6ths was a band created by Stephin Merritt, also the primary songwriter and instrumentalist behind the Magnetic Fields, the Gothic Archies, and Future Bible Heroes. In the group, Merritt wrote and played songs which were then sung, in most cases, by other artists—a different artist on each track. It produced two well-received studio albums and many different collaborations.

== Releases ==
The two albums the band released were Wasps' Nests in 1995 (Factory Too via London Records) and Hyacinths and Thistles in 2000. Wasps' Nests was preceded by a 7" vinyl single of album track "Heaven in a Black Leather Jacket" in 1993 on Merge Records that contains a B-side, "Rot in the Sun", sung by Merritt himself. The song was also later included on Merritt's Obscurities compilation in 2011.

The names of both albums, as well as the name of the band, are deliberate tongue-twisters. The words are chosen for their abundance of s and th sounds; sixths alone packs one th and three s sounds into one syllable. The band's website refers to the 6ths as "every lisper's nightmare".

The list of singers on Wasps' Nests includes many notable mid-90s indie-rockers, including Barbara Manning, Mary Timony, Dean Wareham (Galaxie 500, Luna, Dean & Britta), Lou Barlow, Chris Knox (Tall Dwarfs), Robert Scott (The Bats, The Clean), Georgia Hubley (Yo La Tengo), Amelia Fletcher (Heavenly), and Mark Robinson.

Some of the more notable artists appearing on Hyacinths and Thistles are Bob Mould, Sally Timms (The Mekons), Sarah Cracknell (Saint Etienne), Neil Hannon (The Divine Comedy), Gary Numan, Marc Almond, Momus, Clare Grogan (Altered Images), Melanie, Miss Lily Banquette (Combustible Edison), Katharine Whalen (Squirrel Nut Zippers) and the accomplished toy piano player Margaret Leng Tan. The album also features an improbable duet of singer Odetta accompanied by Lemony Snicket author Daniel Handler on accordion.

"Falling out of Love (with You)" from Wasps' Nests was featured on the popular 90's children's show The Adventures of Pete and Pete.

Two songs from Hyacinths and Thistles, "You, You, You, You, You" and "As You Turn To Go", are featured in the movie Pieces of April and its accompanying soundtrack by Stephin Merritt. "You, You, You, You, You" was featured in Google's 2016 pixel ad.

Their song "Night Falls Like a Grand Piano" was covered by South African group Wonderboom on their 2003 album Tell Someone Who Cares.

== Discography ==
=== Albums ===
- Wasps' Nests (1995)
- Hyacinths and Thistles (2000)

=== Singles ===
- "Heaven in a Black Leather Jacket" b/w "Rot in the Sun" (7" single) (1993)
- "San Diego Zoo" (Promotional Single) (1995)
