= Don't Talk to Me About Love =

Don't Talk to Me About Love may refer to:

- Don't Talk to Me About Love (song), a 1983 single by Altered Images
- Don't Talk to Me About Love (film), a 1943 German romantic drama film
