= Barbara Manning =

American musician

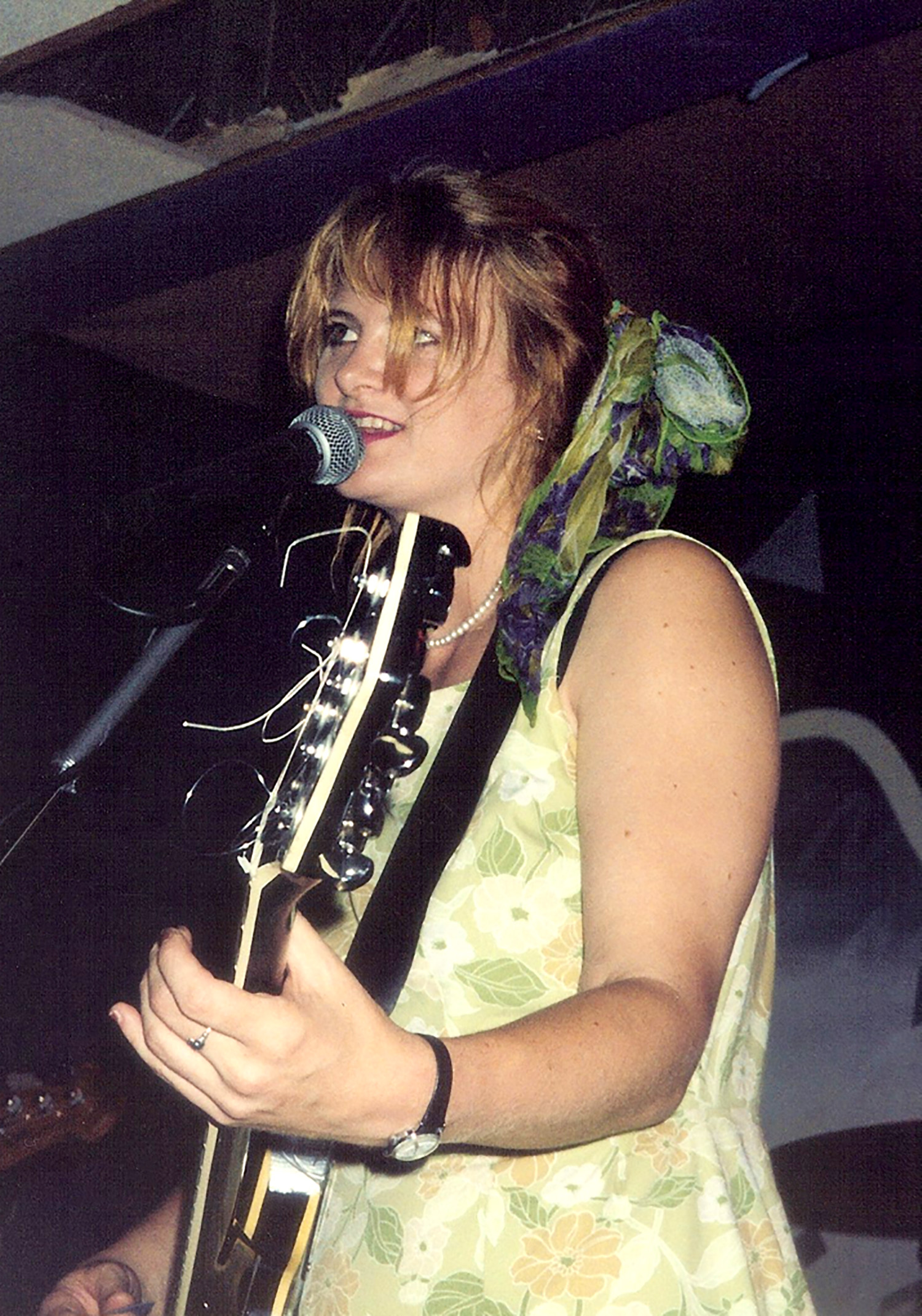
- Barbara Manning performing circa 1994

Background information
- Born: December 12, 1964 (age 61); San Diego, California, United States
- Genres: Indie rock, indie pop, lo-fi, folk rock
- Occupations: Singer-songwriter; Science teacher Drama Teacher
- Instruments: Vocals, guitar
- Years active: 1984–present
- Labels: (selected) Heyday, Matador, Innerstate
- Website: Barbara Manning

Barbara Manning (born December 12, 1964) is an American singer-songwriter and guitarist whose albums blend elements of rock, folk, pop and proto-punk. She is also known for her cover versions of often obscure pop songs. In addition to an acclaimed solo career, Manning has been active in a number of bands, including 28th Day (with Cole Marquis), World of Pooh, SF Seals, and The Go-Luckys!.

== Early life ==
Manning's parents met in high school but split up when she and her younger sister Terri were young. Her mom moved the girls to the Sierra Foothills, settling in a cabin without running water or electricity to live near a religious commune. Manning's early exposure to popular music came from her parents and their friends, who listened to The Beatles, Country Joe & the Fish, The Carpenters, The Moody Blues, Odetta, and Elton John. Manning bought her first guitar at age 14 and, inspired by The Bee Gees, began playing and practicing harmonies with her sister.

== Music career ==
=== 1980s: 28th Day and World of Pooh ===
While attending Chico State University in 1983, Manning played bass with guitarist/singer Cole Marquis and drummer Michael Cloward in the jangle-pop band 28th Day. They released a self-titled EP on the Enigma label. This was the only recording from the band before it split up in 1986, when Manning moved to San Francisco, but two expanded editions with outtakes and live recordings were re-released in 1992 and 2003.

28th Day's EP was produced by Russ Tolman, guitarist-songwriter of True West. In 1998, Tolman and musician/writer Pat Thomas formed their independent label Innerstate which would go on to release more Manning recordings, including the 28th Day – The Complete Recordings 2003 reissue. A Pitchfork review of this 20-song collection praised the timelessness of the 80s band, saying "...this stuff still sounds as beautiful and rich and satisfying as it ever did. Anthems of heartbreak, odes to inarticulatable sadness, paeans to the dead! Sandy Denny could have sung most of these tunes without breaking a Brit-folk sweat."

In 1986 Manning joined singer-songwriter and bassist Brandan F. Kearney's band World of Pooh. They released their only album The Land of Thirst on Kearney's Nuf Said label in 1989 (now out of print). Manning's own songs included "Scissors" and "Somewhere Soon;" both would be rerecorded for her upcoming solo album. She also shared some songwriting credits with Kearney.

Manning made her first solo album, Lately I Keep Scissors, recorded quickly in 1986 as an 8-track demo, which would eventually be released on Thomas' San Francisco label, Heyday in 1988. Terri Manning recorded some backing vocals and local musician friends pitched in, including drummer/singer Melanie Clarin, who would become a longtime collaborator on future projects. The songs ranged from personal laments to jagged folk-rock and pop, including "Every Pretty Girl," "Scissors," (with a percussive scissors track) and "Mark E. Smith & Brix," which referred to The Fall lead singer-songwriter and his former wife. Trouser Press praised Manning's song-craft, saying her solo work "reveal[s] a songwriter of tremendous lyrical power and breadth of sonic vision."

=== 1990s: SF Seals and solo career ===
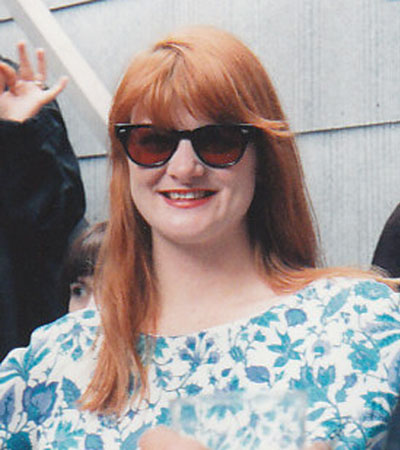
Barbara Manning, 1994

Rolling Stone took notice of Manning's musical output, calling her one of 1992's most important new artists. The World of Pooh lineup eventually morphed into a new band called The SF Seals with Manning as chief songwriter and singer. Band members included Melanie Clarin, cellist Kim Osterwalder, bassist Margaret Murray, and guitarist Lincoln Allen. Manning, a longtime baseball fan, named the band after the city's former Pacific Coast minor-league team. SF Seals released the EP Baseball Trilogy in 1993, most likely the first baseball-themed release in indie rock (not counting Manning's own 1991 mini-album One Perfect Green Blanket, whose songs are not baseball-themed but whose cover art is of a baseball field; its title refers to a baseball field). The three songs included a cover of Les Brown's "Joltin' Joe DiMaggio," the Mad V. Dog-penned "Ballad of Denny McLain," and Manning's "Dock Ellis," about Ellis' infamous 1970 no-hitter pitched while tripping on acid.

The band released their first album, Nowhere, on the Matador Records label in 1994 with guitarist Brently Pusser joining in the recording sessions. Their second album, Truth Walks in Sleepy Shadows, came out a year later. It made Spin Magazine's top ten list for 1995 and won a Bay Area Music Award (BAMMY) for best independent rock album. But the SF Seals wouldn't stay together past 1996.

Manning toured the U.S., both solo and with her various bands, throughout the 80s and 90s, opening for such acts as Yo La Tengo, Giant Sand, Pavement, Calexico, the Replacements, Richie Havens, Donovan, Television Personalities, Stuart Moxham (Young Marble Giants), Jon Langford (Mekons), Faust, Urge Overkill, Gary Lucas (Captain Beefheart), and Sonic Youth.

With the encouragement of fellow musician Alastair Galbraith, Manning traveled to New Zealand in 1997, touring with John Convertino and Joey Burns of Giant Sand and Calexico and collaborating with her favorite musicians from the underground scene there. Recording sessions commenced with musicians including David Kilgour of The Clean, Chris Knox of Tall Dwarfs, Graeme Downes of The Verlaines, Robert Scott of The Bats, and David Mitchell and Denise Roughan of The 3Ds. The resulting album, In New Zealand, was released in 1999.

Manning's solo album 1212 was released on Matador in 1997 with Burns and Convertino backing her. The album's 19-minute song cycle, "The Arsonist's Story" was conceived as a rock opera, told from the points of view of a troubled teenager and her equally troubled mother. Aside from the rock-opera aspect, the album paid tribute to Manning's fondness for Krautrock. "Stammtisch" lays lyrics in English and German over a jam based on a riff by German band Neu!, and a cover of Amon Düül's "Marcus Leid" was included as well. Several more diverse cover songs were featured, including Richard Thompson's "End of the Rainbow," The Bevis Frond's "Stain on the Sun," and an obscure Deviants' single from 1969, "First Line (Seven the Row)." A Salon review referred to Manning's ballad “Isn’t Lonely Lovely?” as the album's standout, describing her lyrics as being set to "a majestic, echoing landscape."

With her growing catalog, Option Magazine said she had "helped pioneer the type of lo-fi, post-modern folkstress approach later championed by [songwriters like] Juliana Hatfield and Liz Phair." But despite critical acclaim, Manning was dropped from Matador due to low album sales.

=== 2000–present: The Go-Luckys! and The Sleaze Tax ===
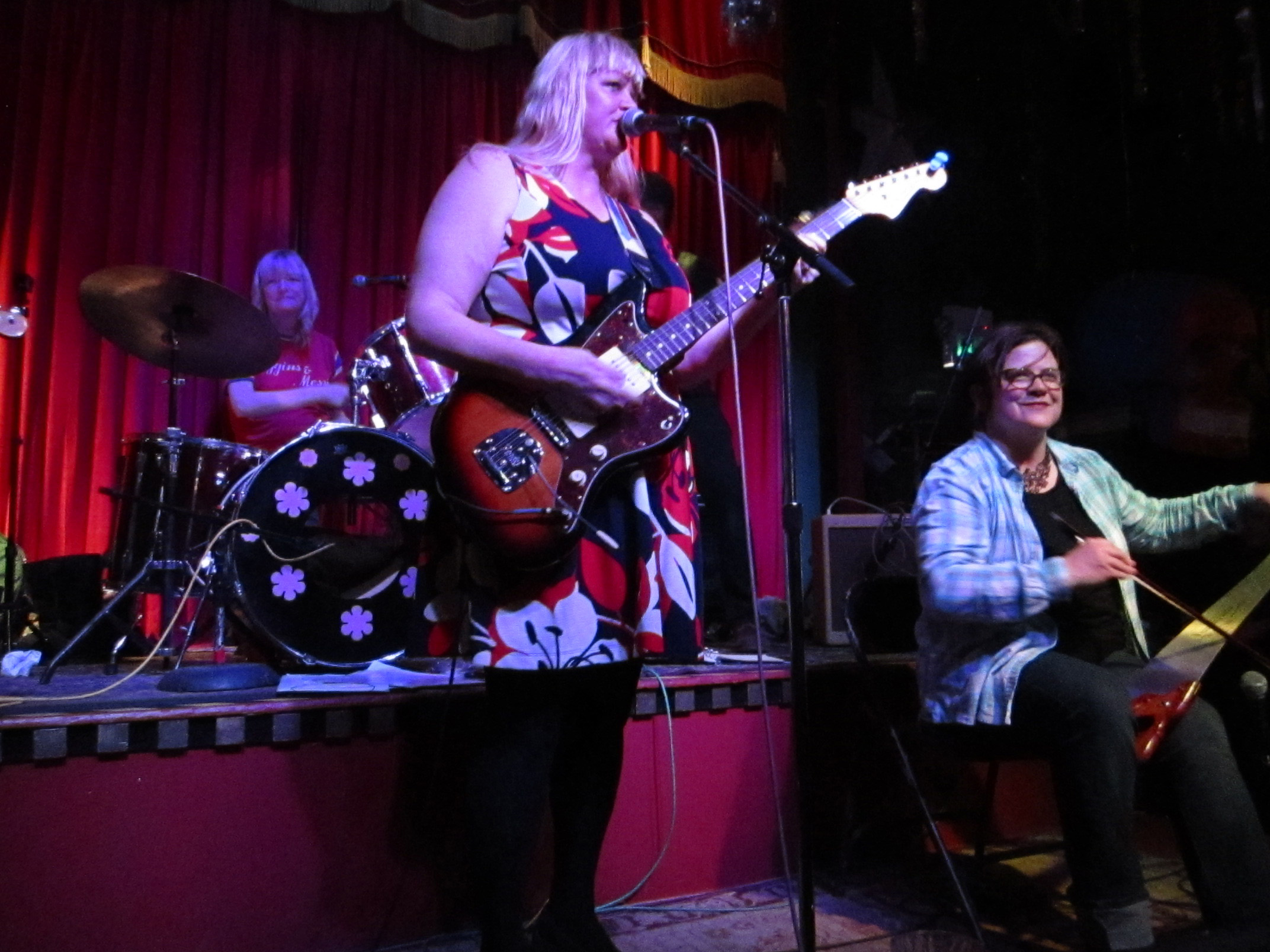
Barbara Manning with Melanie Clarin DeGiovanni and Terri Manning at the Make-Out Room, San Francisco, 2017

Manning lived in Stuttgart, Germany, where she had a strong fan base, from 1998 to 2001. During that time, she recorded and toured with her band The Go-Luckys!, its rhythm section made up of twin brothers, Flavio and Fabrizio Steinbach. In four years they released four albums, Homeless Is Where the Heart Is (2000), You Should Know by Now (2001), Transatlantic Trips (2002), One Starry Night At The Shop (2003), and one five-song EP, A Mountain.

While working on her degree in biology at California State University, Chico in 2008, Manning fronted a new rock band, The Sleaze Tax (a reference to creatures from the 1970s TV show Land of the Lost), with drummer Mike Erpino and bassist Jason Wooten. The band recorded some songs and played live on the west coast but no album was forthcoming. She also formed two short-lived bands, Champion, with guitarist Loki Miller and drummer Charles Mohnike, and Fiberglass Jacket, with drummer Justin "Dusty" Evans and guitarist Tom Little. She composed music for the Chico theater group The Blue Room, for a play based on Molière's The Misanthrope, with lyrics by playwright Lauren Goldman Marshall. Manning also hosted a weekly radio program called Radio Detour on listener-supported station KZFR.

=== Cover songs ===
In addition to being a highly regarded songwriter, Manning is known as an interpreter of other writers' songs. Artists she's covered include The Bats ("Smoking Her Wings"), Badfinger ("Baby Blue"), Jackson Browne ("These Days"), The Verlaines ("Joed Out"), Portastatic ("Through with People"), Tom Lehrer ("Rickety Tickety Tin"), and Les Paul and Mary Ford ("Blow the Smoke Away"). Manning sings "San Diego Zoo", the opening track on the 1995 album Wasps' Nests by Stephin Merritt's side project The 6ths. Her cover of Marianne Faithfull's "The Shalala Song" can be heard in Jon Moritsugu's 1994 film Mod Fuck Explosion.

Of her penchant for covering such a wide range of songs, she stated: "I listen to a lot of different types of music. I think that's why there's such a diverse bunch of covers...If I fall in love with a song, I'll make a tape of that one song and hear it 50 times in a row without having to rewind. Usually, all the covers I've done are songs that I've obsessed on."

== Personal life ==
Manning lives with her husband Dan Vargas, a music producer, in Long Beach, California. She teaches science at Hutchinson Middle School in Los Angeles County.

== Discography ==
=== Solo releases ===
- Lately I Keep Scissors (Heyday, 1988)
- One Perfect Green Blanket (Heyday, 1991)
- Barbara Manning Sings with the Original Artists – collaboration with Stuart Moxham of Young Marble Giants and Jon Langford of The Mekons (Feel Good All Over, 1995)
- 1212 (Matador, 1997)
- In New Zealand – collaboration with various musicians (Communion, 1999)

Collections

- One Perfect Green Blanket – CD release compiled with Lately I Keep Scissors (Heyday, 1993)
- Under One Roof: Singles and Oddities (Innerstate, 2000)
- Super Scissors – three-disc re-issue of Lately I Keep Scissors andOne Perfect Green Blanket with previously unreleased bonus tracks, outtakes and demos (Rainfall, 2008)
- Chico Daze – previously unreleased songs recorded in Chico, CA from 2004 to 2009, on Bandcamp, 2016

Singles

- Don't Let It Bring You Down b/w Haze Is Free (Mounting a Broken Ladder) (Forced Exposure, 1990)
- February 8, 1992 with Seymour Glass – "8s" and "CZC" (Majora, 1992)
- We Go Under with Flophouse – "B4 We Go Under" and "I Love You 1,000 Ways" (Teenbeat, 1993)

Compilations

- Heyday Acoustic Sampler 7-inch vinyl – cover of "These Days" by Jackson Browne (Heyday, 1989)
- Untitled 7-inch flexi-disc promo included in "The Bob" #57 – "Someone Wants You Dead" (1988)
- No Alternative Red Hot AIDS Benefit Series – "Joed Out" (Arista, 1993)
- Silver Monk Time: A Tribute to the Monks – listed as Barbara Manning & The Go Luckys! "I Can't Get Over You" (Play Loud! Productions, 2007)
- You Hit Me with a Flower (Redux) CD included in copies of Ptolemaic Terrascope #36 – listed as Barbara Manning and The Go Luckys! "Crazy Man Michael", a cover of a Fairport Convention song (2007)
- SCORE! 20 Years of Merge Records: The Covers – cover of Portastatic's "Through with People" (Merge, 2009)

=== Bands ===
28th Day

- 28th Day EP (Bring Out Your Dead/Enigma, 1985)
- 28th Day CD reissue with six bonus tracks (Skyclad, 1992)
- 28th Day – The Complete Recordings CD reissue with 13 bonus tracks (Innerstate, 2003)

World of Pooh

- The Land of Thirst (Nuff Sed, 1989)
- G.H.M. b/w Someone Wants You Dead 7-inch single (K Records, 1990)
- A Trip to Your Tonsils EP (Nuff Sed, 1991)

Barbara Manning & Seymour Glass

- February 8, 1992 7-inch EP (Majora, 1992)

Barbara Manning with Flophouse'

- Before We Go Under b/w I Love You a Thousand Ways 7-inch single, TeenBeat Records (1992)

SF Seals

- The Baseball Trilogy EP (Matador, 1993)
- Nowhere (Matador, 1994)
- Truth Walks in Sleepy Shadows (Matador, 1995)

SF Seals singles

- "Nowherica" b/w "Being Cheated" (SubPop, 1993)
- "Back Again" – Inside Dave's Garage Volume Five – split 7-inch with The Dambuilders' "Blockhead" (Radiopaque, 1994)
- "Still?" b/w "Don't Underestimate Me" (Matador, 1994)
- "Ipecac" b/w "How Did You Know?" (Matador, 1995)

Glands of External Secretion

- Northern Exposure Will Be Right Back (Starlight Furniture Company, 1995)

The 6ths

- Wasps' Nests – vocals for Stephen Merritt single, "San Diego Zoo" (London, 1995)

Barbara Manning and The Go-Luckys!

- Homeless Where the Heart Is (Innerstate, 1999)
- A Mountain EP (Supermodern, 2003)
- You Should Know By Now (Innerstate, 2001)
- Enjoy the Lonely Time (Innerstate, 2006)
