= Kim A. Tolman =

German designer

- Born: Kim Assing; Jever, Germany
- Occupations: Production designer, set designer, scenic designer, art director, painter
- Years active: 1992–present
- Website: www.kimtolmandesign.com

Kim A. Tolman is a production designer, set designer, scenic designer and fine art painter based in Southern California.

Tolman is a native of Jever, on the North Sea coast of Germany. She relocated to the United States in 2001.

== Early life ==
Born Kim Assing in Jever, Germany, she became interested in art and design as a young teen, which coincided with her involvement with punk rock. She was known locally for designing and constructing her own fashions.

After completing school, she became an apprentice then journeyman carpenter and furniture builder. She attended art and design school in Oldenburg, Germany, where she refined her skills.

She also got an early taste for film and art direction for the 1992 German art film Sommer der Liebe, directed by Wenzel Storch, a film which shows the influences of Salvador Dalí and Luis Buñuel. The film has been described as "something between a kinder-garden birthday-party and a harsh drug-trip with light splatter".

In 1996, after a short career as a restaurateur in the seaside village of Schillig, Tolman moved to Cologne, Germany, where she continued her painting, holding several exhibitions. She also worked as an extra and bit part actor in German TV and films. Tolman was also active in Cologne's theatre scene, doing scenic design and scenic art as the resident scenic designer for Opera Mobile and other productions, including Michel in Der Suppenschussel, a touring production that played in many German cities over several years.

In 2001, Tolman left Germany and relocated to San Francisco, California.

== U.S. life and work ==
In the period from 2001 to 2011, Tolman did scenic design for over 200 theatre productions in the San Francisco Bay Area. Her designs also graced stages in Portland, Oregon and Washington, DC. She is the recipient of numerous nominations and awards for her scenic design.

In 2011, she moved to Los Angeles where she has split her time between film work and design for themed entertainment. She was part of the team at Walt Disney Imagineering bringing Pandora–The World of Avatar to Walt Disney World in Florida. She also worked as production designer at NBCUniversal Creative on The Wizarding World of Harry Potter for the company's Universal Studios Hollywood theme park. She was attraction designer on the team at Universal Studios Japan that created Super Nintendo World.

Tolman designed the stage set for popular indie pop-folk duo The Weepies for their summer 2011 acoustic tour.

She was a contestant in 2012 on Hot Set, a Syfy Channel reality television game show, which pitted two production designers against each other to create a movie set in three days with a budget of $10,000.

In 2015, she was working with BRC Imagination Arts as the art director for the Museum of the Bible in Washington, DC, which opened in 2017.

In 2018, she worked for Universal Studios Japan with responsibility for design of the Super Mario portion of Super Nintendo Land.

In the period 2019 to 2021 Tolman worked on a series of TV ads for Pepsi and L'Oreal featuring Beyoncé. She was also production designer on other commercials for clients such as McDonald's.

In 2022 with a move to Palm Springs, Tolman shifted her professional focus back toward fine art painting that emphasizes her expressionistic, abstract use of color and texture.

In 2023, she opened MAD.KAT Gallery in nearby Rancho Mirage, with the aim of bringing international, national and local artists with a fresh perspective to greater Palm Springs and the Coachella Valley.

== Personal life ==
Kim A. Tolman is married to American singer-songwriter and music producer Russ Tolman. The two met in Cologne, Germany in 1998 and were married there in 2000. They reside in Palm Springs, California.
