= True West =

True West may refer to:

- True West (band), a Paisley Underground band that flourished in the early 1980s
- True West (play), a play by Sam Shepard
- True West Magazine, a magazine that began publication in 1953
