= I Could Be Happy =

1981 song by Altered Images

Single by Altered Images

from the album Pinky Blue
- B-side: "Insects"; "Disco Pop Stars" (12-inch only)
- Released: December 1981
- Genre: New pop
- Length: 3:28
- Label: Epic (UK); Portrait (US)
- Songwriter: Altered Images
- Producer: Martin Rushent

Altered Images singles chronology
"Happy Birthday" (1981)	"I Could Be Happy" (1981)	"See Those Eyes" (1982)

Music video
- "I Could Be Happy" on YouTube

"I Could Be Happy" is a song by Scottish new wave band Altered Images, released as the first single from their second album, Pinky Blue. Their second top-10 hit in the UK, the song peaked at number seven in January 1982, and remained on the chart for 12 weeks. It also reached the top 40 in Australia, Ireland, and New Zealand and was their first and only single to chart in the United States, on the Billboard Dance Club Songs chart at number 45 in April 1982.

== Music video ==
The music video for this song was directed by Tim Pope and a brief mainstay on MTV in its early days. MTV initially accidentally said the song was from their Happy Birthday album.

The band members are shown holding different pastel pieces and playing them like they were their musical instruments, and singer Clare Grogan is shown singing the "I could be happy, I could be happy" part in scenes where those lyrics are on the screen with a dot weirdly moving around, but hitting each syllable in time. Near the end, the band members put their pieces down to show it draws a very colorful happy face, then the video ends with Grogan riding out the song with the band playing their real instruments.

== Track listings ==
7-inch single

A. "I Could Be Happy"
B. "Insects"

12-inch single

A1. "I Could Be Happy"
B1. "Insects"
B2. "Disco Pop Stars"

== Charts ==
=== Weekly charts ===
Chart (1982)	Peak position
Australia (Kent Music Report)	30
Ireland (IRMA)	13
New Zealand (Recorded Music NZ)	4
UK Singles (OCC)	7
US Dance Club Songs (Billboard)	45

=== Year-end chart ===
Chart (1982)	Position
New Zealand (Recorded Music NZ)	32

== Certifications ==
Region	Certification	Certified units/sales
United Kingdom (BPI)	Silver	250,000^{^}
^{^} Shipments figures based on certification alone.
