= Hyacinths and Thistles =

Studio album by the 6ths
- Released: 2000
- Genre: Indie pop
- Length: 60:54
- Label: Merge
- Producer: Stephin Merritt

The 6ths chronology
Wasps' Nests (1995)	Hyacinths and Thistles (2000)

Professional ratings
Aggregate scores
Source	Rating
Metacritic	68/100
Review scores
Source	Rating
AllMusic	3/5 stars
Entertainment Weekly	A−
The Guardian	4/5 stars
Los Angeles Times	4/4 stars
Pitchfork	6.0/10
Rolling Stone	3/5 stars
Spin	6/10

Hyacinths and Thistles is the second and final studio album by the indie pop band the 6ths. It was released in 2000 on Merge Records.

== Track listing ==
All tracks written by Stephin Merritt.

#	Song title	Time	Singer
1.	"As You Turn to Go"	1:59	Momus
2.	"Give Me Back My Dreams"	3:06	Sally Timms
3.	"He Didn't"	2:30	Bob Mould
4.	"I've Got New York"	2:12	Melanie
5.	"Just Like a Movie Star"	4:11	Dominique A
6.	"Kissing Things"	2:28	Sarah Cracknell
7.	"Lindy-Lou"	1:45	Miho Hatori
8.	"Night Falls Like a Grand Piano"	2:35	Clare Grogan
9.	"The Dead Only Quickly"	1:03	Neil Hannon
10.	"The Sailor in Love with the Sea"	2:41	Gary Numan
11.	"Volcana!"	3:05	Marc Almond
12.	"Waltzing Me All the Way Home"	1:51	Odetta
13.	"You You You You You"	3:10	Katharine Whalen
14.	"Oahu"	28:10	Miss Lily Banquette
