= Wasps' Nests =

Studio album by the 6ths
- Released: 1995
- Recorded: Let's Rain
- Genres: Alternative rock; pop
- Length: 45:17
- Labels: London; Factory Too; FACD-2.06
- Producer: Stephin Merritt

The 6ths chronology
Wasps' Nests (1995)	Hyacinths and Thistles (2000)

Singles from Wasps' Nests
- 1. "Heaven in a Black Leather Jacket" Released: 1993; 2. "San Diego Zoo" Released: 1995

Wasps' Nests is the 1995 debut album by the 6ths, a side-project created by Stephin Merritt of the Magnetic Fields. Merritt wrote and recorded the album, inviting different vocalists to sing lead. Like the band's name, the album title is a tongue-twister.

"Yet Another Girl" originally only appeared on the vinyl release of the album, but was later included on Merritt's 2011 compilation Obscurities.

== Critical reception ==
Professional ratings
Review scores
Source	Rating
AllMusic	4.5/5 stars
Chicago Tribune	3.5/4 stars
Entertainment Weekly	A
The Guardian	3/5 stars
NME	6/10
Pitchfork	8.5/10
Rolling Stone	4/5 stars
(The New) Rolling Stone Album Guide	3/5 stars
Spin	8/10
Spin Alternative Record Guide	8/10

The Record wrote that Merritt "is well-suited to the Phil Spector-esque role of songwriter and producer, and his singleminded songwriting is well-served by the album's eclectic personnel; on the whole, Wasps' Nests is a delight."

== Track listing ==
All tracks are written by Stephin Merritt

No.	Title	Singer	Length
1.	"San Diego Zoo"	Barbara Manning	3:22
2.	"Aging Spinsters"	Stephin Merritt	2:20
3.	"All Dressed Up in Dreams"	Mary Timony	2:55
4.	"Falling Out of Love (With You)"	Dean Wareham	2:55
5.	"Winter in July"	Ayako Akashiba	2:32
6.	"Pillow Fight"	Mitch Easter	2:34
7.	"Dream Hat"	Mac McCaughan	2:27
8.	"Movies in My Head"	Georgia Hubley	4:19
9.	"In the City in the Rain"	Lou Barlow	3:43
10.	"Looking for Love (In the Hall of Mirrors)"	Amelia Fletcher	2:43
11.	"Heaven in a Black Leather Jacket"	Robert Scott	2:46
12.	"Here in My Heart"	Anna Domino	3:30
13.	"Puerto Rico Way"	Mark Robinson	3:28
14.	"You Can't Break a Broken Heart"	Jeffrey Underhill	3:16
15.	"When I'm Out of Town"	Chris Knox	2:34
16.	"Yet Another Girl"	Stuart Moxham	3:30
