= Russ Tolman =

American singer-songwriter (born 1956)

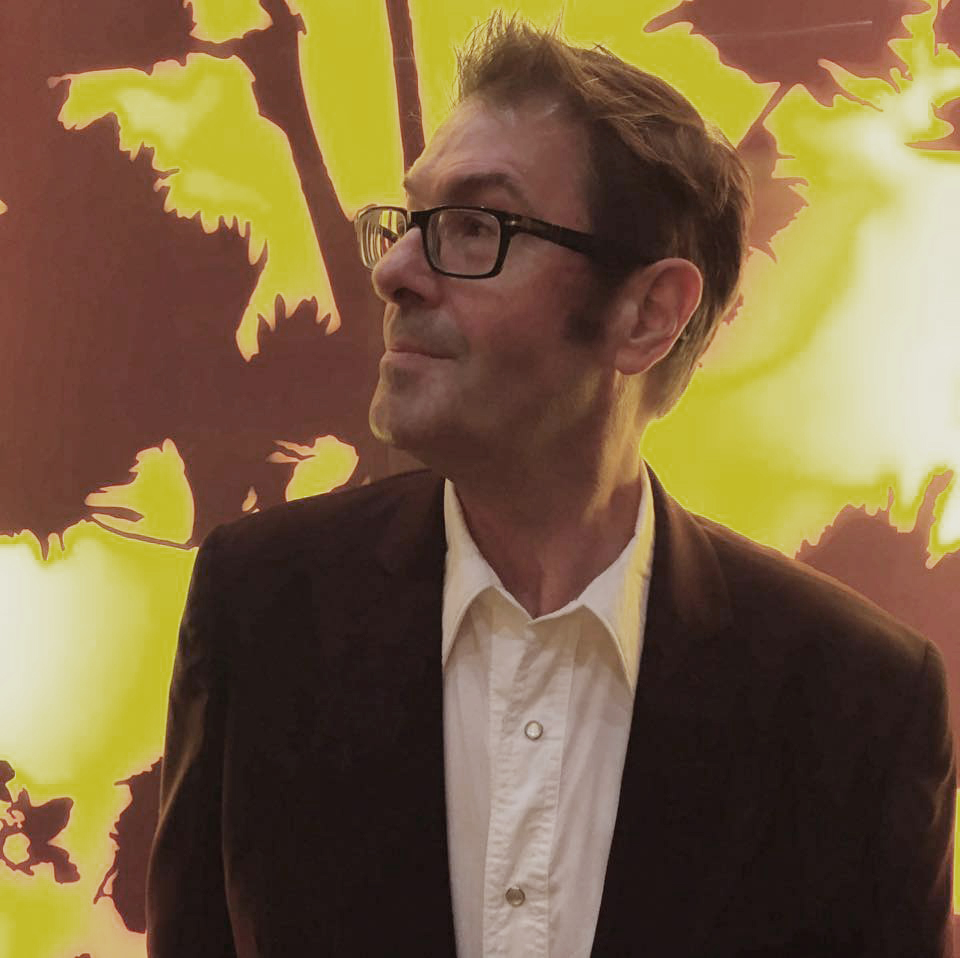

Background information
- Born: August 15, 1956 (age 69)
- Genres: Folk rock, singer-songwriter
- Instrument: Guitar
- Years active: 1978–present
- Labels: LOST, 304 Stainless, WEED, Innerstate, Blue Rose, New Rose, PIAS, Demon/Zippo
- Spouse: Kim A. Tolman (m. 2000)
- Website: russtolmanmusic.com

Russ Tolman (born August 15, 1956) is a singer-songwriter who came to international attention in the 1980s as guitarist, songwriter, and producer of True West, a band associated with the Paisley Underground.

== Early life and career ==
Tolman was born August 15, 1956, and raised in Northern California. His father was a sheep rancher, and his mother was a former burlesque dancer who worked during World War II as a "Rosie the Riveter". He is the grandson of noted psychologist Edward C. Tolman, and great-nephew of Manhattan Project physicist Richard C. Tolman.

While attending school at University of California, Davis, Tolman was a DJ at the student radio station KDVS, where he met a pre-Dream Syndicate Steve Wynn and Kendra Smith, who were also disc jockeys at the station. Together in 1978 they formed Suspects, which was touted as Davis's first New Wave band. Answering a classified ad in The California Aggie was drummer Gavin Blair (who would later be lead singer in True West) and bassist Steve Suchil. Active until 1980, when Wynn and Smith returned to Southern California to attend UCLA, Suspects played many of the Northern California punk and new wave venues of the day including San Francisco's Mabuhay Gardens and The Deaf Club and UC Davis's Coffeehouse. They released a 45 RPM single, "Talking Loud" b/w "It's Up To You," in 1979.

Following the breakup of Suspects, Tolman began playing with Sean O'Brien in The Meantime, which also featured bassist Rick Gates, son of David Gates of Bread. The elder Gates produced Tolman's song "Two For One" for the band's self-released 7-inch EP in 1981.

From 1979 until 1983, Tolman worked as a disc jockey at progressive country station KYLO in Davis, where he developed a love for classic honky tonk, western swing, and folk under the tutelage of music director Gordy Broshear, formerly of genre pioneers KFAT.

By 1982, The Meantime had changed their name to True West and Gavin Blair had replaced Sean O'Brien as lead singer. The band went on to coalesce around Blair, Tolman, and guitarist Richard McGrath and record two well received albums, which allowed the band to tour constantly in the US and Europe from 1983 through early summer 1985, including accompanying R.E.M. as opening act on their Fables of the Reconstruction tour.

In summer 1985, True West and Tolman parted ways.

== Solo recording career ==
Tolman started work on his first solo album Totem Poles And Glory Holes, which was released in 1986 on UK label Zippo/Demon Records. The album was released in the U.S. the next year on Down There/Restless Records and received many positive reviews including being named New York Times music critic Robert Palmer's "Rock Album of the Week" in the May 29, 1987 Times, as well as making that writer's and many other's year-end "Best Of" list.

Tolman left Davis for Los Angeles at the end of summer 1986, where he helped manage Steve Wynn's Down There Records label, releasing albums by Tolman, The Romans, Divine Weeks, Top Jimmy & The Rhythm Pigs, Doctor's Children, and others via a distribution deal with successful independent label Restless Records.

Tolman did his first U.S. tour with a band that featured bassist David Provost (Dream Syndicate, The Droogs, Phil Seymour, Holly and the Italians), former True West drummer Frank French (later of Cake), and San Francisco guitarist Jeff Kane.

In 1988, Tolman recorded Down In Earthquake Town, which was the first of a series of albums he made at Westbeach Recorders with engineer (and sometimes co-producer and co-writer) Brett Gurewitz, founder of Bad Religion and Epitaph Records. This album was released in Europe on Zippo/Demon Records and in the U.S. on Skyclad Records. Tolman supported this album with a U.S. tour with a band that included keyboardist Robert Lloyd, bassist Brian Mazur, guitarist Jeff Kane, and drummer Dave Drewry. Johnette Napolitano of Concrete Blonde, credited as the Strawberry Neapolitan Singers, lends background vocals to the album. Tolman makes vocal noises on the title song of Concrete Blonde's 1989 album Free.

Goodbye Joe was released in 1990 on Skyclad Records and on France's New Rose Records. The record was recorded at Westbeach Recorders with the nucleus of bass player Provost and drummer Drewry, then fleshed out with the contributions of lead guitarist Jon Klages (The Individuals, The Richard Lloyd Band) and multi-instrumentalist Robert Lloyd. It was after the release of this album that Tolman began frequent tours in Europe joining Steve Wynn and his band as solo opener for their 1990 tour of France, Spain, and Italy.

Tolman particularly was drawn to Scandinavia, looking to relocate to Oslo, Norway. With this plan in mind, Tolman based his recording band for 1992's Road Movie around drummer Ned Leukhardt (Wall of Voodoo) who had relocated to Scandinavia with the demise of Wall of Voodoo in 1988. With Brett Gurewitz in the co-producer's chair, the album features a core band of Leukhardt on drums, bassist David Provost, Jon Klages on guitar with guest appearances by Green on Red's Chris Cacavas on organ, Robert Lloyd on mandolin and accordion, Chris Bauer steel guitar, and The Long Ryders's Sid Griffin on backing vocals. The album was released in Europe on New Rose Records.

Around this time, Tolman toured Belgium, the Netherlands, and Denmark with John Wesley Harding. Earlier, he had done a winter tour of Spain with Harding, Steve Wynn, Chris Cacavas, and Giant Sand.

In 1992, Russ contributed background vocals on Steve Wynn's album Dazzling Display.

Sweet Spot was Tolman's fourth album released 1994 on his own Brilliant label via several European record companies including PIAS. Once again recorded in Los Angeles at Westbeach Recorders, Sweet Spot featured a band that included guitarist Kirk Swan (Dumptruck), drummer Dave Drewry, bass player Nino Del Pesco, multi-instrumentalist Robert Lloyd (Steve Wynn, John Wesley Harding, Carlene Carter, Amy Rigby), and Canadian vocalist Wendy Bird (Barney Bentall).

Late in 1996, Tolman left Los Angeles for San Francisco. Living in the Mission District, he wrote his next album City Lights. During this time he made frequent trips to Portland, Oregon to work with songwriter/drummer Jim Huie on Huie's Girls Say Yes project that featured Huie's songwriting and drumming with vocals by Huie and several other Portland artists. Notably, True West guitarist Richard McGrath lends his considerable guitar talents to the project. Canadian songstress Wendy Bird also appears. The album was recorded with engineer Mike Demmers at Desitrek Studios. Tolman would later go on to record and mix part of his City Lights at this studio.

City Lights was also recorded in San Francisco with engineer Chris Von Sneidern with Steve Wynn co-producing several songs that include Linda Pitmon on drums, pianist Robert Lloyd, and Doug Freeman on bass. Guitarist Jeff Kane (who died from cancer in 2012) also participated in the album, both playing guitar and engineering overdubs. The album was mastered by the late Doug Sax and released on Germany's Blue Rose Records in 1998.

Tolman followed up the City Lights release with two tours of Europe. First in May and June 1998, he was solo opening act for The Cole Porters featuring his friend Sid Griffin playing in Germany and the UK. Tolman returned for a Fall 1998 tour with a band that featured guitarist Jeff Kane, drummer Jim Huie, and Portland bass player Roland Couture. It was on this tour in Cologne, Germany that Tolman met his future wife Kim Assing (now noted Hollywood production designer Kim A. Tolman).

In addition to songwriting and performing, Tolman has a keen interest in music production, having produced records for Barbara Manning's first band 28th Day, The Windbreakers, The Downsiders, The Popealopes, Lost Durangos, and others. In 1998, he started Innerstate Records, along with Pat Thomas. The label was active in the San Francisco Bay Area till 2006 with nearly 100 releases and spawned offshoot labels InnerSpace and WEED (which released albums by Thomas's band Mushroom). During the early 2000s, Tolman also worked as a reissue producer, overseeing re-releases from Willie Nelson, Bob Marley, Waylon Jennings, Lead Belly, Patsy Cline, and others.

In 2000, Tolman released New Quadraphonic Highway, which he recorded almost entirely in his Haight Ashbury district bedroom. It featured guest appearances by John Wesley Harding, Chuck Prophet, Tom Heyman, and Dale Duncan of Map of Wyoming and Flying Color.

In 2006, Tolman joined Gavin Blair, Richard McGrath, and True West newcomers Jim Huie, and bassist Ian Barrett for a series of True West reunion shows, which included several dates as opening act for old friends Violent Femmes, playing at venues such as San Francisco's legendary Fillmore Ballroom and the House of Blues at Downtown Disney, Anaheim.

In 2011, Tolman and wife Kim left the SF Bay Area to relocate in Los Angeles. Tolman reformed the Russ Tolman Band shortly after, featuring Kirk Swan on guitar, drummer Dave Drewry, Robert Lloyd on organ, bassist Dave Provost, and new addition Carl Byron on piano. They recorded and released the digital single "Los Angeles" in 2013.

In 2016, Tolman released the singles "Time Flies," "Everybody's Gonna Love Me," and "Vancouver Sun" on the 304 Stainless label.

Tolman released in 2017 a 20-song, 27-year retrospective album (CD and digital) entitled Compass & Map that covers the years 1986 to 2013 and includes songs from his previous seven albums, plus the best of his digital singles.

In 2019, Tolman's eighth solo album Goodbye El Dorado was released.

== Personal life ==
In 2000, Tolman married Kim Assing (now Kim A. Tolman) in Cologne, Germany. They currently reside in Los Angeles, where Kim works as a production designer and art director for film and themed entertainment. She is also a fine art painter.

== Discography ==
Russ Tolman with True West

- True West EP 1983 Bring Out Your Dead (USA)
- Hollywood Holiday 1983 New Rose (F)
- Drifters LP 1984 Zippo (UK) resp. PVC / Passport (USA)
- TV Western 1990 LP / CD CD Skyclad (USA)
  Side A: EMI Records-demos recorded Dec. 1983 @ Bearsville Studios, produced by Tom Verlaine, Side B: Live at Rex Club, Paris France May 1985
- Best Western CD Skyclad 1988 (USA) (Rarities, outtakes)
- West Side Story LP / CD 1989 Skyclad (USA) (Rarities, outtakes)
- Hollywood Holiday Revisited CD 2006 Atavistic (USA) (reissue of first two albums, along with the 1983 demos produced by Tom Verlaine at Bearsville Studios.
- The West Is History: Live At The House of Blues 2011 DVD Atavistic Video (USA)

Russ Tolman solo

- Totem Poles and Glory Holes LP 1986 Down There-Restless Records(USA) & Demon (UK)
- Down in Earthquake Town LP 1988 Skyclad (USA) & Demon (UK)
- Goodbye Joe LP /CD 1990 New Rose (F) & Skyclad (USA)
- Road Movie CD 1992 New Rose (F)
- Sweet Spot CD 1994 Red River (Germany)
- City Lights CD 1998 Blue Rose (Germany)
- New Quadraphonic Highway CD 2000 WEED (USA), Blue Rose (Germany)
- "Los Angeles" Digital Single 2013 Innerstate (USA)
- "Time Flies" Digital Single 2016 304 Stainless (USA)
- "Everybody's Gonna Love Me" Digital Single 2016 304 Stainless (USA)
- "Vancouver Sun" Digital Single 2016 304 Stainless (USA)
- Compass & Map CD/digital album 2017 LOST (USA)
- Goodbye El Dorado CD/digital album 2019 LOST (USA), Blue Rose (Europe)

Russ Tolman – Compilations & Special Releases

- Various Artists - Only 39,999,999 Behind Thriller LP Down There/Restless Records 1989. Russ plays "Talking Hoover Dam Blues"
- Various Artists –Live At The Kremlin Volume One LP/CD New Rose Records ROSE247 1991 (Concert highlights 13.–16. November 1990 in Espace André Malraux, Kremlin-Bicètre, 10th anniversary celebration of New Rose Records, Russ Tolman plays „Vegas“)
- Live At The Shop Cassette RUSS 01 1992 Get Happy!! Records (Live Concert 11. November 1992 at Get Happy! Plattenladen, Frankfurt am Main, limited to 20 copies)
- Various Artists - 39 Steps to Seattle 1995 Zippo/Demon Records. Russ Tolman plays "Everything You Need And Everything You Want"
- Various Artists - This Note's For You Too!: A Tribute To Neil Young (Inbetweens/Innerstate Records 1999). Russ Tolman & Richard McGrath play "Old Man"

Russ Tolman as Producer

- 28th Day -28th Day LP 1985 Bring Out Your Dead/Enigma Records
- Lost Durangos - Evil Town LP 1986 Armadillo Records (Canada)
- The Downsiders – All My Friends Are Fish LP 1988 Mammoth Records (USA) (Russ Tolman plays lead guitar on "She’s Alright")
- The Popealopes – An Adder's Tale LP 1988 Skyclad (USA) & Resonance (NL)
- Giant Sand - "Change Is Now" Time Between – A Tribute to The Byrds CD 1989 Communion Records (USA), Imaginary Records (UK)
- The Popealopes – Kerosene LP 1990 Skyclad (USA)
- The Windbreakers - Electric Landlady LP 1991 DB Records (USA)

== Videography ==
- True West - The West Is History: Live at The House of Blues (DVD, 2011)
- Various Artists - Frozen Ghosts VHS 1989 Iceworld Video. Contain's Russ Tolman's video for "Domino."
- Various Artists - Slipping Through The Cracks VHS 1988 Iceworld Video. Contains Russ Tolman's video for "Talking Hoover Dam Blues"
