= Truth Walks in Sleepy Shadows =

Studio album by SF Seals
- Released: 1995
- Studio: Lowdown
- Label: Matador
- Producer: Greg Freeman, SF Seals

SF Seals chronology
Nowhere (1994)	Truth Walks in Sleepy Shadows (1995)

Truth Walks in Sleepy Shadows is the second and final album by the American band SF Seals, released in 1995. It was a loose song cycle about the ocean. The band supported the album by playing shows with Chris Knox.

The album won a Bammy Award, in the "Outstanding Alternative Album" category. It was a commercial disappointment.

== Production ==
Truth Walks in Sleepy Shadows was produced by Greg Freeman and SF Seals. It was less of a band effort than the debut, and more of a Barbara Manning solo effort. Eleven musicians played on the album, which showcased a version of psychedelic music. It includes covers of John Cale, Faust, and Pretty Things songs. Drummer Melanie Clarin and bass player Margaret Murray left the band after the recording sessions.

== Critical reception ==
Professional ratings
Review scores
Source	Rating
AllMusic	4.5/5 stars
Chicago Tribune	3.5/4 stars
Robert Christgau	(1-star Honorable Mention)
MusicHound Rock: The Essential Album Guide	3.5/5 stars
Spin	9/10

Stereo Review stated that "the sound might be described as garage-folk; the scruffy arrangements show traces of 'Louie Louie' consciousness, but the band is working to enhance the vocals instead of drowning them out, no doubt realizing how grabbing and unguarded Manning's voice is." The Chicago Reader wrote that Manning's "striking originals are fraught with numbing self-doubt, despair, and darkness, yet her confused narrators never ask for pity or wallow in moroseness." Nashville Scene called the album "equal parts neo-psychedelia and hypnotic, Velvet Underground-influenced droning à la New Zealand bands like the Bats and the Clean."

Trouser Press opined that "the production is lovely—the vibraphones on 'Ladies of the Sea' and calliope on 'Kid's Pirate Ship' are especially nice—and Manning's songs are simple and sweet." Spin determined that "there's a tension to Truth Walks that aurally enacts the meetings, clashes, and merges that are Manning's subjects"; the magazine later listed it as the 8th best album of 1995. The Chicago Tribune praised the cover of Faust's "Flashback Caruso", writing that "Manning's band mates, particularly bassist Margaret Murray, weave an opulent tapestry of musical colors."

AllMusic wrote that "it's probably Manning's darkest record, with rich and varied arrangements that add trumpet, vibes, strings, even calliope ... to the acoustic guitar-based songs, and lyrics heavy on the disturbing metaphors." In 2001, The Village Voice deemed Truth Walks in Sleepy Shadows "probably the most accomplished work of a scene that disdained craftsmanship."

== Track listing ==
No.	Title	Length
1.	"S.F. Sorrow (Is Born)"
2.	"Ladies of the Sea"
3.	"Ipecac"
4.	"Locked Out"
5.	"Bold Letters"
6.	"Flashback Caruso"
7.	"Pulp"
8.	"Soul of Patrick Lee"
9.	"Kid's Pirate Ship"
10.	"How Did You Know?"
11.	"Stellar Lullabye"
