= Innerstate Records =

Record label

- Company type: Private
- Industry: Music
- Genre: folk rock, country rock, alternative rock, Americana (music)
- Founded: 1998
- Founder: Russ Tolman, Pat Thomas
- Headquarters: San Francisco, California; Berkeley, California; Oakland, California, Palm Springs, California, USA
- Area served: Worldwide
- Key people: Russ Tolman, Pat Thomas
- Divisions: innerSPACE, WEED

Innerstate Records (also known as Innerstate) is a San Francisco Bay Area based rock and alternative American record label founded by Russ Tolman and Pat Thomas in 1998.

== History ==
Formed in 1998 by singer/songwriters and producers Russ Tolman and Pat Thomas, Innerstate Records continues today distributing its catalog as a digital label via distributor The Orchard. It spawned two offshoot labels innerSPACE, which specialized in space rock, prog and krautrock and WEED, which was a catch-all for eclectic releases. The labels releases both new recordings and reissues, but is not actively soliciting to sign new acts.

== Artists ==
- 28th Day
- Green on Red
- Mushroom (innerSPACE & WEED)
- Steve Wynn
- Penelope Houston
- Barbara Manning & The Go-Luckys
- Chris Cacavas
- Chris Von Sneidern
- Tom Heyman
- The Wags
- Daevid Allen's University of Errors (innerSPACE)
- Dipstick (WEED)
- Kim Fowley (WEED)
- Brian Ritchie (WEED)
- Petty Booka (WEED)
- Epic Soundtracks
- El Destroyo (Innerstate & WEED)
- Okra All-Stars
- Gary Floyd
- Sister Double Happiness
- The Handsome Family
- Donner Party
- The Walkabouts
- Tishamingo
- Sonya Hunter
- Map of Wyoming
- Jill Olson
- Go Go Market
- Russ Tolman (WEED)
- Rockin' Teenage Combo (innerSPACE)
- Om Attack (innerSPACE)
- Species Being (innerSPACE)
- Sid Hillman Quartet
- Girls Say Yes
- Schramms
- Jean Caffeine
