= Happy Birthday (Altered Images song) =

1981 single by Altered Images

Single by Altered Images

from the album Happy Birthday
- B-side: "So We Go Whispering"; "Jeepster"
- Released: August 1981
- Studio: Genetic (Berkshire, UK)
- Genre: New wave; pop; synth-pop; twee pop
- Length: 3:00
- Label: Epic
- Songwriter: Altered Images
- Producer: Martin Rushent

Altered Images singles chronology
"A Day's Wait" (1981)	"Happy Birthday" (1981)	"I Could Be Happy" (1981)

"Happy Birthday" is a song by Scottish band Altered Images, released as a single from their 1981 album of the same name. The song entered the UK charts in September 1981 and peaked at number two the following month, holding that position for three weeks. It was the 15th-best-selling single in the UK in 1981 and has been certified silver by the British Phonographic Industry (BPI) for sales in excess of 250,000 copies.

"Happy Birthday" is the only song on the album that was produced by Martin Rushent, who had already scored major success that year producing for the Human League and would win the Producer of the Year award for 1981 at the BPI Awards. Accordingly, the band chose Rushent to produce their next album, Pinky Blue (1982), in its entirety.

== Track listings ==
7-inch single

A. "Happy Birthday"
B. "So We Go Whispering"

12-inch single

A1. "Happy Birthday"
B1. "So We Go Whispering"
B2. "Jeepster"

== Personnel ==
- Clare Grogan – lead vocals
- Jim McKinven, Tony McDaid – guitars
- Johnny McElhone – bass
- Tich Anderson – drums

== Charts ==
=== Weekly charts ===
Chart (1981–1982)	Peak position
Australia (Kent Music Report)	23
Ireland (IRMA)	3
South Africa (Springbok Radio)	2
Sweden (Sverigetopplistan)	16
UK Singles (OCC)	2
West Germany (GfK)	56

=== Year-end charts ===
Chart (1981)	Position
UK Singles (OCC)	15

Chart (1982)	Position
South Africa (Springbok Radio)	14

== Certifications ==
Region	Certification	Certified units/sales
United Kingdom (BPI)	Silver	250,000^{^}
^{^} Shipments figures based on certification alone.

== Cover versions ==
"Happy Birthday" has been covered by the Ting Tings for the children's television show Yo Gabba Gabba! in 2008, by the Wedding Present for their 1993 compilation album John Peel Sessions 1987–1990, and by Thomas Fagerlund (The Kissaway Trail) with Christian Hjelm (Figurines) for the Danish radio programme Det Elektriske Barometer (The Electric Barometer) in 2010.
