= Pinky Blue =

Studio album by Altered Images
- Released: 14 May 1982
- Studio: Genetic Sound, Berkshire
- Genre: Pop; new wave
- Label: Epic (UK) Portrait (US) Vinyl 180 (LP reissues)
- Producer: Martin Rushent

Altered Images chronology
Happy Birthday (1981)	Pinky Blue (1982)	Bite (1983)

Pinky Blue is the second album by the Scottish new wave band Altered Images. It was released in May 1982 and featured the hit singles "I Could Be Happy", "See Those Eyes" and "Pinky Blue".

== Overview ==
The album reached No. 12 on the UK Albums Chart, while the singles charted well, with "I Could Be Happy" peaking at No. 7, "See Those Eyes" at No. 11 and "Pinky Blue" at No. 35 on the official singles chart. This was to be their highest placed album in the charts and was certified silver by the BPI for sales of over 60,000 copies. The style of the album moved further away from their post-punk roots and further into pop music, aided by their decision to include a cover version of Neil Diamond's MOR hit "Song Sung Blue", which was released as a fourth single only in Holland. The album was produced by Martin Rushent, who had already produced the band's successful 1981 hit single "Happy Birthday", though this would be their last project with him.

The album was re-issued on compact disc twice in the 1990s as straight album reissues, then by Edsel Records in 2004 as Pinky Blue...Plus with added bonus tracks. The album was newly remastered and re-issued again in March 2017, this time on 180-gram black vinyl LP containing a bonus 7" single on blue vinyl. It was then released as a deluxe 2 LP edition with additional bonus tracks in May 2017. The tracks/versions from the colored 7" included with the first vinyl reissue remain exclusive to that release. The original U.S. edition of the album differed from the original UK edition by including an exclusive extended mix of the single "See Those Eyes". Other countries, such as Australia and Spain, included the band's previous hit single "Happy Birthday" as part of a re-shuffled running order on the LP.

== Critical reception ==
Professional ratings
Review scores
Source	Rating
AllMusic	4/5 stars
Classic Pop	4/5 stars
Smash Hits	3 1/2/10
Uncut	3/5 stars

Reception for the album was mixed, bordering on negative. Melody Maker criticised the album for being overly commercial, Sounds claimed that it lacked soul, and Smash Hits' Neil Tennant deemed it a "big disappointment".

Retrospectively, AllMusic praised the singles "I Could Be Happy" and "See Those Eyes", but added that the inclusion of "Song Sung Blue" was "a mistake."

== Track listing ==
All tracks composed by Altered Images, except where indicated.

Side one

1. "Pinky Blue" (3.10)
2. "See Those Eyes" (3.10)
3. "Forgotten" (2.39)
4. "Little Brown Head" (2.42)
5. "See You Later" (3.16)
6. "Song Sung Blue" (Neil Diamond) (4.14)

Side two

1. "Funny Funny Me" (3.24)
2. "Think That It Might" (2.52)
3. "I Could Be Happy" (Dance Mix) (5.38)
4. "Jump Jump" (3.11)
5. "Goodnight and I Wish" (4.06)

CD bonus tracks (2004)

1. "I Could Be Happy" (7" Version) (3.32)
2. "Insects" (3.31)
3. "Disco Pop Stars" (2.35)
4. "Happy New Year - Real Toys" (New Version) (3.52)
5. "See Those Eyes" (Dance Mix) (5.32)
6. "How About That Then (I Missed My Train)" (3.24)
7. "Pinky Blue" (Dance Mix) (4.57)
8. "Jump Jump - Think That It Might" (Segued Dance Mix) (6.01)

Bonus colored 7" from LP reissue (2017)

1. "I Could Be Happy" (Single version)
2. "Insects" (re-recorded Martin Rushent version)

Bonus LP from double vinyl reissue (2017)
Side one

1. "See Those Eyes (Dance Mix)"
2. "Pinky Blue (Dance Mix)"
3. "Disco Pop Stars"

Side two

1. "Jump Jump - Think That It Might (Dance Mix)"
2. "How About That Then (I've Missed My Train)"
3. "See Those Eyes (U.S. Extended Version)"

== Personnel ==
Altered Images

- Clare Grogan - vocals
- Michael "Tich" Anderson - drums
- Tony McDaid - guitar
- Johnny McElhone - bass
- Jim McKinven - guitar

with:

- John Peel, Martin Rushent - backing vocals, whistling

Technical

- Martin Rushent - producer, engineer
- Dave Allen - assistant engineer
- David Band - direction
- Eric Watson, Chris Webster, Peter Anderson - photography
