= Altered Images =

Scottish new wave/post-punk band

Background information
- Origin: Glasgow, Scotland
- Genres: New wave; post-punk
- Works: Discography
- Years active: 1979–1983; 2012; 2021–present
- Labels: Epic; Diablo; Portrait
- Spinoffs: Hipsway; One Dove; Texas; The Wake
- Members: Clare Grogan; Steve Lironi
- Past members: Johnny McElhone; Tony McDaid; Michael Anderson; Gerard McInulty; Jim McKinven; David Bone
- Website: alteredimages.band

Altered Images are a Scottish new wave and post-punk band who found success in the early 1980s. Fronted by lead vocalist Clare Grogan, the group branched into mainstream pop music, having six UK top-40 hit singles and three top-30 albums from 1981 to 1983. Their hits include "Happy Birthday", "I Could Be Happy", "See Those Eyes", and "Don't Talk to Me About Love".

== History ==
=== Early career ===
Former schoolmates in Glasgow with a shared interest in the UK post-punk scene, Clare Grogan (vocals), Gerard "Caesar" McInulty (guitar), Michael "Tich" Anderson (drums), Tony McDaid (guitar), and Johnny McElhone (bass guitar), were all members of the Siouxsie and the Banshees official fan club. When they learnt the Banshees were going to play in Scotland, they sent a demo tape to Billy Chainsaw, who managed the official Siouxsie fan club, with a note asking "can we support them on tour?" The Banshees gave the band a support slot on their Kaleidoscope British tour of 1980. Altered Images's name referred to a sleeve design on the Buzzcocks' single "Promises", and was inspired by Buzzcocks vocalist Pete Shelley's constant interfering with the initial sleeve designs.

After being championed by BBC Radio 1 DJ John Peel, for whom they recorded a radio session in October 1980, they garnered enough attention to be offered a recording contract with Epic Records, but mainstream success was not immediate; their debut single, "Dead Pop Stars", reached only number 67 in the UK Singles Chart, while its successor, "A Day's Wait" stalled outside the top 100. "Dead Pop Stars" was particularly controversial at the time, sung from the viewpoint of a "has-been" icon with irony, but badly timed in its release shortly after John Lennon's death, even though the song was written and performed before his death. A dance remix of it with different lyrics was recorded and released as the 1982 single "Disco Pop Stars". (Both were absent from their studio album releases, but made it onto later anthologies.) After these singles and their first two sessions for John Peel, Caesar left and formed The Wake.

=== Chart success ===
With additional guitarist Jim McKinven (formerly of Berlin Blondes), they recorded their debut album, Happy Birthday (1981), largely produced by Steven Severin of Siouxsie and the Banshees. The band also worked briefly with producer Martin Rushent for the title track, which became the band's third single and their biggest hit. The song reached number 2 in the UK (for three weeks) in October 1981, catapulting the band to fame. They quickly became established as a major new wave act, and were subsequently voted Best New Group at the NME Awards and Most Promising New Act in the 1981 Smash Hits readers poll.

After a successful headlining tour, the band retained Rushent as their producer and released their second album, Pinky Blue, in May 1982. It reached the top 20 of the UK Albums Chart and provided three more top-40 hit singles with "I Could Be Happy", "See Those Eyes", and the title track, but was perceived as a disappointment by the British press. "I Could Be Happy" was the group's only foray onto the US charts, with the single peaking at number 45 on the Billboard Dance Chart.

Later that year, after McKinven and Anderson left to be replaced by multi-instrumentalist Steve Lironi (formerly of Restricted Code), the band began working on their third album with producer Mike Chapman. The collaboration provided them with another Top 10 hit, "Don't Talk to Me About Love", in spring 1983 and the subsequent album, Bite, was released in June. Half of the album was produced by Chapman, and half by Tony Visconti. Although it reached the top 20 of the UK Albums Chart, the album sold less than the band's two previous offerings (which had both earned a Silver disc). Before breaking up later that year, Altered Images went on another concert tour that included the band's American debut at the Golden Bear in Huntington Beach, California, on Thursday, 11 August 1983.

=== Break-up ===
Lironi formed Flesh after Altered Images split up. Grogan and Lironi (who eventually married) formed Universal Love School in the mid-1980s, performing together but never releasing any recordings. Grogan then attempted a solo career, signing to London Records in 1987 and releasing a single, "Love Bomb". Grogan was also included on a London Records compilation album titled Giant, contributing the track "Reason Is the Slave". After "Love Bomb" failed, plans for a follow-up single release, titled "Strawberry", and an album, Trash Mad, were shelved by London Records. Johnny McElhone went on to perform with Hipsway and eventually Texas, while McKinven became part of the 1990s group One Dove with Dot Allison.

Grogan sang live under the name Altered Images in 2002 for the Here and Now Tour, showcasing a revival of popular bands of their era alongside the Human League, ABC, and T'Pau, and again for some separate shows in 2004.

Grogan also became a film and television actress. Prior to finding fame with Altered Images, she had appeared in the 1981 film Gregory's Girl. Afterwards she appeared in Red Dwarf (in which she originated the role of Kristine Kochanski), EastEnders, Father Ted, and Skins. In recent years, she has also become a presenter on UK television, as well as a children's novelist. Grogan performed again in 2012 under the name Altered Images at Butlins Holiday Resort in Minehead on 11 May and at The Assembly in Leamington Spa on 12 May 2012. Also in 2012, Grogan put together a new all-female version of Altered Images and performed at the Rebellion Festival. She again fronted Altered Images in Series 5 Episode 5 (December 2019) of The Quay Sessions on BBC Scotland.

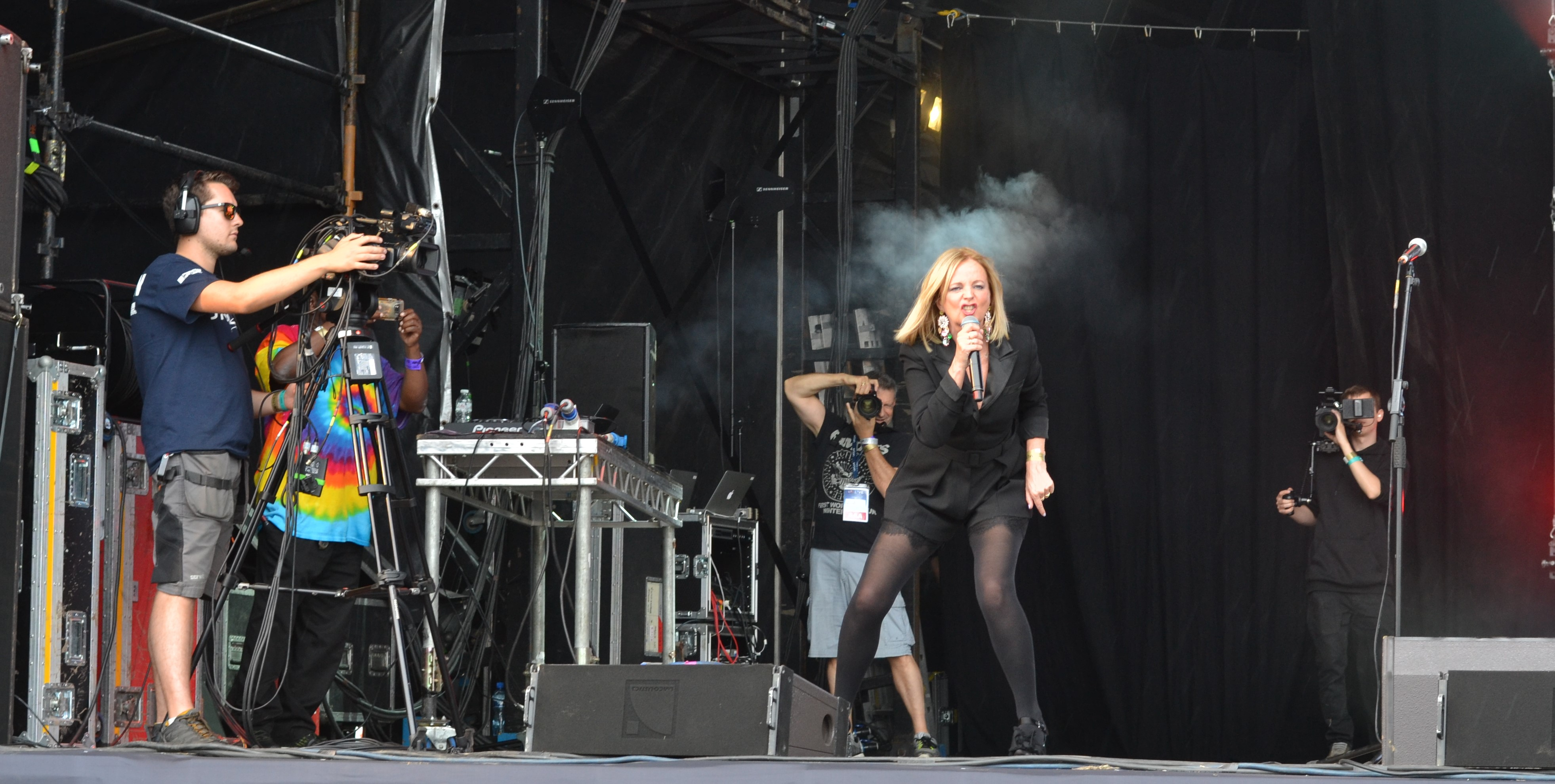
Grogan performing with Altered Images in 2019

In 2021, Grogan duetted with Sharleen Spiteri on the track "Look What You've Done", from Hi, the tenth album released by Johnny McElhone's band Texas.

In late 2021, Grogan led a reformed line-up of Altered Images, supporting the Human League during their 'Dare 40' UK Tour 2021.

=== Mascara Streakz ===
In December 2021, Grogan announced that the first Altered Images album in over 38 years would be released in 2022, titled Mascara Streakz. The album has been recorded for Cooking Vinyl Records. Grogan and Lironi recorded the album with Bobby Bluebell from the Bluebells and Bernard Butler, formerly of Suede and McAlmont & Butler, and it will have tracks co-written with Johnny McElhone (who was the Altered Images' original bass player). Mascara Streakz was released on 26 August 2022, and reached the Top 30 in the UK Albums Chart.

== Discography ==
- Happy Birthday (1981)
- Pinky Blue (1982)
- Bite (1983)
- Mascara Streakz (2022)
