= Bite (Altered Images album) =

Studio album by Altered Images
- Released: 17 June 1983
- Recorded: October 1982 – March 1983
- Genres: Pop; new wave; disco
- Label: Epic (UK) Portrait (US)
- Producers: James Stroud, Mike Chapman, Tony Visconti

Altered Images chronology
Pinky Blue (1982)	Bite (1983)	Mascara Streakz (2022)

Singles from Bite
- 1. "Don't Talk to Me About Love" Released: 1983; 2. "Bring Me Closer" Released: 1983; 3. "Love to Stay" Released: 1983; 4. "Change of Heart" Released: 1983

Professional ratings
Review scores
Source	Rating
AllMusic	4.5/5 stars
Classic Pop	3/5 stars
Smash Hits	5/10
Uncut	5/5 stars

Bite is the third studio album by the Scottish new wave band Altered Images, released on 17 June 1983 by Epic Records in the UK, and Portrait Records in the US. Produced by Mike Chapman and Tony Visconti, it features the UK top ten single "Don't Talk to Me About Love" as well as other singles: "Bring Me Closer", "Love to Stay" and "Change of Heart". It would be the band's last album for almost 40 years.

== Overview ==
This album followed the success of their previous two albums as well as a number of hit singles in the UK. For this album, the group recorded with producer Mike Chapman between October and December 1982 and then with Tony Visconti in March 1983. The resulting album was a change in direction from the group's earlier post-punk route, becoming a more polished pure pop sound. This direction was controversial with the group's fanbase, and although the album peaked in the UK top 20 (#16), it sold less than the group's previous two albums, both of which had been certified silver by the BPI. Some countries released the album with the single edit of "Don't Talk to Me About Love" in place of the longer UK LP version.

The first single, "Don't Talk to Me About Love", reached #7 in the UK, becoming one of the group's biggest hits, although further releases became less and less popular ("Bring Me Closer" UK #29, "Love to Stay" #46, "Change of Heart" #83). Soon after the final single and the group completed a UK tour, they disbanded.

Originally released on vinyl album and cassette, the album was later re-issued on compact disc in 2004 with several bonus tracks as Bite...Plus. This version substituted a 'live' version of "Another Lost Look", which had been featured originally on the B-side to "Love to Stay", and failed to include the original album version. Also, it included the single versions of "Don't Talk to Me About Love" and "Change of Heart" in place of the full-length LP versions, as well as single version of "Love to Stay" where originally an extended version of the track had appeared on the vinyl album, although the extended version does appear at the end of the CD issue. The album was newly remastered and re-issued again in March 2017 on 180-gram black vinyl LP, which included all the correct versions of the songs, and also included a bonus 7" on white vinyl. It was then reissued again by the same label (Vinyl 180) in July 2017 as a 2-LP set containing other period rarities, though not the songs from the bonus 7" of the previous edition.

== Track listing ==
All tracks composed by Altered Images

Side one

1. "Bring Me Closer" – 3:17
2. "Another Lost Look" – 3:26
3. "Love to Stay" – 5:36 (3:23 on Bite...Plus)
4. "Now That You're Here" – 4:43

Side two

1. "Don't Talk to Me About Love" – 4:50 (3:48 on Bite...Plus)
2. "Stand So Quiet" – 4:23
3. "Change of Heart" – 3:43 (3:35 on Bite...Plus)
4. "Thinking About You" – 5:02

CD bonus tracks

1. "Surprise Me" – 3:04
2. "I Don't Want to Know" – 3:48
3. "Last Goodbye" – 3:20
4. "Bring Me Closer" (Dance Mix) – 6:14
5. "Don't Talk to Me About Love" (Extended Version) – 7:01
6. "Love to Stay" (Dance Mix) – 5:40

Bonus 7" on colored vinyl (2017)

1. "Don't Talk to Me About Love" (Single Edit)
2. "Love to Stay" (Single Edit)

Bonus LP (2017)
Side one

1. "Don't Talk to Me About Love" (Extended Mix)
2. "Another Lost Look" (Live Studio Version)

Side two

1. "Bring Me Closer" (Extended Mix)
2. "Surprise Me"
3. "I Don't Want to Know"
4. "Last Goodbye"

== Personnel ==
Altered Images

- Clare Grogan – lead vocals
- Johnny McElhone – bass
- Stephen Lironi – drums
- Tony McDaid – guitar

with:

- Peter Vettese – keyboards
- Holly Beth Vincent – Farfisa organ on "Change of Heart"
- Andy Hamilton – saxophone
- Bernie Michael, Leroy Osbourne, Morris Michael, Annie, Mark, Mo – backing vocals

Technical

- Bryan Evans – engineer (tracks 1, 4, 6, 8)
- Robin Black – engineer (tracks 2, 3, 5, 7)
- Tony Visconti – producer and string arrangements (tracks 1, 4, 6, 8)
- Mike Chapman – producer (tracks 2, 3, 5, 7)
- Altered Images / Martyn Atkins – artwork and design
- Neil Kirk – cover photography

== Charts ==
=== Weekly charts ===
Chart (1983–84)	Peak position
Australian Albums (Kent Music Report)	85
Canada Top Albums/CDs (RPM)	94
New Zealand Albums (RMNZ)	11
UK Albums (Official Charts)	16

=== Year-end charts ===
Chart (1983)	Position
New Zealand Albums (RMNZ)	43
