= Wenzel Storch =

German filmmaker

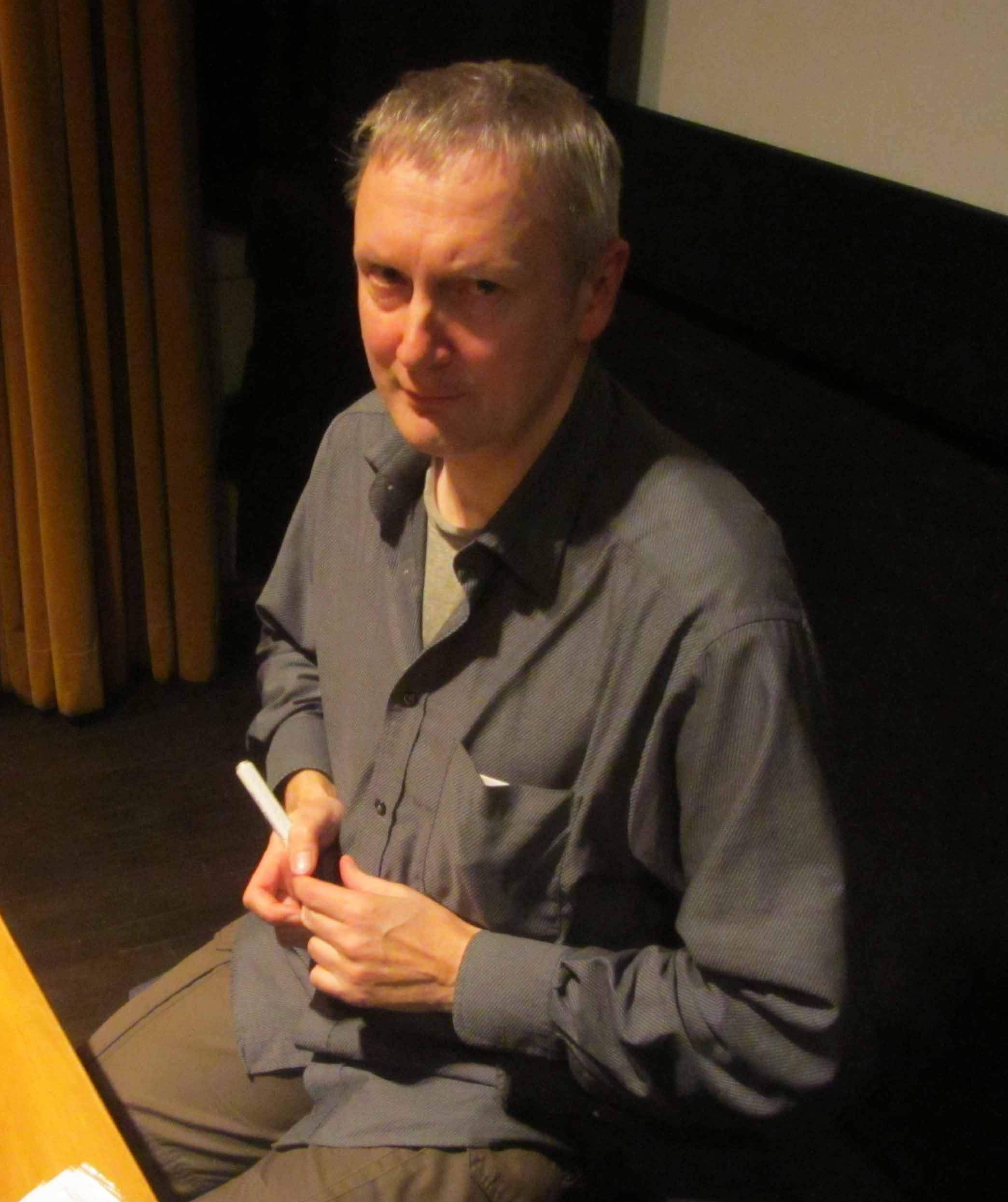
- Born: 21 March 1961 (age 64); Braunschweig, West Germany
- Occupation(s): Film director, producer, screenwriter, author
- Years active: 1980s–present

Wenzel Storch (born 21 March 1961) is a German film director, producer, and writer. His low-budget fantasy films tend to be critical towards the church and are filled with weird characters and settings as well as violence and bodily fluids.

== Films ==
- Autohüpfen und Ommas ärgern (1987)
- Der Glanz dieser Tage (1989)
- Sommer der Liebe (1993)
- Die Reise ins Glück (Journey into bliss) (2004)
