= 1212 (Barbara Manning album) =

Studio album by Barbara Manning
- Released: 1997
- Label: Matador
- Producer: Barbara Manning, Joey Burns, John Convertino, Craig Schumacher, Jim O'Rourke

Barbara Manning chronology
Barbara Manning Sings with the Original Artists (1995)	1212 (1997)	In New Zealand (1999)

1212 is an album by the American musician Barbara Manning, released in 1997. The title of the album refers to Manning's birthday.

Manning supported the album by opening for Yo La Tengo on a North American tour.

== Production ==
Manning's backing band was anchored by the rhythm section of Joey Burns and John Convertino, of Calexico. The album begins with a four-part song suite about a young arsonist, his parents, and the consequences of his actions; Jim O'Rourke worked on its mix. 1212 was recorded in Tucson, with additional work done in Chicago.

Among 1212's covers are songs by Amon Düül, the Bevis Frond, Tom Lehrer, the Deviants, and Richard Thompson. "Blood of Feeling" adds new lyrics to a song Manning wrote with her first band, 28th Day.

== Critical reception ==
Professional ratings
Review scores
Source	Rating
AllMusic	4.5/5 stars
Chicago Tribune	3.5/4 stars
The Encyclopedia of Popular Music	4/5 stars
Entertainment Weekly	B+
Lincoln Journal Star	4.5/5 stars
The Tampa Tribune	3.5/4 stars

No Depression thought that "key to the disc’s excellent musicianship is Manning’s collaboration with Joey Burns and John Convertino of Giant Sand and Calexico, whose multi-instrumental backup is typically innovative and free of grandstanding." Salon concluded that, "unlike gloomsters like Nick Cave, Manning doesn't distance herself from the misery of the characters in her songs—she collapses that distance, moving right in like a zoom lens to show us what makes these people tick." Entertainment Weekly opined that "material by such fellow iconoclasts as Richard Thompson and ’50s satirist Tom Lehrer show off Manning’s considerable interpretive gifts." The Lincoln Journal Star stated that "a take on the Deviants' 'First Line (Seven the Row)' gets much of its ominous tension from Manning's deadpan vocals and the Moog synthesizer."

The Hartford Courant praised "the desperate, evocative 'Isn't Lonely Lovely'. 'You wanted to be alone/Now you are ... it's a fine life, really,' she sings mournfully. She can't even convince herself of that, but Manning does prove yet again that she's expert at revealing the richness of sorrow, and digging through the shadows in the dark."

The Chicago Reader thought that Manning "sings with assured ease; and although there are some pretty flourishes, such as the mariachi horns on 'Stain on the Sun', the album favors spare, efficient production." Nashville Scene determined that, "harmonically, the music resembles the garage folk-rock of the mid- to late ’60s; to post-punk ears, it comes off as an amalgam of ’80s neo-psychedelia and New Zealand guitar-pop." The Chicago Tribune declared that, "with horns and keyboards tastefully filling out the arrangements and the Giant Sand rhythm section of John Convertino and Joey Burns in peak form, Manning has made one of the strongest albums in her 12-year career."

AllMusic wrote that "the achievement of 1212 isn't simply that it's made up largely of Manning originals, but that chief among them is her most ambitious creation to date, a stunning four-part mini-rock opera known collectively as 'The Arsonist Story'."

== Track listing ==
No.	Title	Length
1.	"The Arsonist Story": 1. "Fireman"; 2. "Evil Plays Piano"; 3. "Evil Craves Attention/Our Son/10 X 10"; 4. "Trapped and Drowning"
5.	"End of the Rainbow"
6.	"Blood of Feeling"
7.	"Rickity Tikity Tin"
8.	"Stain on the Sun"
9.	"Isn't Lonely Lovely?"
10.	"That Kid"
11.	"First Line (Seven the Row)"
12.	"Marcus Leid"
13.	"Stammtisch"
