= True West (band) =

Guitar band

- True West, 1984 backstage Los Angeles

Background information
- Origin: Davis, California
- Genres: Paisley Underground
- Years active: 1981–1987; 2006–present
- Labels: Bring Out Your Dead, New Rose, PVC, Atavistic
- Members: Russ Tolman; Gavin Blair; Richard McGrath; Jim Huie; Ian Barrett
- Past members: Jozef Becker; Frank French; Ken Lacewell; Sean O'Brien; Steve Packenham; Kevin Staydohar

True West is a guitar band, often considered part of the Paisley Underground. Singer Gavin Blair and guitarists Richard McGrath and Russ Tolman are the nucleus of the group.

== History ==
=== Origins ===
Originally from California's Sacramento Valley, True West were contemporaries and friends with Los Angeles bands such as The Dream Syndicate, Green on Red, Rain Parade, Thin White Rope, and The Long Ryders. From 1979 to 1981, Gavin Blair and Russ Tolman (guitar) had been bandmates in The Suspects, a Davis-based band, with a pre-Dream Syndicate Steve Wynn and Kendra Smith.

In 1981, Tolman joined a band in Davis called The Meantime, which included Sean O'Brien (lead vocals, guitar), Rick Gates (bass, vocals, guitar), and Kevin Vanderhoof (drums; now Kevin Wilkins). The Meantime released a 7" self-titled EP with three songs, one of which was produced by David Gates of the band Bread.

The Meantime changed its name to True West later in 1981, at Tolman's urging. O'Brien left True West in January 1982, and apart from Tolman, the band had changed personnel completely by the time they recorded True West's first single.

=== Recording career ===
True West first gained attention for their guitar work in 1982 with a cover of the Syd Barrett/Pink Floyd song "Lucifer Sam," creating a psychedelic effect by placing the same song backwards on the B-side, titled "Mas Reficul." True West soon came to the attention of music writers in the East Coast, U.K., and Europe as part of the West Coast neo-psychedelic movement dubbed the Paisley Underground. However, the twin lead guitar interplay of McGrath and Tolman distinguished them from other Paisley groups.

Their 1983 self-released five song EP, co-produced by Russ Tolman and Steve Wynn, enabled the band to tour the U.S. non-stop, coming to the attention of Television guitarist Tom Verlaine, who took them to upstate New York's Bearsville Studios to record demos for EMI America. More attention from the music press followed with True West being singled out in the March 29, 1984 Rolling Stone magazine feature entitled "Rock & Roll Rookies: Ten Bands You'll Be Hearing From Soon."

September 1984 saw the release of the band's first album Drifters. While not as gritty and psychedelic as the band's debut (which by this time had been re-released as an eight-song mini-LP called Hollywood Holiday), Drifters, with its folk-rock influences, was dubbed "guitar poetry" by Rolling Stone scribe David Fricke.

Other 1980s luminaries started noticing the band, such as Prince, who passed along the word after one Minneapolis show that he was greatly impressed with guitarist McGrath's lyrical leads.

True West landed in London in April 1985 amidst what the U.K. music press had declared "The American Invasion," which had been kicked off a few months earlier by the arrival of R.E.M. Suddenly, England couldn't get enough of American guitar bands and True West made the front pages of the big three music publications of the day: the NME, Melody Maker, and Sounds. Several major labels came courting with talk of production by Steve Lillywhite (U2, XTC), but problems with their work permits did not allow the band to make scheduled appearances on The Old Grey Whistle Test and other British TV that would have pushed them over the top and into the arms of a waiting major, unlike other Paisley Underground bands. After a successful tour of the European continent, the band returned to the U.S. to write and prepare to record their third album.

However, as soon as they were home, R.E.M. invited True West to join them for the 17-date western U.S. and Canada portion of the Athens combo's 1985 Fables of the Reconstruction tour. Playing venues such as Seattle's Paramount Theatre, L.A.'s Greek Theatre and Irvine Meadows put True West in front of the largest audiences of their career.

=== Breakup ===
Two years of constant touring and several disappointing close brushes with a major label recording contract had taken their toll on the band, and True West called it quits in the summer of 1985. Tolman started a successful solo career and the band decided to reform without Tolman shortly after and go on to record and release their third album Hand Of Fate the next year. However, in 1987, bassist Kevin Staydohar (who had also been a member of Central Valley pioneers Thin White Rope) died of a heart valve infection.

In the following years, guitarist Richard McGrath was a member of Wall of Voodoo frontman Stan Ridgway's band and joined singer Gavin Blair to release two albums as The Fool Killers, which released a collection in 1989 called Out Of State Miracle. Russ Tolman recorded eight solo albums, the most recent released in 2019.

=== Reunion ===
True West reformed in 2006, with original members Tolman, McGrath, and Blair, along with new members drummer Jim Huie and bassist Ian Barrett and began to tour for a series of concert dates, continuing several times a year through at least 2009.

On June 5, 2007, Atavistic Worldwide/Touch And Go Records released Hollywood Holiday Revisited, a CD collection of True West's first two albums Hollywood Holiday and Drifters.

A concert DVD called The West Is History (2011), which contains a five-camera shoot of a 2007 live performance from the House Of Blues in Anaheim, CA, plus vintage video from a 1983 San Francisco performance and a 1985 Nuremberg, Germany show, was released on January 24, 2012, by Atavistic Video (distributed by MVD).

In 2009, True West played at a festival in Norway called Down On The Farm, which also featured Stan Ridgway.

The band released the 3CD set Kaleidoscope of Shadows: The Story So Far on their Bring Out Your Dead label in 2021. It contains all three of the band's studio albums, including for the first time on CD Hand of Fate. Also included are six demos from 1985, bonus tracks from the Hand of Fate sessions, along with many live recordings of the band. It was compiled by True West drummer Jim Huie and noted author and reissue producer Pat Thomas (musician).

== Discography ==
=== Albums ===
- Hollywood Holiday (1983, New Rose & 1984, PVC/Passport)
- Drifters (1984, PVC/Passport)
- Hand of Fate (1986, CD Presents)

=== Reissues ===
- Hollywood Holiday Revisited (Atavistic, 2007)
- Kaleidoscope of Shadows: The Story So Far 3CD (2021, Bring Out Your Dead)

=== EPs ===
- True West – 12" 33⅓ (1983, Bring Out Your Dead Records)

=== Singles ===
- "Lucifer Sam"/"Mas Reficul" (1982)

== Videography ==
- The West Is History: Live at The House of Blues (DVD, 2011)
