= Happy Birthday (Altered Images album) =

Studio album by Altered Images
- Released: September 1981
- Studio: Rockfield (Wales); Genetic Sound (Berkshire)
- Genre: New wave; pop; post-punk
- Length: 38:35
- Label: Epic; Portrait
- Producer: Steven Severin; Martin Rushent

Altered Images chronology
Happy Birthday (1981)	Pinky Blue (1982)

Professional ratings
Review scores
Source	Rating
AllMusic	4.5/5 stars
Classic Pop	4/5 stars
Q	3/5 stars
Record Mirror	4/5 stars
Smash Hits	6/10
Uncut	4/5 stars

Happy Birthday is the debut studio album by Scottish new wave band Altered Images, released in 1981. It was chiefly produced by Steven Severin and recorded at Rockfield Studios, with the exception of the title track, which was produced by Martin Rushent and recorded at Genetic Sound. "Happy Birthday" became the band's biggest hit, peaking at number two on the UK Singles Chart in October 1981.

Happy Birthday reached number 26 on the UK Albums Chart and was certified silver by the British Phonographic Industry for sales in excess of 60,000 copies.

== Release ==
Happy Birthday was released on LP and cassette in 1981 by Epic Records in the United Kingdom and Portrait Records in the United States. The US edition of the album features a re-recording, produced by Martin Rushent, of the track "Insects", in place of the original Steven Severin-produced version included on the UK edition.

Happy Birthday was reissued on CD several times in the 1990s. In 2004, Edsel Records issued an expanded edition of Happy Birthday, entitled Happy Birthday... Plus, on CD, which contained the original album along with six bonus tracks, including the band's first single "Dead Pop Stars" (which had peaked at number 67 in the UK earlier in 1981, but was not included on the original album). The album was reissued again in December 2016 as a 180-gram black vinyl LP, with a bonus 7" on red vinyl. It was then reissued in April 2017 as a double LP set for Record Store Day on 180-gram black vinyl, containing additional period material not included on the previous bonus 7".

== Track listing ==
All tracks are written by Altered Images, except where noted.

Side one

1. "Intro: Happy Birthday" – 0:44
2. "Love and Kisses" – 2:18
3. "Real Toys" – 3:23
4. "Idols" – 2:27
5. "Legionaire" – 3:30
6. "Faithless" – 3:49
7. "Beckoning Strings" – 3:05

Side two

1. "Happy Birthday" – 3:00
2. "Midnight" – 3:39
3. "A Days Wait" – 4:20
4. "Leave Me Alone" – 4:08
5. "Insects" – 3:28
6. "Outro: Happy Birthday" – 0:44

Happy Birthday... Plus bonus tracks

14. "Dead Pop Stars" – 3:17
15. "Sentimental" – 3:24
16. "Who Cares?" – 3:00
17. "Happy Birthday" (dance mix) – 7:03
18. "So We Go Whispering" – 3:47
19. "Jeepster" (Marc Bolan) – 2:29

2016 reissue bonus 7"

1. "Dead Pop Stars"
2. "Sentimental"

2017 Record Store Day reissue bonus LP

Side one

1. "Happy Birthday" (dance mix)
2. "Jeepster" (Bolan)

Side two

1. "Leave Me Alone" (original cassette single version)
2. "Who Cares"
3. "So We Go Whispering"
4. "Real Toys" (flexi version)
5. "Happy New Year"

== Personnel ==
Credits are adapted from the album's liner notes.

Altered Images

- Clare Grogan – vocals
- Michael "Tich" Anderson – drums
- Tony McDaid – guitar
- Johnny McElhone – bass
- Jim McKinven – guitar

Additional musicians

- Gerard "Caesar" McNulty – guitar on "A Days Wait"

Production

- Steven Severin – production
- Ted Sharp – engineering
- Martin Rushent – production and engineering on "Happy Birthday" (and "Insects" on US edition)

Design

- David Band – art direction
- Simon Fowler – inner sleeve photography
- Terry Lott – inner sleeve photography
- Chris Webster – cover photography

The liner notes contain the following dedication: "Thanks to Janet and the Ice Bergs, John Peel and Ginge with special thanks to Ceaser, Bobby, Kathleen and a very special hug for cheesy agency Ian Wilson at Wasted Talent".
