= Don't Talk to Me About Love (song) =

Single by Altered Images

from the album Bite
- B-side: "Last Goodbye"
- Released: 1983
- Genre: New wave
- Length: 3:46 (single); 4:50 (album)
- Label: Epic (UK); Portrait (US and Canada)
- Songwriter: Altered Images
- Producer: Mike Chapman

Altered Images singles chronology
"Song Sung Blue" (1982)	"Don't Talk to Me About Love" (1983)	"Bring Me Closer" (1983)

Music video
- "Don't Talk to Me About Love" on YouTube

"Don't Talk to Me About Love" is a song by the Scottish new wave and post-punk band Altered Images, released as the first single from their third studio album, Bite (1983). The single reached the top 10 in three countries; peaking at No. 7 in the UK, and No. 6 in both Ireland and New Zealand. The song was their last major hit, as the next three singles only had moderate to minor chart placings ("Bring Me Closer" was their last single to make the top 40 in the UK and Ireland, peaking at Nos. 29 and 17, respectively).

== Critical reception ==
In Melody Maker, Edwyn Collins of the Scottish jangle pop band Orange Juice wrote, "I don't know whether it's out of insecurity, but she just strings together a lot of lyrical cliches that I think are completely impotent and meaningless. Musically, I don't see it as much of a progression."

== Charts ==
=== Weekly charts ===
Chart (1983)	Peak position
Australia (Kent Music Report)	58
Ireland (IRMA)	6
New Zealand (Recorded Music NZ)	6
UK Singles (Official Charts)	7

=== Year-end charts ===
Chart (1983)	Position
New Zealand (Recorded Music NZ)	36
